= Mene novaehispaniae =

Mene novaehispaniae Temporal range: Oligocene
- The only known illustration of the M. novaehispaniae type specimen

Scientific classification
- Kingdom: Animalia
- Phylum: Chordata
- Class: Actinopterygii
- Division: Teleostei
- Order: Carangiformes
- Family: Menidae
- Genus: Mene
- Species: †M. novaehispaniae

Binomial name
- †Mene novaehispaniae Eastman, 1914

Extinct species of marine ray-finned fish

Mene novaehispaniae is an extinct species of marine ray-finned fish, related to the modern moonfish, belonging to the family Menidae. It inhabited the western Atlantic Ocean during the Oligocene.

It is known from a single complete specimen, now lost, found on the Caribbean island of Antigua in 1755. This specimen is possibly the earliest known articulated fossil fish identified from the Americas. This specimen was illustrated during in a 1755 letter from Reverend Francis Byam of Antigua (grandson of colonialist William Byam and son of former governor Edward Byam) read before the Royal Society. The specimen was referred by Byam as a "(fish) which we call an old-wife", and was found preserved in chalky matrix at an indeterminate locality. After over a century and a half, the species was officially described by Charles Rochester Eastman in 1914 on the basis of the illustration, as the original specimen could not be relocated. The morphology of M. novaehispaniae was found to be intermediate between the two Mene species known from the Eocene of Italy (M. oblonga and M. rhombea), with this distinctiveness providing the basis for its description as a new species despite the lack of a specimen.

Alongside the extinct surgeonfish Eonaso, which likely originates from the same locality, Mene novaehispaniae is one of the few fossil fish known from Antigua. Its presence in the Caribbean provides evidence that the genus Mene, currently only found in the Indo-Pacific, formerly inhabited the western Atlantic Ocean.
