= Bolca =

Village in Vestenanova, Verona, Italy

Coordinates: 45°35′43″N 11°12′36″E

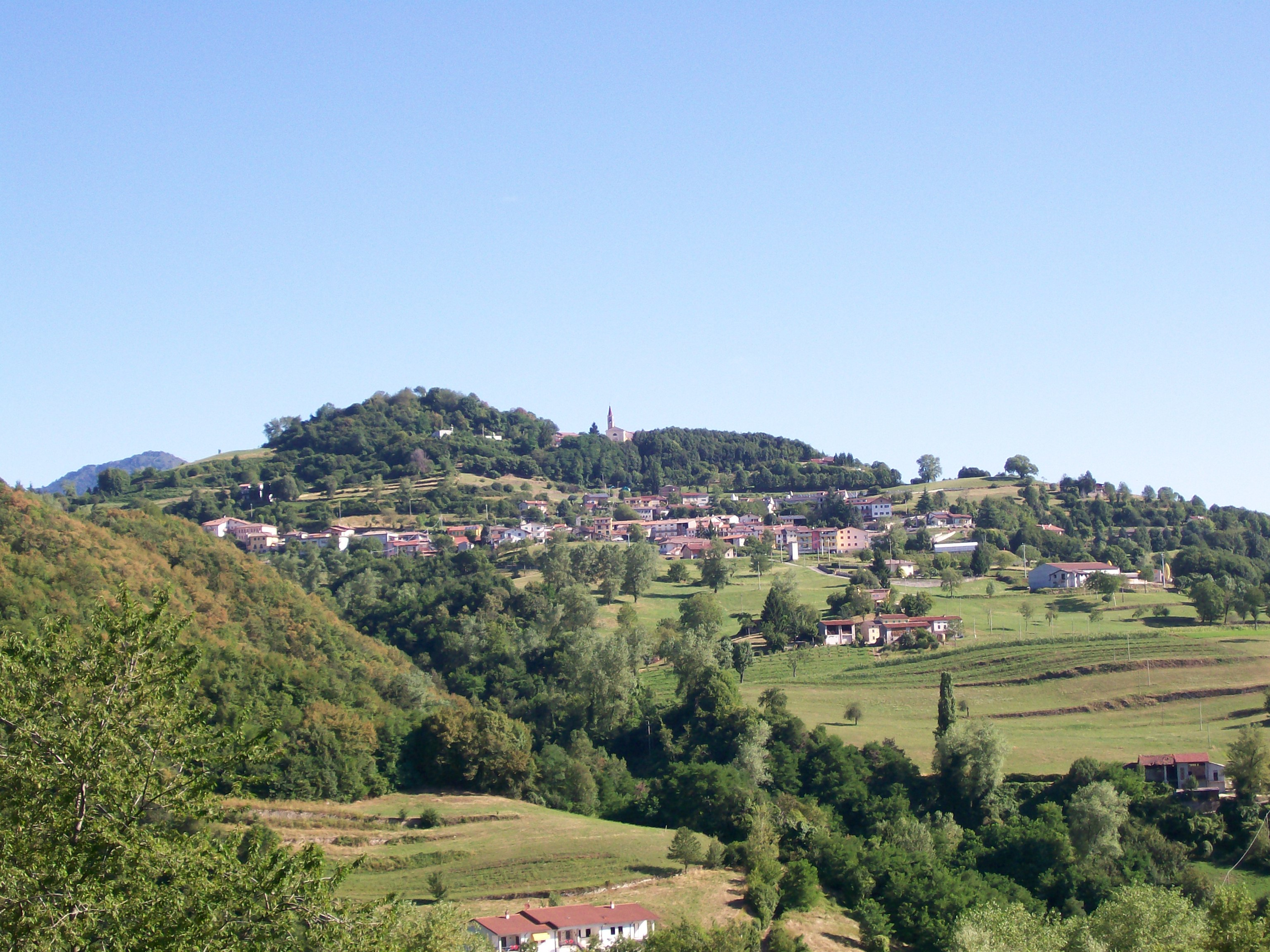
Panorama of Bolca

Bolca is a village in the Veneto, on the southern margin of the Italian Alps. It is a frazione of the comune of Vestenanova, in the province of Verona. The area is famous for the marine fossils from the lagerstätte of Monte Bolca. It was one of the first fossil sites with high quality preservation known to Europeans, and is still an important source of fossils from the Eocene.

== Geography ==
Bolca lies in the Lessini Alps. Monte Bolca was originally at the bottom of the Tethys Ocean before being uplifted from the ocean floor during the formation of the Alps. This happened in two stages, one 24 million years ago and one between 30 and 50 million years ago.

== History ==
The area was settled in prehistoric times, there are remains of a hill fort on Monte Purga dating from around 1000 BC. The Romans were active in the area, and by 1000 CE the village had come under the control of a convent of the Augustinian Eremitani. In the thirteenth century the fortunes of the Vestenanova area were closely tied to the Ghibelline Ezzelino III da Romano family, the Lords of Verona, whose estates were razed in 1260. The Mezzagonella's castle of "Bubulka cum Vulpiana" was seized by Mastino I della Scala, Ezzelino da Romano's successor, from Ludovico count of San Bonifacio during the 1269-70 war between the Guelphs and Ghibellines. From then on the village was part of Verona, but gained its independence in 1326 by edict of Cangrande I della Scala. In 1387 the area passed to the Duchy of Milan; under Gian Maria Visconti it fell to Venetian rule from 1410 until the fall of the Venetian Republic in 1797. After the defeat of Napoleon, the Kingdom of Lombardy–Venetia became part of the Austrian Empire, during which time Francis I of Austria spent three days in Bolca. In 1821 Bolca was split from Volpiano, the former being joined to Vestenanova, whilst Volpiano became a frazione of Crespadoro, a town now in the province of Vicenza.

The fossils at Monte Bolca have been known since at least the 16th century, and were studied intensively in the 19th century once it was definitively proven that fossils were the remnants of dead animals.

== Fossils ==
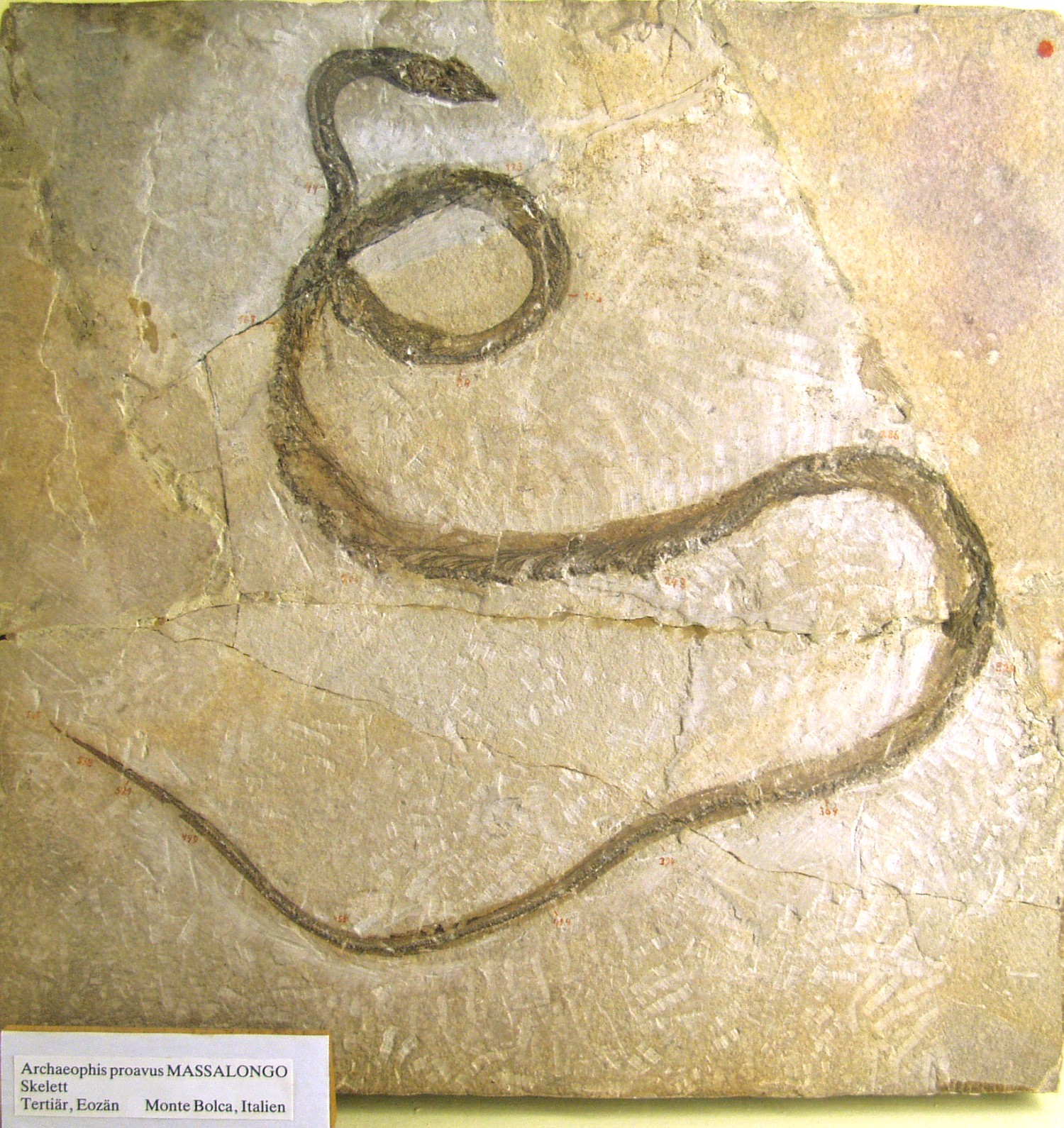
Archaeophis proavus Massalongo. (Museum für Naturkunde Berlin)

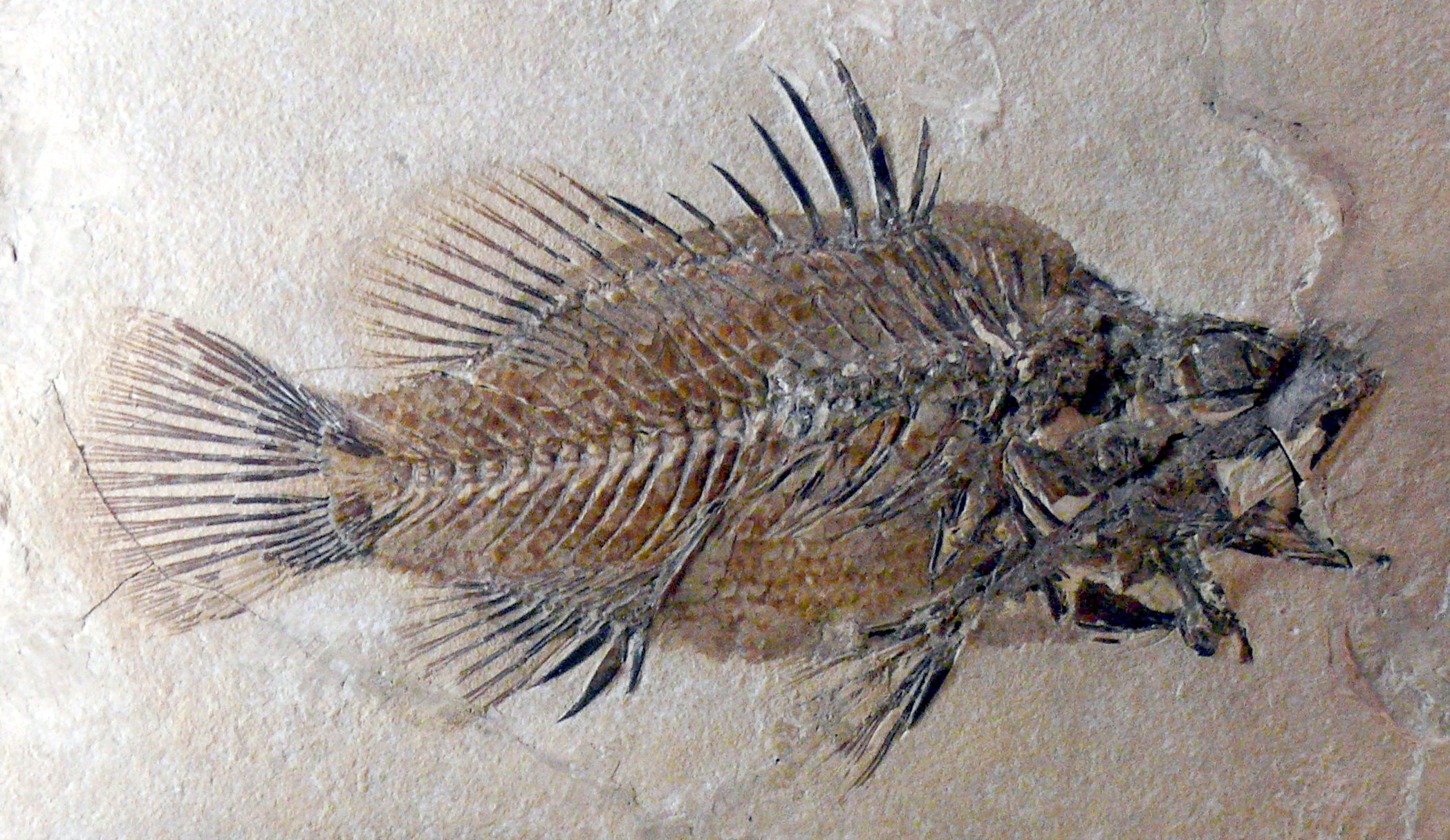
Eolates gracilis, a fossil perch. (Museum für Naturkunde Berlin)

Strictly speaking, the Monte Bolca site is one specific spot near the village of Bolca in Italy, known as the Pesciara ("The Fishbowl") due to its many extraordinarily well preserved Eocene fish fossils. However, there are several other related outcroppings in the general vicinity that also carry fossils, such as Monte Postale and Monte Vegroni. The term Monte Bolca is used interchangeably to refer to the original site, or to all the sites collectively.

The entire formation consists of 19 metres (62 ft) of lithographic limestone, all of which contain fossils, but interspersed in which are the lagerstätte layers that contain the highly preserved specimens. Within these layers, the fish and other specimens are so highly preserved that their organs are often completely preserved in fossil form, and even the skin color can sometimes be determined. The normal rearrangement of the specimens caused by mud-dwelling organisms in the layer before it turned to stone has been avoided—it is assumed that the mud in question was low in oxygen, preventing both decay and the action of scavengers.

Fossils from Monte Bolca are commonly available for sale by commercial fossil dealers, and due to their popularity and preservation regularly sell for several hundred euros. Fossil species include the moonfish Mene rhombea and Mene oblonga, the batfish Eoplatax papilio, the spadefish Exellia velifer, the "angelfish" carangid, Ceratoichthys, a crocodile, Crocodilus vicetinus, and a snake, Archaeophis bolcaensis.

== Economy ==
The area is dependent on tourism and agriculture; the famous wine regions of Valpolicella and Soave lie just to the south. In the village there is a museum with three rooms of fossils from the area.

== See also ==
- Fossil site of Monte Bolca
