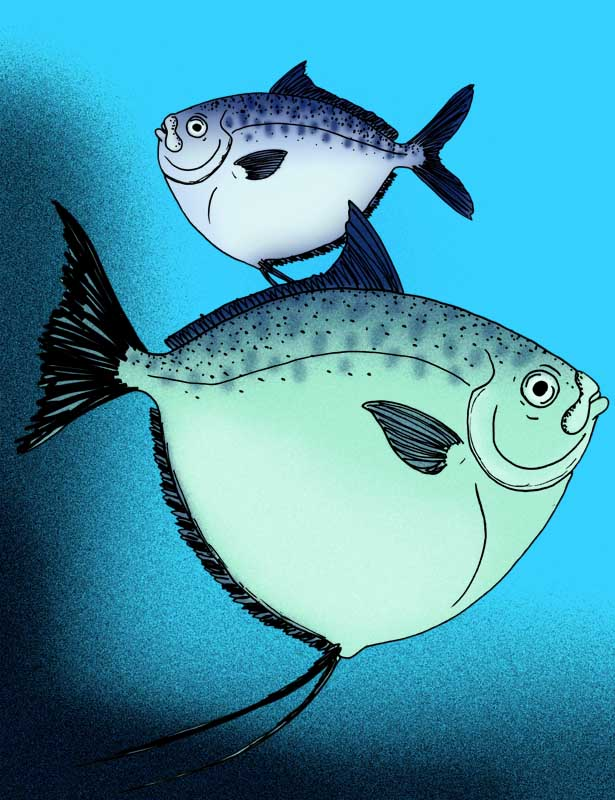
- M. maculata (top) and M. purdyi

Scientific classification
- Kingdom: Animalia
- Phylum: Chordata
- Class: Actinopterygii
- Order: Carangiformes
- Family: Menidae
- Genus: Mene
- Species: †M. purdyi

Binomial name
- †Mene purdyi Friedman & Johnson, 2005

= Mene purdyi =

Mene purdyi Temporal range: Late Thanetian ~58.7–55.8 Ma

Extinct species of fish

Mene purdyi an extinct species of ray-finned fish in the genus Mene, from Late Thanetian-aged marine deposits in northern Peru. M. purdyi is currently known only from a single skull and a few post-cranial bones. M. purdyi is among the largest, if not the largest, members of the genus, as the skull suggests that it would have been over 40 centimetres (16 in) in life. The living species, M. maculata, by comparison, grows to an average length of 18 centimetres (7.1 in).
