= Monte Bolca =

Frazione of Italy

- Stratigraphic range: Late Ypresian, 50–49 Ma
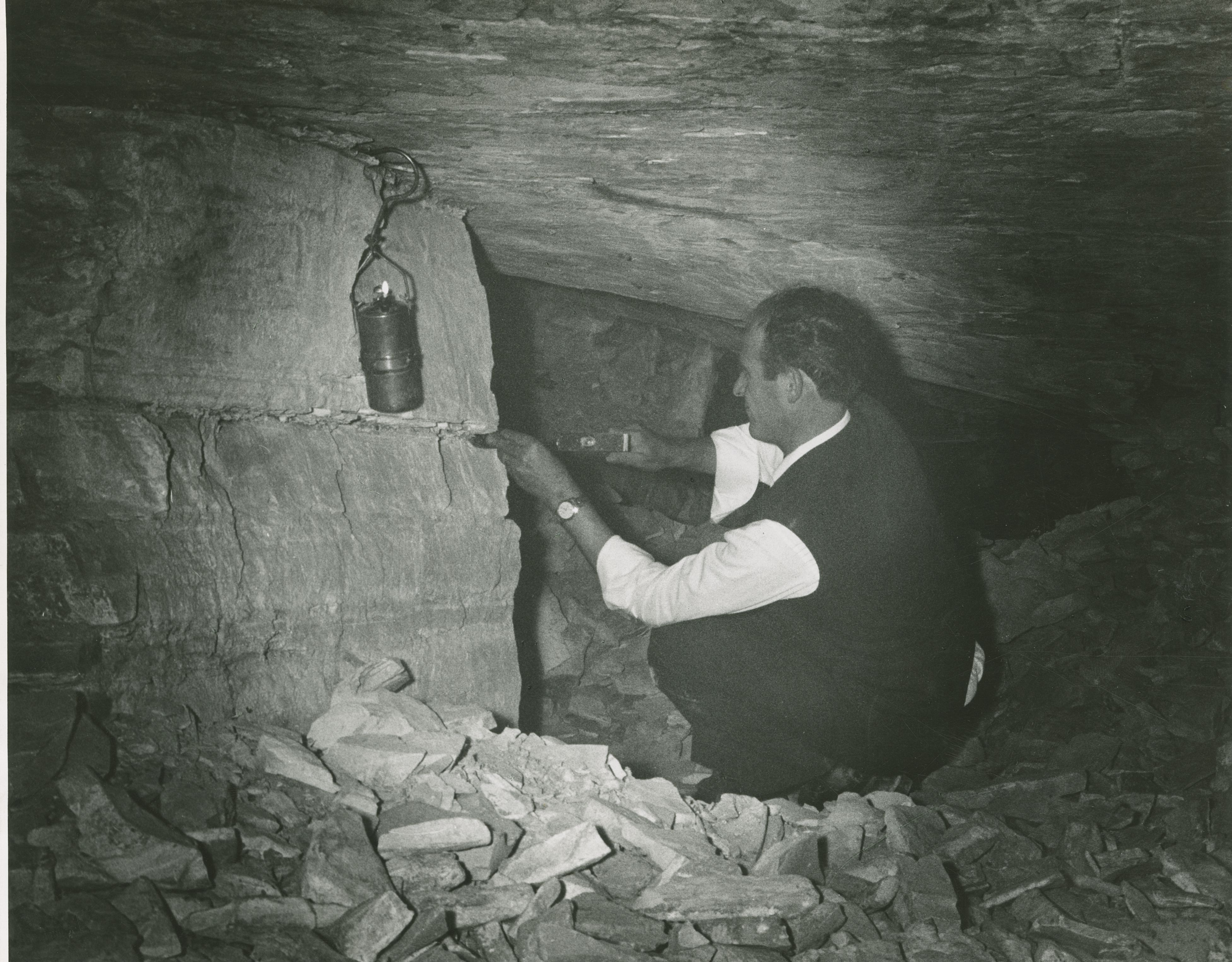
- Fossils being excavated from the Pesciara site, ca. 1964
- Type: Lagerstätte
- Sub-units: Pesciacara, Monte Postale, Purga di Bolca, Vegroni

Lithology
- Primary: Limestone, marl, lignite
- Other: Volcaniclastic

Location
- Coordinates: 45.6°N 11.2°E
- Approximate paleocoordinates: 37.3°N 10.3°E
- Region: Veneto
- Country: Italy

Type section
- Named for: Bolca, Italy
- Named by: Giovanni Serafino Volta
- Year defined: 1789
- Monte Bolca (Italy)

Monte Bolca is an Early Eocene-aged geologic site located near Verona, Italy. A Konservat-Lagerstätte, it contains an extremely well-preserved and diverse marine biota, including the most diverse fish fauna of any Cenozoic fossil site, as well as many of the earliest fossil occurrences of modern marine fish groups. It was one of the first fossil sites with high quality preservation known to Europeans, with studies of its biota dating back to the 18th century and earlier, and is still an important source of fossils.

== History ==
Strictly speaking, the Monte Bolca site is one specific spot near the village of Bolca in Italy, known as the Pesciara ("The Fishbowl") due to its many extraordinarily well preserved Eocene fish fossils. However, there are several other related outcroppings in the general vicinity that also carry similar fossils, such as Monte Postale and Monte Vegroni. The term Monte Bolca is used interchangeably to refer to the one, original site, or to all the sites collectively.

The fossils at Monte Bolca have been known since at least the 16th century, though the first extensive research was conducted on them by Giovanni Serafino Volta in the late 18th century. They were studied intensively in the 19th century once it was definitively proven that fossils were the remnants of dead animals.

Fossils from Monte Bolca are commonly available for sale by commercial fossil dealers, and due to their popularity and preservation regularly sell for several hundred dollars.

== Geology ==
A map of Italian Lagerstätten from the Eocene, The Monte Bolca sites are in the bottom right.

All sites referred to as being a part of Monte Bolca are located in the eastern part of Monti Lessini near Verona, northern Italy. This area represents a continuation of the Southern Alps. Though all of these sites have been put under a single name, there is not a place called "Monte Bolca". Due to the differences in the environment and stratigraphy, more recent authors have also called these sites the Bolca Lagerstätten.

Due to volcanic events that had taken place in the area, a number of tectonic disturbances are present which were a result of the uplift of the ‘‘Trento Plateau’’. The nonuniform uplift of this plateau also caused the creation of the Lessini Shelf which was the northernmost margin of the Adriatic Plate. Multiple authors have mentioned a sub-vertical fault that runs north northwest-south southeast just west of Bolca. However, more recent work done at Monte Postale has not seen the presence of this supposed fault and has since been discarded.

=== Spilecco ===
Spilecco, also known as Spilecco Hill, is largely made up of poorly-exposed reddish marly and grey-green limestones. While the fossil content of the grey-green limestones is made up of various microfossils, macrofossils are found in the reddish marly limestones. The strata within Spilecco date from the Thanetian to lower Ypresian which make them the oldest shallow water deposits in the Lessini Shelf and would have been deposited after the first period of volcanic activity.

=== Pesciara ===
The Pesciara site of Monte Bolca is made up of a sheet-like limestone in the form of an olistolith which has an area of a few hundred square meters and is under 20 m thick. Throughout this bed, there are both reef and alveoline limestones which are medium-fine grained. The different limestone beds alternate between the fossiliferous laminites and more course-grained biocalcarenites and biocalcirudites. These more course layers are a lot less fossiliferous though still contain fossils such as foraminifera and mollusks. Most fossils within the Persciara site have been found within five of the levels with the 1st, 2nd, and 5th levels being the most productive. However, due to being completely excavated over the last four centuries, the 5th level is no longer accessible. Towards the south-east of the deposit, the limestone layers dip at a 24° angle which suggests that the beds slid towards the north-west when they were more plastic. Volcanoclastic rock surrounds the limestone beds and due to this isolation, there has been trouble in understanding the relationship between the Pesciara and Monte Postale sites. Due to the foraminifera and other fossils found at the site, Pesciara has been assigned to the late Ypresian.

=== Monte Postale ===
The Monte Postale site of Monte Bolca is located north of Pesciara and represents a succession with a thickness of over 130 m. Throughout this complex succession, there are transitions from fine-grained limestones to massive coralgal limestones. These coralgal limestones are highly abundant in coral colonies and range from weakly to massive stratification. The thicker logs of the coralgal limestones are about 13.7 m in thickness each with the finer-grained logs being thinner. Within all of these logs, there is Alveolina present however it is much more common in the coarser-grained sediments. Though the site is largely known for the fish and plants found, Monte Postale is also well known for the molluscan fauna located at the uppermost section of the site. Just like Pesciara, the stata of Monte Postale have been dated to the late Ypresian with the upper-most portion of the beds being potentially correlated to the limestones seen at Pesciara.

=== Purga di Bolca and Vegroni ===
Unlike Pesciara and Monte Postale, Purga di Bolca and Vegroni are representative of freshwater to brackish environments. Both localities are within a volcanic cone whose base has been dated to the Ypresian, similar to the other sites of Monte Bolca. Purga di Bolca is made up of silts, clays, and lignites with contain the vertebrates and mollusks of these localities. This locality is preserved as a conical hill and ranges between 10-20 m in thickness. Under these strata there are tuffaceous layers containing palms. The succession between the two is interrupted by layers of basalt. Though the base of the cone date to a similar age to the other sites, this more terrestrial environment is younger than the above mentioned marine strata. The palm beds found in the Vegroni locality have been dated to the early Oligocene while the basaltic layer have been dated to the Bartonian. The correlation between these more terrestrial and marine faunas have long been problematic.

== Species in the formation ==
=== Animal fossils ===
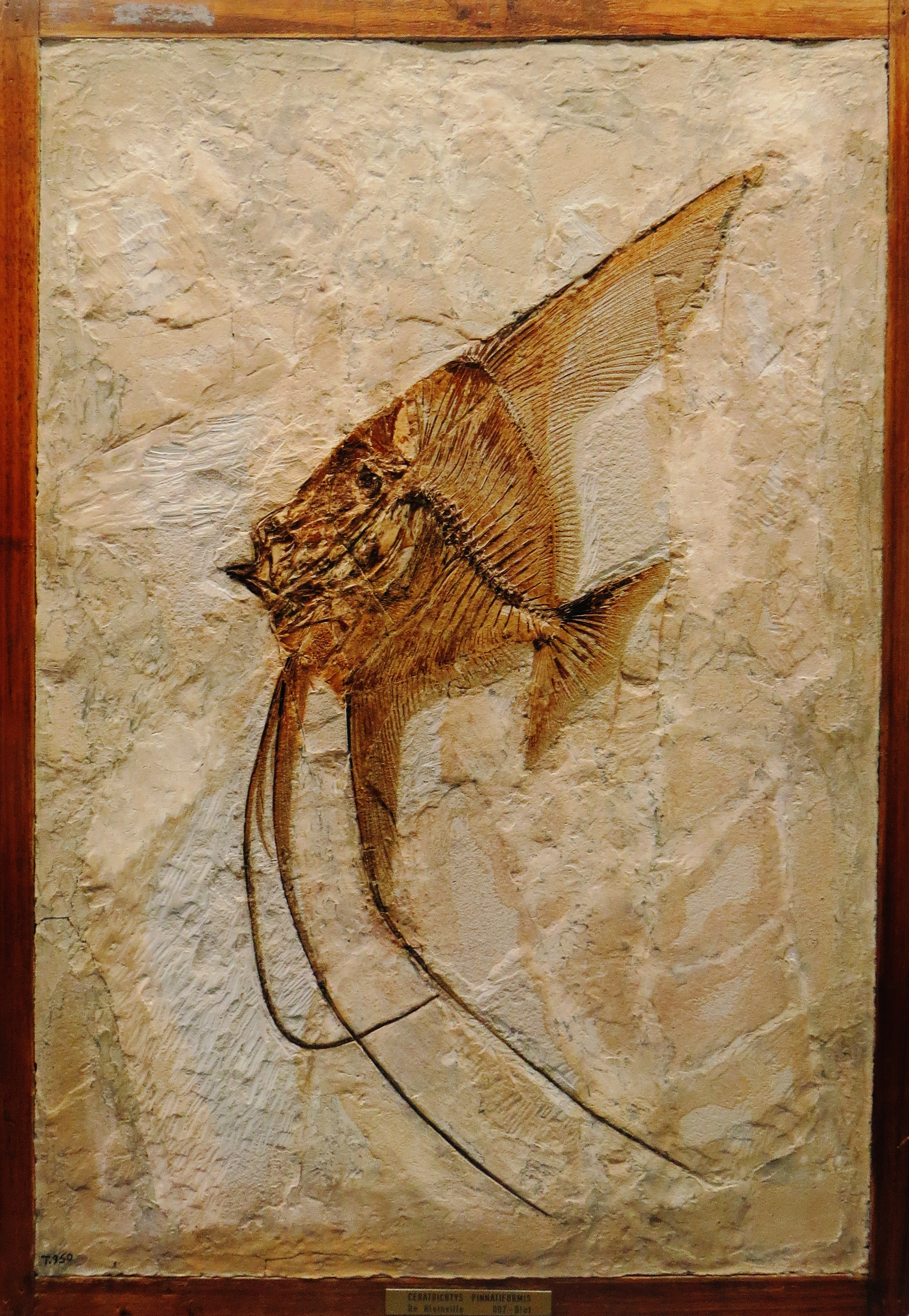
The bizarre jackfish Ceratoichthys

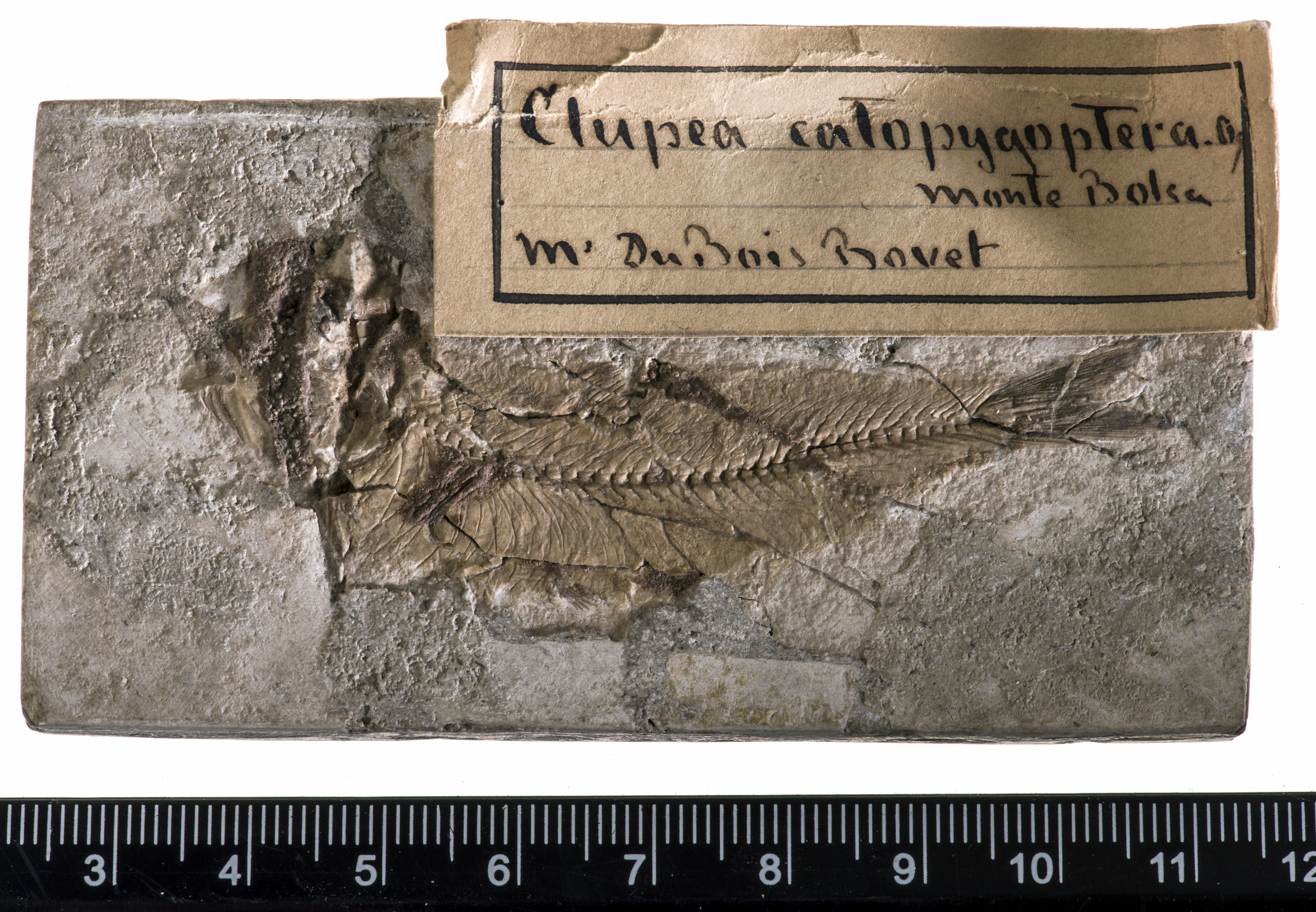
The small herring relative Bolcaichthys is the most common fish of the formation

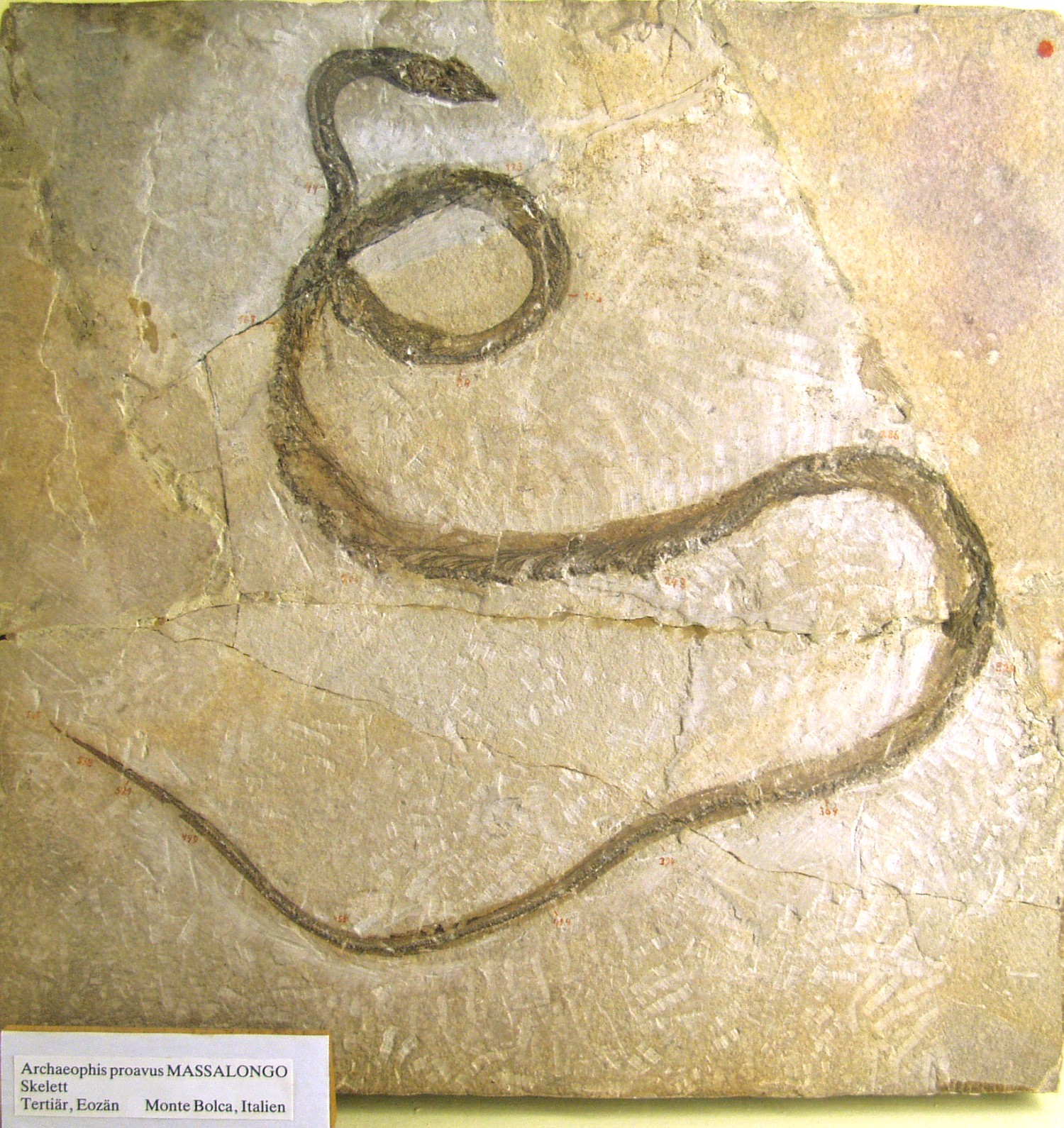
The marine snake Archaeophis proavus Massalongo, Museum für Naturkunde (Berlin).

Monte Bolca is rich in fish: 250 species (140 genera, 90 families and 19 orders). Additionally a cephalopod, crustaceans, jellyfish and polychaete worms have been found whole, but foraminifera, molluscs, and corals are found in fragments and may have been transported. Bird feathers and tortoise shell plates have been found, as well as many insects, freshwater and land plants.

Notable fossil species include:

- Fish
  - Angiolinia mirabilis, an zanclid fish
  - Bolcaperca craccorum, an perch
  - Blochius longirostris, an ancestral swordfish
  - Ceratoichthys, an unusual jack fish
  - Bolcaichthys, a herring relative and the most abundant fish of the formation
  - Cyclopoma gigas, a large percomorph
  - Eastmanalepes primaevus, a jack fish
  - Eolactoria sorbinii, a boxfish
  - Eoplatax papilio, a batfish
  - Exellia velifer, a spadefish
  - Godsilia lanceolata, a primitive tuna
  - Eolates, a relative of the Nile perch
  - Caruso brachysomus, a primitive anglerfish
  - Mene rhombea and Mene oblonga, early moonfish
  - Paranguilla tigrina, an eel with preserved coloration
  - Pasaichthys pleuronectiformis, a mooneyfish
  - Platax altissimus and Platax macropterygius, spadefish
  - Platinx, one of the last crossognathiform fish
  - Proaracana dubia, an aracanid boxfish
  - Protobalistum imperial, a relative of boxfish and triggerfish
  - Psettopsis subarcuatus, a mooneyfish
  - Pycnodus platessus, one of the last pycnodont fish
  - Pygaeus nobilis, a bony-fish
  - Serranus occipitalis, a sea bass
  - Sharfia mirabilis, an anglerfish
  - Sphyraena bolcensis, one of the earliest barracudas
  - Spinacanthus cuneiformis, a relative of boxfish and triggerfish
  - Zorzinichthys, a zorzinichthyid percomorph
- Sharks
  - Galeorhinus cuvieri, a relative of the modern school shark
  - Eogaleus, an early requiem shark
  - Brachycarcharias, a sand shark
- Rays
  - Arechia crassicaudata, an stingaree
  - Dasyomyliobatis, a stingray intermediate between whiptail stingrays and eagle rays
  - Lessiniabatis, a bizarre stingray with a highly reduced tail
- Lobster
  - Justitia desmaresti
- Crocodile
  - Crocodilus vicetinus
- Snakes
  - Archaeophis bolcaensis
  - Archaeophis proavus
- Cephalopods
  - Bolcaoctopus pesciaraensis, an octopus

=== Plant fossils ===
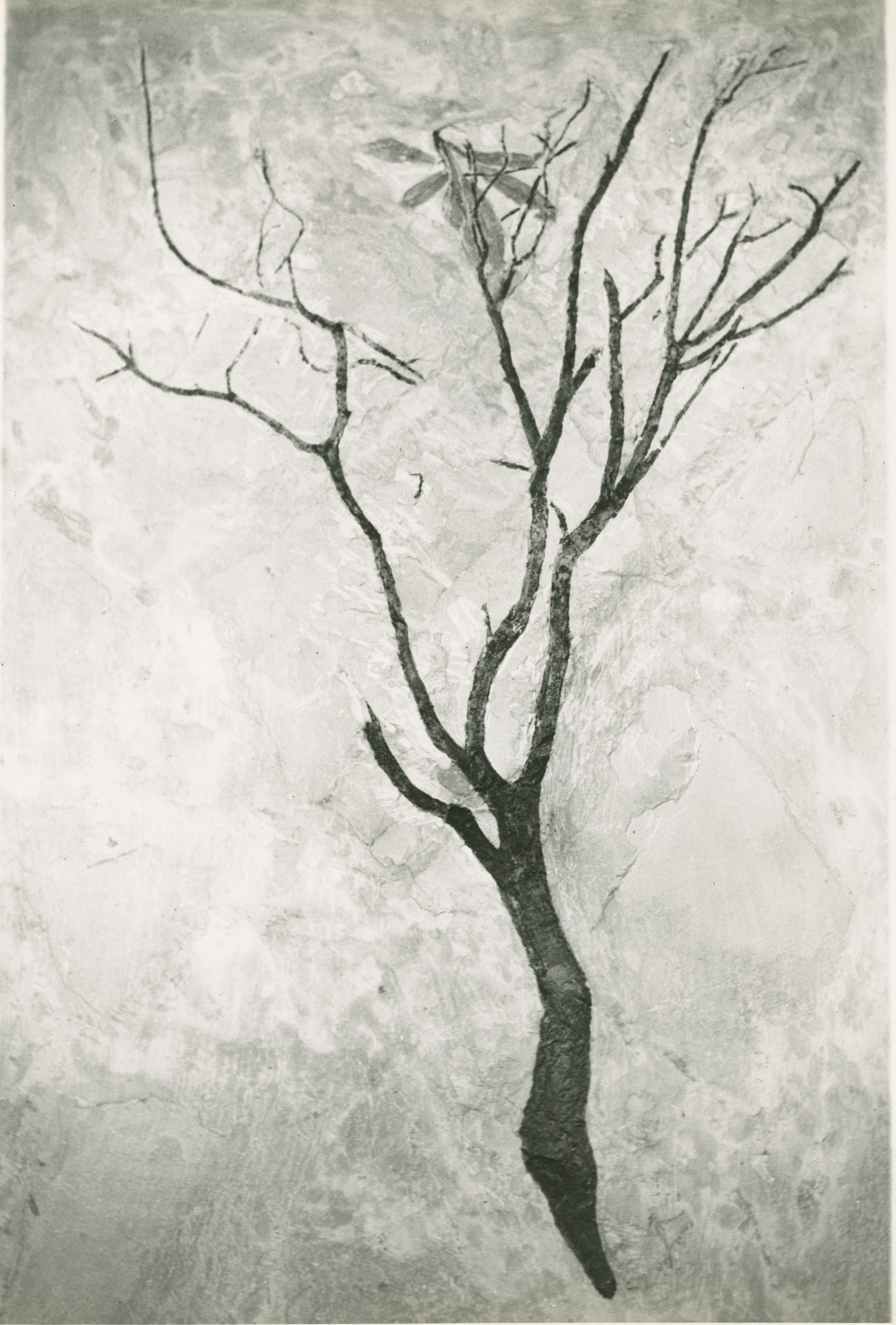
A well-preserved tree branch recovered from Bolca

One of the more interesting puzzles in ichnotaxonomy, pertains to fossils from Monte Bolca, originally named Zoophycos caput-medusae, previously thought to be trace fossils, were found to be plants instead and given the name Algarum by French zoologist Henri Milne-Edwards in 1866. The type specimen collected by Italian paleobotanist Abramo Bartolommeo Massalongo before 1855 is at the Natural History Museum of Verona and was preserved in a lithographic limestone upper and lower slab.

When Italian botanist Achille Forti (28 November 1878 Verona -11 February 1937 Verona) worked on the specimens in 1926, they were reinterpreted as close relatives of the sea palm, now known to be a brown algae, which had lived in the coastal waters of the Eocene sea. He renamed the species Postelsia caput-medusae which makes it related to the genus Postelsia, now with only one living species, which was described by its discoverer Franz Josef Ruprecht in 1852 as Postelsia palmaeformis. His type-specimen is from Bodega Bay, California, but the species is found along the Pacific coast. The appearance of the plant is a holdfast on the bottom, with a stem-like stipe between there and the fronds which are about 5 centimetres (2.0 in) to 10 centimetres (3.9 in). In life, the fronds hang vertically when the tide is in but flop over the stipe when exposed by low tide.

Curiously, other specimens from this deposit collected and described by Massalongo in 1855 were actually trace fossils, only this one was a plant.

== See also ==
- List of fossil sites (with link directory)
