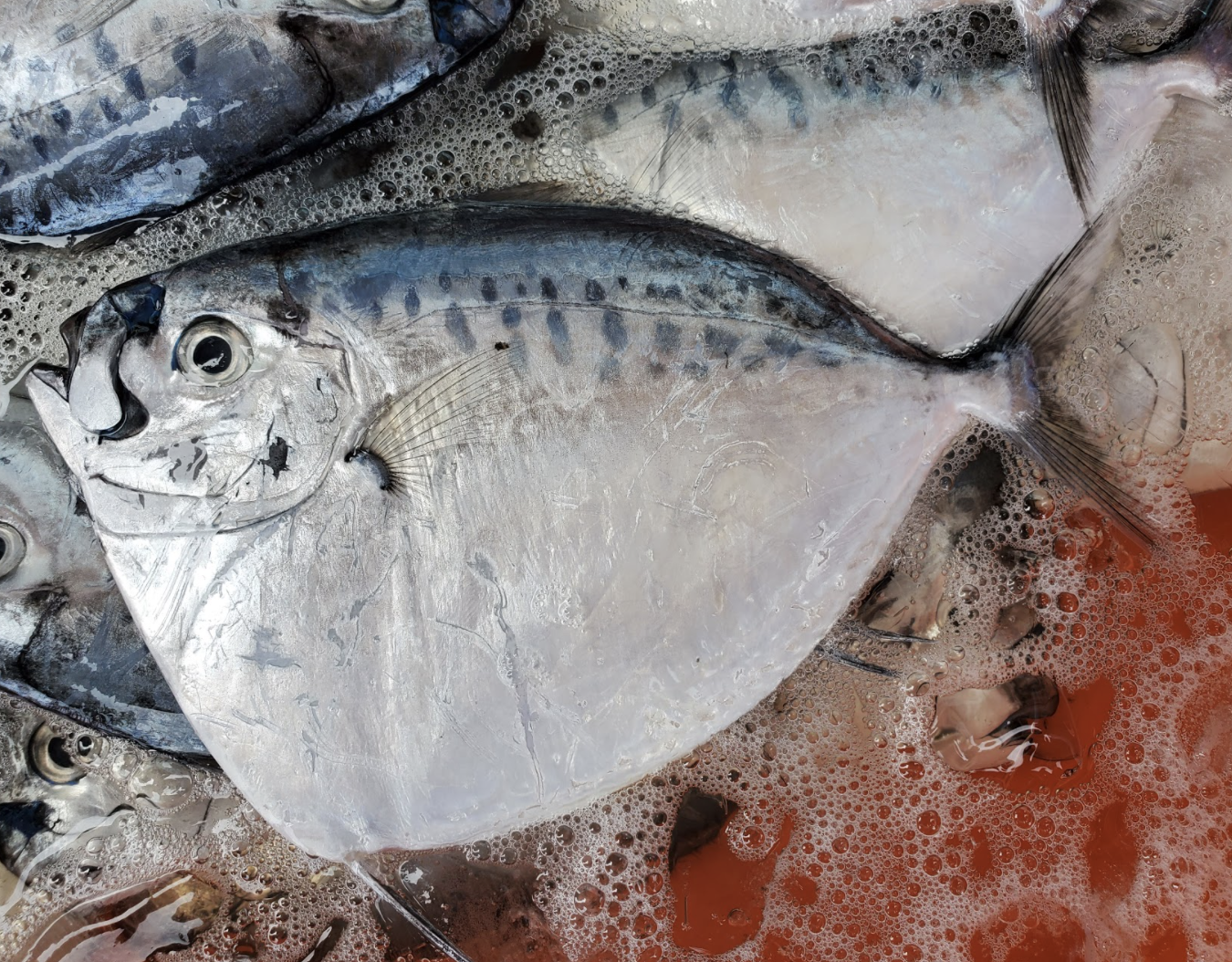
- Mene maculata

Scientific classification
- Kingdom: Animalia
- Phylum: Chordata
- Class: Actinopterygii
- Division: Teleostei
- Order: Carangiformes
- Suborder: Menoidei
- Family: Menidae; Fitzinger, 1873
- Genus: Mene; Lacépède, 1803

Type species
- Zeus maculatus Bloch & J. G. Schneider, 1801

Species
- Mene maculata; †Mene rhombea; †Mene purdyi; †Mene oblonga; †Mene phosphatica; †Mene triangulum; †Mene novaehispaniae; †?Mene kapurdiensis

Synonyms
- Meneus Rafinesque, 1815; Gasteronemus Agassiz, 1833

= Mene =

Mene Temporal range: 62.2–0 Ma Danian to Present

Genus of ray-finned fishes

The moonfish of the genus Mene, the sole extant genus of the family Menidae, are disk-shaped fish which bear a vague resemblance to gourami, thanks to their lateral compression and thread-like pelvic fins. Today, the genus is represented only by Mene maculata of the Indo-Pacific, where it is a popular food fish, especially in the Philippines, where it is known as bilong-bilong, chabita, hiwas or tahas.

== Taxonomy ==
Anatomical and recent molecular studies strongly suggest a relationship with the pomfrets, dolphinfishes, remoras and the jacks in the order Carangiformes. More recent studies specifically suggest that the Menidae are the sister group to the billfish, despite the vast morphological disparity between the two groups.

=== Fossil record ===
As a genus, Mene has a long fossil history, with species found in marine sediments throughout the Cenozoic Era. The earliest known fossils of Mene are articulated skeletons belonging to an undescribed species from the early Paleocene (Danian)-aged Dakhla Formation of Egypt, just 3 million years after the Cretaceous-Paleogene extinction event. The earliest described species, M. purdyi from the Late Paleocene of Peru, resemble later species, such as M. rhombea of the Monte Bolca lagerstätte, and even the living species, M. maculata. Experts remain undecided whether the Tunisian species, M. phosphatica is from the Lower Paleocene, thus making it older than M. purdyi, or whether it is from the Ypresian epoch of the Eocene.

Articulated Mene fossil skeletons become more prominent from the Eocene onwards, with the well-known species M. rhombea & M. oblonga from the Early Eocene and Oligocene of Italy, M. kapurdiensis from the early Eocene of India (originally referred to its own genus, Leiomene), M. triangulum from the earliest Eocene of Turkmenistan, and an undescribed species from the early Eocene-aged Fur Formation of Denmark. From the Oligocene, M. novaehispaniae is known from a now-lost skeleton from Antigua; this specimen was one of the earliest fossil fish discovered in the Americas. Alongside indeterminate fragmentary remains from the Early Eocene-aged Nanjemoy Formation of Virginia, US, M. novaehispaniae provides evidence that Mene species formerly inhabited the western Atlantic Ocean, a region where they are no longer found in modern times.

Almost all of the fossil Mene species are known primarily from the Paleogene; the Neogene record is limited to some indeterminate otoliths found in Early Miocene strata from the Canture Formation of Venezuela, which also represent the last records of this genus in the Atlantic Ocean. No whole or even partial specimens known from Pliocene or Pleistocene strata.

The first species of the genus to be described was not the extant M. maculata, but rather the extinct fossil species Mene rhombea; however, M. rhombea was not initially classified in Mene, with the genus name being coined for the extant species.

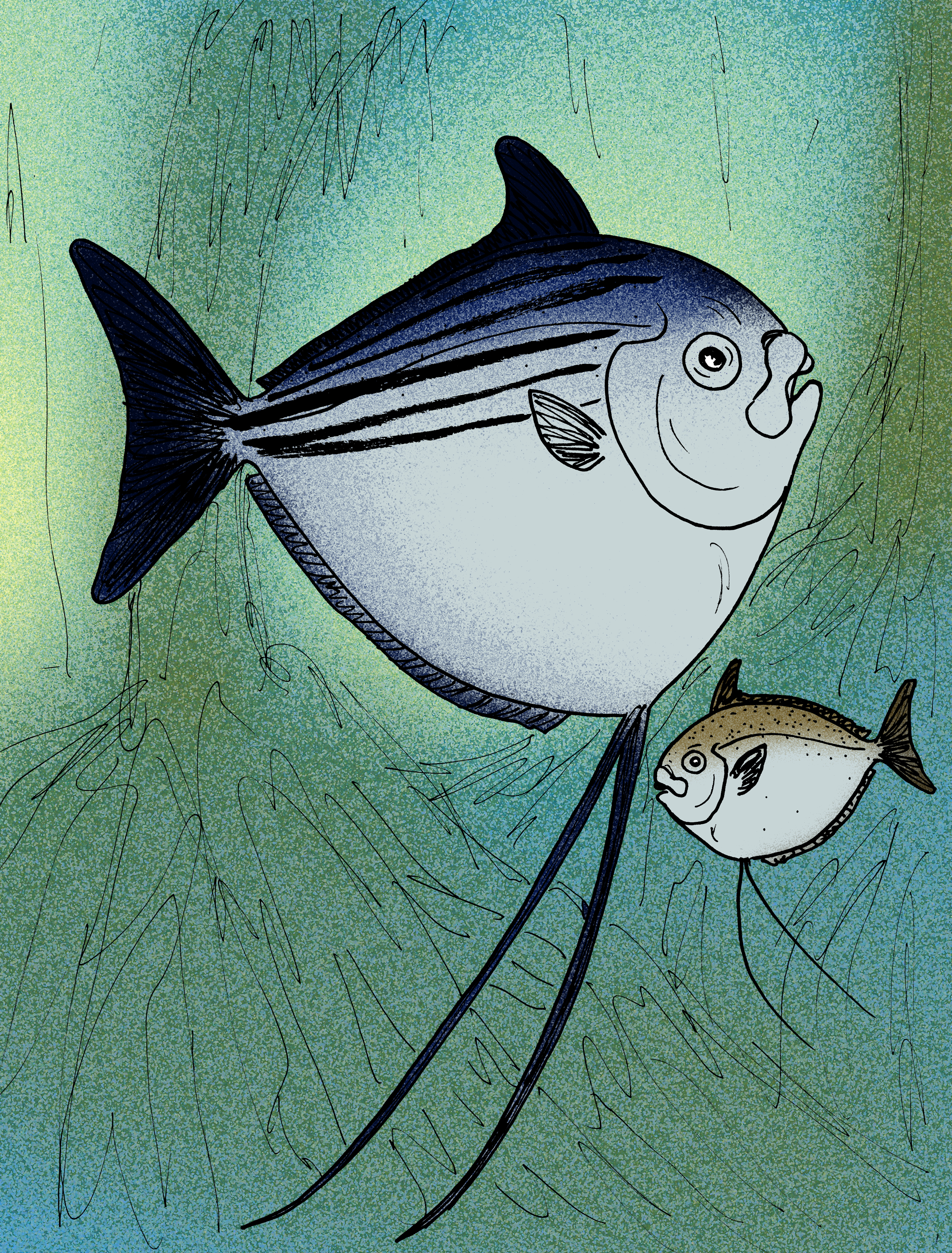
Restoration comparing †Mene rhombea and †Mene oblonga

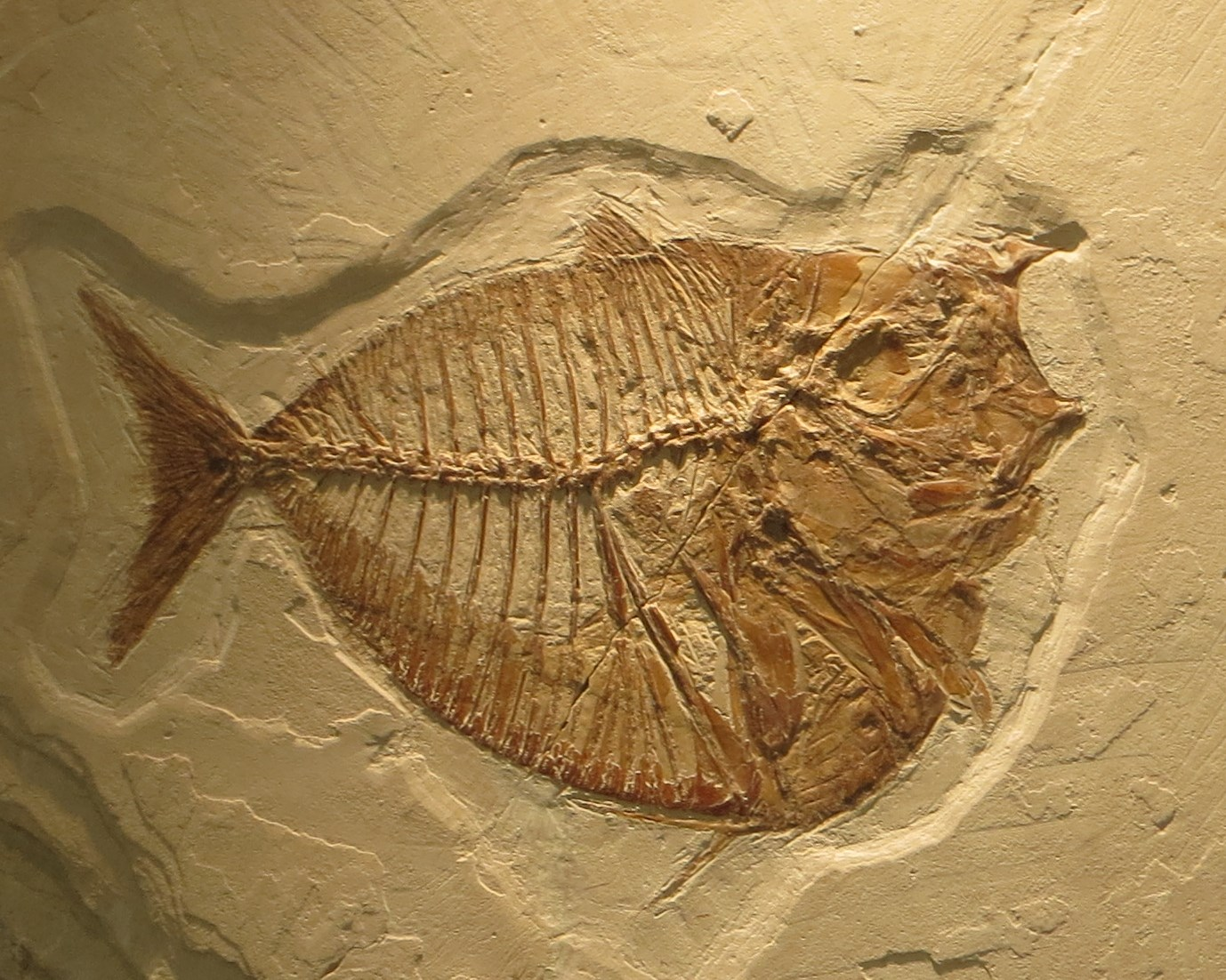
†Mene oblonga

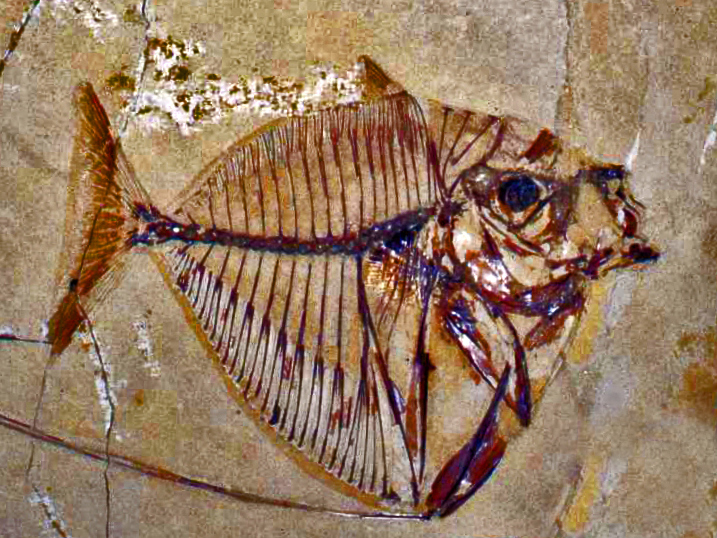
†Mene rhombea, from Monte Bolca

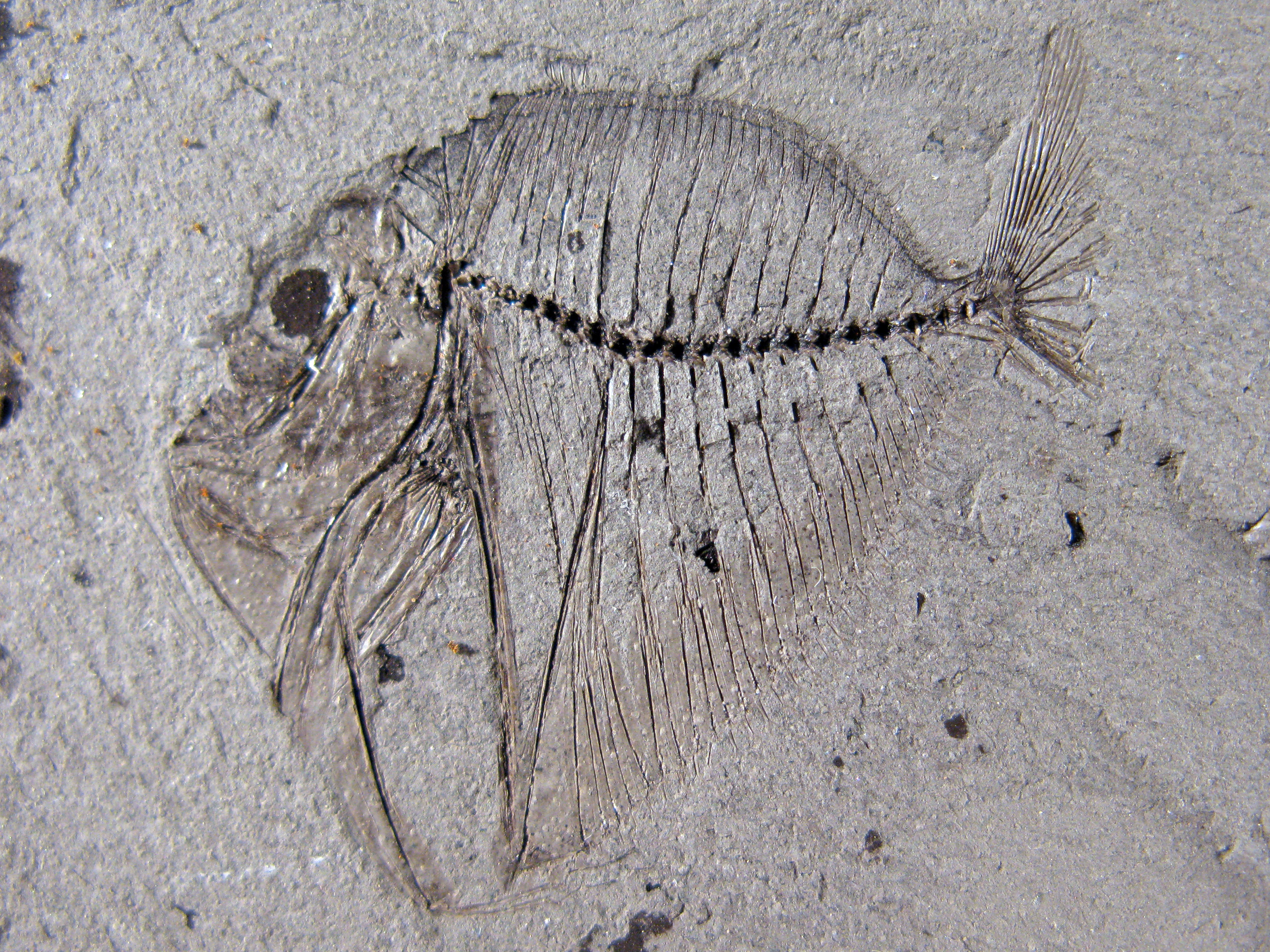
†Mene sp, from Fur Formation, Denmark

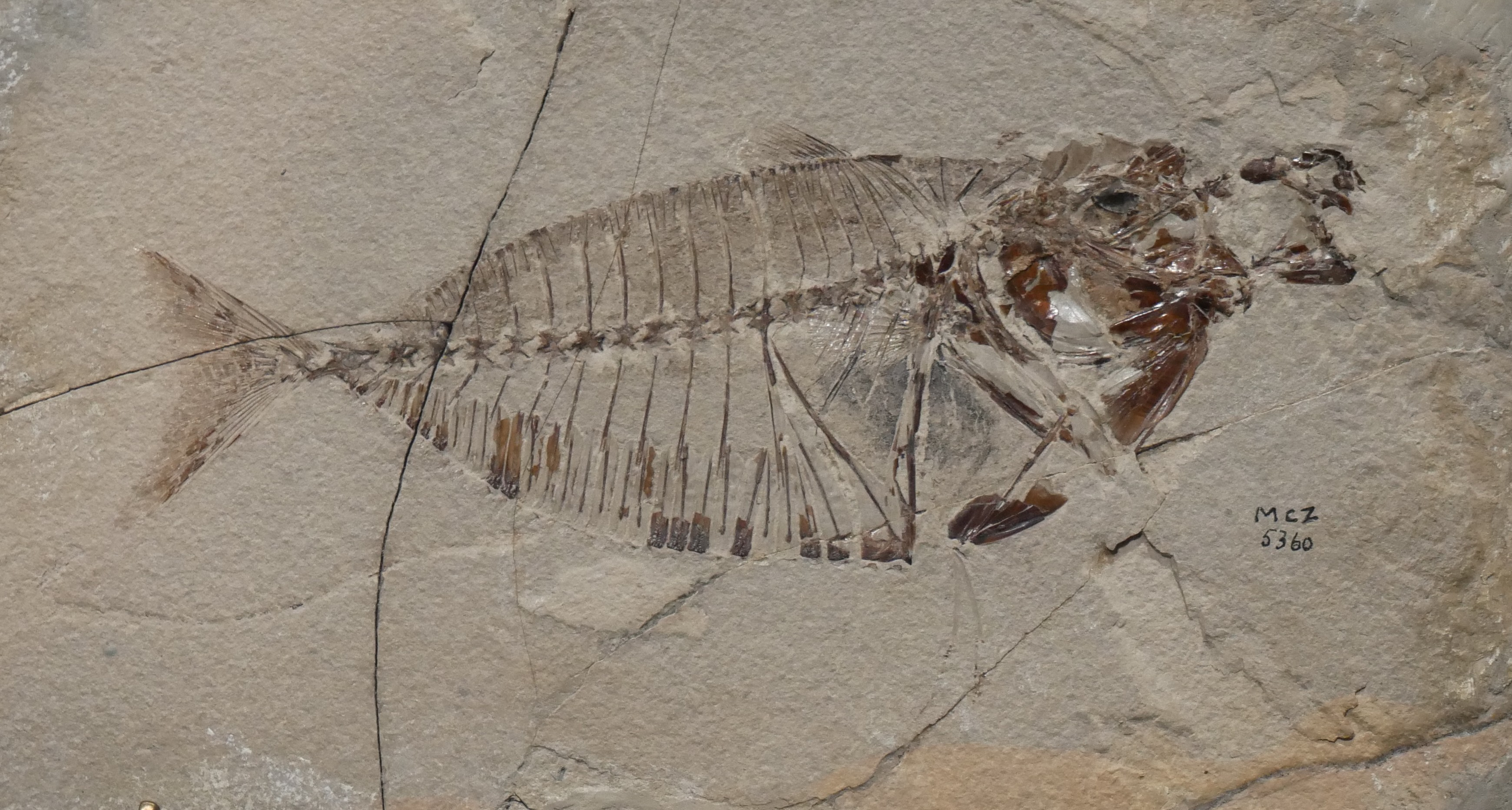
†Mene oblonga from Monte Bolca
