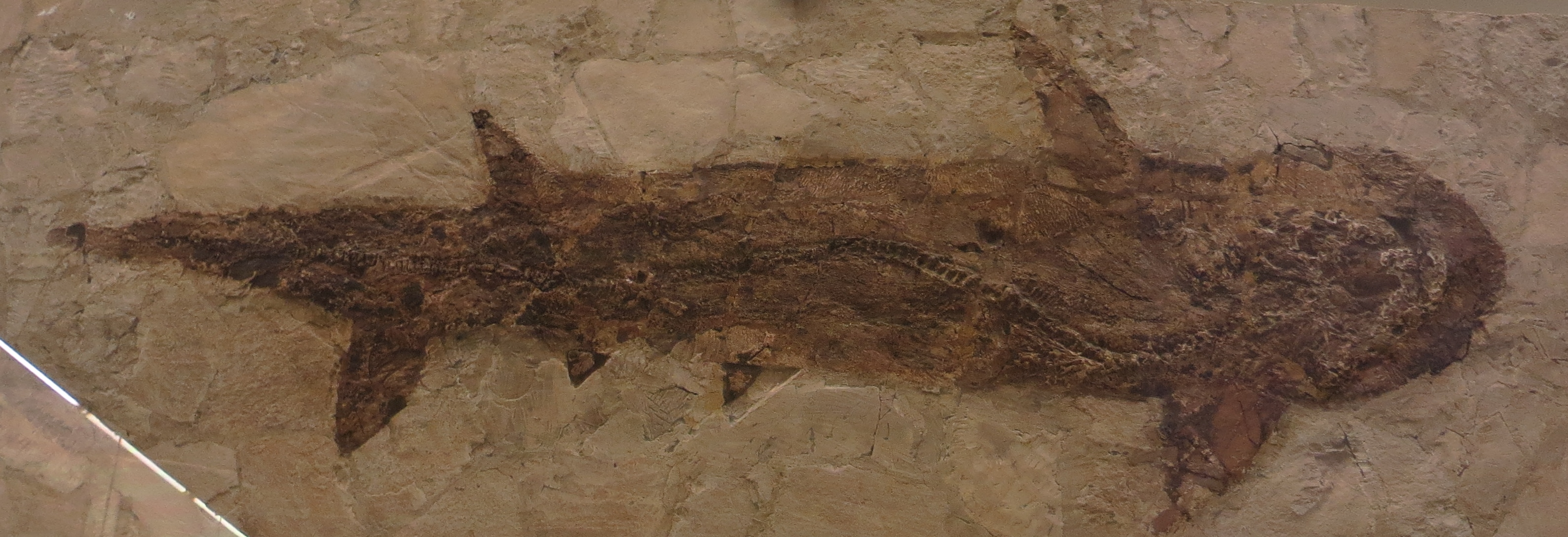
- Partially articulated skeleton from the Eocene of Italy

Scientific classification
- Kingdom: Animalia
- Phylum: Chordata
- Class: Chondrichthyes
- Subclass: Elasmobranchii
- Division: Selachii
- Order: Carcharhiniformes
- Family: Carcharhinidae
- Genus: †Eogaleus; Cappetta, 1975
- Species: †E. bolcensis

Binomial name
- †Eogaleus bolcensis Cappetta, 1975

= Eogaleus =

Eogaleus Temporal range: Ypresian

Genus of extinct requiem shark

Eogaleus is an extinct genus of requiem shark from the Eocene epoch. It contains a single species, E. bolcensis. It is known from multiple articulated individuals from the Bolca Konservat−Lagerstätte of the Ypresian of Italy. It was a shallow water species.
