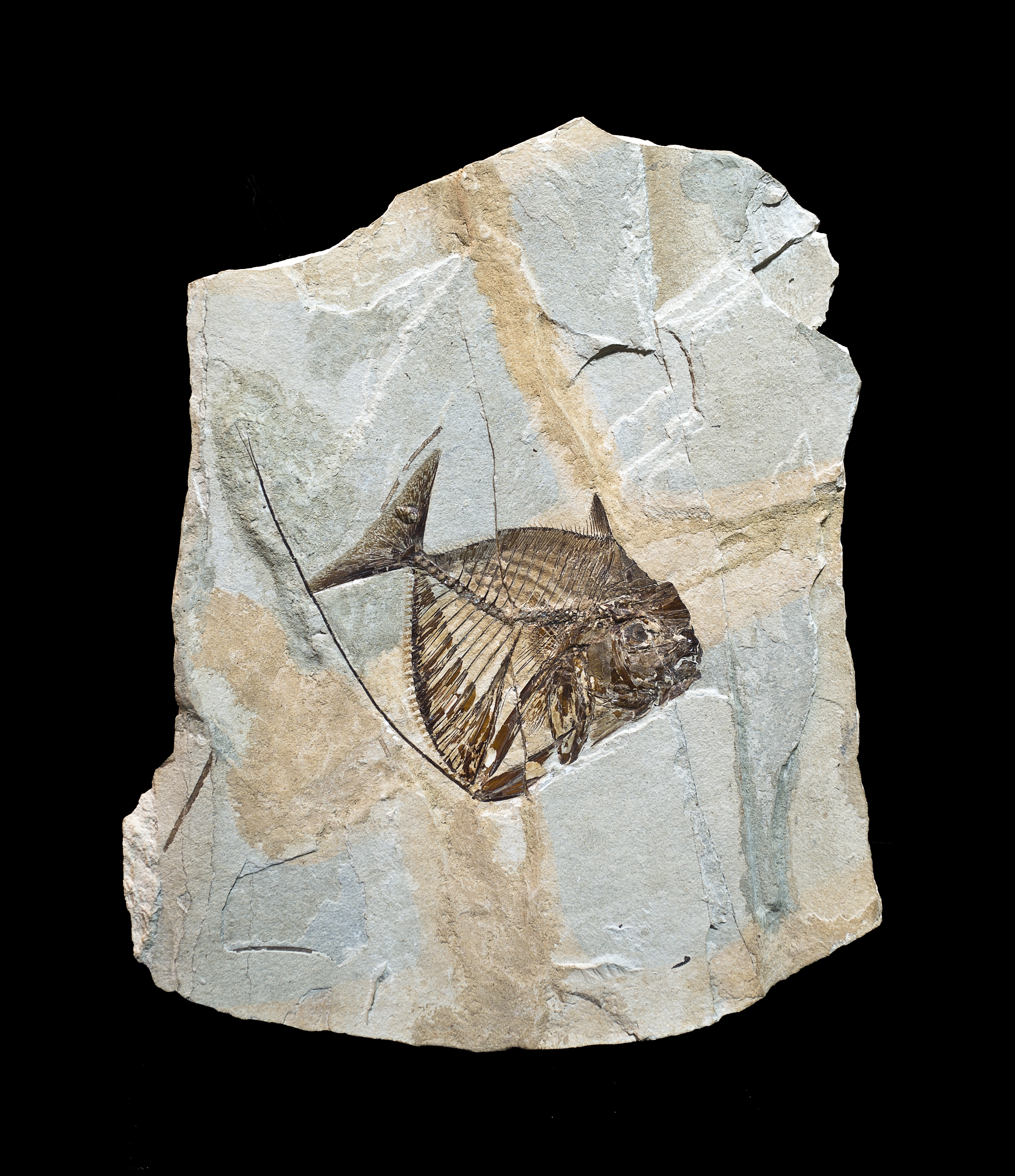
- Mene rhombea, from Mount Bolca, Verona

Scientific classification
- Kingdom: Animalia
- Phylum: Chordata
- Class: Actinopterygii
- Division: Teleostei
- Order: Carangiformes
- Family: Menidae
- Genus: Mene
- Species: †M. rhombea

Binomial name
- †Mene rhombea (Volta, 1796)

Synonyms
- Scomber rhombeus Volta, 1796; Gasteronemus rhombus

= Mene rhombea =

Mene rhombea Temporal range: Early Eocene

Extinct species of fish

Mene rhombea is an extinct perciform fish belonging to the family Menidae. During the Middle Eocene (Lutetian epoch), about 48 to 40 mya, these fishes lived in the Tethys Ocean, a large tropical sea in the area corresponding to the current Mediterranean. This ocean was extended between the continents of Gondwana and Laurasia. At this time, where Monte Bolca is today, M. rhombea, and its relative, M. oblonga, lived in a tropical lagoon.

== Description ==
Mene rhombea had a laterally compressed body, very long and slim pelvic fins and a wide triangular tail fin. As suggested by their fossils' small, upturned mouths, and by comparison of its living relative, as Mene maculata, fishes of this species were planktivore. The species shows close affinities with contemporary species inhabiting the coral reef environment of the Indo-Pacific warm seas.

== Distribution ==
Their valued fossils comes from the laggerstat Monte Bolca, about 30 kilometres north-east of Verona, Italy.

== Gallery ==
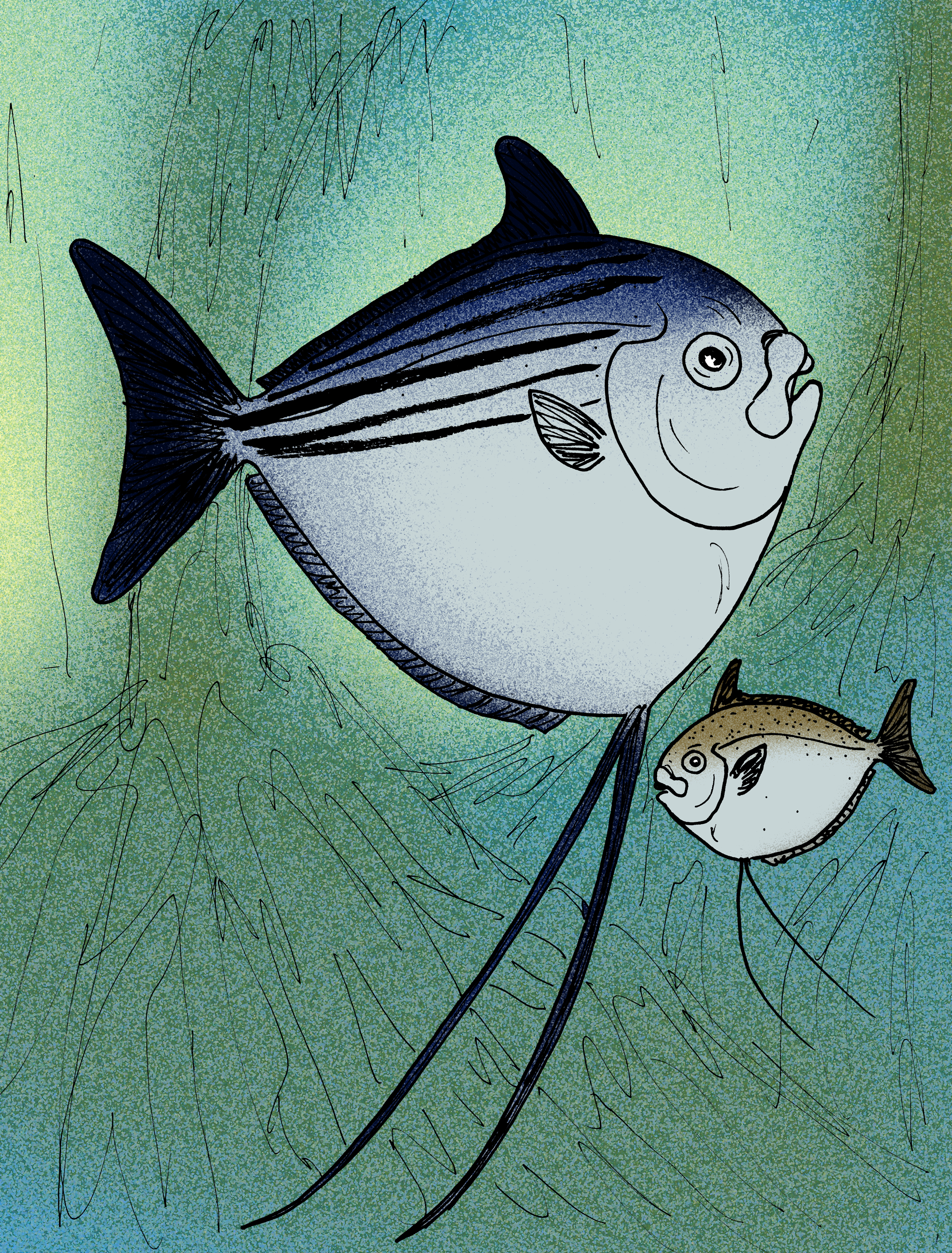
Restoration comparing †Mene rhombea and †Mene oblonga

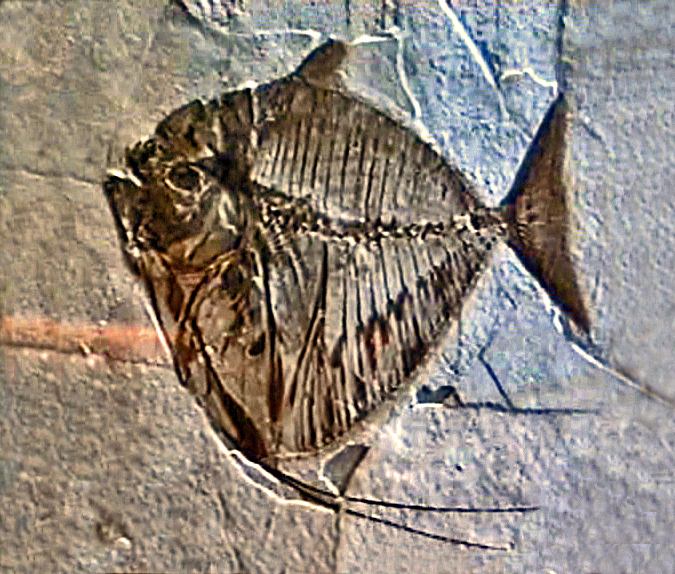
Mene rhombea, from Monte Bolca, Verona, at the Naturhistorisches Museum, Wien

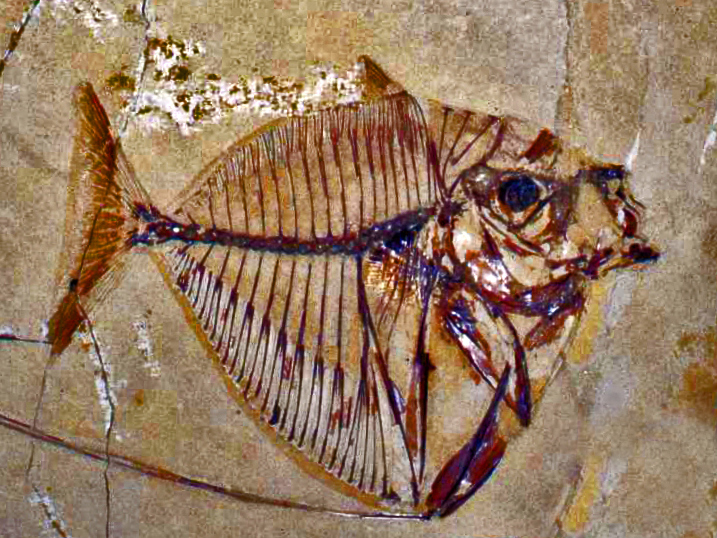
Mene rhombea, from Bolca

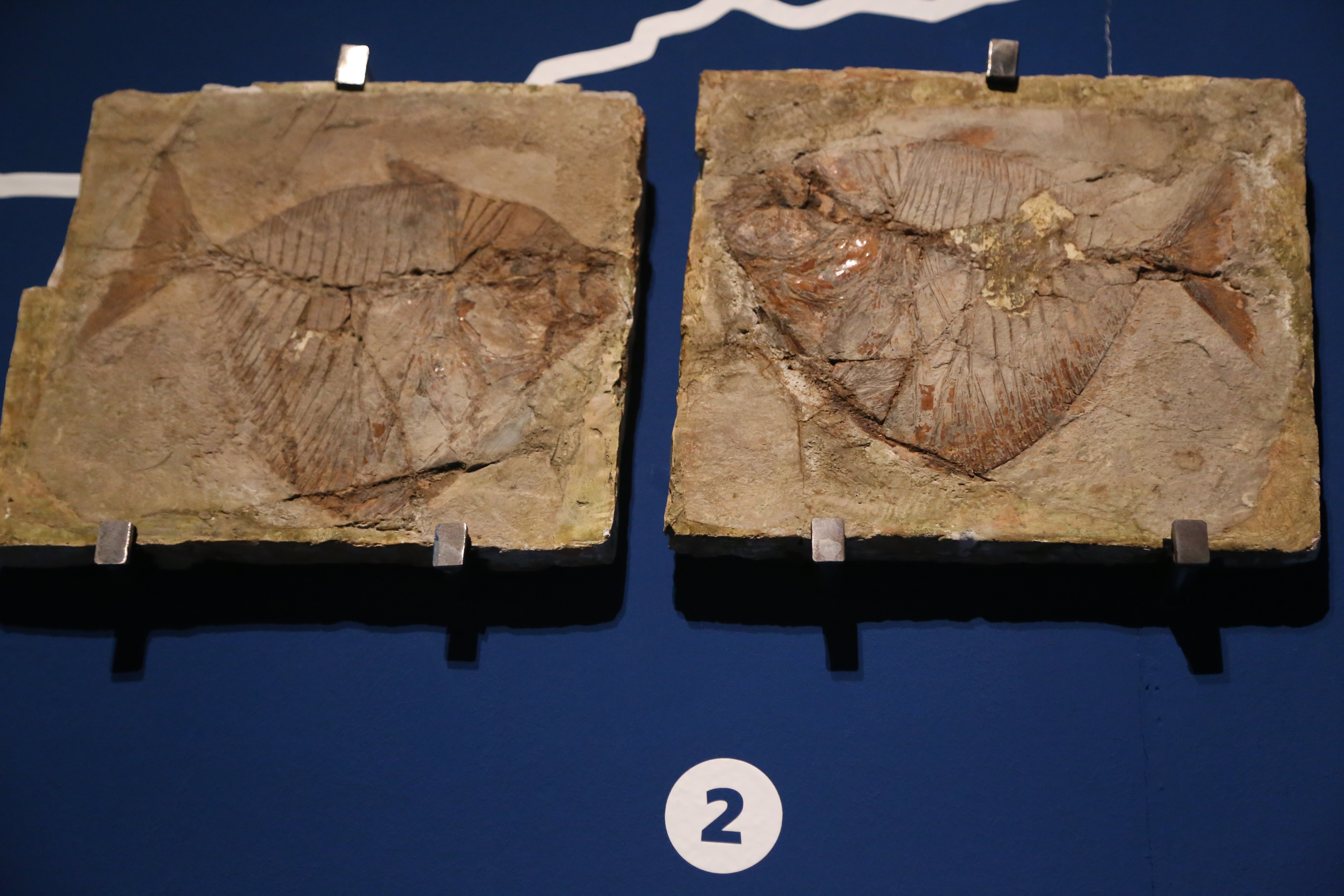
Mene rhombea specimen of the Lessini mountains in imprint and counterimpress
