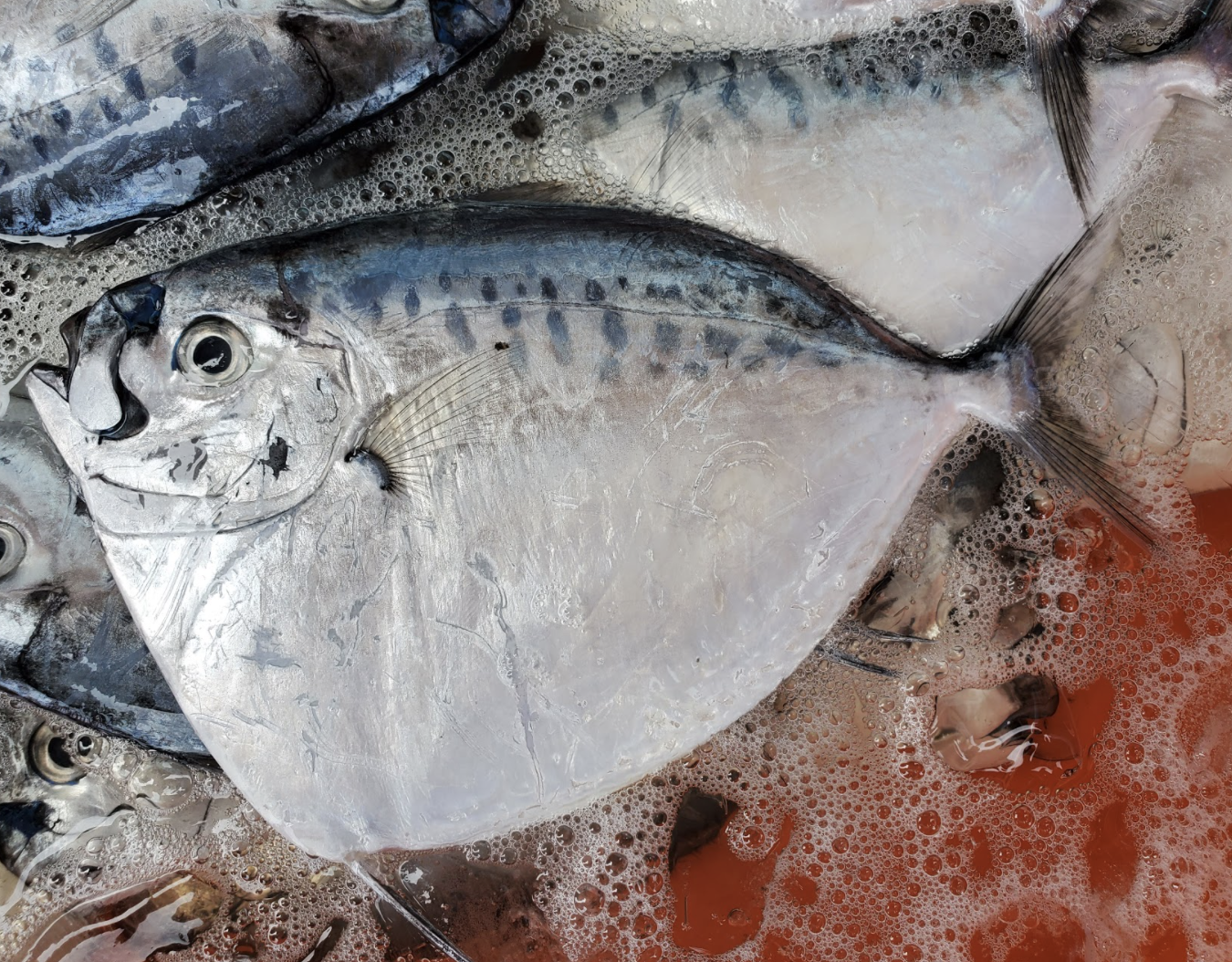
- In Taiwan

Scientific classification
- Kingdom: Animalia
- Phylum: Chordata
- Class: Actinopterygii
- Division: Teleostei
- Order: Carangiformes
- Family: Menidae
- Genus: Mene
- Species: M. maculata

Binomial name
- Mene maculata (Bloch & J. G. Schneider, 1801)

Synonyms
- Zeus maculatus Bloch & J. G. Schneider, 1801

= Mene maculata =

Species of ray-finned fish

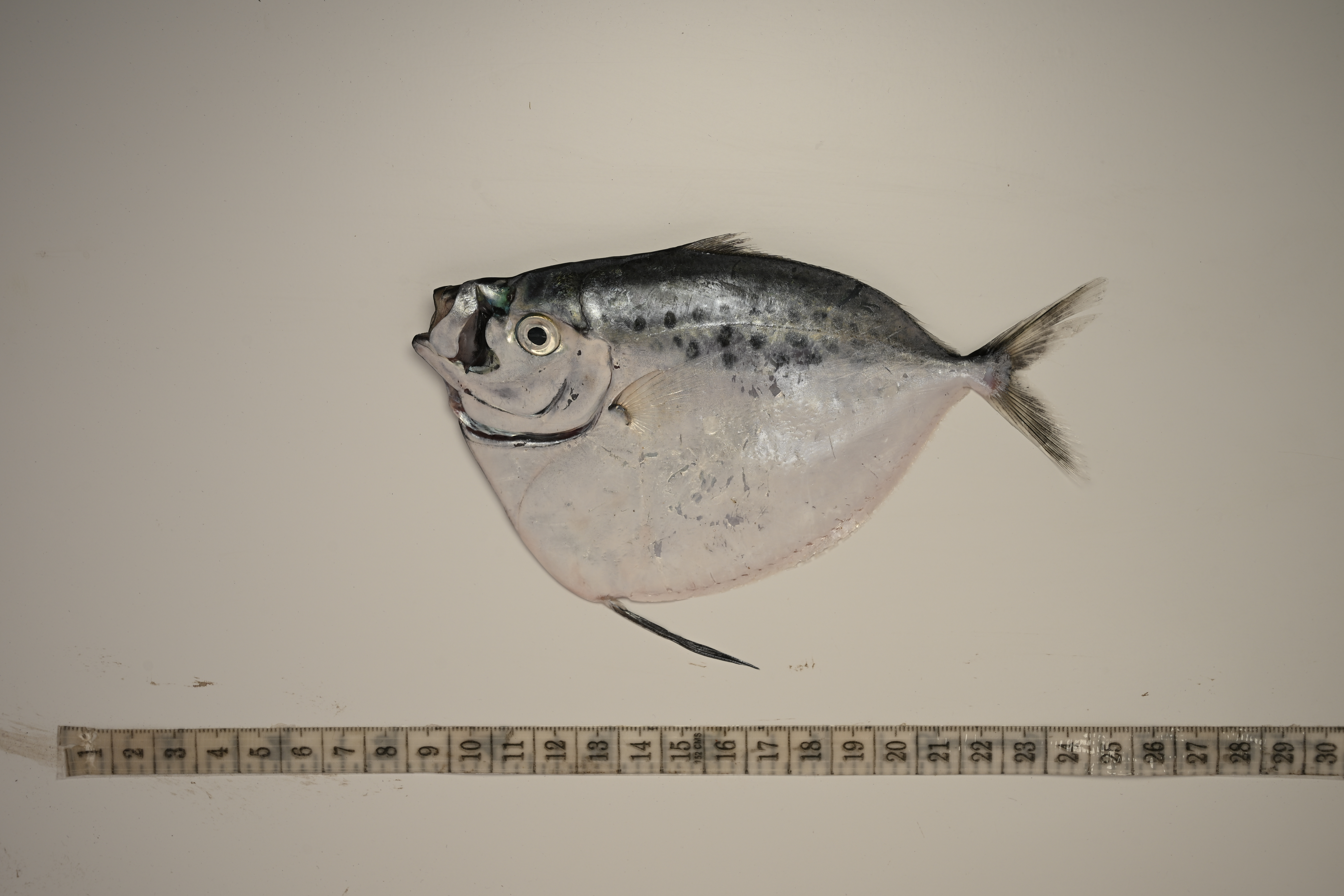
Mene maculata

Mene maculata, the moonfish, is the only extant member of the genus Mene and of the family Menidae. The morphology of the moonfish is quite distinct as they have a compressiform (laterally compressed) that is disc-like shape that is almost triangular. They have a small protrusible superior mouth (a mouth that is orientated upwards) with teeth limited to villi-form bands in the jaws. Their maxilla are distinctively shaped and have long ascending processes of the premaxillae.

The dorsal fin of the moonfish has a short peak on the anterior side. Overall, it is long and low with thin and flexible rays. The anal fin starts where the pelvic fin is and is very long. The caudal fin is deeply forked. The pectoral fin is shorter than the length of the head, and the pelvic fins are slightly in front of the pectoral fins. The pelvic fin has 1 short spine followed by 5 soft rays. The first 2 soft rays are fused and greatly elongated in the adults, forming a prominent backward-pointing process on the underside of the fish. There is not much known about the hatchling and juvenile state. The lateral line curves upward toward the base of the last ray of the dorsal fin and ends above the midline of the caudal peduncle. Sometimes the lateral line continues to the base of the upper lobe of the caudal fin.

The body of the moonfish is covered with scales that are invisible to the naked eye. The dorsal side of the body has a deep metallic blue color, with the rest of the body being silver in color. On the upper and lower sides of the lateral line holds a row of circular-ovular shape of dark slaty-blue spots. There may be a few additional spots above and below the rows. The pelvic fin has a trace of blue color, and the other fins are slightly dusky in color or hyaline.

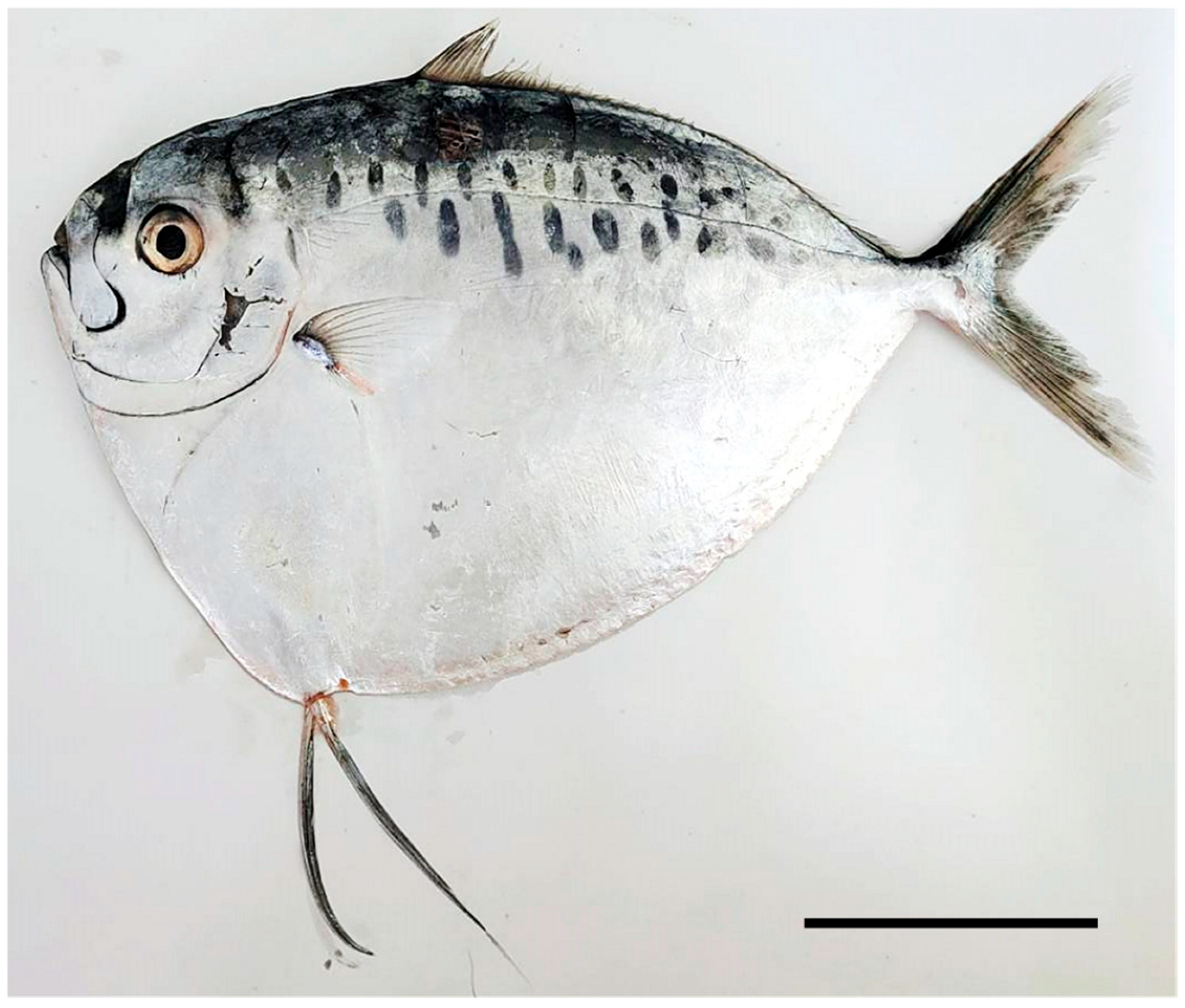
Image of Mene maculata (scale 5cm)

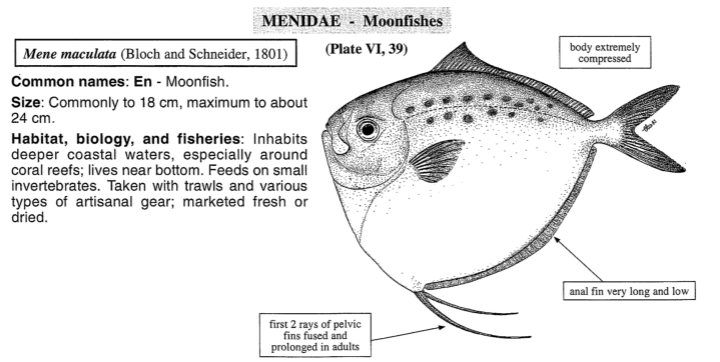
Figure of Mene maculata

Image and figure of Mene maculata

Figure of Mene maculata

== Ecology ==
The moonfish live in marine to brackish waters and are known to inhabit midwater columns. They display weak to moderate swimming agility. These fish are bottom feeders, which is supported by the high percentage of mud and sand particles in their guts, along with other major food items. They are often found near the bottom of continental shelves and major island groups where they primarily feed on copepods, shrimp, and fish larvae. Because they eat such high-nutrient-filled prey, they play a crucial role in transferring energy to apex predators such as marlins, mahi-mahi, and tuna.

Mene maculata are highly fragile with high mortality rates and increased vulnerability of their eggs and larvae to predation. The moonfish is also sensitive to strict environmental conditions. The exact maximum age of Mene maculata is not known, but based on a study, the maximum age is approximately 3 years of age. The relative size of the fish as an adult ranges from 21.8 to 33.4 cm, and the maximum weight of the moonfish is less than 500g.

== History ==
Mene maculata, the moonfish, is the only extant member of the genus Mene and of the family Menidae. This family is morphologically distinct as they have a compressiform type of body (laterally compressed) that is disc-like and a small superior mouth (a mouth that is orientated upwards). Their maxilla are distinctively shaped and have long ascending processes of the premaxillae. This unique morphology characterizes the only extant member of Menidae, Mene maculata. It is also conserved over the known recent and numerous fossil species and history.

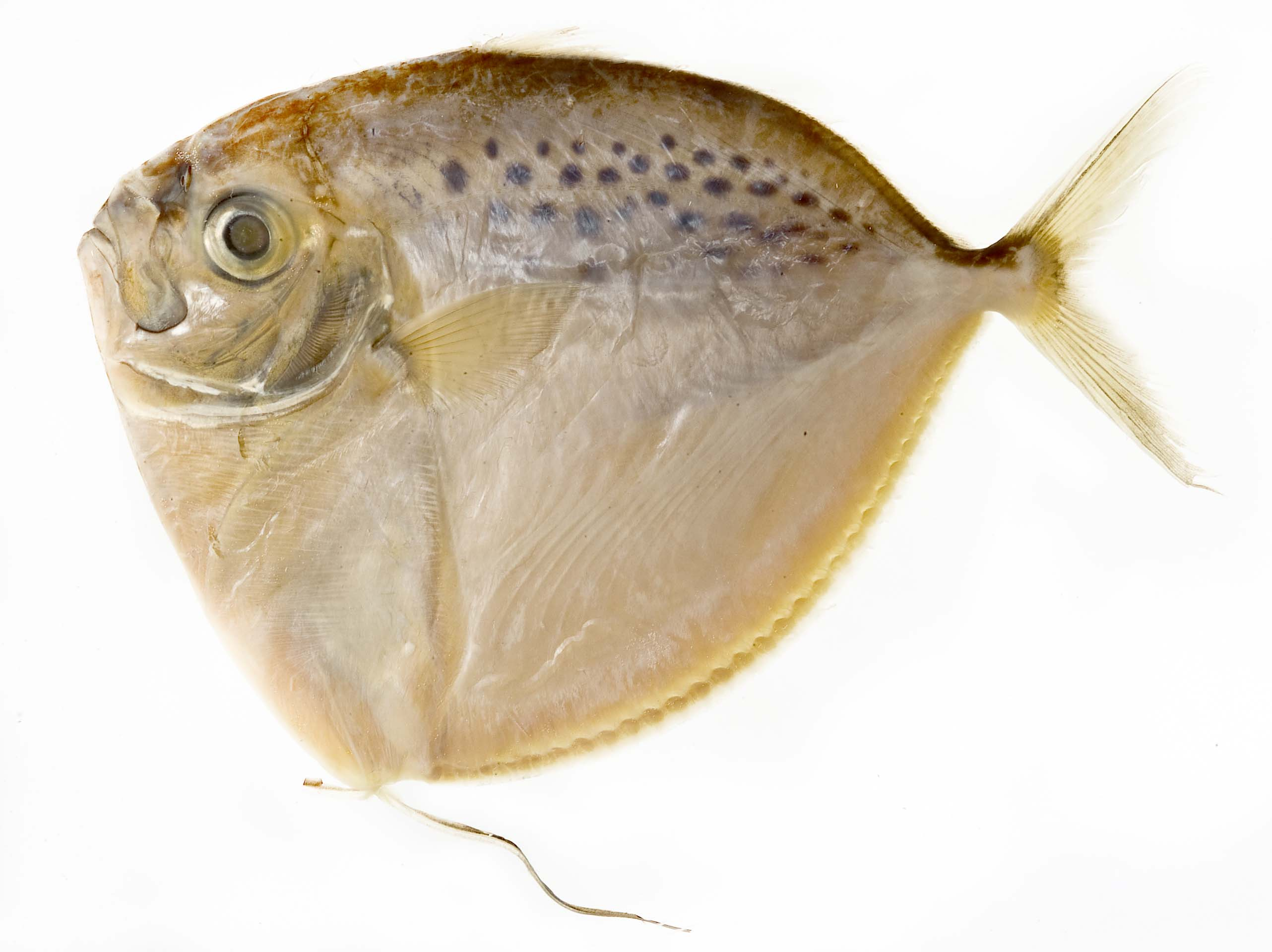
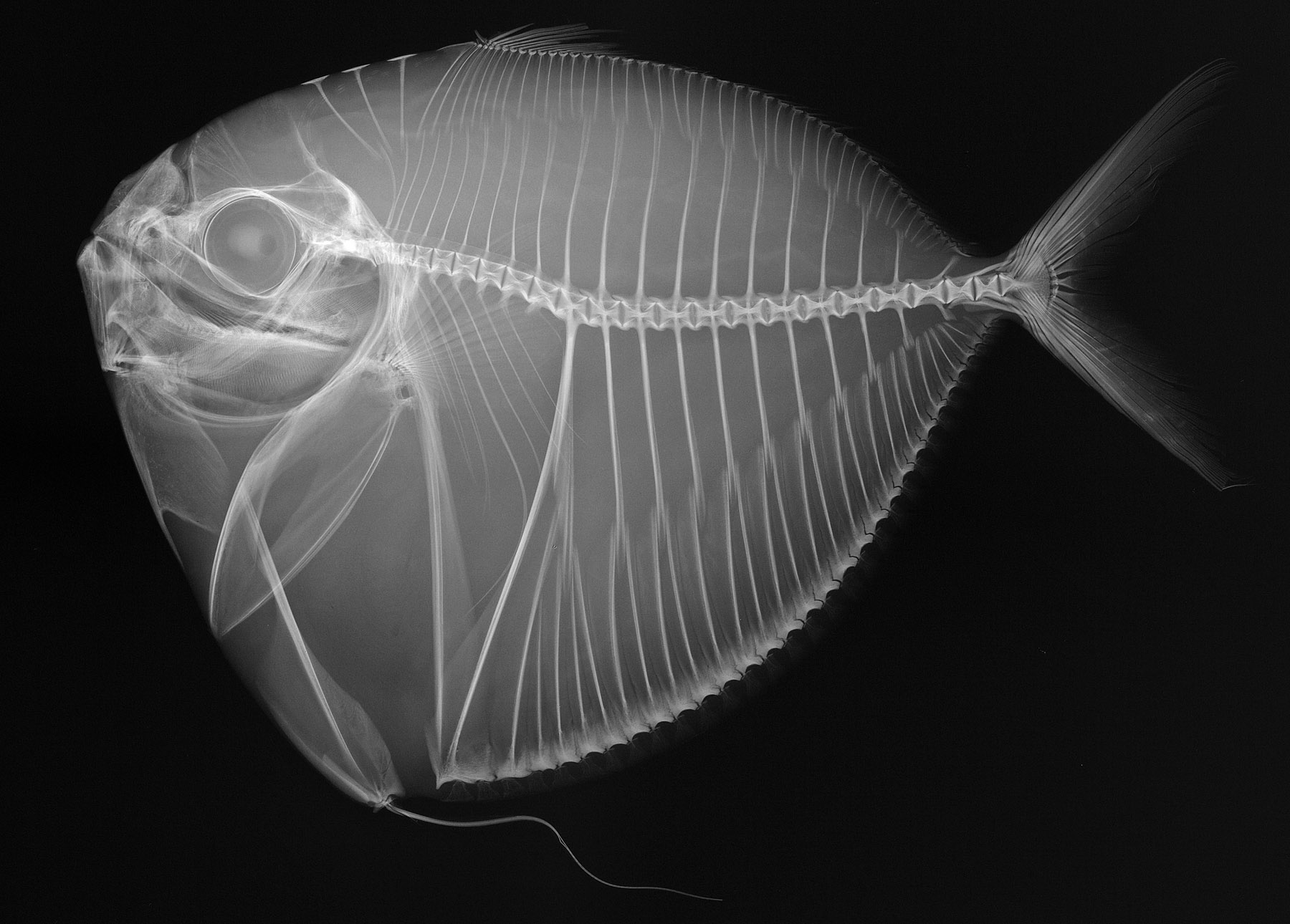
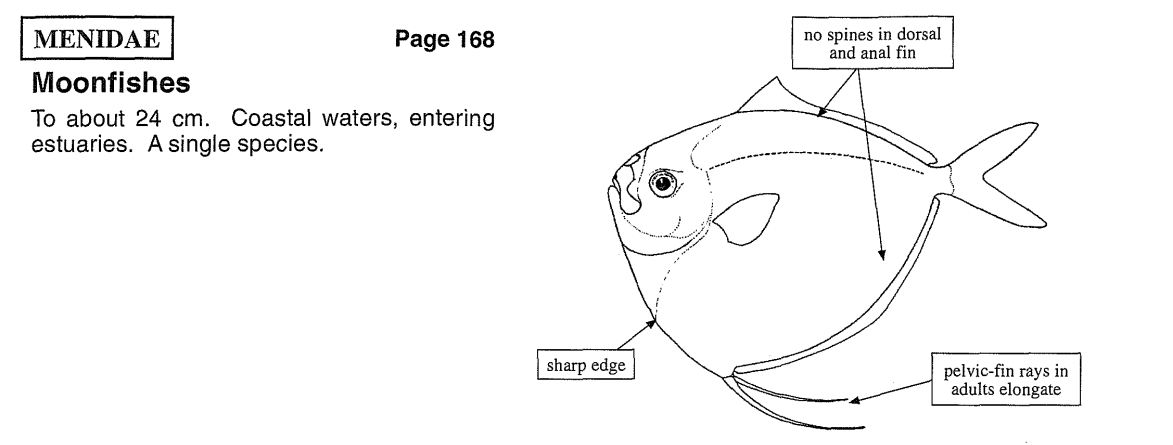
Mene maculata, conventional and X-ray images and Family

Figure of Family Menidae

== Geographic Location ==
Mene maculata is native to the western and eastern Indian Ocean, and the northwest, western central, and southwest of the Pacific Ocean. However, this species is distributed in the South China Sea, Arafura Sea, east to New Caledonia, Indo-Pacific tropical waters from East Africa (as far south as Durban) to southern Japan, and northeastern Australia. Mene maculata is known to school and inhabit deeper coastal water, living at the depths of 50-200m, especially around coral reefs. They are commonly found near the bottom of continental shelves and major island groups and are sometimes found in estuaries.

== Feeding and Diet ==
It is not known when the moonfish feed, but based on various studies, moonfish that are caught around dawn have a nearly empty stomach or are only one-third full are caught more often at night rather than during the day, which may imply that moonfish primarily feed before early morning or other times during the day. The diet of Mene maculata comprises bony fish, crustaceans (mainly shrimps, some prawns, and crabs), and zooplankton (Calanoida and crab megalopa). Larger individuals mostly consumed more fish such as Benthosema pterotum, while smaller individuals primarily consumed zooplankton such as mysids and calanoida. Other studies showed that moonfish also feed on gastropods and bivalvia (molluscs). Some algal filaments and polychaetes were also found in the stomachs of the moonfish. Juvenile moonfish (along the eastern Arabian Sea) primarily consumed zooplankton crustaceans and shifted to cephalopods and fish as they grew. Their diets vary among size classes and time of the year, which may indicate ontogenetic dietary shifts (change in diet as the organism matures throughout its life).

== Reproduction and Life History ==
The sex ratio of this fish is 1:0.76, which is dominated by male fish. The difference in the sex ratio may be influenced by eating habits, environmental influences, and seasons. The change in season can influence food availability and can influence the fish to migrate, which may affect the ratio even more. This fish has a negative allometric growth pattern (different parts of the organism grow at different rates compared to other parts of the organism, which leads to changes in shape and proportion). This type of growth pattern is further supported by the flat and elongated body of the fish. There are variations in the growth pattern since it can be influenced by food availability, environmental conditions, geographic locations, and more.

August to October is the peak spawning season for the moonfish. The moonfish have a spawning pattern of a total spawner, where all the eggs are developed and released in a single event or a very short period of time. There is further evidence that can indicate that they are a total spawner due to Mene maculata having one peak in the distribution of egg diameter size. They produce a range of almost 12,000 eggs to about 21,000 eggs. The average fecundity is roughly 16,500 eggs. Not much is known about how long it takes for the eggs to hatch.

== Nutritional Value ==
While many major economically valuable species are declining, it is necessary to find an alternative species, such as the moonfish. However, there are not enough data to find out its biology and population. Mene maculata have a high percentage of protein in their tissue (23.16%), followed by lipids (2.62%), and carbohydrates (1.3%). The fish's tissue is a valuable food recipe for human consumption, due to its high-quality protein and well-balanced amino acids. The lipid content of the moonfish is found to be suitable for a healthy diet. This species also has the highest levels of calcium and other minerals. It has been said that the moonfish can be used as an alternative source of regular seafood that supplies rich nutrients for growing children, pregnant women, and people suffering from malnutrition. They are marketed fresh and dried.

== Management Efforts ==
The conservation status of the Mene Maculata is unknown. Further data needs to be collected on its population size, rate of decline, and range. Further management efforts need to be taken to maximize its resource potential. Another management effort that needs to be taken is reducing catches of fish that have not reached mature gonad size. A larger gonad size contributes to larger eggs. Larger eggs would lead larger size at the time of hatching, which provides the hatchling greater energy reserves to grow and survive. It is feared that catching Mene maculata before the gonads could mature could affect the population since the moonfish do not have enough time to spawn and continue their offspring. Another management effort that can be made is by adjusting the mesh size of the payang fishing gear to become more selective in catching fish. Otherwise, fishing activity needs to be adjusted to help reduce the intensity of moonfish fishing during the August–October peak spawning season.

Fisheries management and conservation strategies should adopt a precautionary ecosystem-based approach for moonfish. Recent climate-ecosystem models project that nutritious zooplankton will decline and gelatinous plankton will increase. If global warming leads to fewer prey items and lower-quality prey items for the Mene maculata, it may lead to declines in productivity. This suggests a need to alter and adjust harvest levels or protect critical feeding grounds during vulnerable periods.

The moonfish is a prospective commercial species in Taiwanese waters. It is important economically as an edible fish in Taiwan. This fish accounts for almost 98% of Taiwanese purse seine capture. The fishing catch has been steadily increasing over recent years.

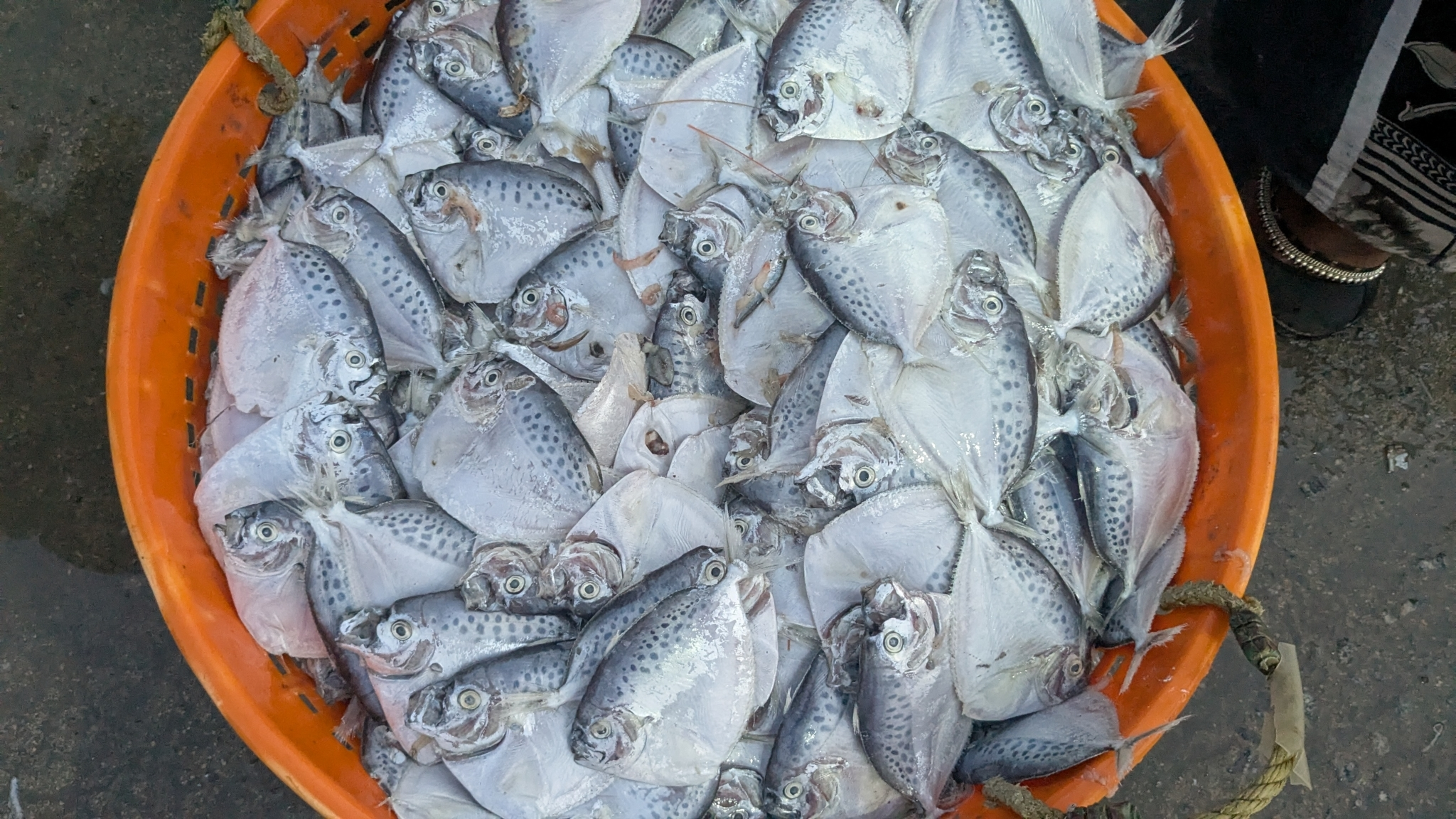
Basket of Mene maculata

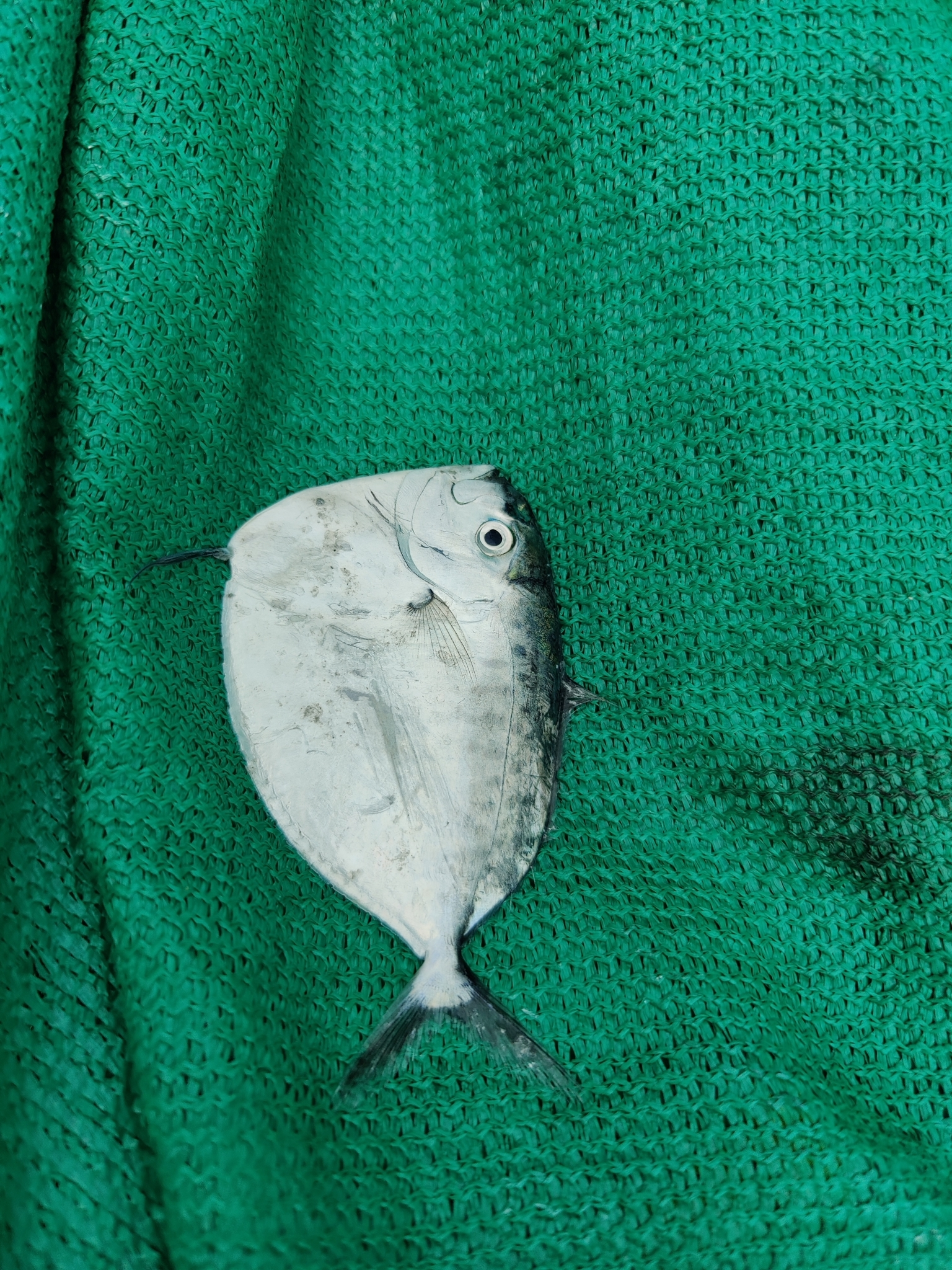
Mene maculata in net

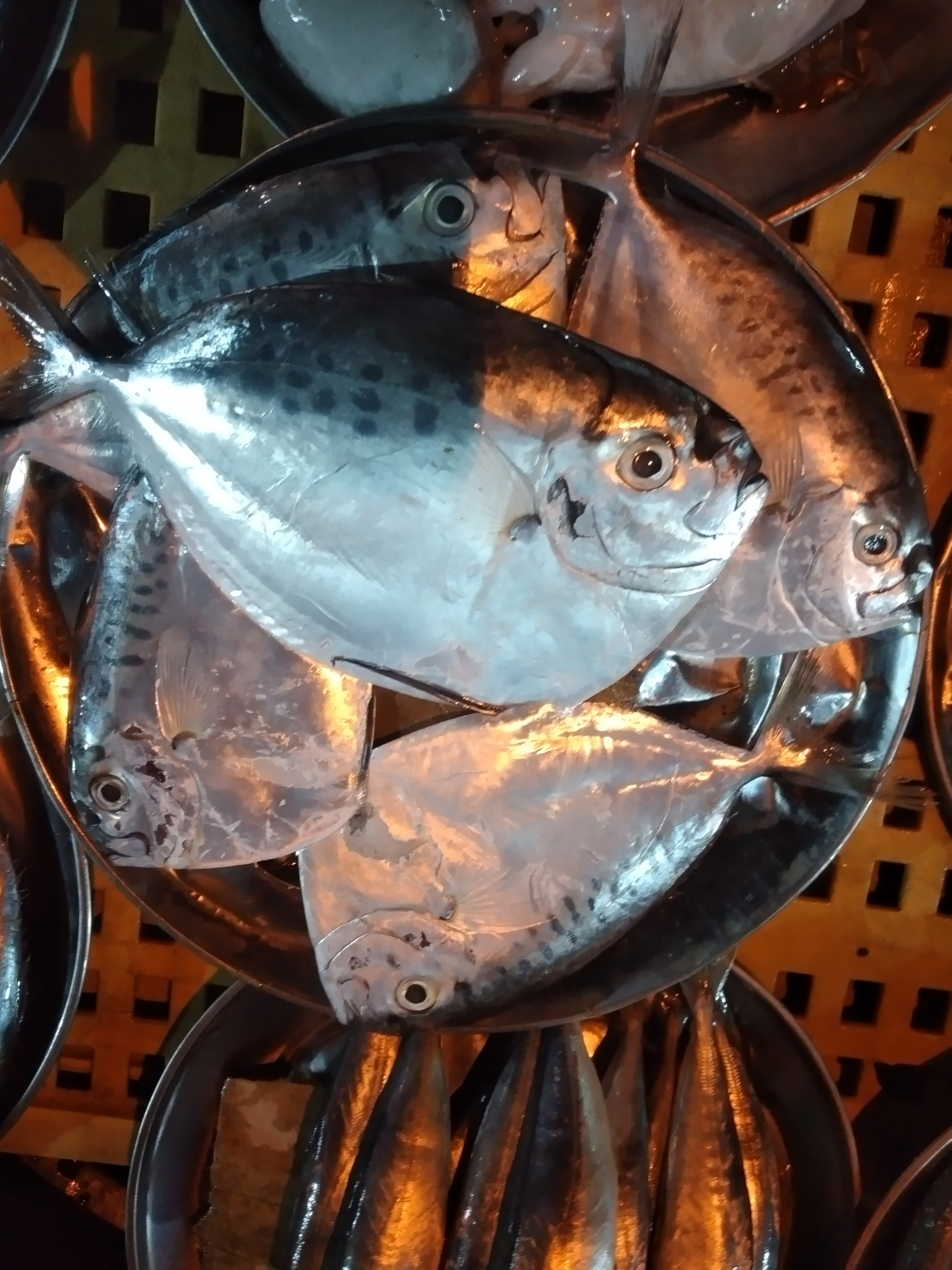

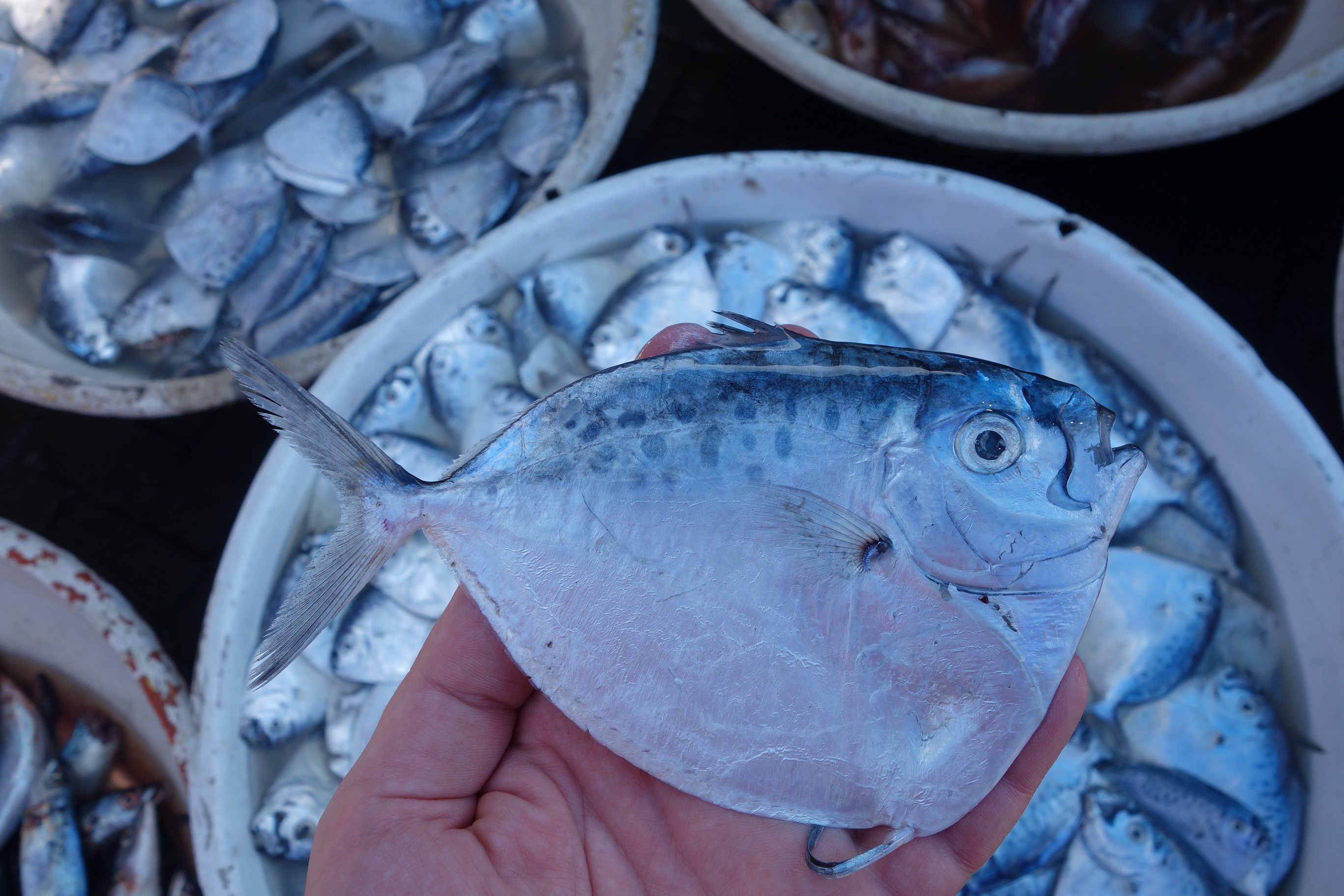

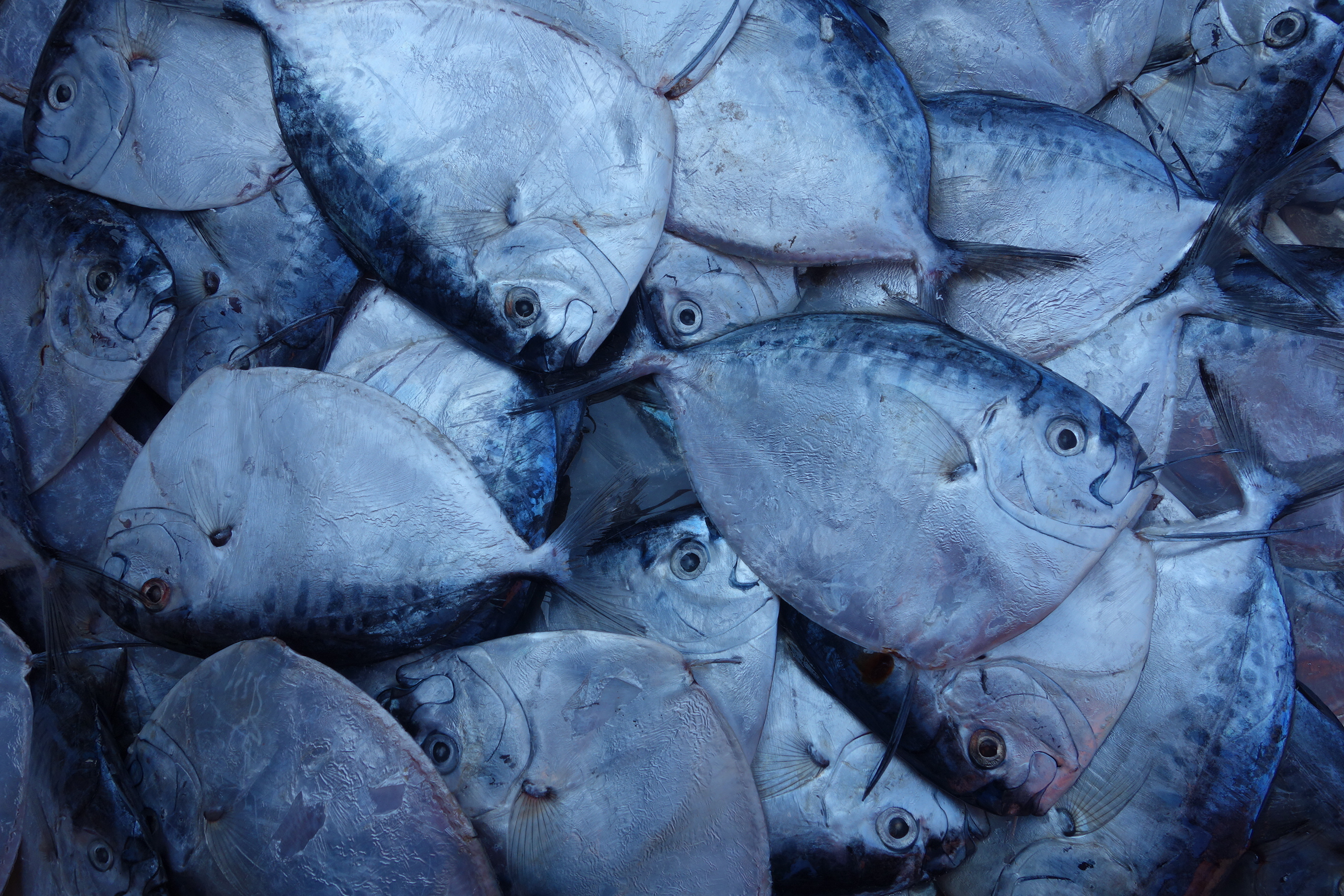

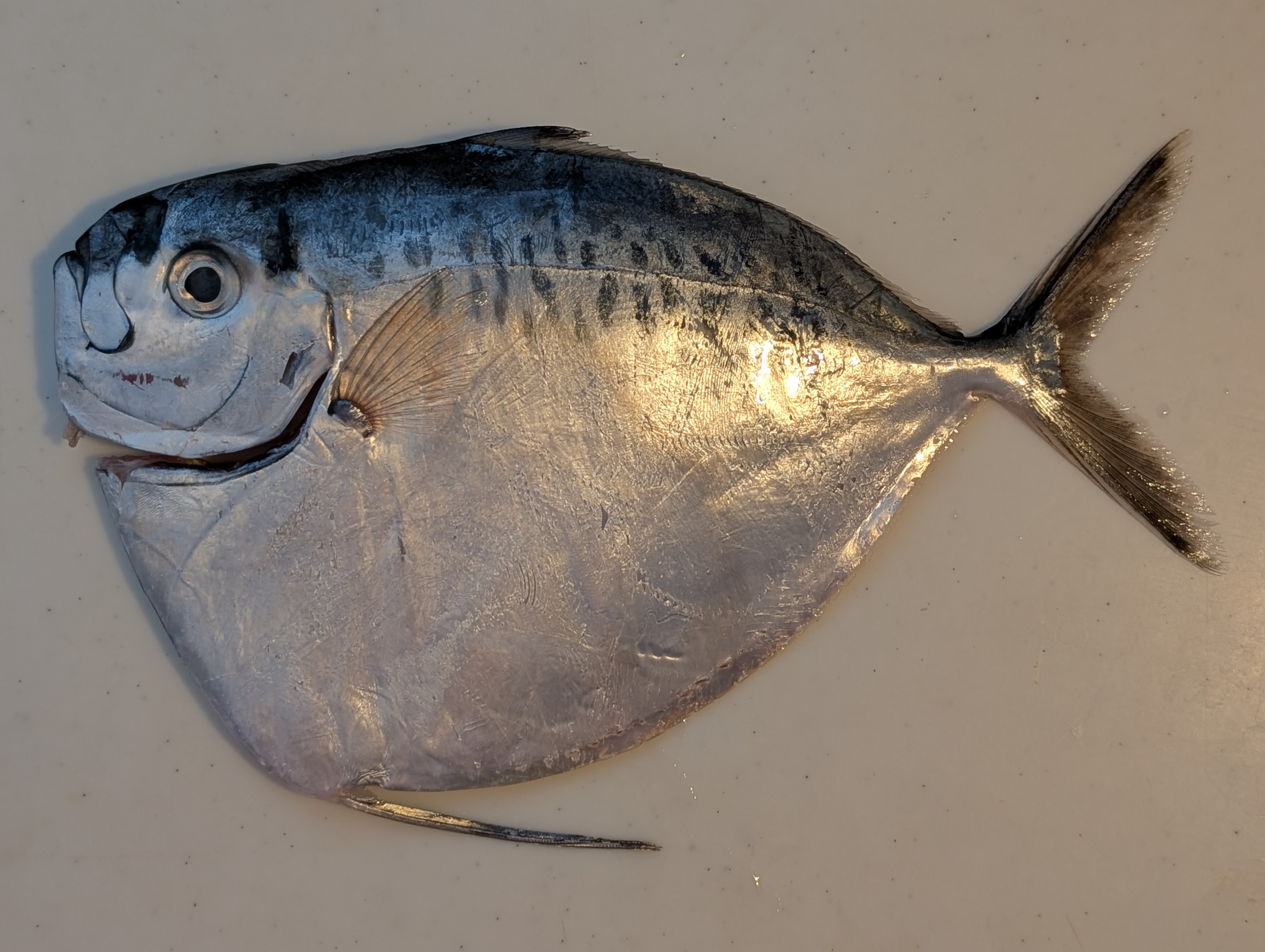

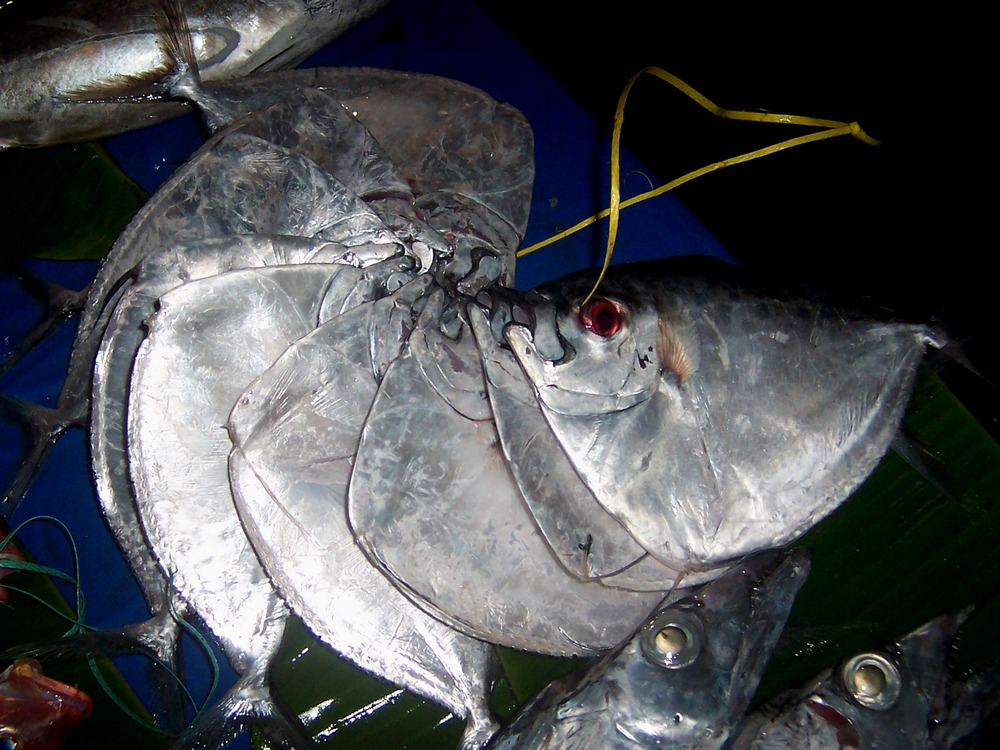

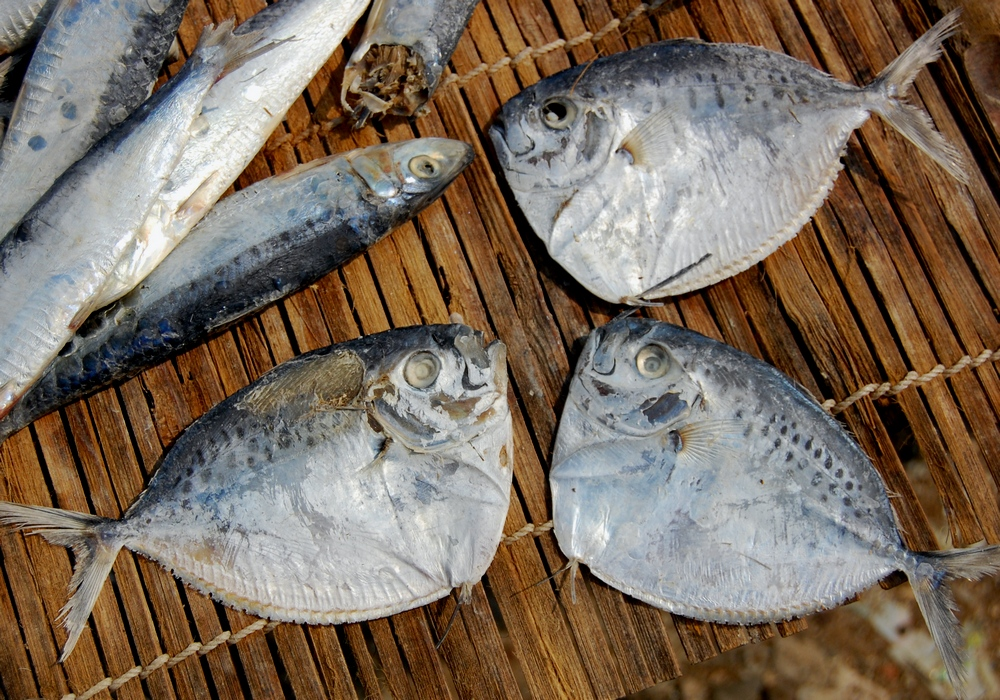
