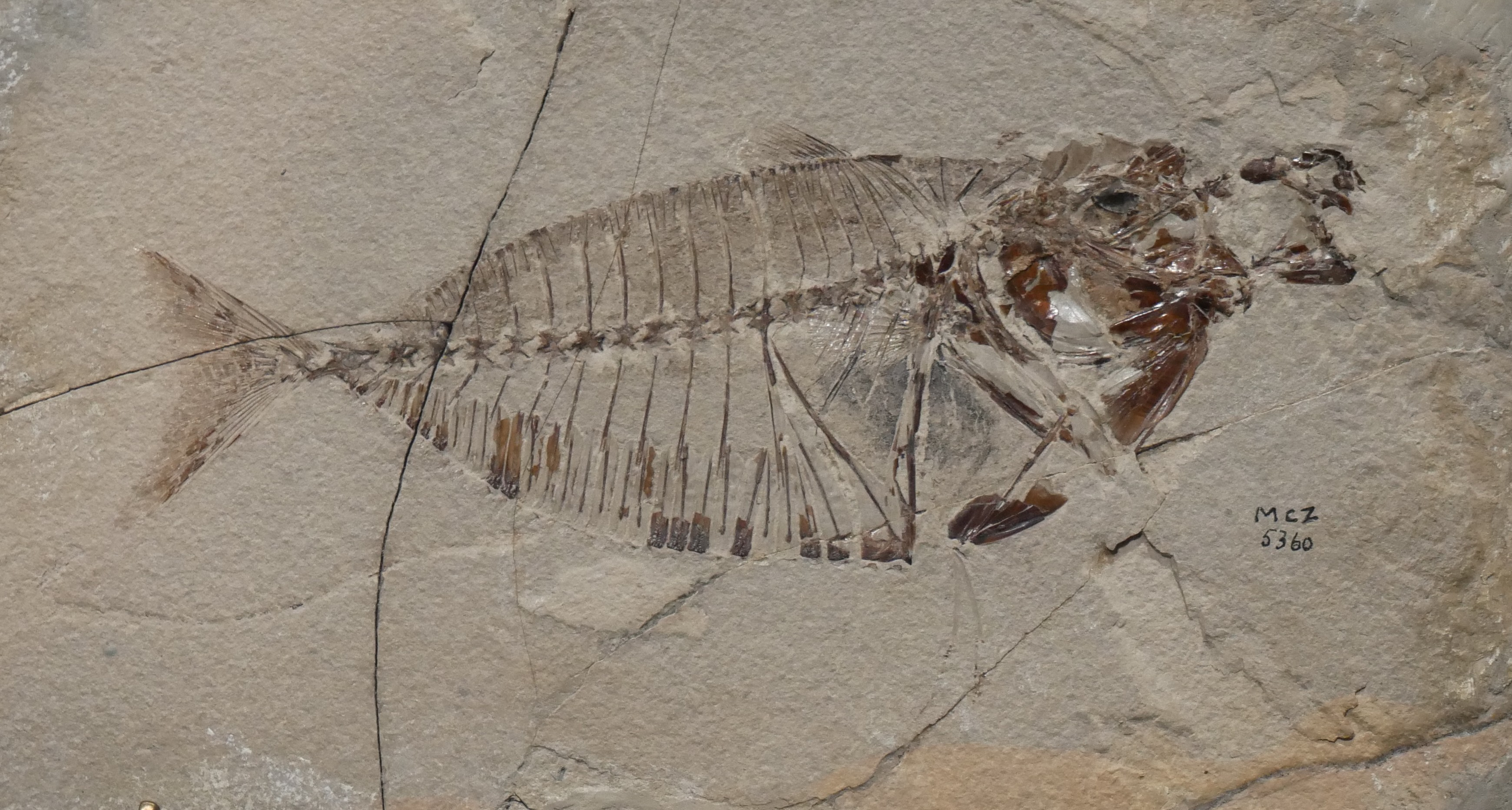
- Fossil specimen at the Museum of Comparative Zoology

Scientific classification
- Kingdom: Animalia
- Phylum: Chordata
- Class: Actinopterygii
- Order: Carangiformes
- Family: Menidae
- Genus: Mene
- Species: †M. oblonga

Binomial name
- †Mene oblonga Agassiz, 1833

= Mene oblonga =

Mene oblonga Temporal range: Lutetian to Early Oligocene

Extinct species of fish

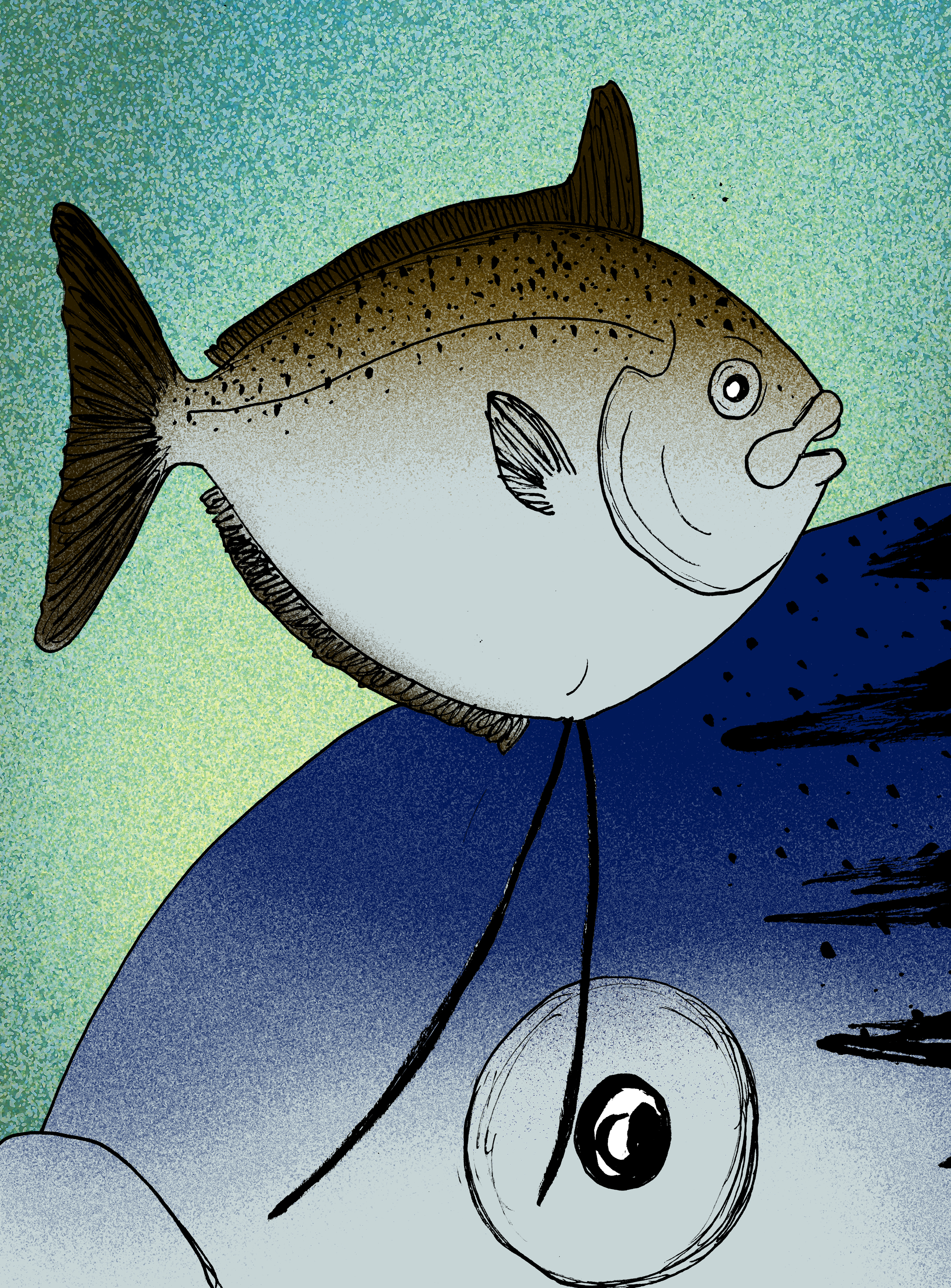
Artist's reconstruction

Mene oblonga is an extinct species of ray-finned fish that first appeared in the Monte Bolca Lagerstatten during the Lutetian epoch of the Eocene. For a menid, it has a very shallow body, especially in comparison with the sympatric Mene rhombea. Its fossils are very rare in Monte Bolca. A single fossil from the early Oligocene, referred to as "Mene oblonga var. pusilla," was found in Chiavon, Italy.
