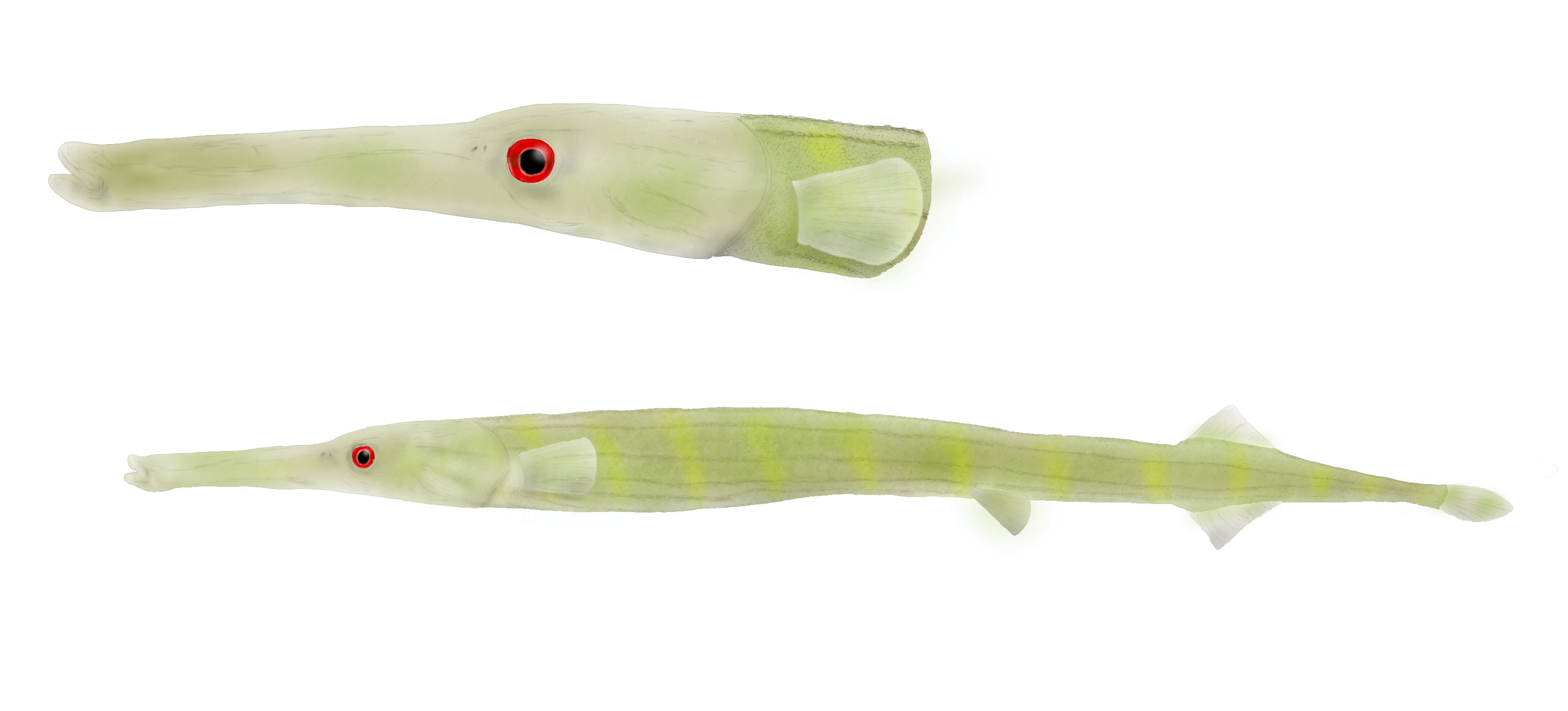

Scientific classification
- Kingdom: Animalia
- Phylum: Chordata
- Class: Actinopterygii
- Order: Syngnathiformes
- Suborder: Syngnathoidei
- Family: †Protosyngnathidae; Boulenger, 1902
- Genus: †Protosyngnathus von der Marck, 1876
- Species: †P. sumatrensis

Binomial name
- †Protosyngnathus sumatrensis von der Marck, 1876

Synonyms
- †Auliscops sumatranus Gunther, 1876; †Aulorhynchus sumatranus (Gunther, 1876)

= Protosyngnathus =

Protosyngnathus Temporal range: early-middle Eocene

Genus of fishes

Protosyngnathus ("original Syngnathus") is an extinct genus of freshwater syngnathiform fish known from the early-mid Eocene. It contains a single species, P. sumatrensis from the Sangkarewang Formation of the Ombilin Basin in Sumatra (Indonesia).

== Taxonomy ==
As its name suggests, it closely resembles the related pipefish, but has clear morphological distinctions from them and other elongated syngnathiforms. Phylogenetic studies generally recover it as more closely related to pipefish and ghost pipefish than to other elongated syngnathiforms, like trumpetfish and cornetfish.

The type specimen is a mostly complete individual described by von Der Marck (1876). Five more specimens (previously misidentified as specimens of the fossil trumpetfish Fistularia koenigii) were identified the same year in the Natural History Museum, London by Albert Gunther, who independently described the species the same year as Auliscops sumatranus. Auliscops was found to be preoccupied, and it was thus reclassified into the genus Aulorhynchus. However, it was reclassified back into Protosyngnathus in 1902 when its morphology was found to be distinct of that from Aulorhynchus. Many more specimens were figured by Sanders (1934), but all of these appear to now be lost.

== Description ==
From the discovered specimens, it can be inferred that Protosyngnathus measured 33,8 cm in standard length. The head takes up to 26.6% of its standard length . The skull bear an ornamentation of closely spaced, small rounded tubercles that radiate in rows from the ossification centres to cover the entire bone. For the dentary, the holotype show that Protosyngnathus had a long and low dentary with a few, small conical teeth

The body have V-shaped scutes (thicker than scales, and clearly ornamented) that run in series along the ventral edge of the body. The scutes are ornamented with rows of small round tubercles and some have ridge running across the middle from edge to edge. There are six rows in total of the scutes that run along the fish body. While the scute are fairly visible albeit not completely, the fins are very poorly preserved. This condition applied to the dorsal, anal, and caudal fins.

== Paleoecology ==
Unlike other early syngnathiforms such as Gasterorhamphosus and Eekaulostomus that come from marine deposits, Protosyngnathus are believed to have inhabited a freshwater environment. The Sangkarewang Formation has been reconstructed as a fairly large, stable rift lake, possibly with an anoxic bottom. Protosyngnathus is believed to have spent its entire life in fresh water. The presence of this fish in Eocene freshwater deposit indicates that at least one lineage of syngnathiforms had invaded freshwaters fairly early in the history of the group.
