= Aulostomoides =

Aulostomoides Temporal range: Early Eocene

Scientific classification
- Kingdom: Animalia
- Phylum: Chordata
- Class: Actinopterygii
- Order: Syngnathiformes
- Superfamily: Aulostomoidea
- Genus: †Aulostomoides; Blot, 1980
- Species: †A. tyleri

Binomial name
- †Aulostomoides tyleri Blot, 1980

Extinct genus of fishes

Aulostomoides is an extinct genus of prehistoric marine ray-finned fish from the early Eocene. It contains a single species, A. tyleri from the Monte Bolca site of Italy. It is thought to be a member of Aulostomoidea, making it a relative of trumpetfish and cornetfish.
