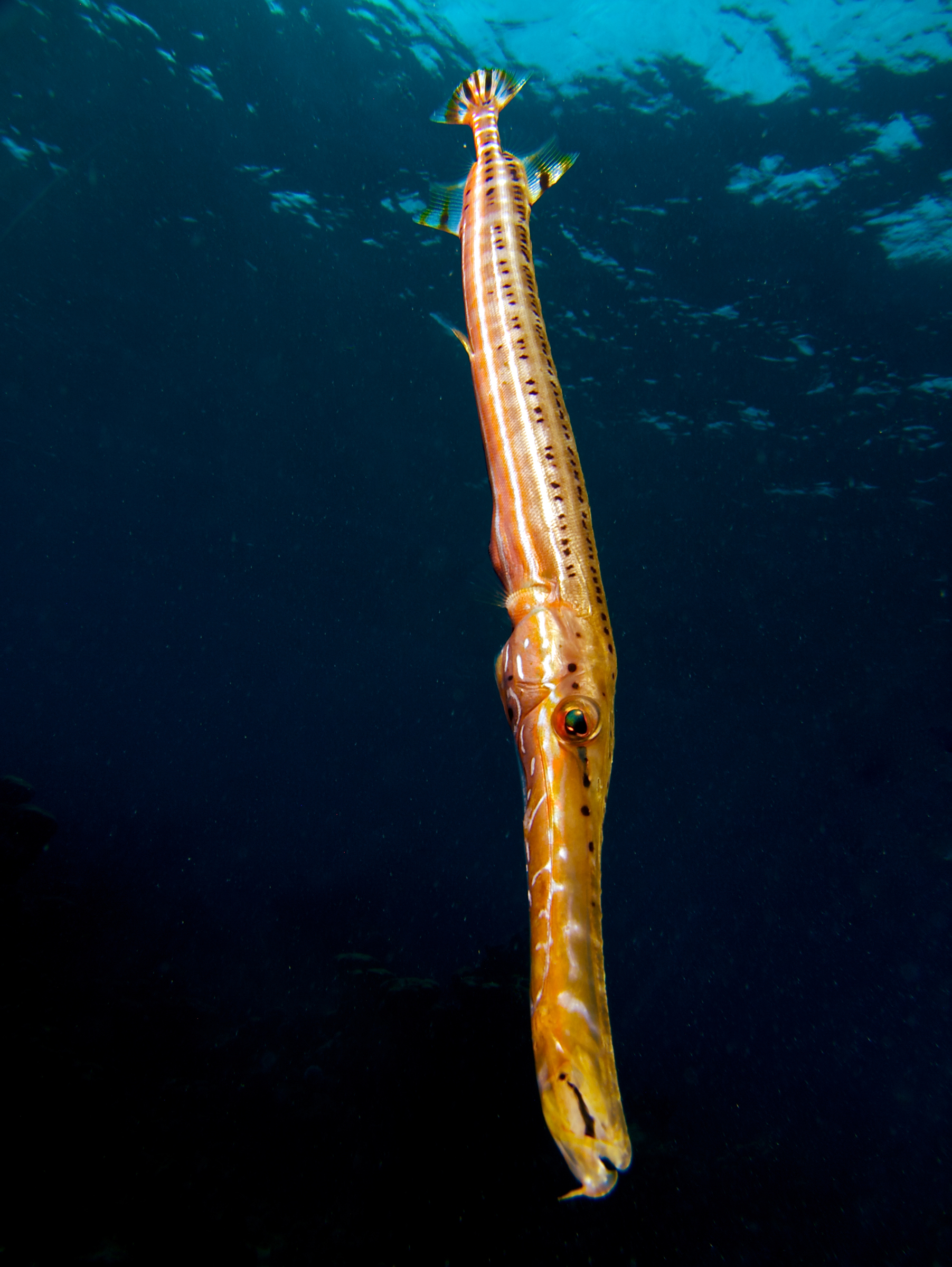

Conservation status
- Least Concern (IUCN 3.1)

Scientific classification
- Kingdom: Animalia
- Phylum: Chordata
- Class: Actinopterygii
- Division: Teleostei
- Order: Syngnathiformes
- Family: Aulostomidae
- Genus: Aulostomus
- Species: A. maculatus

Binomial name
- Aulostomus maculatus Valenciennes, 1841

Synonyms
- Aulostoma cinereus Poey, 186; Aulostoma coloratum Müller & Trischel, 1848

= Aulostomus maculatus =

Species of fish

Aulostomus maculatus, the West Atlantic trumpetfish, is a long-bodied fish with an upturned mouth. It often swims vertically while trying to blend with vertical coral, such as sea rods, sea pens, and pipe sponges.

== Description ==
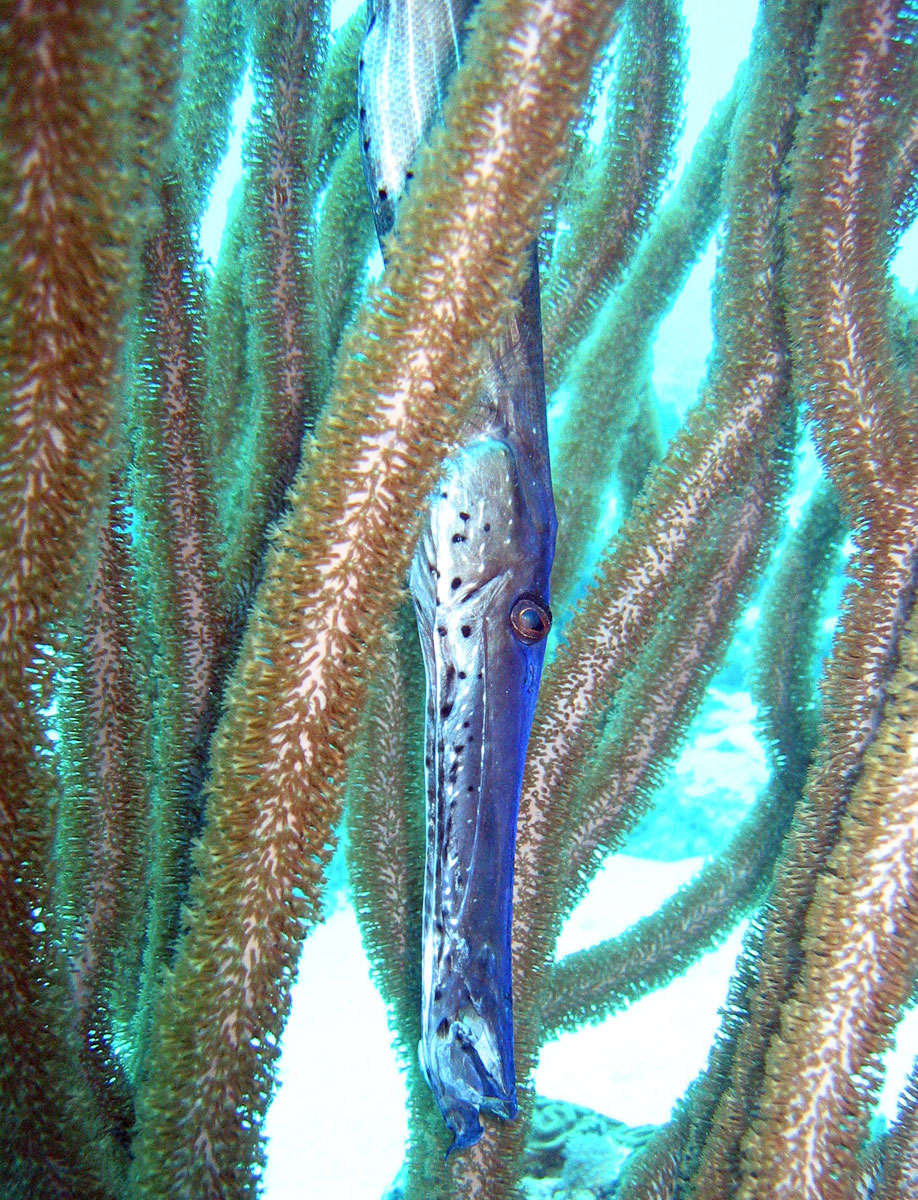
Close-up of a blue-gray trumpetfish

Aulostomus maculatus is closely related to cornetfish. This species can be a bit more than 36 inches (91 cm) long and have greatly elongated and compressed bodies, with a compressed head which has with small jaws at the front end of their long, tubular snouts. There is a distinct barbel on the chin positioned at the tip of at the lower jaw. The dorsal and anal fins are positioned posteriorally. The dorsal fin has 8-12 well-spaced and isolated spines in front of it and has 12 spines and 12-25 soft rays. The anal fin has 21-25 soft rays while the caudal fin is rounded. The most commonly encountered color of A. maculatus is mottled brown to reddish brown with irregular black or brown spots. They may also be blue-gray, bright yellow or green and this species has the ability to change its color to camouflage itself. The head and flanks have transverse silvery streaks and the base of the dorsal and anal fins have a black bar which is sometimes reduced to a spot. There may be one or two spots on the tail.

A. maculatus grow to a maximum reported length of 100 centimetres (39 in) in total length, although 60 centimetres (24 in) is more common.

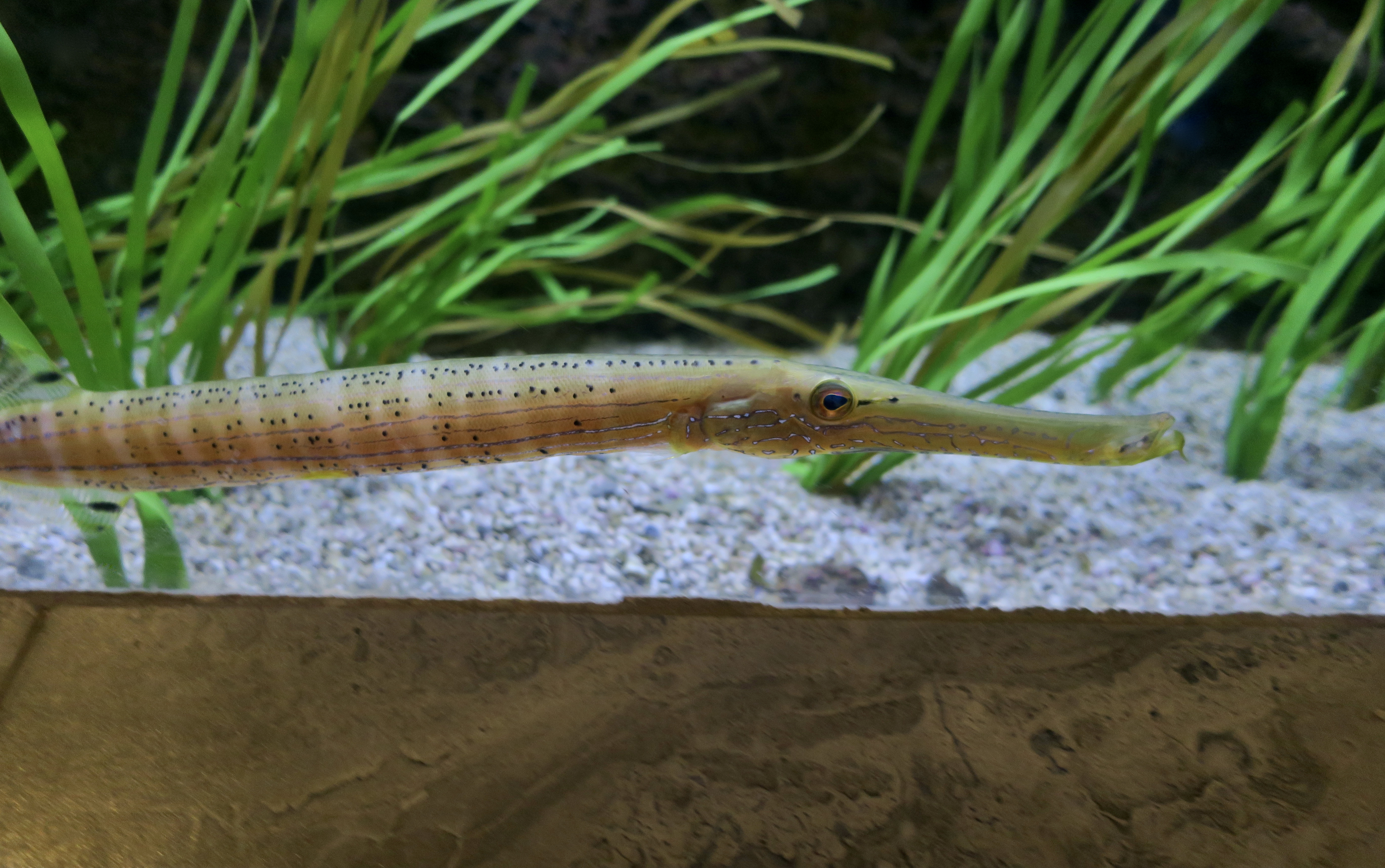
An individual swimming horizontally at Wildlife World Zoo.

== Distribution ==
Aulostomus maculatus is widespread throughout the tropical waters of the western Atlantic Ocean from Florida to Brazil including the Caribbean Sea and the Gulf of Mexico, although the most southerly records may actually be of the related species Aulostomus strigosus.

== Habitat and biology ==
Trumpetfish is a largely piscivorous ambush predator which is known to hide among shoals of large herbivorous fish, shadowing the fish until it is close enough to a prey item to strike. It will also hang vertically among gorgonians or drift with the current, capturing any prey that swims underneath it by sucking them into the mouth which has elastic tissues to allow it to open as wide as the diameter of its body. The sudden opening of the mouth creates a vacuum which pulls prey into the mouth. Recorded prey include ocean surgeon (Acanthurus bahianus), blue chromis (Chromis cyanea), tomtate grunt (Haemulon aurolineatum), French grunt (Haemulon flavolineatum), longspine squirrelfish (Holocentrus rufus), downy blenny (Labrisomus kalisherae), dusky blenny (Malacoctenus gilli), redlip blenny (Ophioblennius atlanticus), rusty reefgoby (Priolepis hipoliti), spotted goatfish (Pseudupeneus maculatus), reef squirrelfish (Sargocentron coruscum), yellowtip damselfish (Stegastes pictus), and Bluehead wrasse (Thalassoma bifasciatum). Shrimp will also be taken. Stegastes planifrons often aggressively attack trumpetfish but these attacks do not appear to disrupt the trumpetfish's hunting. Normally solitary hunters, trumpetfish frequently associate with schools of striped parrotfish (Scarus iseri) to avoid attacks from S. planifrons and in these circumstances they have higher feeding rates than solitary fish.

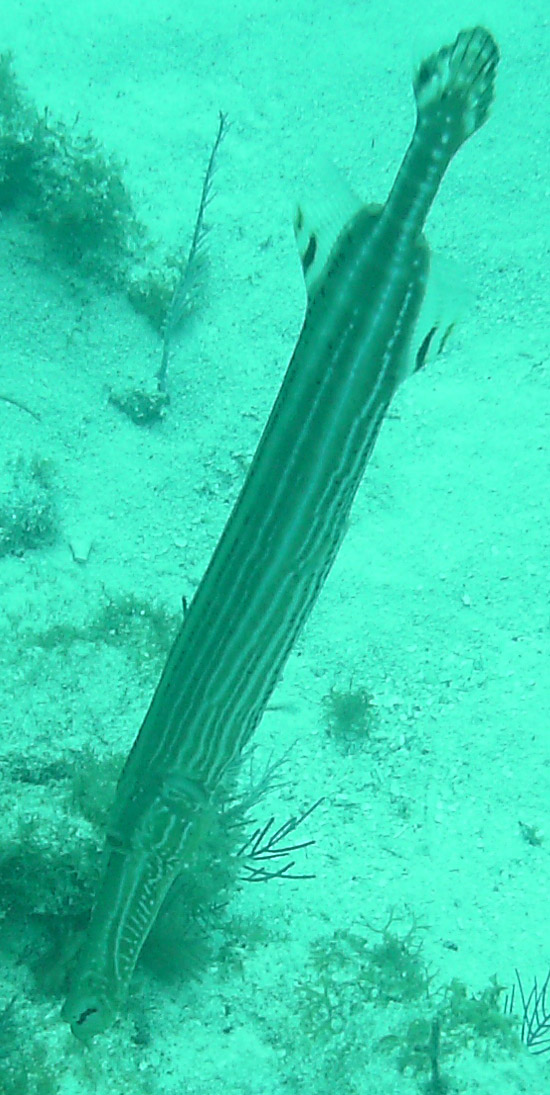
Trumpetfish at Molasses Reef, Florida Keys

== Human use ==
Aulostomus maculatus is a minor part of the aquarium trade. It is often caught in seines and traps by fisheries, to which it is of minor commercial interest.

== Conservation ==
The global decline of coral reefs and seagrass beds, and especially those occurring in the Caribbean is a threat to this species, as is predation by invasive lionfish, Pterois volitans and P. miles which prey on smaller specimens. There are no species-specific conservation measures, but its distribution overlaps a number of marine protected areas. Despite the declines in coral reef and seagrass beds habitats this species is resilient and is able to use other habitats such as rocky reefs which combined with its wide geographic range mean that it is assessed as Least Concern by the IUCN.
