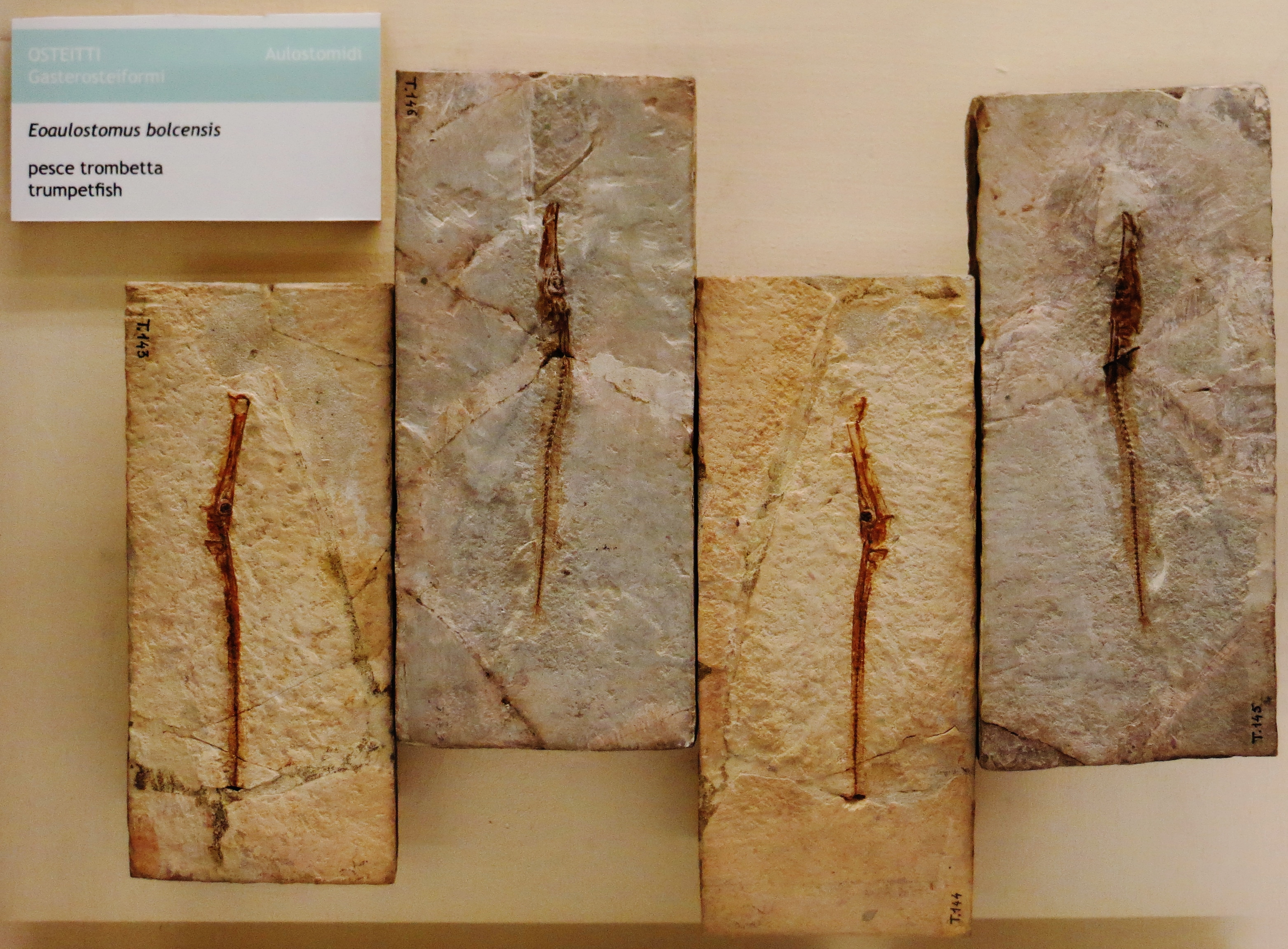
- Specimens of E. bolcensis, Museo di Storia Naturale

Scientific classification
- Kingdom: Animalia
- Phylum: Chordata
- Class: Actinopterygii
- Order: Syngnathiformes
- Family: Aulostomidae
- Genus: †Eoaulostomus; Blot, 1981

Type species
- †Fistularia bolcensis de Blainville, 1818

Species
- †E. bolcensis (de Blainville, 1818); †E. gracilis Blot, 1981

= Eoaulostomus =

Eoaulostomus Temporal range: Early Eocene

Extinct genus of fishes

Eoaulostomus ("dawn Aulostomus") is an extinct genus of marine ray-finned fish, closely related to the modern trumpetfish, that lived during the Eocene. It contains two species, E. bolcensis (de Blainville, 1818) and E. gracilis (Blot, 1981), both known from the Early Eocene-aged Monte Bolca site of Italy.

The type species, E. bolcensis, was initially described in error by Volta as a fossil specimen of the Chinese trumpetfish (Aulostomus chinensis) before being moved to its own species within Fistularia (thought to be synonymous with Aulostomus at the time) by de Blainville. It was later reclassified into Aulostomus and remained there for over a century until reclassification into its own genus, with the description of a new species.
