= Tenejapa-Lacandón Formation =

Geological formation in Mexico

- Stratigraphic range: Danian, 63 Ma
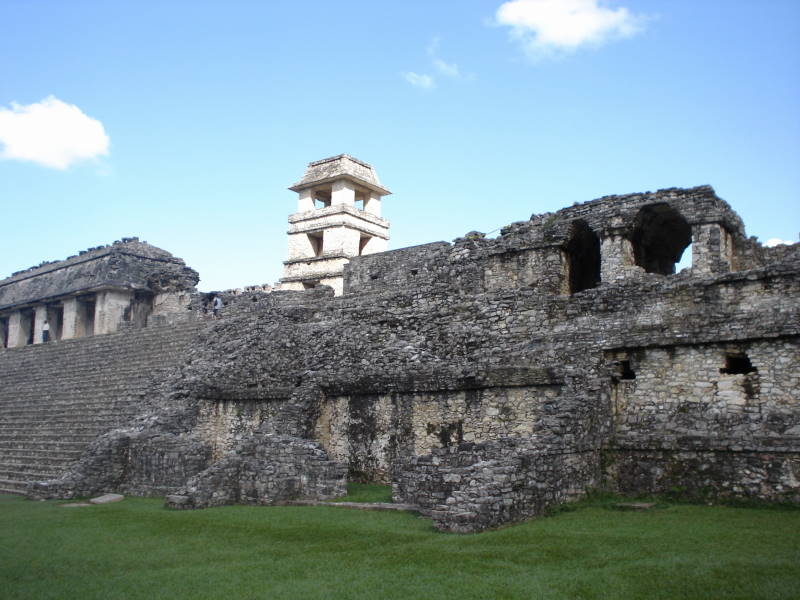
- The city of Palenque was built with stone from the Tenejapa-Lacandón Formation
- Type: Unit or geological formation
- Sub-units: Tenejapa Formation, Lacandón Formation

Lithology
- Primary: Limestone
- Other: Marl, breccia

Location
- Region: Chiapas, Petén
- Country: Mexico; Guatemala

Type section
- Named for: Tenejapa Municipality, Lacandon Jungle
- Named by: Vinson, 1962 (Lacandón) Quezada-Muñetón, 1987 (Tenejapa) Alvarado-Ortega, 2015 (as a combined unit)

The Tenejapa-Lacandón Formation is a geological formation and lagerstätte in southern Mexico and western Guatemala. It preserves fossils dating to the Early Paleocene.

It is located primarily in the Mexican state of Chiapas, but outcrops lie as far west as Petén, Guatemala. Some consider it as two distinct formations, the Tenejapa Formation to the west and the Lacandón Formation to the east, which are contiguous and contemporary with each other. The Lacandón Formation was deposited in a shallow inshore marine habitat, whereas the Tenejapa Formation was deposited in a deep offshore habitat. They appear to preserve a marine ecosystem deposited on the western margin of the Caribbean Sea.

The most prominent exposures are at the División del Norte and Belisario Domínguez quarries near Palenque, Chiapas, which contain articulated fish skeletons belonging to a variety of taxa of both Cenozoic and Mesozoic affinities. This formation was also the source of the limestone used to build the ancient Mayan city of Palenque, with one other fossil-bearing locality being an unnamed quarry used by the Mayans. The inhabitants of ancient Palenque were aware of the fossils present in the formation, and used them in ways such as painting articulated fossils for the purpose of decoration.

The Tenejapa-Lacandón Formation is, temporally and geographically, the "closest" geological formation to the Chicxulub impact crater; it is located only 500 kilometres (310 mi) from the Chicxulub crater and was deposited approximately 3 million years after the impact. For this reason, it is important evidence for understanding the recovery of ocean ecosystems in the wake of the Cretaceous-Paleogene extinction event, especially near the Chicxulub crater. The high number of well-preserved fossil fish specimens, likely relating to mass mortality events, makes it a lagerstätte. It represents one of the richest known faunas of articulated Paleocene acanthomorphs.

== Paleofauna ==
Color key
Taxon	Reclassified taxon	Taxon falsely reported as present	Dubious taxon or junior synonym	Ichnotaxon	Ootaxon	Morphotaxon

Notes
Uncertain or tentative taxa are in small text; ~~crossed out~~ taxa are discredited.

=== Fishes ===
Genus	Species	Location	Stratigraphic position	Material	Notes	Images
Anguilliformes	incertae sedis	Belisario Domínguez		Multiple complete specimens	An eel.	
Chaychanus	C. gonzalezorum	Belisario Domínguez		Complete specimen	An early damselfish.	
Chanos	C. chautus				A relative of the milkfish.	
Clupeidae	incertae sedis	División del Norte		Complete specimen	A herring relative.	
Eekaulostomus	E. cuevasae	Belisario Domínguez		Complete specimen	An armored relative of the trumpetfish.	
?Erythrinidae	incertae sedis				A potential trahira.	
Gonorhynchidae	incertae sedis				A relative of the beaked salmon.	
Kelemejtubus	K. castroi	Belisario Domínguez & División del Norte		Multiple complete specimens	An indeterminate percomorph.	
Paleoserranus	P. lakamhae	Belisario Domínguez & División del Norte		Multiple complete specimens	A serranid.	
?Phareodus	P. sp.	División del Norte		Complete specimen	An osteoglossid. Assignment disputed.	
Pycnodus	P. sp.	Belisario Domínguez		Multiple complete specimens	A pycnodontid.	

=== Reptiles ===
Genus	Species	Location	Stratigraphic position	Material	Notes	Images
Testudines	incertae sedis				A turtle.	
