= Aulostomus medius =

Aulostomus medius Temporal range: Early Oligocene

Scientific classification
- Kingdom: Animalia
- Phylum: Chordata
- Class: Actinopterygii
- Order: Syngnathiformes
- Family: Aulostomidae
- Genus: Aulostomus
- Species: †A. medius

Binomial name
- †Aulostomus medius Weiler, 1920

Aulostomus medius is an extinct species of prehistoric trumpetfish known from the Early Oligocene of western Europe, which was covered by the Paratethys at the time. Fossil specimens are known from the Frauenweiler clay pit of Germany and the Froidefontaine Formation of France. In the former locality, it is known to have coexisted with the related aulostomid †Frauenweilerostomus.

It is known from well-preserved specimens, showing that its body was covered in rows of rectangular, evenly-sized scales ordered in rows.
