= Jungersenichthys =

Jungersenichthys Temporal range: Early to Middle Eocene

Scientific classification
- Kingdom: Animalia
- Phylum: Chordata
- Class: Actinopterygii
- Division: Teleostei
- Order: Syngnathiformes
- Family: Aulostomidae
- Genus: †Jungersenichthys; Blot, 1981
- Species: †J. elongatus

Binomial name
- †Jungersenichthys elongatus Blot, 1981

Extinct genus of fishes

Jungersenichthys is an extinct genus of prehistoric marine syngnathiform fish, related to modern trumpetfish, that lived from the early to the middle Eocene of Europe. A single described species is known, J. elongatus from the Early Eocene-aged Monte Bolca site of Italy. An indeterminate species is known from the middle Eocene (Bartonian)-aged upper Kuma Formation of the North Caucasus, Russia.
