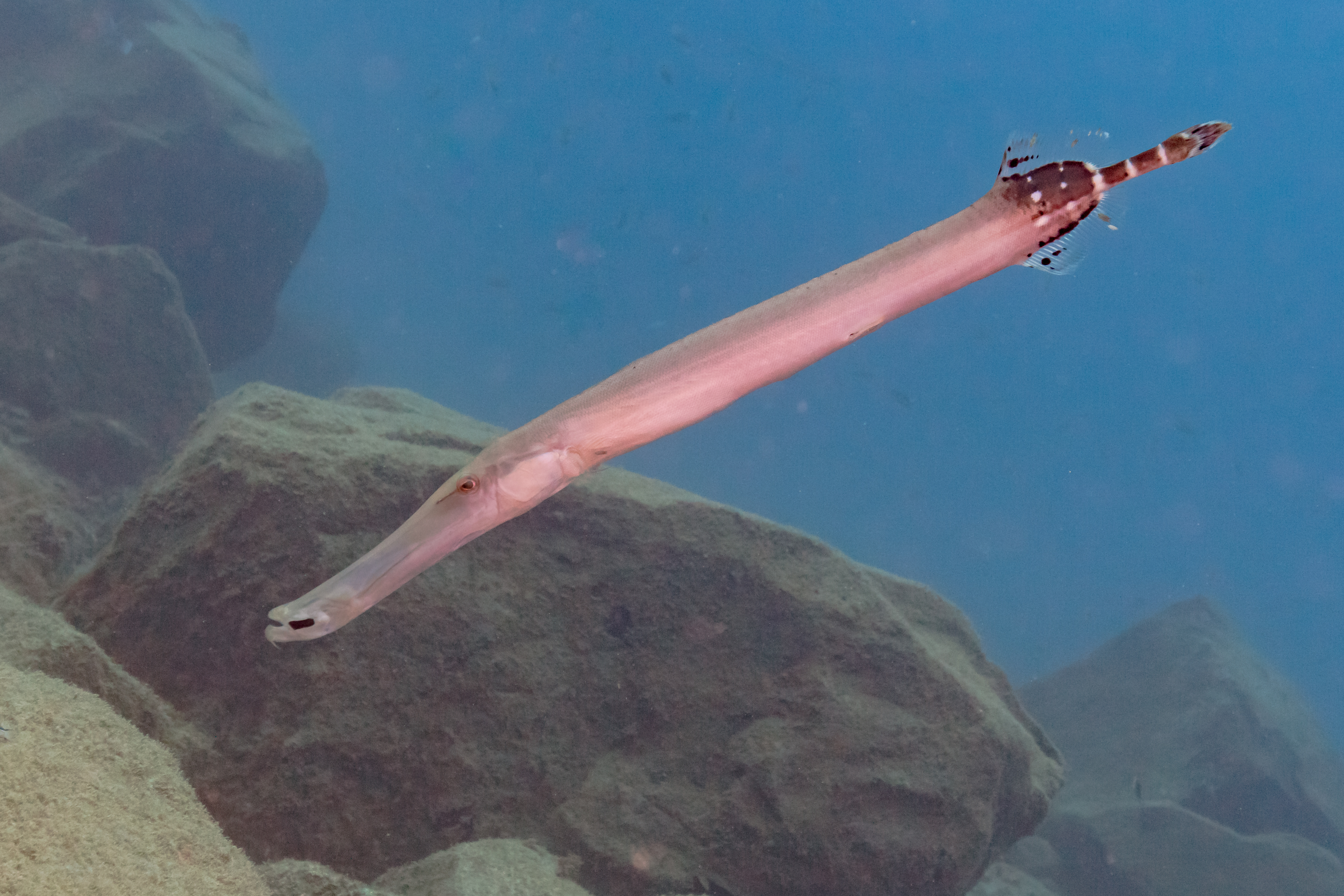
- Atlantic trumpetfish on Tenerife (Spain)

Conservation status
- Least Concern (IUCN 3.1)

Scientific classification
- Kingdom: Animalia
- Phylum: Chordata
- Class: Actinopterygii
- Order: Syngnathiformes
- Family: Aulostomidae
- Genus: Aulostomus
- Species: A. strigosus

Binomial name
- Aulostomus strigosus Wheeler, 1955

= Atlantic trumpetfish =

Species of fish

The Atlantic trumpetfish (Aulostomus strigosus), also referred to as Atlantic coronetfish, is a species of trumpetfish in the family Aulostomidae. It is a tropical marine fish found in shallow coastal waters in the eastern Atlantic Ocean from Mauritania to Namibia. Like other trumpetfish, they eat mainly small fish and often shadow other piscivores while hunting.

Aulostomus strigosus was found to be very closely related to A. maculatus, strongly supporting the theory that A. strigosus traversed the Atlantic to come to inhabit the Southeast Pacific.

== Species description ==
Trumpetfish are long bodied fish with an upward facing mouth at the end of a long tubular snout.

It has the ability to change colour, either to communicate their excitement or to camouflage them. The most frequent colours recorded are brown or even blue, green or orange tones, or intermediate shades. It can display a pattern of pale, vertical and/or horizontal lines, or a dark mottling on the body. The dorsal and anal fins are semitransparent with a black dot in front of it. Typically it has a pattern of four white spots on the body, between the dorsal and anal fins; three white vertical lines in the long caudal peduncle and a black, submarginal, in each margin of the caudal fin dot.

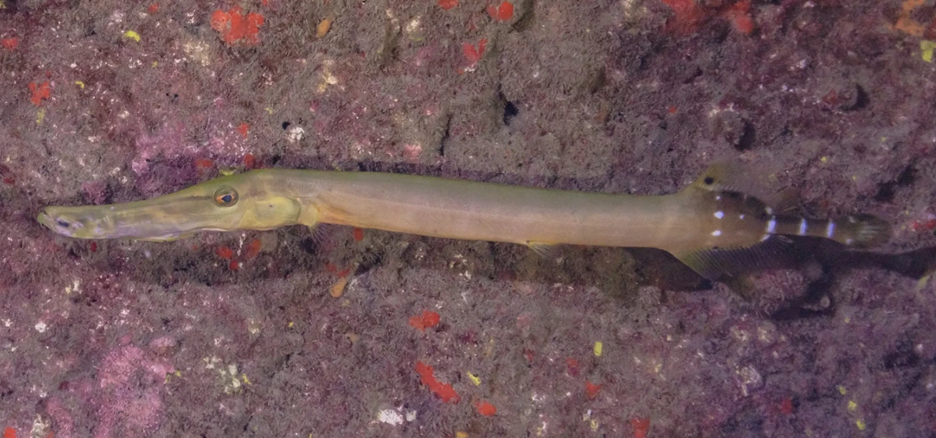
Full body picture of Aulostomus strigosus

The diversity in trumpetfish colors are due to chromatophores, which are cells that often contain pigment. The blue tones can be attributed to melanophores, which contain a type of melanin called eumelanin that generally absorbs light. The heads of blue fish contain iridophores, particles that reflect light, which are less prevalent in the other colors of fish. The combination of absorptive melanin and reflective iridophores create this unique coloration. Other combinations of light reactive pigments such as erythrophores, and xanthophores create different patterns on mottled trumpetfish.

The Atlantic trumpetfish could be confused with the west Atlantic trumpetfish, due to the similarity in morphology and range. However, no silvery streaked species as are common with A. maculatus have been recorded in A. strigosus.

It reaches a maximum length of 75 cm.

== Taxonomic Explanation ==
There are three recognized species of trumpetfish: Aulostomus strigosus, A. maculatus, and A. chinensis. A. strigosus was found to be more closely related to the Indian-Pacific version of the trumeptfish (A. chinensis) than the west Atlantic trumpetfish (A. maculatus), despite the geographical similarity between the two species. There are multiple theories about how this development occurred. The most promising idea states that 1) Atlantic and Indian-Pacific forms were isolated through recent evolutionary history, giving rise to A. maculatus and A. chinensis and (2) The Indian-Pacific form subsequently invaded the East Atlantic, giving rise to A. strigosus. A. maculatus likely came into existence through the migration of A. chinensis 3-4 million years ago through the Cape of Good Hope, which was a common passageway for Indian Ocean biota in the South Atlantic. The A. strigosus/A. chinensis split was possibly caused by a cold water upwelling in South Africa 2.5 million years ago, causing allopatric speciation in the Eastern Atlantic to occur.

There are three haplotype variations of A. strigosus. One of these haplotypes is complexly unique to the Mid-Atlantic Ridge (Acsension and St. Helena Islands). Compared to other trumpetfish species, A. strigosus has a high population structure, and lots of diversity within their population.

It is unlikely that A. strigosus and A. maculatus ever interact or crossbreed, as their ranges and ideal habiats are 1200 miles apart. Additionally, A. strigosus lives in slightly closer waters than A. maculatus is used to.

== Biology ==
The Atlantic trumpetfish is oviparous with pelagic eggs. The spawning season for Aulostomus strigosus is set in between the months of March and June. It is possible that male members of A. strigosus use a brood pouch to fertilize eggs, as this behavior has been observed in other fish of the order Syngnathiformes. Unfortunately, not much is known about the reproductive process of the Atlantic trumpetfish. Atlantic trumpetfish increase in size as they increase in age. Older specimens also have a larger number of scales, lateral striae, and terminal spines. However, Atlantic trumpetfish do not mark years in their scales, as many other pelagic fish do.

== Diet and Hunting Methods ==
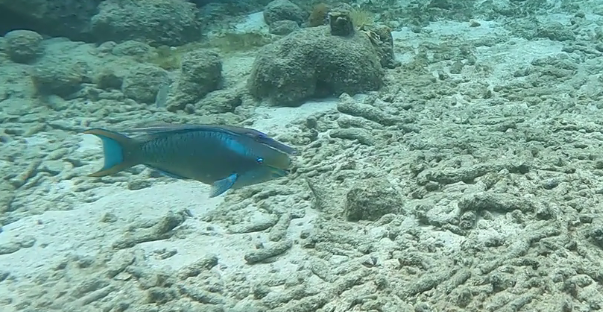
Video of trumpetfish practicing "shadowing" hunting behavior

Its main prey is bony fish and shrimp but it is also thought to feed on other animals found on the substrate. Its elongated snout can be used to search tighter holes within rocks in search of prey. A. strigosus is also considered a "follower" fish in that it will swim with schools of other species of fish, especially large, herbivorous fishes, for both protection and to exploit foraging opportunities. This habit has been well demonstrated in closely related species A. maculatus. The parrotfish is a common herbivore these fish will align their bodies against. It has been well documented that prey species take longer to show avoidance behavior when the trumpetfish are shadowing than when swimming independently, demonstrating the effectiveness of this predation strategy. While they perform this behavior, trumpetfish will often match up with other fish species that are similar to their own coloration in order to blend in more effectively. Adaptationally, this pattern is especially useful in locations with degraded reefs since there are fewer stationary objects for the trumpetfish to hide behind. As reefs continue to degrade, due to climate change, this adaption will further aid in hunting for the trumpetfish. When hunting smaller prey trumpetfish will hang vertically in the water column, head pointed downwards, striking at prey when the opportunity arises. They will also attempt to blend in with other elongated objects, like gorgonians or ropes, to ambush prey. A. strigosus are frequent prey of ospreys in Cape Verde and possibly elsewhere within their range.

== Other Behaviors ==
The Atlantic trumpetfish swims using the undulation of its median and pectoral fins. Aulostomus strigosus has been known to form swarms and is mainly active at night. Like many fish, trumpetfishes have an elaborate courtship display, in which they employ their colour-changing abilities, so often used for camouflage. These dances are similar to those of seahorses, as they share the same order, Syngnathiformes. A. strigosus are also a potentially vocal species, as they are in the same family as a species that has been recorded as vocal.

== Distribution ==
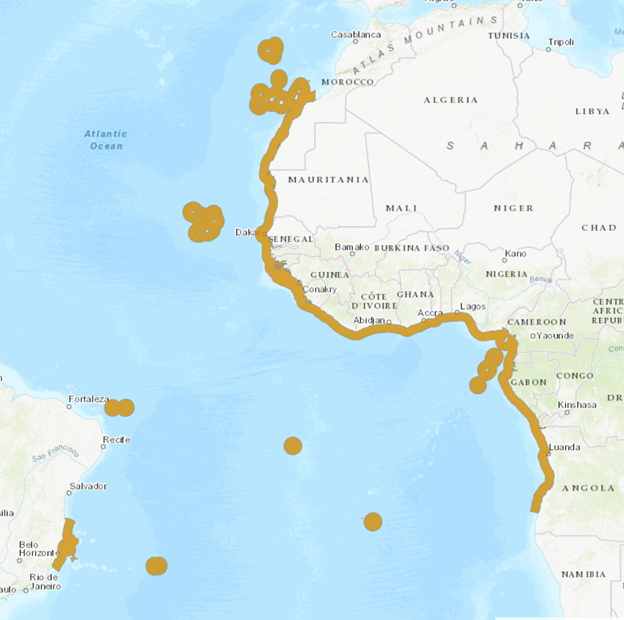
Map of the range of A. strigosus

Aulostomus strigosus is a demersal, coastal species that is found over rocky or coral substrates in inshore waters. The Mid-Atlantic barrier separates the Atlantic trumpetfish, who calls the Eastern Atlantic home, from the west Atlantic trumpetfish. The Atlantic trumpetfish inhabits a large range. The Atlantic trumpetfish is found in the warmer waters of the eastern Atlantic from Namibia to Mauritania, it is also found in the Macaronesian Islands including Madeira, Cape Verde Islands and the Canary Islands. The species has also been recorded in Brazil in Espírito Santo and St. Paul's rocks. While originally it was thought that fish in this area was A. maculatus, due to their similarity in morphology, it has since been discovered that the fish in this location are genetically identical to A. strigorus. A. strigosus lives at a minimum depth of 5 m and a maximum depth of 25 m.

There is very little information regarding the population dynamics of A. strigosus. There have been no focused surveys on this species to date. The Atlantic trumpetfish is considered to be relatively uncommon. However, it has a very strong population structure, contrary to other species of trumpetfish.

Out of all 106 amphi-Atlantic reeffish, A. strigosus is one of only four to have migrated from the east Atlantic to the west.

== Conservation status ==
The Atlantic trumpetfish has been listed as a species of Least Concern according to the ICUN Red List. The current population trend of the Atlantic trumpetfish is unknown, as well as whether mature individuals are in decline. It is also unknown whether the population is experiencing severe fragmentation. As with other reef fishes, the Atlantic trumpetfish is threatened by climate change, which could cause habitat shifting and alteration as well as temperature extremes to occur. The species is of no interest to commercial fisheries, and therefore is not threatened by their activities. Currently, there are no species-specific conservation efforts in place for the Atlantic trumpetfish. However, its range does overlap with marine preserves, which may contribute to the conservation of the species. To ensure the species remains unthreatened, population and habitat monitoring should be implemented. It is also likely that this species would benefit from international efforts to mitigate climate change.

== Gallery ==
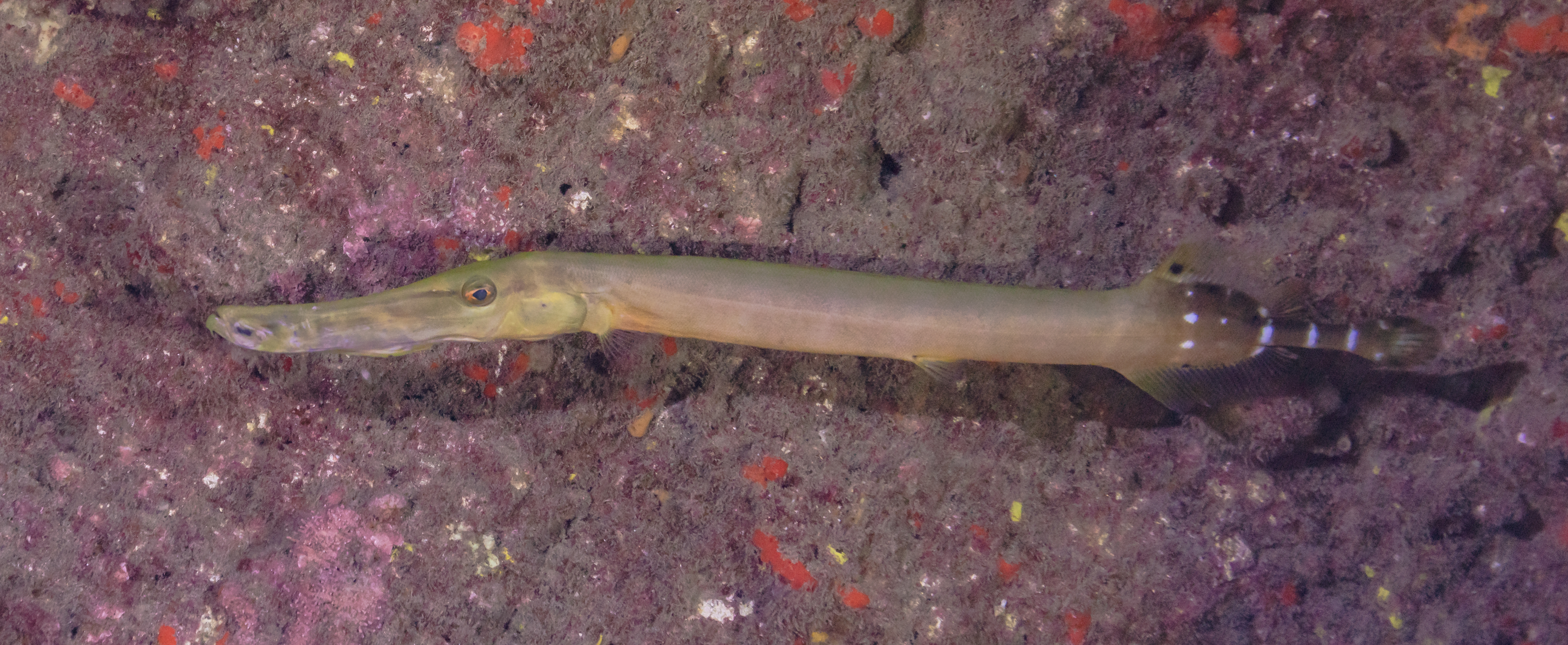
Aulostomus strigosus Tenerife, Canary Islands

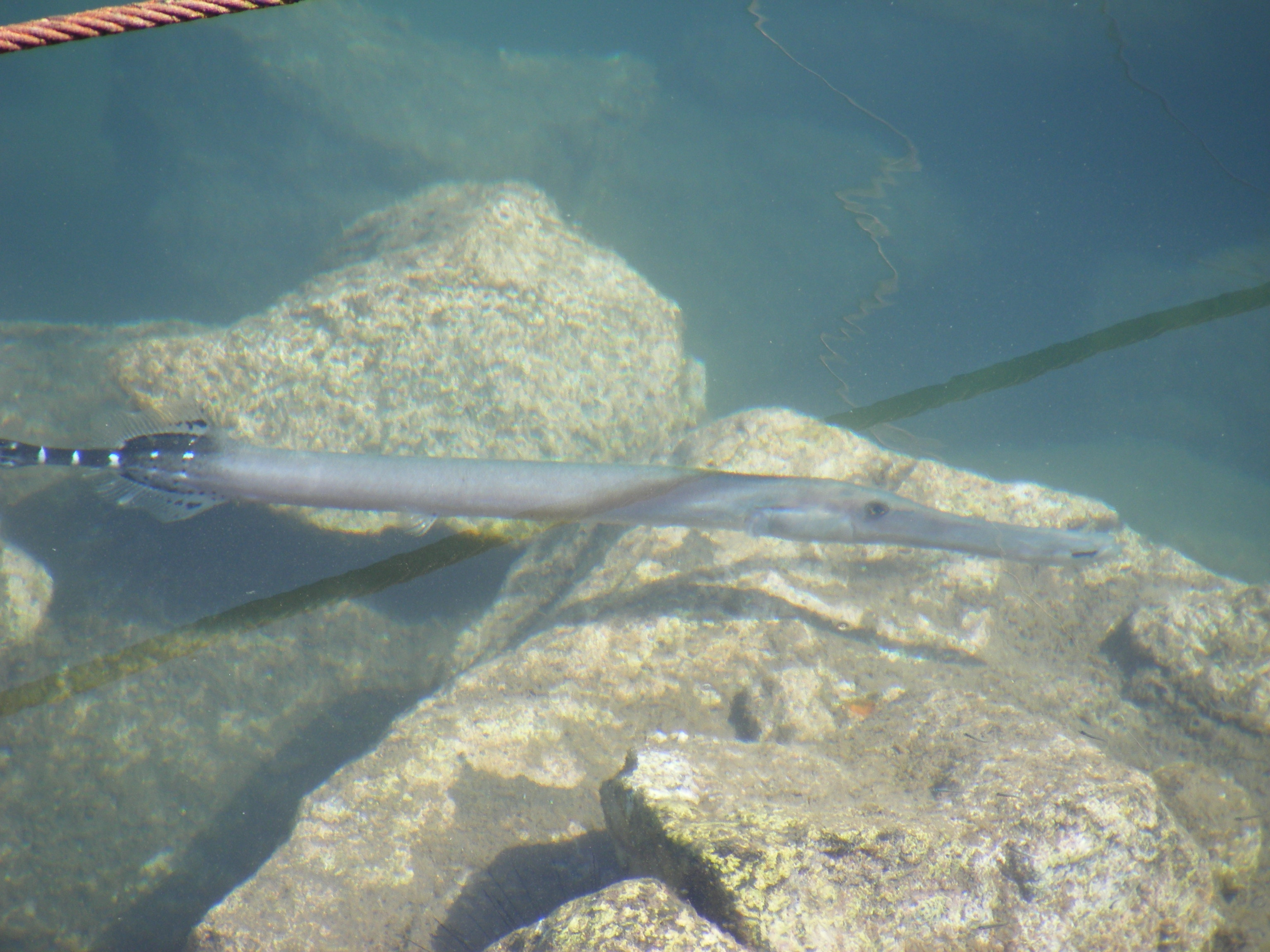
Atlantic trumpetfish in the Marina of San Sebastian de La Gomera, Canary Islands, Spain

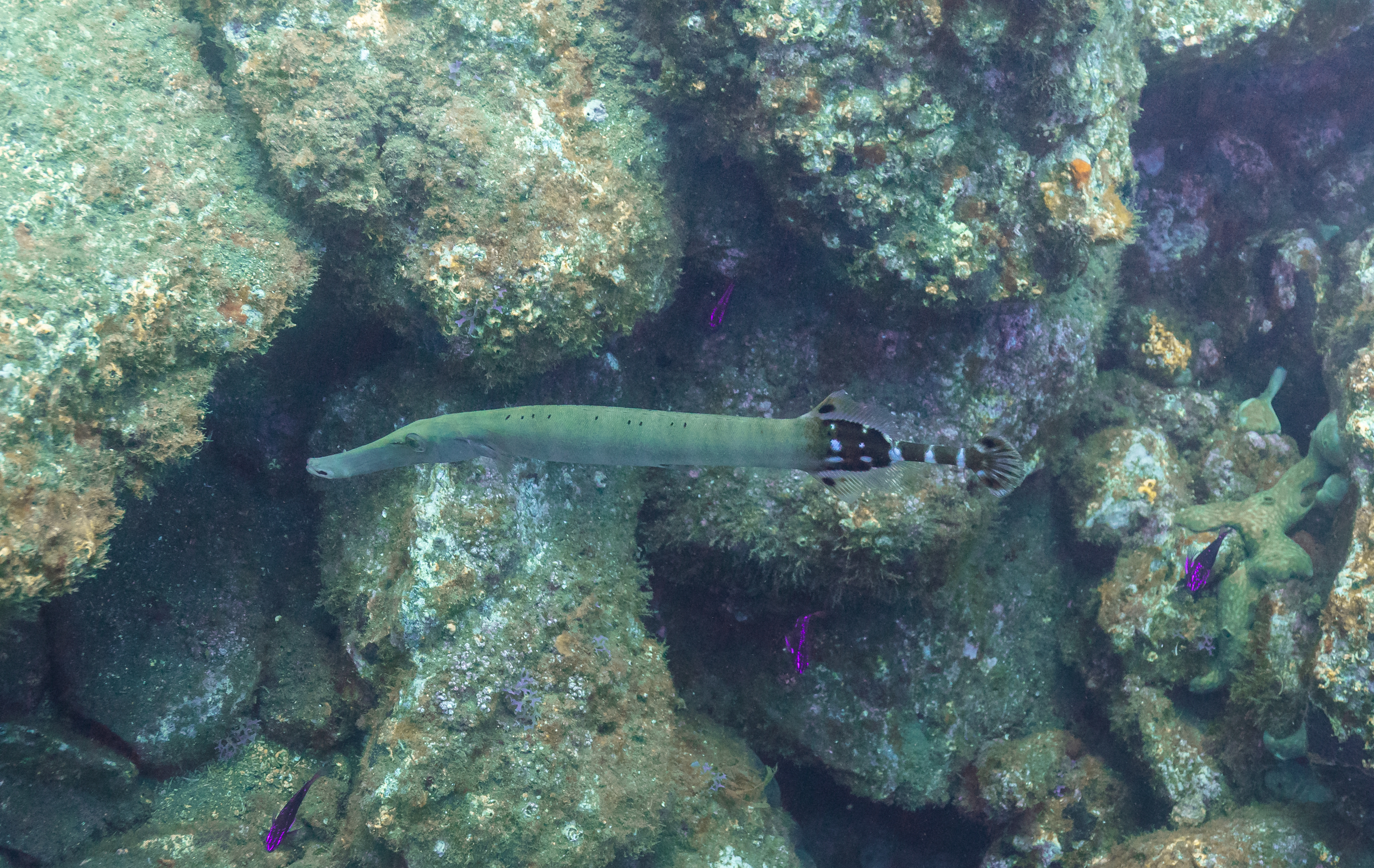
Atlantic trumpetfish on Madeira

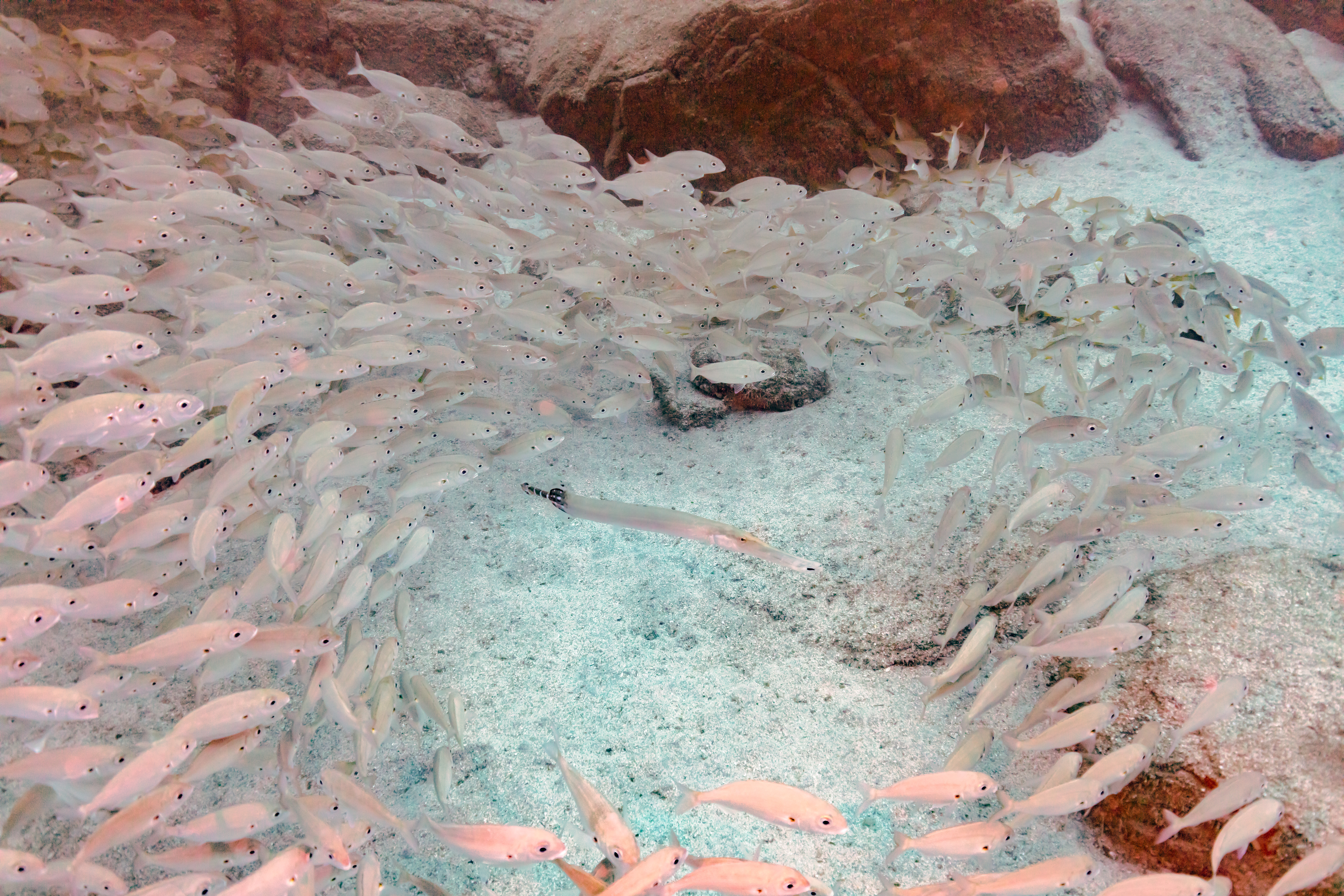
Atlantic trumpetfish within a school of grunts (Pomadasys incisus)

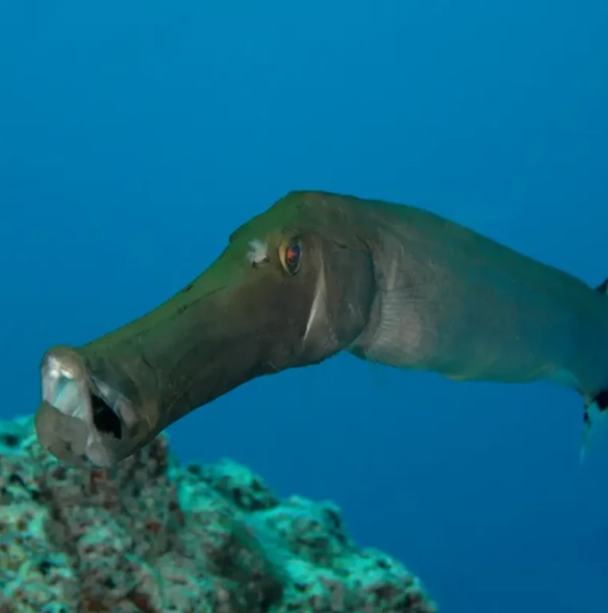
Close-up photo of trumpetfish head and mouth
