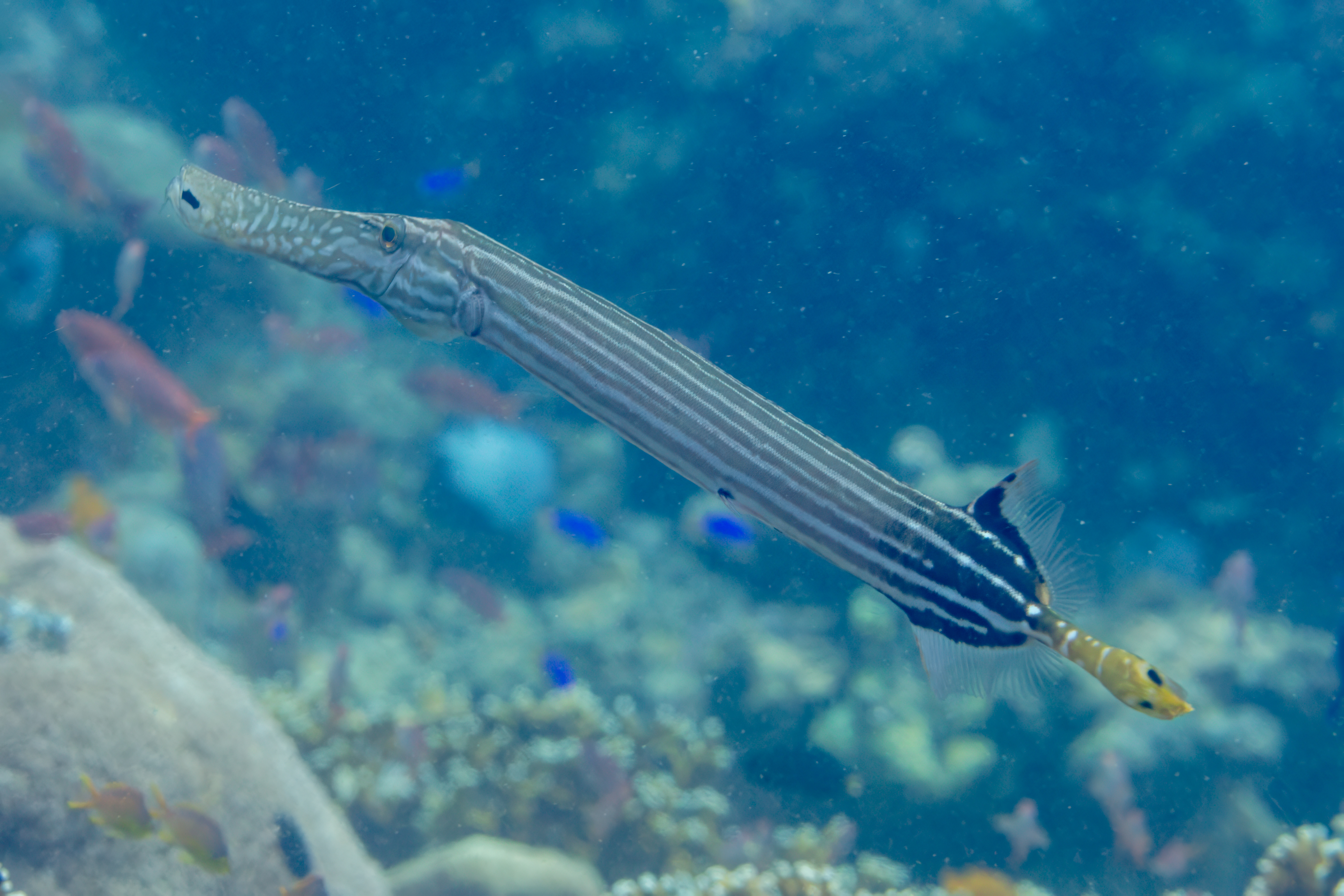

Conservation status
- Least Concern (IUCN 3.1)

Scientific classification
- Kingdom: Animalia
- Phylum: Chordata
- Class: Actinopterygii
- Division: Teleostei
- Order: Syngnathiformes
- Family: Aulostomidae
- Genus: Aulostomus
- Species: A. chinensis

Binomial name
- Aulostomus chinensis (Linnaeus, 1766)

Synonyms
- Fistularia chinensis Linnaeus, 1766; Polypterichthys valentini Bleeker, 1853; Aulostomus valentini (Bleeker, 1853)

= Chinese trumpetfish =

Species of fish

The Chinese trumpetfish (Aulostomus chinensis), is a demersal marine fish belonging to the family Aulostomidae.

== Description ==
Aulostomus chinensis is a medium-sized fish which grows up to 80 cm in length. Its body is elongated and compressed laterally, with a long, tubular snout which has a small barbel at its inferior extremity. The protrusible mouth can be extended forward to catch prey. On the top posterior part of the body, the dorsal fin is composed of two parts, the first anterior is a set of isolated spines and the second is a small ray fin. This latter fin is similar in shape to the anal fin which is just under. The pelvic fins are located in the middle of the body and are small, with one basal black spot.

The body coloration can be uniform or mottled in a range of grey, brown, or dark green. Some fish are uniformly bright yellow. The rear part of the body is normally black with white dots. Two black spots are present on the tail. The compound set of the long caudal peduncle and the caudal fin is yellowish, whatever the fish coloration. Caudal fin usually has two round black spots, at least one black spot occurs on the top and sometimes a second spot on the low part.

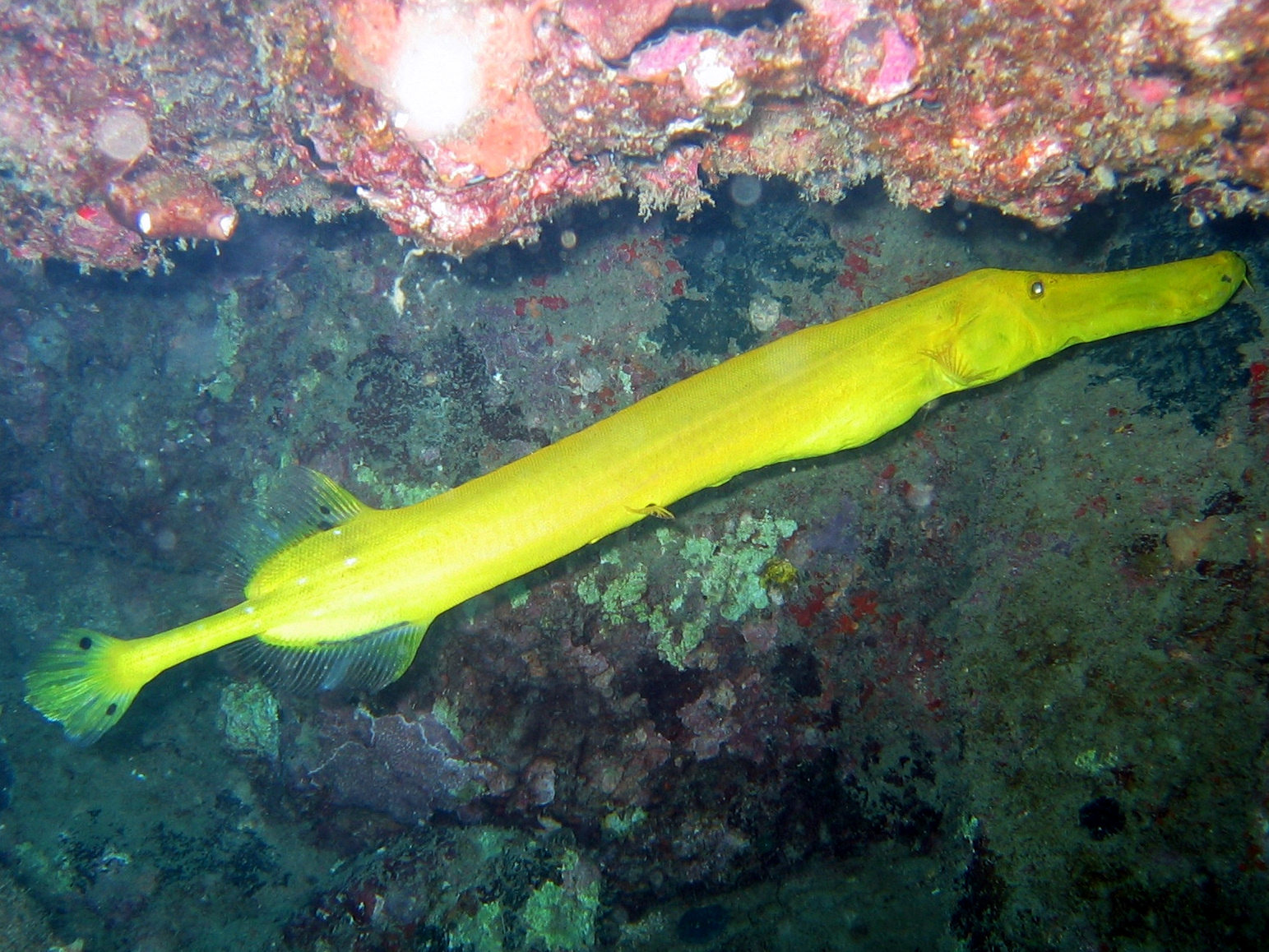
A yellow Chinese trumpetfish

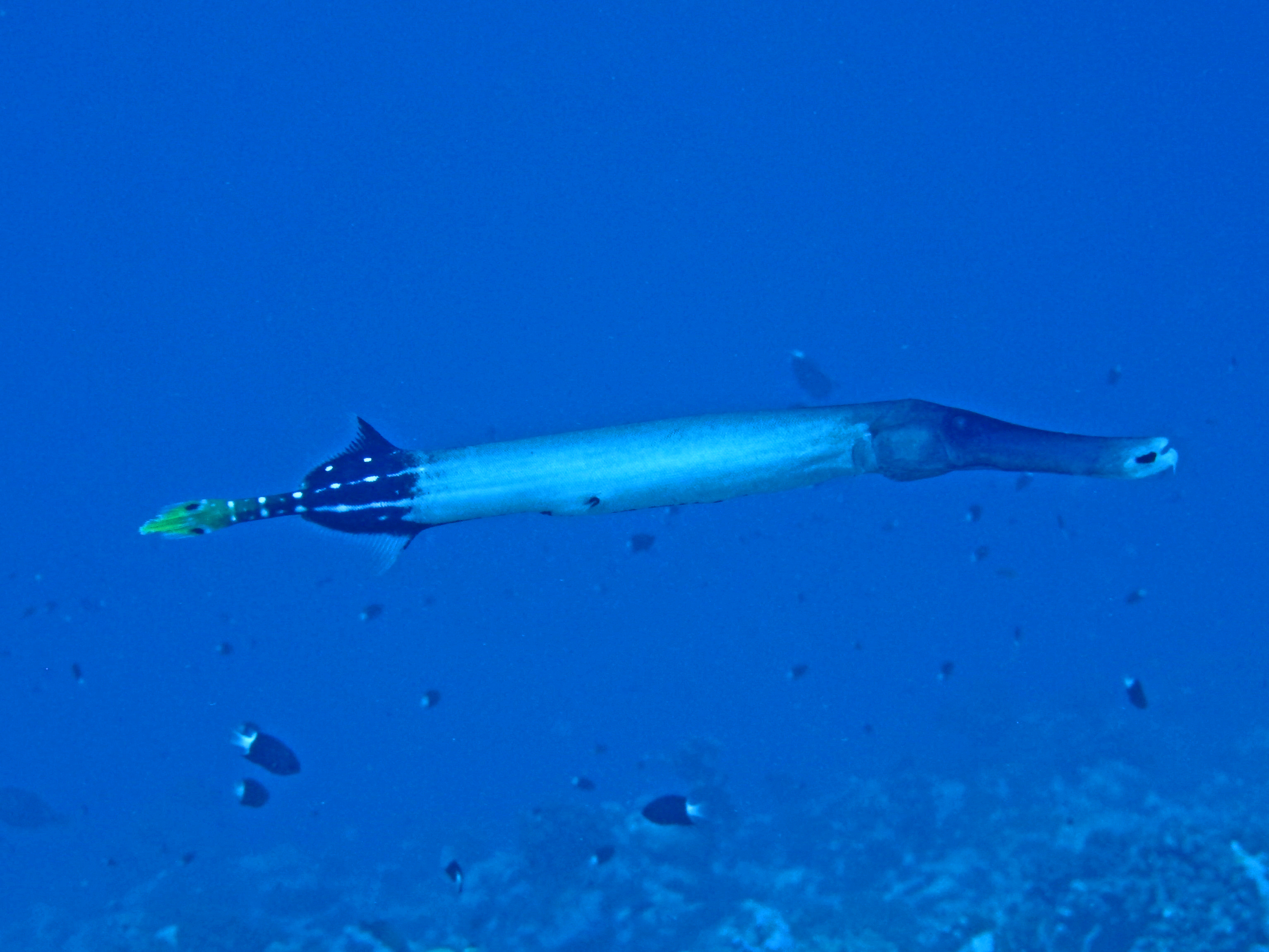
A. chinensis showing the black rear part of the body

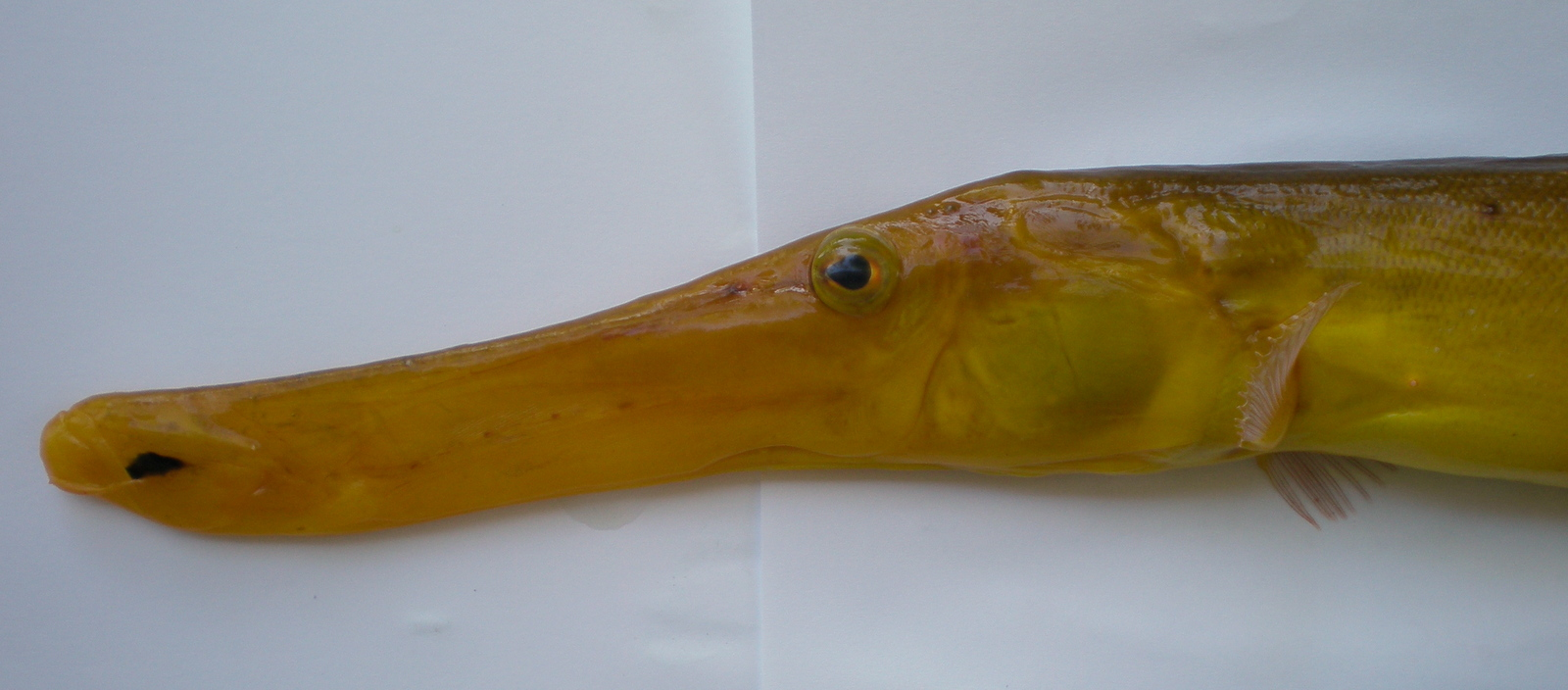
A. chinensis, detail of head

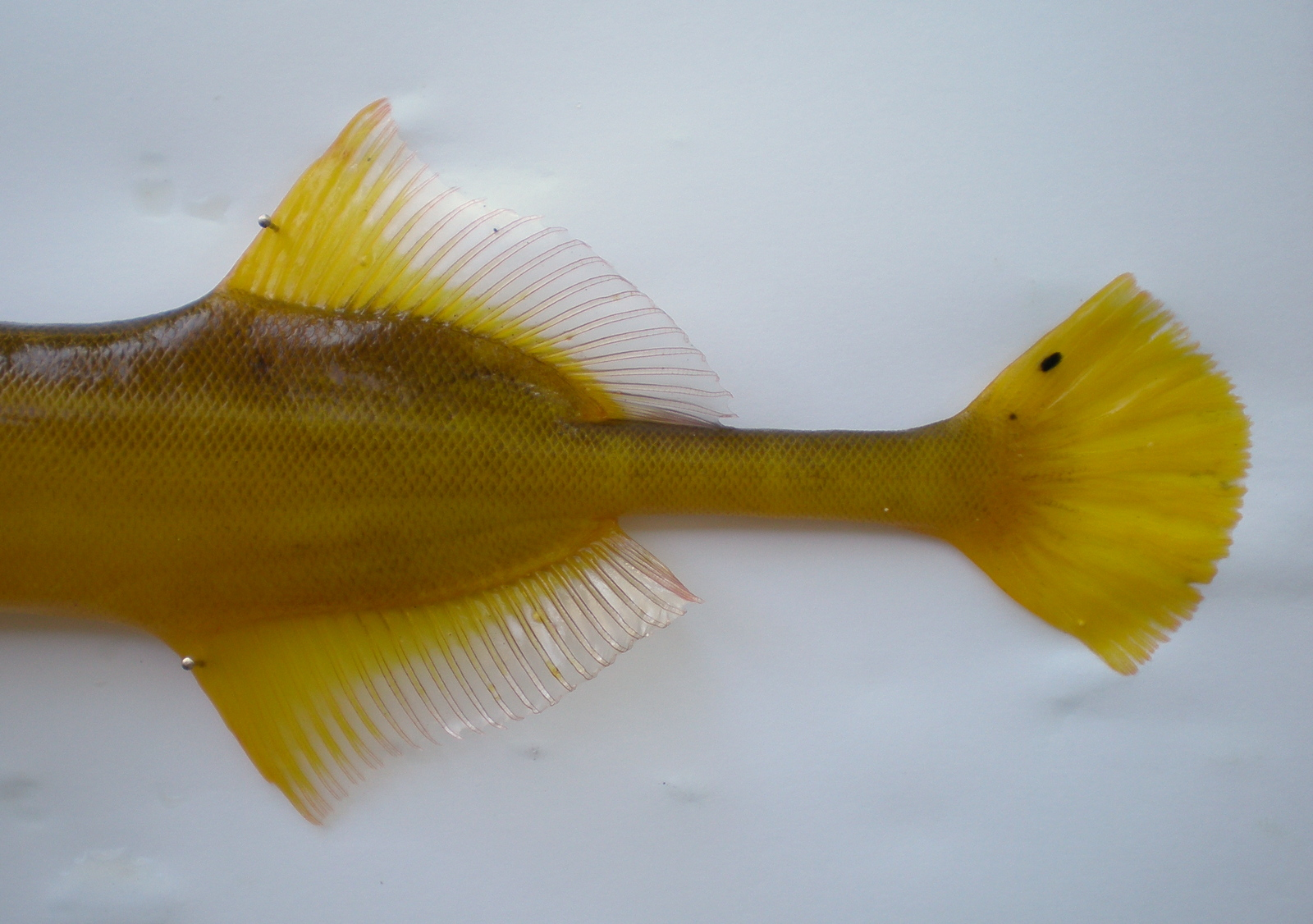
A. chinensis, detail of tail

== Distribution and habitat ==
This species is found in tropical and subtropical waters from the Indian Ocean and the Pacific Ocean, but not in the Red Sea. It lives in clear and calm waters in rocky and coral reefs from the surface to 120 m deep. Also seen around Bonaire.

== Behaviour ==
The Chinese trumpetfish is diurnal and solitary. It is a clever stealth hunter with two techniques to catch its prey. The first is the ambush, consisting of lying in wait for a potential prey close to hard coral, black coral bush, or gorgonian. The second is the discrete tracking, where the trumpetfish stays close to some big fishes (groupers, carangids) or even hawksbill sea turtles (Eretmochelys imbricata) until it has the opportunity to approach unsuspecting prey. The Chinese trumpetfish feeds on small fishes and crustaceans.
