= Gasterorhamphosus =

Gasterorhamphosus Temporal range: Campanian

Scientific classification
- Kingdom: Animalia
- Phylum: Chordata
- Class: Actinopterygii
- Division: Teleostei
- Order: Syngnathiformes
- Suborder: Syngnathoidei
- Genus: †Gasterorhamphosus; Sorbini, 1981
- Species: †G. zuppichini

Binomial name
- †Gasterorhamphosus zuppichini Sorbini, 1981

Extinct genus of ray-finned fishes

Gasterorhamphosus is an extinct genus of marine syngnathiform fish that lived during the Campanian stage of the Late Cretaceous. It contains a single species, G. zuppichini from the Calcari di Melissano formation of Italy.

It is the oldest known syngnathiform fish, making it distantly related to modern seahorses, pipefish, and trumpetfish. It shares an especially close similarity to modern snipefish, and has sometimes been placed in the same clade as them (the Centriscoidea). Others have found it to instead belong to the Aulostomoidea, containing trumpetfish and cornetfish. However, other analyses indicate that it likely occupies a more stemward position within the group. Despite this, studies have found it to at least group within the "long-snouted" clade of Syngnathiformes (the Syngnathoidei), making it the earliest known crown group-syngnathiform, and the oldest known definitive crown-group percomorph.
