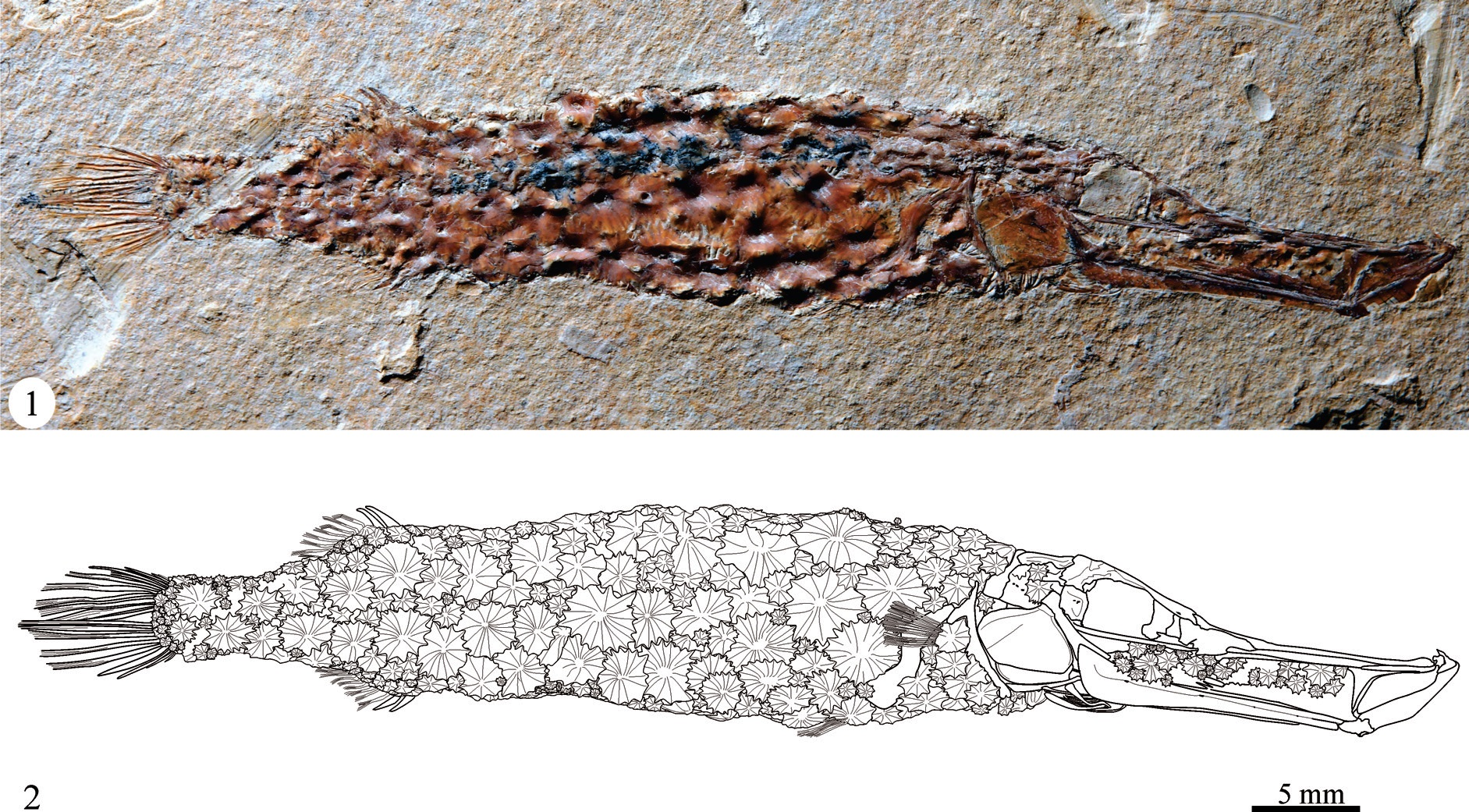
- Photograph and illustration of the type specimen

Scientific classification
- Kingdom: Animalia
- Phylum: Chordata
- Class: Actinopterygii
- Order: Syngnathiformes
- Suborder: Syngnathoidei
- Family: †Eekaulostomidae; Cantalice & Alvarado-Ortega, 2016
- Genus: †Eekaulostomus; Cantalice & Alvarado-Ortega, 2016
- Species: †E. cuevasae

Binomial name
- †Eekaulostomus cuevasae Cantalice & Alvarado-Ortega, 2016

= Eekaulostomus =

Eekaulostomus Temporal range: Early Paleocene, 63 Ma

Extinct genus of marine fish

Eekaulostomus is an extinct genus of marine fish from the Paleocene of Chiapas, Mexico. It contains one species, E. cuevasae, and is the only member of the family Eekaulostomidae.

Eekaulostomus was a syngnathiform, a member of the same order as modern trumpetfish, cornetfish, pipefish, and seahorses. It can be distinguished from other syngnathiforms by the prominent scutes covering its body, giving it an armored appearance. Its exact phylogenetic placement among the sygnanthiforms is debated, although it is known to belong to the "long-snouted" group (Syngnathoidei); it was initially recovered as allied with the trumpetfish superfamily (Aulostomoidea), but more recent studies have found it to be more closely related to the pipefish superfamily (Syngnathoidea).

The only known specimen of Eekaulostomus was found in exposures of the Tenejapa-Lacandón Unit in the Belisario Domínguez quarry near the ancient Mayan city of Palenque. It inhabited the Caribbean region in the Early Paleocene, just a few million years after the Cretaceous–Paleogene extinction event. The relative proximity of the locality to the Chicxulub crater indicates that marine ecosystems had likely recovered rapidly after the event, and that syngnathiformes are an ancient clade.

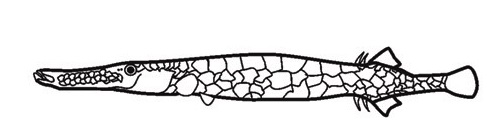
Life restoration

The genus name originates from eek, the Mayan word for star, and Aulostomus; this references its star-shaped scutes and close resemblance to the latter genus. The species name honors Mexican anthropologist Martha Cuevas García.
