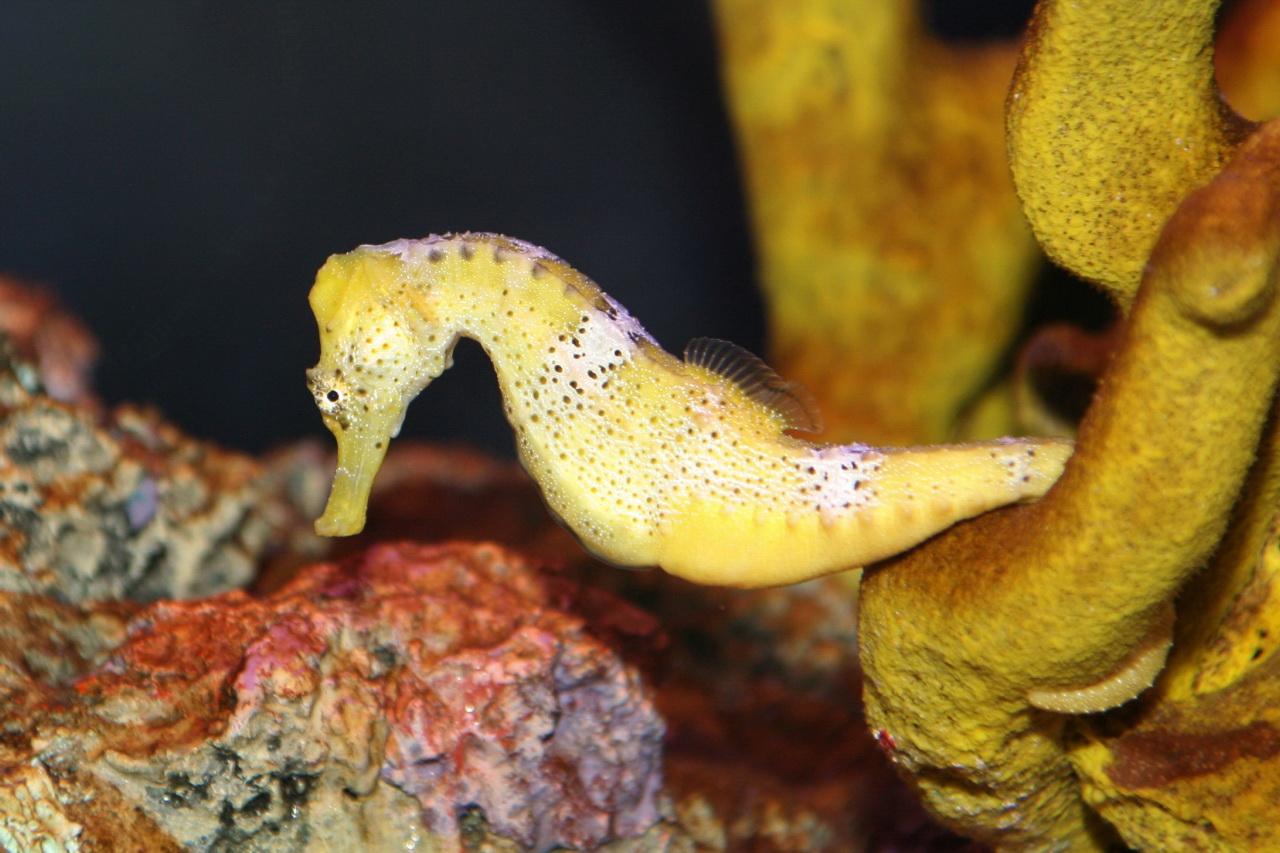
- Hippocampus reidi (Syngnathidae)
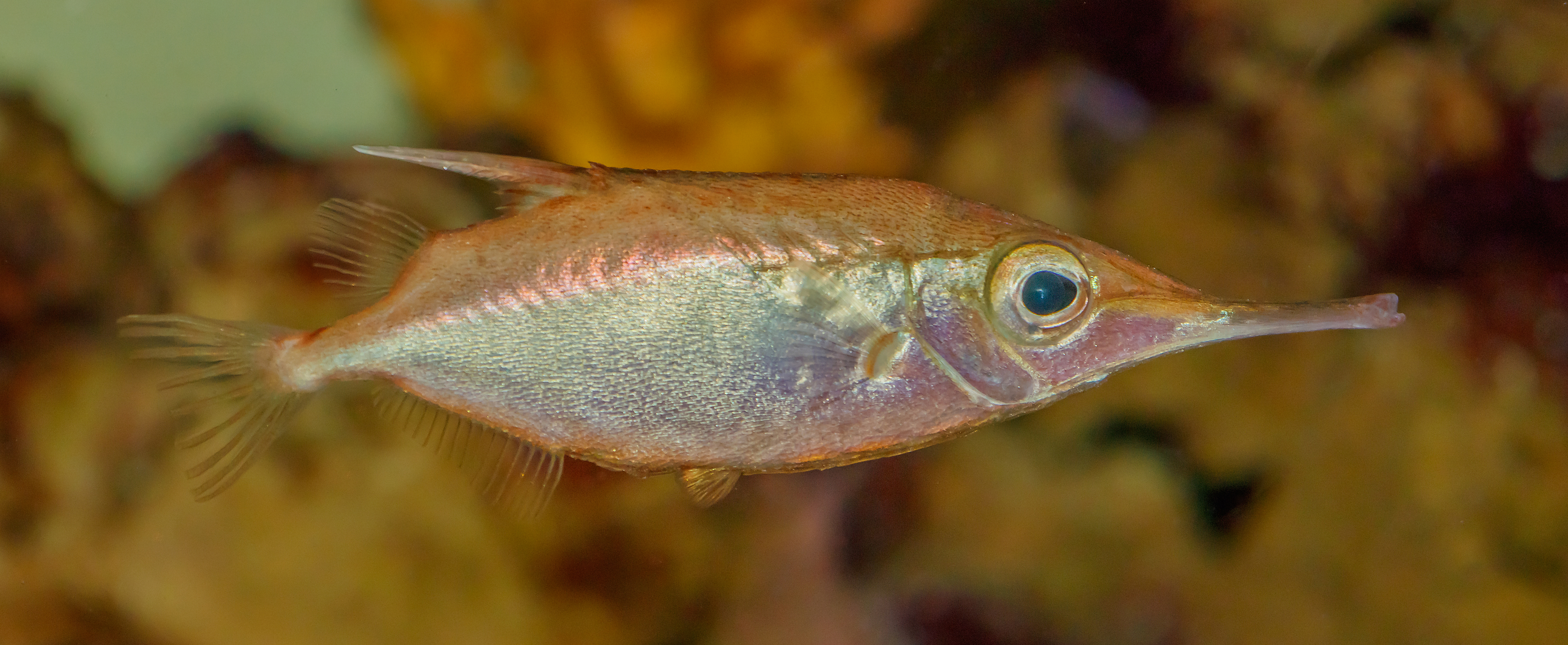
- Macroramphosus scolopax (Centriscidae)

Scientific classification
- Kingdom: Animalia
- Phylum: Chordata
- Class: Actinopterygii
- Division: Teleostei
- Order: Syngnathiformes
- Suborder: Syngnathoidei

Families
- Aulostomidae; Fistulariidae; Centriscidae; Solenostomidae; Syngnathidae

= Syngnathoidei =

Syngnathoidei Temporal range: Santonian–present

Suborder of fishes

Syngnathoidei is a large, diverse suborder of syngnathiform fish. It contains the "long-snouted" members of the order, and its monophyly has been affirmed by phylogenetic studies. The order contains pipefish, seahorses, trumpetfish, cornetfish, shrimpfish, and snipefish. They are found in tropical, subtropical and temperate seas, especially in coastal waters around rock and coral reefs and among sea weed and sea grass beds. However, there are also pelagic species of pipefish and even freshwater species.

This appears to be an ancient suborder, with fossil remains known as early as the Late Cretaceous period.

== Taxonomy ==
The suborder is classified as follows, with familial divisions based on Eschmeyer's Catalog of Fishes:

- Suborder Syngnathoidei
  - Superfamily Aulostomoidea
    - Family Aulostomidae Rafinesque, 1815 (trumpetfishes)
    - Family Fistularidae Blainville, 1818 (cornetfishes)
  - Superfamily Centriscoidea
    - Family Centriscidae Bonaparte, 1831 (shrimpfishes and snipefishes)
  - Superfamily Syngnathoidea
    - Family Solenostomidae Lacépède, 1803 (ghost pipefishes)
    - Family Syngnathidae Rafinesque, 1810 (pipefishes and seahorses)

=== Fossil taxa ===
The following fossil taxa are placed in this order:

- Suborder Syngnathoidei
  - Genus †Gasterorhamphosus Sorbini, 1981 - Late Cretaceous of Italy (potentially an aulostomoid)
  - Family †Eekaulostomidae Cantalice & Alvarado-Ortega, 2016 - Early Paleocene of Mexico (potentially an aulostomoid)
  - Superfamily Aulostomoidea
    - Genus †Aulostomoides Blot, 1980
    - Family †Fistularioididae Blot, 1981 - Early Eocene of Italy (likely synonymous with Fistulariidae)
    - Family †Parasynarcualidae Blot, 1981 (likely synonymous with Fistulariidae)
    - Family †Urosphenidae Gill, 1884 - Early Eocene of Italy
  - Superfamily Centriscoidea
    - Family †Gerpegezhidae Bannikov & Carnevale, 2012 - Early Eocene of North Caucasus, Russia
  - Superfamily Syngnathoidea
    - Family †Protosyngnathidae Boulenger, 1902 - Early-mid Eocene of Sumatra, Indonesia
