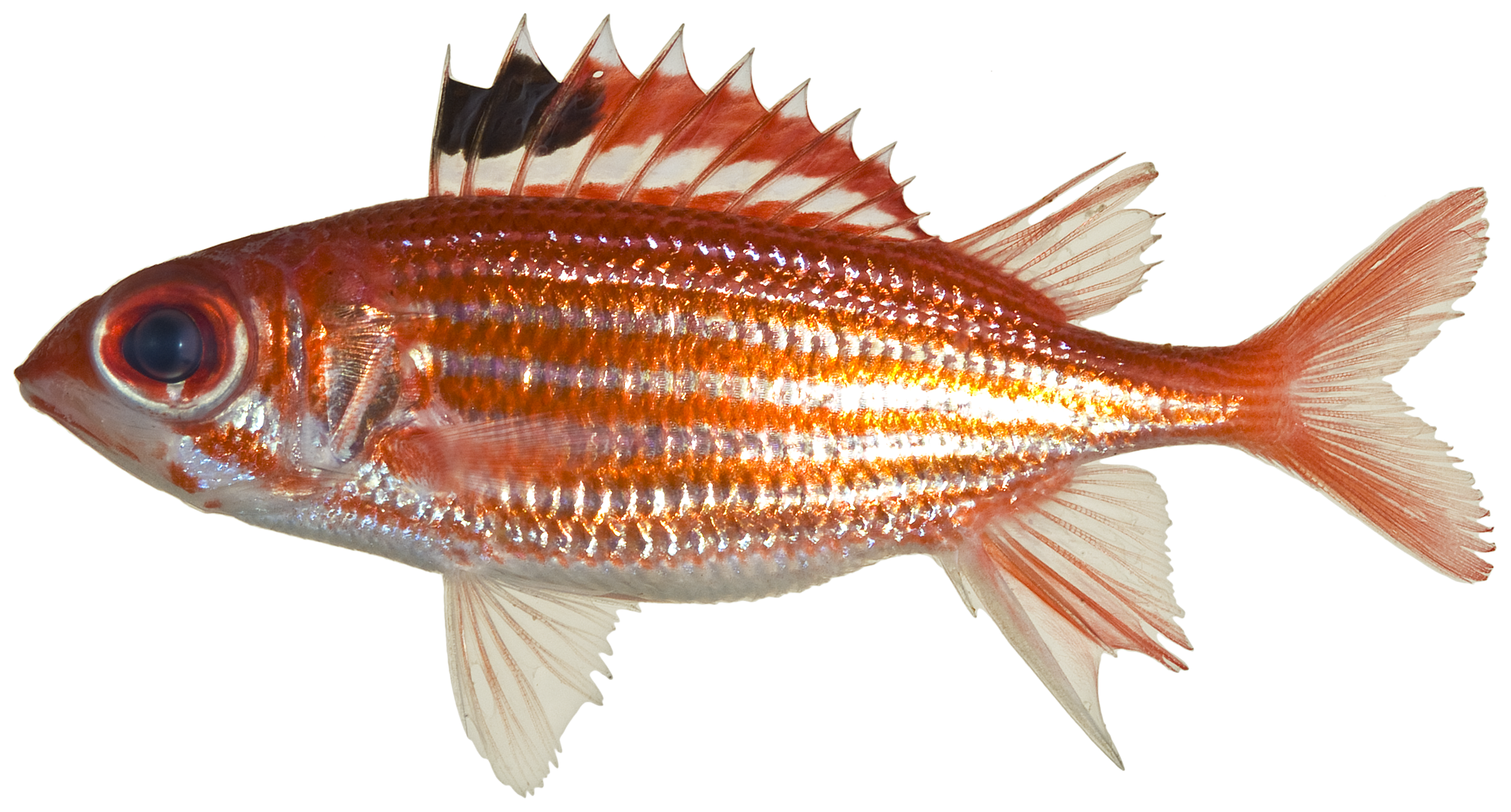

Conservation status
- Least Concern (IUCN 3.1)

Scientific classification
- Kingdom: Animalia
- Phylum: Chordata
- Class: Actinopterygii
- Order: Beryciformes
- Family: Holocentridae
- Genus: Sargocentron
- Species: S. coruscum

Binomial name
- Sargocentron coruscum (Poey, 1860)
- Sargocentron coruscum range in blue

Synonyms
- Holocentrum coruscum Poey, 1860; Adioryx coruscus (Poey, 1860); Holocentrus coruscus Poey, 1860; Sargocentron coruscus (Poey, 1860); Holocentrus coruscum Poey, 1860; Holocentrus puncticulatus Barbour, 1905; Holocentrus tortugae Jordan & Thompson, 1905

= Sargocentron coruscum =

Species of fish

Sargocentron coruscum, more commonly known as the reef squirrelfish, is a member of the family Holocentridae native to the western Atlantic Ocean from Florida, USA to northern South America. It lives over sandy and rocky substrates, as well as coral reefs, generally between 1 and 30 metres (3.3 and 98.4 ft) deep. It is a nocturnal predator, feeding primarily on shrimps, but will also eat crabs. It searches for food alone or in small schools. It can reach sizes of up to 15.0 centimetres (5.9 in) TL. When alarmed, it will hide in crevices between corals.
