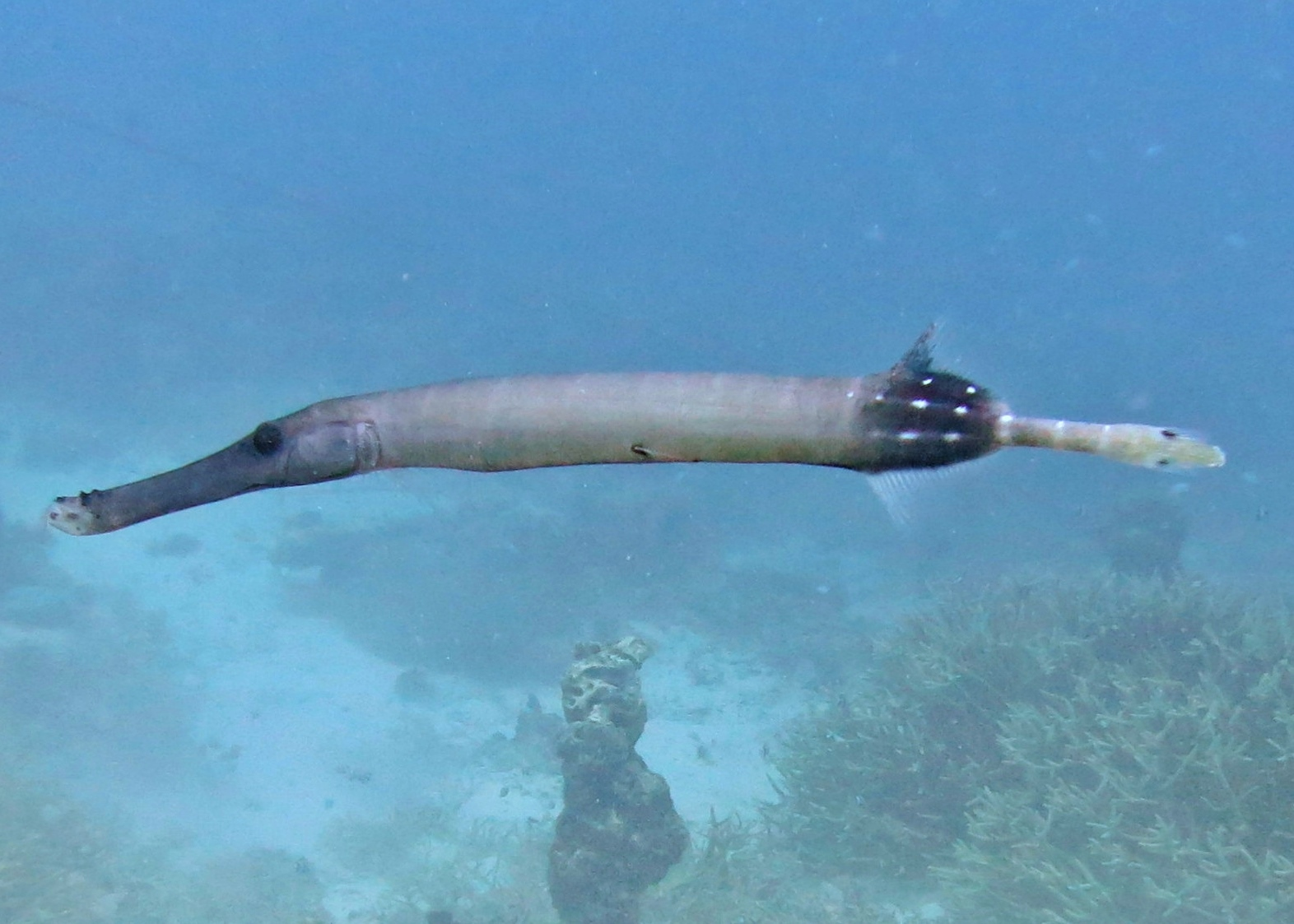
- Aulostomus chinensis

Scientific classification
- Kingdom: Animalia
- Phylum: Chordata
- Class: Actinopterygii
- Order: Syngnathiformes
- Suborder: Syngnathoidei
- Superfamily: Aulostomoidea
- Family: Aulostomidae; Rafinesque, 1815
- Genus: Aulostomus; Lacépède, 1803

Type species
- Fistularia chinensis Linnaeus, 1766

Species
- See text

Synonyms
- Polypterichthys Bleeker, 1853; Solenostoma Duméril, 1805; Solenostomus Gray, 1854

= Trumpetfish =

Trumpetfish Temporal range: Early Eocene to present

Genus of fishes

The trumpetfishes are three species of highly specialized, tubularly-elongated marine fishes in the genus Aulostomus, of the monogeneric family Aulostomidae. The trumpetfishes are members of the order Syngnathiformes, together with the seahorses and the similarly built, closely related cornetfishes.

The genus name Aulostomus comes from Ancient Greek αὐλός (aulós), meaning "flute", and στόμα (stóma), meaning "mouth", referring to the trumpetfishes' tube-shaped snouts. "Flutemouth" is another less-common name for the members of the family (although this word is more often used to refer to closely related cornetfishes of the family Fistulariidae).

Trumpetfishes are found in tropical waters worldwide, with two species in the Atlantic and one in the Indo-Pacific. They are mostly demersal reef-dwellers, where one species seems to prefer rocky substrate.

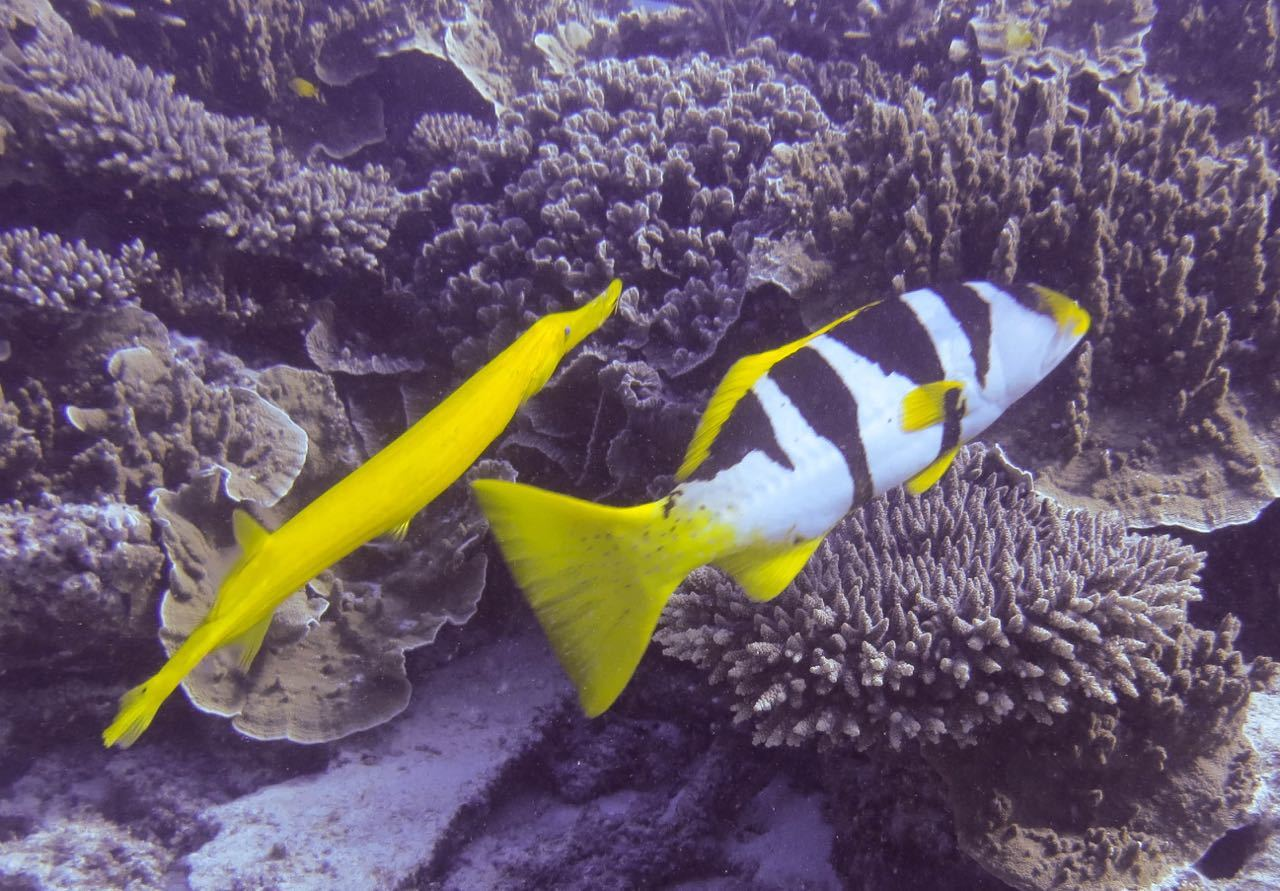
Chinese trumpetfish (A. chinensis) with a black-saddled coral grouper

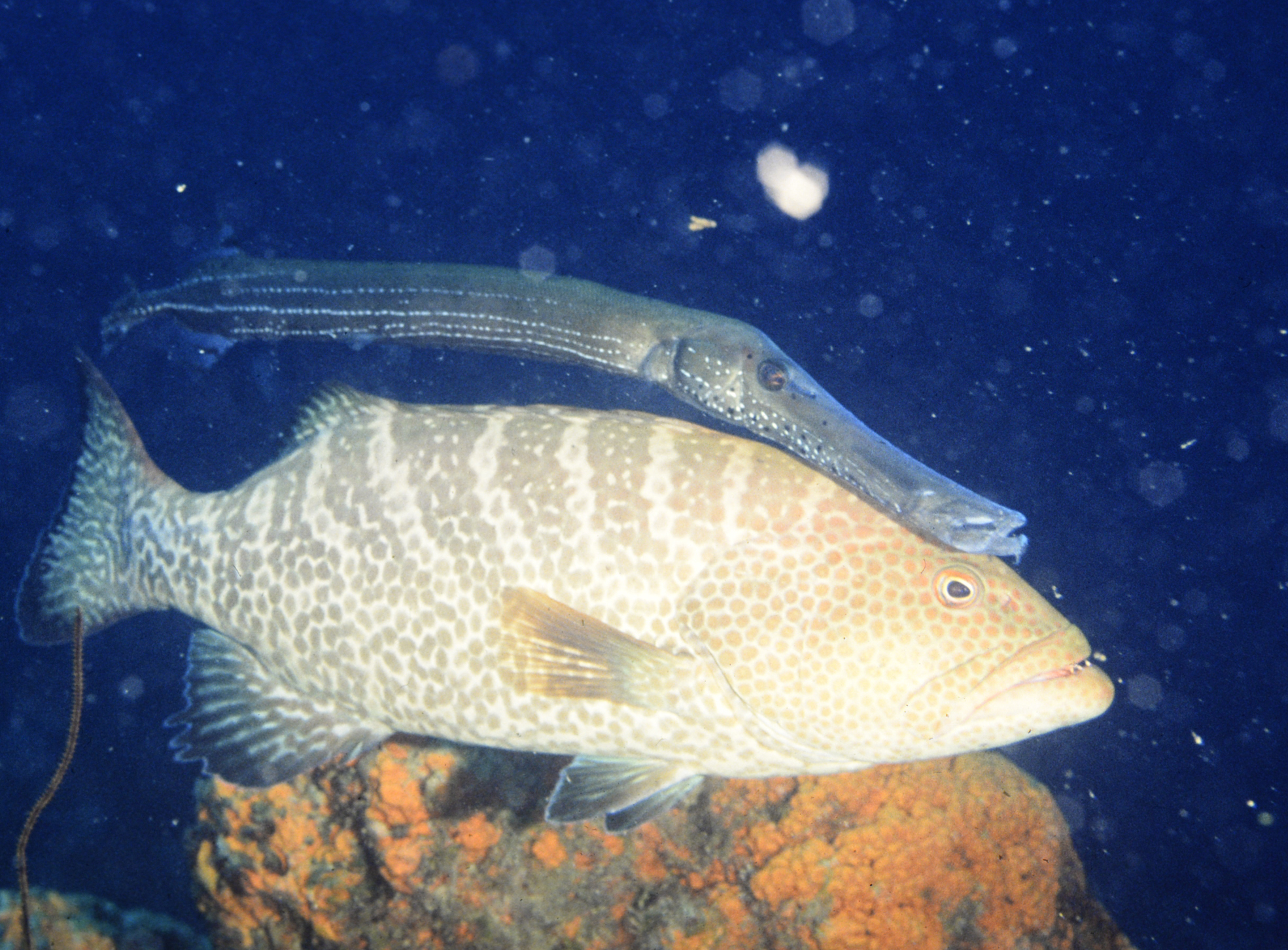
West Atlantic trumpetfish (A. maculatus) with a tiger grouper

They are relatively large for reef fish, where they reach almost 1 m in length. Bodies of trumpetfish are rigid, elongated, and pike-shaped. Their dorsal and anal fins are closely adjacent to the tail, where individual dorsal spines reach midway towards the head region. Similar to most members of the order Syngnathiformes, the bodies of trumpetfish are inflexible, supported by interwoven struts of bone. A distinct trait of the family is their long, tubular snouts ending with somewhat undistinguished jaws. Members of the family have the capability to expand their jaws quickly into a circular, gaping hole almost to the body's diameter when feeding.

Aulostomids are highly carnivorous fish. They stalk their prey by hovering almost motionlessly a few inches above the substrate, making their way towards unsuspecting prey. Once close enough, they quickly dart in and expand their jaws rapidly. Opening their tube-like mouths in quick succession creates a strong suction force, which draws prey straight into the mouth. Aulostomids are known to feed almost exclusively on small, schooling reef fishes.

While they have no commercial fisheries value, members of the family have been known to occasionally be found in the aquarium trade. Although not popular aquarium fish, they are common enough to have websites featuring instructions on keeping them in captivity.

== Species ==
Currently, three species in this genus are recognized:

- Aulostomus chinensis (Linnaeus, 1766) (Chinese trumpetfish)
- Aulostomus maculatus Valenciennes, 1841 (West Atlantic trumpetfish)
- Aulostomus strigosus Wheeler, 1955 (Atlantic trumpetfish)

The following fossil species of Aulostomus are also known:

- †Aulostomus fractus Daniltshenko, 1960 - Early Oligocene of the North Caucasus, Russia
- †Aulostomus medius Weiler, 1920 - Early Oligocene of Germany

Other extinct fossil genera within the Aulostomidae include Eoaulostomus, Macroaulostomus, Jungersenichthys, Synhypuralis & Tyleria, all from the Early Eocene of Italy, as well as Frauenweilerostomus from the Early Oligocene of Germany.

== See also ==
- Macroramphosus scolopax, or longspine snipefish (also known as the trumpetfish, though not part of the family Aulostomidae)
