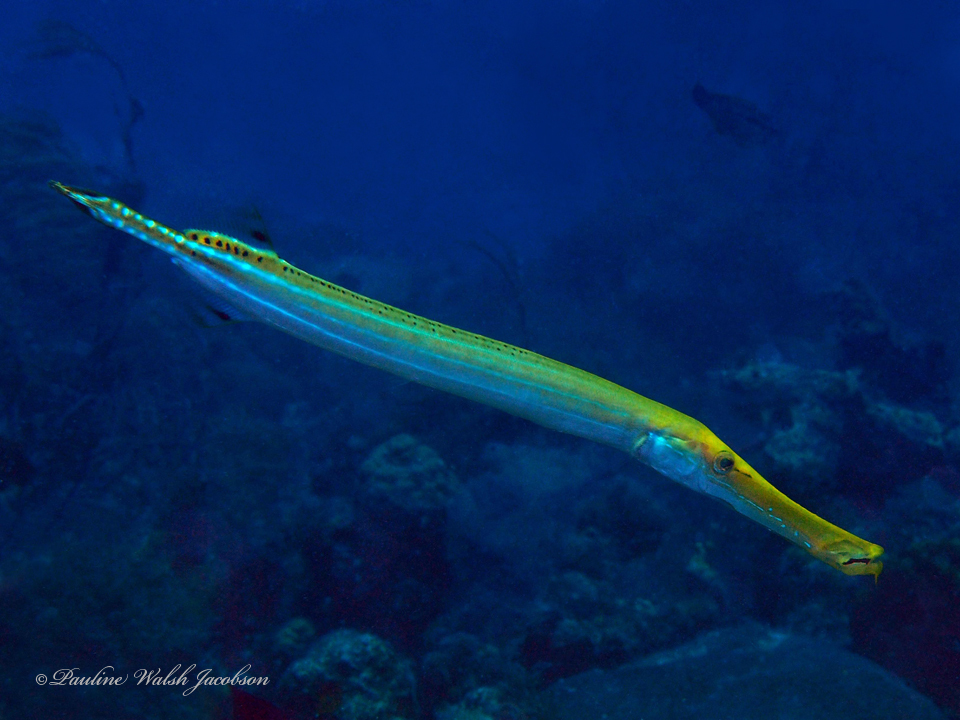
- Trumpetfish (Aulostomus maculatus: Aulostomidae)
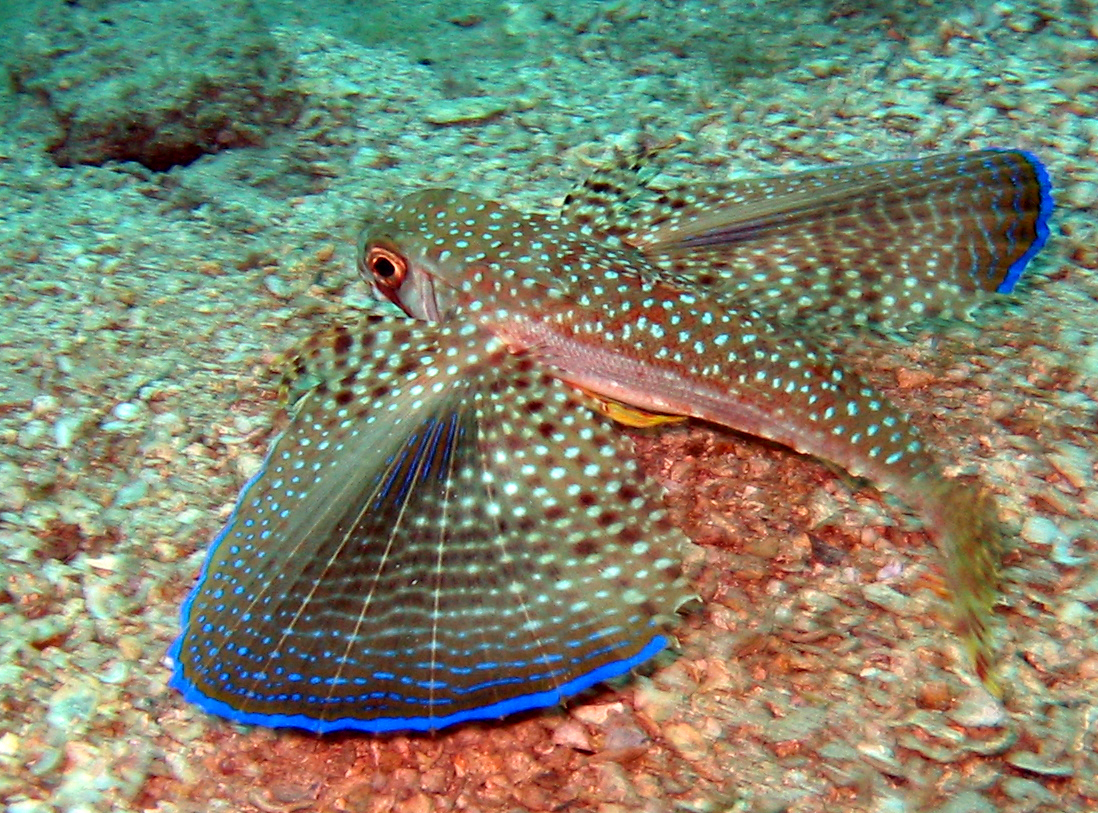
- Flying gurnard (Dactylopterus volitans: Dactylopteridae)

Scientific classification
- Kingdom: Animalia
- Phylum: Chordata
- Class: Actinopterygii
- Clade: Acanthomorpha
- Superorder: Acanthopterygii
- Clade: Percomorpha
- Order: Syngnathiformes

Type species
- Syngnathus acus Linnaeus, 1758

Families
- See text

= Syngnathiformes =

Syngnathiformes Temporal range: Santonian–present

Order of fishes

The Syngnathiformes /ˈsɪŋ(ɡ)nəθɪfɔːrmiːz/ are an order of ray-finned fishes that includes the pipefishes, seahorses, trumpetfishes, goatfish, dragonets, flying gurnards, and sea moths, among others.

These fishes have generally elongated, narrow bodies surrounded by a series of bony rings, with small, tubular mouths. The shape of their mouths—at least, in syngnathids—allows for the ingestion of prey at close range via suction. Many species of Syngnathiformes also employ strategic camouflage (such as cryptic coloration and overall physical form) to hunt successfully and gain closer access to prey, as well as to protect themselves from larger predators. Several groups, for example, live among seaweed, not only swimming with their bodies aligned vertically (to blend in with the floating plant matter), but also have developed physical features that mimic the seaweed. The pygmy seahorses are among the smallest of all syngnathids, with most being so tiny—and mimicking the specific coral they spend their lives on—that they were only recently described by scientists.

The most defining characteristic of the Syngnathiformes is their reproductive and sexual system, in which syngnathid males become "pregnant" and carry the embryonic fry. The males house the fertilized eggs in an osmoregulated brood pouch or (in some species) adhere them to their tail until the eggs reach maturity.

== Etymology ==
The name comes from Ancient Greek σύν (sún), meaning "together", γνάθος (gnáthos), meaning "jaw", and Latin formes, meaning "form".

== Fossil record ==
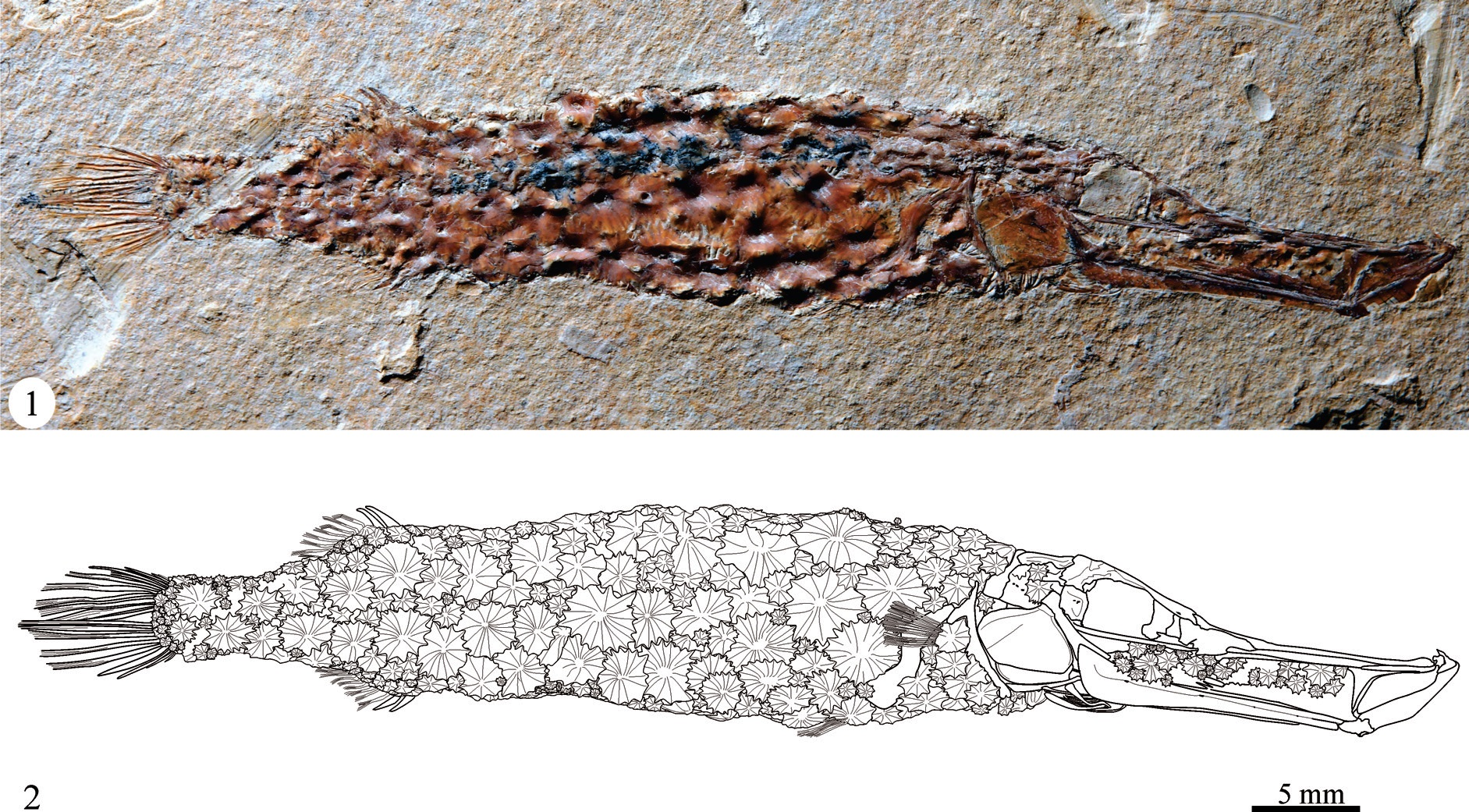
Eekaulostomus, an early fossil syngnathiform

The earliest known syngnathiform is Gasteroramphosus from the late Cretaceous (either Santonian or Campanian) of Italy, which is similar in form to Marcroramphosus, but which has some characters suggestive of a relationship to the Gasterosteoidei. However, most recent studies have reaffirmed it being a syngnathiform. The second oldest syngnathiform is the syngnathoid Eekaulostomus from the early Paleocene (Danian) of Mexico. Many fossil syngnathiform families are known from the Paleogene.

== Systematics and taxonomy ==
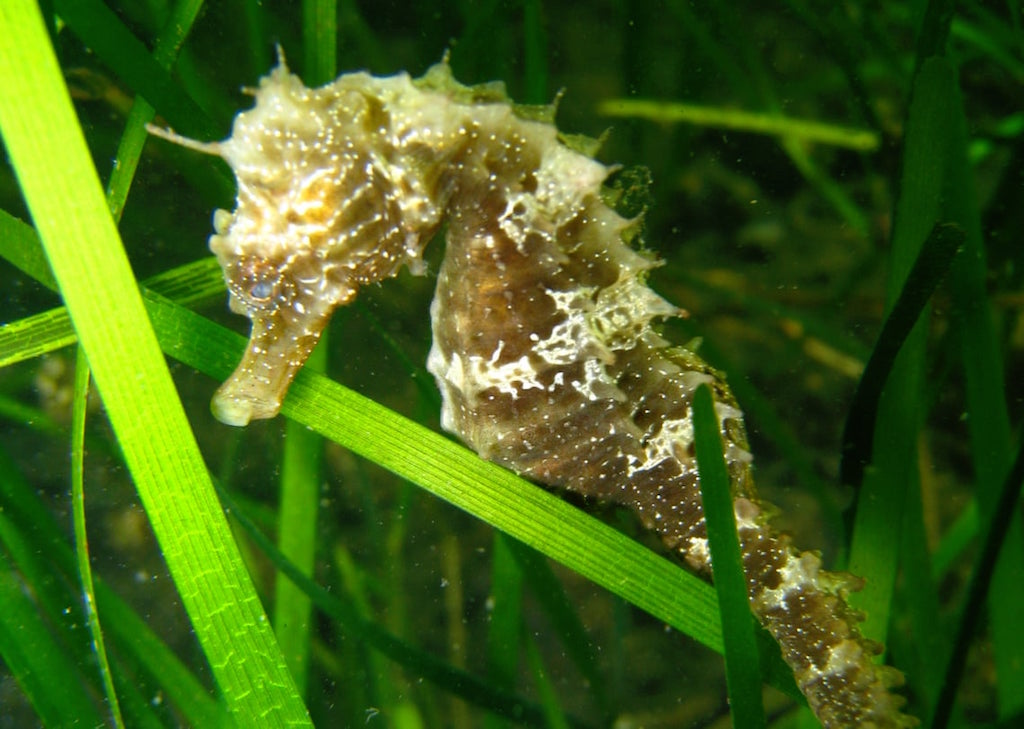
Seahorses are the most famous members of the Syngnathiformes

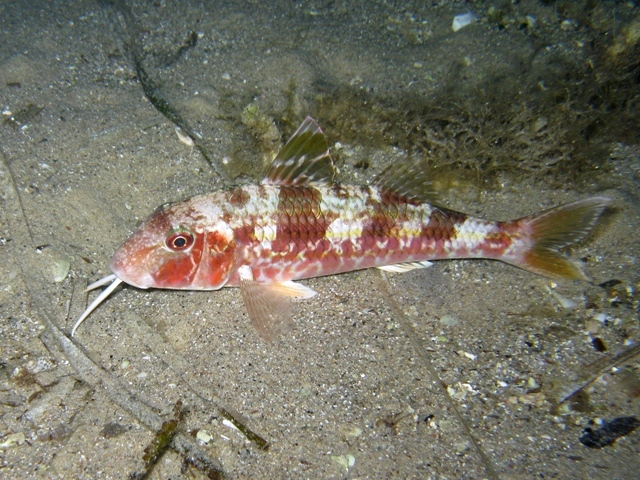
Goatfishes appear dissimilar from other syngnathiforms, but phylogenetic studies support them belonging to this order.

In the past, these fishes are placed as the suborder Syngnathoidei of the order Gasterosteiformes together with the sticklebacks and their relatives. Better supported by the evidence now available is the traditional belief that they are better considered separate orders, and indeed among the Acanthopterygii, they might not be particularly close relatives at all, with the gasterosteids belonging to the Perciformes.

In addition, the Pegasidae (dragonfishes and sea moths) are variously placed with the pipefish or the stickleback lineage. While the placement in Syngnathiformes seems to be correct for the latter, the former is possibly an actinopterygian order of its own. Following the convention of the major fish classification organizations (Fish Base, ITIS, Encyclopedia of Life), the Indostomidae are currently placed in the Gasterosteiformes.

Morphological traits uniting the flying gurnards (Dactylopteridae) and the Syngnathiformes have long been noted. Most authors, however, placed them with the Scorpaeniformes. However, DNA sequence data quite consistently support the belief that the latter are paraphyletic with the Gasterosteiformes sensu lato. As it seems, flying gurnards are particularly close to Aulostomidae and Fistulariidae and probably should be included with these.

=== Classification ===
Eschmeyer's Catalog of Fishes (2025) classifies the order as follows:

- Order Syngnathiformes
  - "Benthic clade"
    - Suborder Dactylopteroidei
      - Family Dactylopteridae Gill, 1861 (flying gurnards)
      - Family Pegasidae Bonaparte, 1831 (seamoths)
    - Suborder Callionymoidei
      - Family Callionymidae Bonaparte, 1831 (dragonets)
      - Family Draconettidae Jordan & Fowler, 1903 (slope dragonets)
    - Suborder Mulloidei
      - Family Mullidae Rafinesque, 1815 (goatfishes)
  - "long snouted clade"
    - Suborder Syngnathoidei
      - Family Aulostomidae Rafinesque, 1815 (trumpetfishes)
      - Family Fistulariidae Stark, 1828 (cornetfishes)
      - Family Centriscidae Bonaparte, 1831 (shrimpfishes and snipefishes)
      - Family Solenostomidae Nardo, 1843 (ghost pipefishes)
      - Family Syngnathidae Bonaparte, 1831 (pipefishes and seahorses)

In their study, Longo et al (2017) found short distances between the groupings on the Syngnathiform phylogenetic tree and this supported a hypothesis that a rapid but ancient radiation had occurred in the basal Syngnathiformes.

The Syngnathiformes contain about 290 recognized extant species, depending which taxonomy is adopted. Of these, 252 are in the family Syngnathidae.

=== Fossil families ===
These fossil families are known:

- Family †Aulorhamphidae Tyler, 2004
- Family †Paraeoliscidae Blot, 1981
- Suborder Syngnathoidei
  - Family †Eekaulostomidae Cantalice & Alvarado-Ortega, 2016
  - Family †Fistularioididae Blot, 1981 (likely synonymous with Fistulariidae)
  - Family †Gerpegezhidae Bannikov & Carnevale, 2012
  - Family †Parasynarcualidae Blot, 1981 (likely synonymous with Fistulariidae)
  - Family †Protosyngnathidae Boulenger, 1902
  - Family †Urosphenidae Gill, 1884
- Suborder Dactylopteroidei
  - Family †Pterygocephalidae Hubbs, 1952
  - Family †Rhamphosidae Gill, 1884
