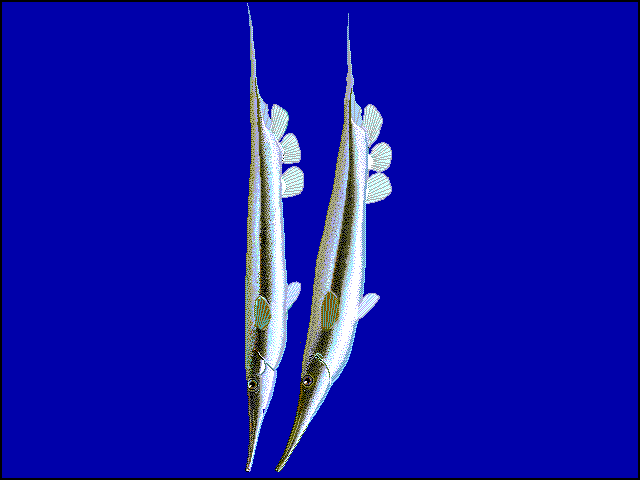
- Aeoliscus strigatus

Scientific classification
- Kingdom: Animalia
- Phylum: Chordata
- Class: Actinopterygii
- Division: Teleostei
- Order: Syngnathiformes
- Family: Centriscidae
- Subfamily: Centriscinae

Genera and species
- See text

= Shrimpfish =

Subfamily of fishes

Shrimpfish, also called razorfish, are five small species of marine fishes in the subfamily Centriscinae of the family Centriscidae. The species in the genera Aeoliscus and Centriscus are found in relatively shallow tropical parts of the Indo-Pacific, while the banded bellowsfish, which often is placed in the subfamily Macroramphosinae instead, is restricted to deeper southern oceans.

Shrimpfish are nearly transparent and flattened from side to side with long snouts and sharp-edged bellies. A thin, dark stripe runs along their bodies. These stripes and their shrimp-like appearance are the source of their name. They swim in a synchronized manner with their heads pointing downwards. Adult shrimpfish are up to 20 cm (7.9 in) long, including their snouts. The banded bellowsfish more closely resembles members of the subfamily Macroramphosinae (especially Notopogon) in both behaviour and body shape, and reaches a length of up to 30 cm (12 in).

== Species ==
Genera and species of shrimpfishes
Genera	Species	Common name	Image	Comments	Fish Base	ITIS	IUCN status
Aeoliscus	Aeoliscus punctulatus (Bianconi, 1855)	Speckled shrimpfish		The Speckled shrimpfish has a long and tubular snout which is used to suck in its planktonic prey. Its body is flattened with a keel on the ventral surface and is covered in bony plates. The dorsal fin has three spines and ten to eleven soft rays, while its anal fin has twelve to thirteen soft rays. It is a transparent pale greenish colour with a brown lateral stripe and a scattering of small black spots. Its length is up to 15 cm (5.9 in).			Not assessed
Aeoliscus	Aeoliscus strigatus (Günther, 1861)	Razorfish		The razorfish has an adaptation of staying in a head-down tail-up position for hiding among sea urchin spines. The razorfish is primarily found in coastal waters in the Indo-West Pacific. The natural habitat of the razorfish includes beds of sea grass and coral reefs, where sea urchins are found. The dorsal surface of the razorfish is covered by protective bony plates, which extend past the end of the body and over the tail fin, terminating in a sharp spine. A black or brown median band runs the length of the fish, also crossing the eyes. The razorfish can grow up to 15 cm (5.9 in) in length.			Not assessed
Centriscops	Centriscops humerosus (Richardson, 1846)	Banded bellowsfish		The banded bellowsfish is found in southern oceans at depths of 35 to 1,000 m (115 to 3,281 ft). Its length is up to 30 cm (12 in).			Least Concern (IUCN 3.1)
Centriscus	Centriscus cristatus (De Vis, 1885)	Smooth razorfish					Not assessed
Centriscus	Centriscus scutatus Linnaeus, 1758	Grooved razorfish					Not assessed
