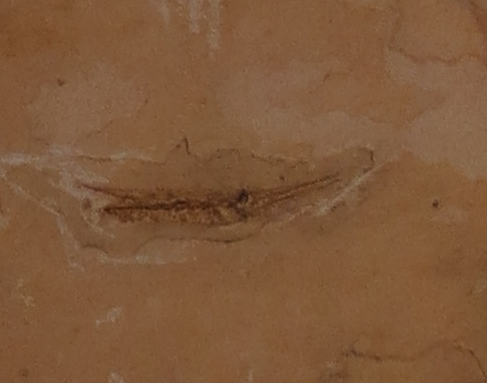
- Specimen at the Musée d'Histoire Naturelle, Verona

Scientific classification
- Domain: Eukaryota
- Kingdom: Animalia
- Phylum: Chordata
- Class: Actinopterygii
- Order: Syngnathiformes
- Family: Centriscidae
- Genus: †Aeoliscoides; Blot, 1980
- Species: †A. longirostris

Binomial name
- †Aeoliscoides longirostris (Blainville, 1818)

= Aeoliscoides =

Aeoliscoides Temporal range: Early Eocene

Extinct genus of fishes

Aeoliscoides is an extinct genus of prehistoric ray-finned fish that lived from the early Eocene. It is known from a single species, A. longirostris, from the famous Monte Bolca site of Italy. It was a member of Centriscidae, making it a relative of modern shrimpfish and snipefish. Its name references its close resemblance to the extant shrimpfish genus Aeoliscus.
