= Notopogon macrosolen =

Longsnout bellowfish

Conservation status
- Least Concern (IUCN 3.1)

Scientific classification
- Kingdom: Animalia
- Phylum: Chordata
- Class: Actinopterygii
- Order: Syngnathiformes
- Family: Centriscidae
- Genus: Notopogon
- Species: N. macrosolen

Binomial name
- Notopogon macrosolen Barnard, 1925

Species of fish

The Longsnout Bellowfish (Notopogon macrosolen) is a species of fish from the family Macroramphosidae. It is found in the Southeast Atlantic Ocean, from southern Namibia to Saldanha Bay in South Africa. It lives at depths from 200 to 500 metres (660 to 1,640 ft). It grows to a maximum length of 33 centimetres (13 in).
