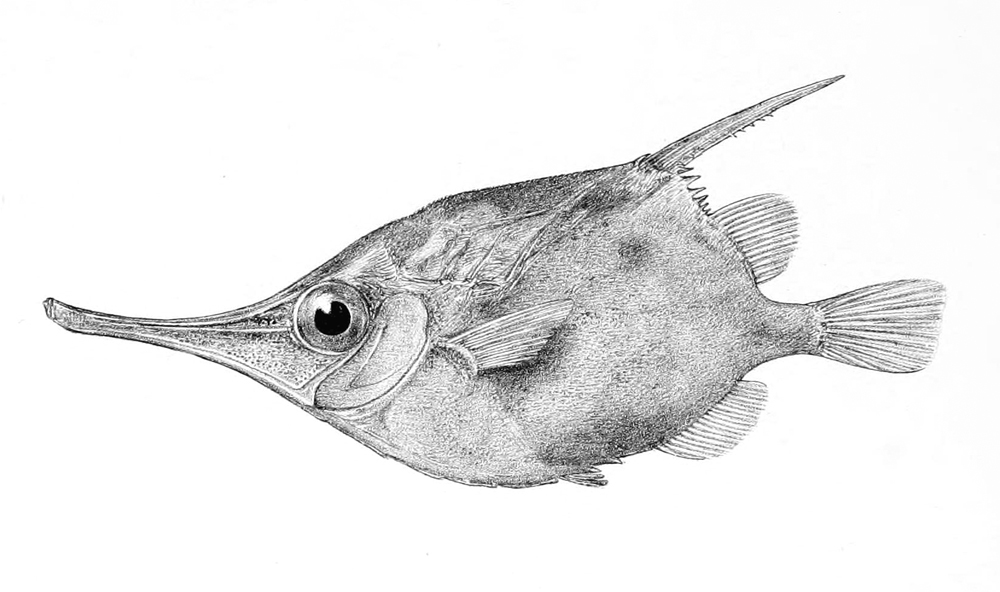

Conservation status
- Least Concern (IUCN 3.1)

Scientific classification
- Kingdom: Animalia
- Phylum: Chordata
- Class: Actinopterygii
- Order: Syngnathiformes
- Family: Centriscidae
- Genus: Notopogon
- Species: N. lilliei

Binomial name
- Notopogon lilliei Regan, 1914

Synonyms
- Centriscops lilliei (Regan, 1914); Centriscops cristatus McCulloch, 1914; Centriscus cristatus (McCulloch, 1914); Notopogon endeavouri Mohr, 1937

= Crested bellowsfish =

Species of fish

The crested bellowsfish or crested bellowfish, Notopogon lilliei, is a species of fish from the family Macroramphosidae. It is a demersal species which occurs over the continental shelf at depths of 80 to 600 m (260 to 1,970 ft). They grow to lengths of up to 27 cm (11 in).

This species has been found in the south western Pacific off the coasts of New Zealand and Victoria and Tasmania in south-eastern Australia; it has also been reported from the western Indian Ocean near KwaZulu Natal and in the south eastern Atlantic near the islands of Tristan da Cunha and Gough Island. The species was named for biologist D. G. Lillie.
