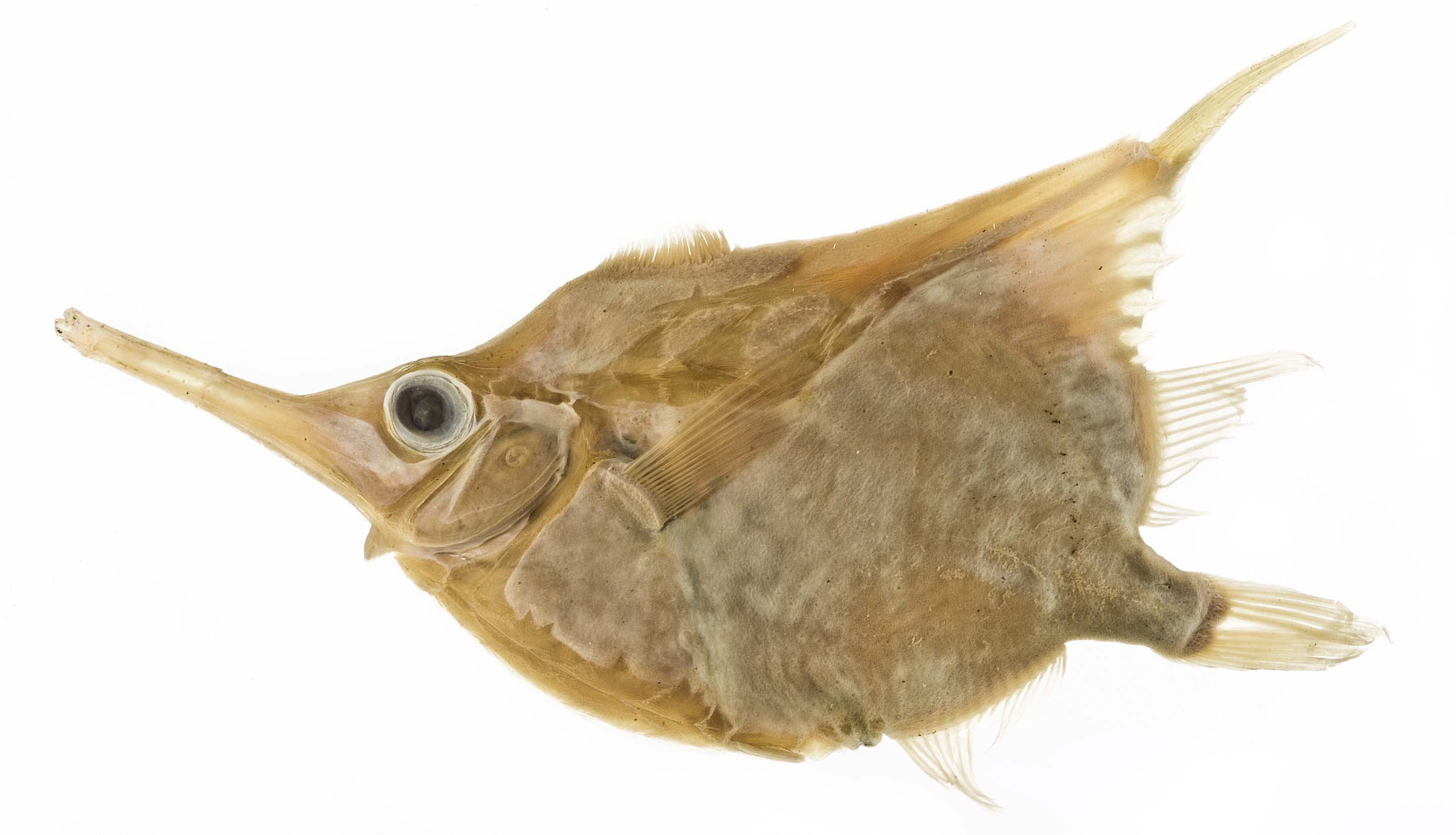

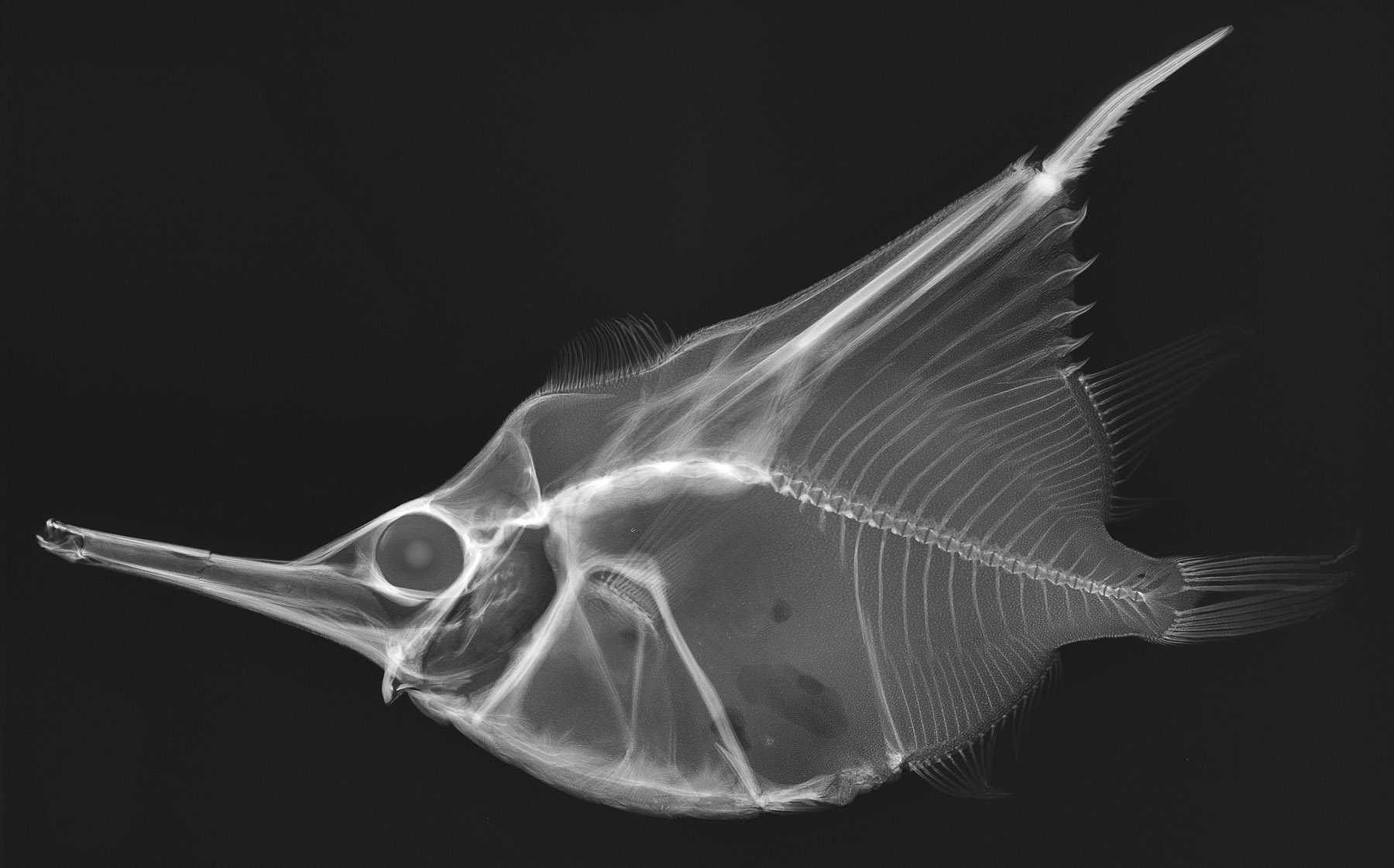
- Notopogon fernandezianus, conventional and X-ray images

Conservation status
- Least Concern (IUCN 3.1)

Scientific classification
- Kingdom: Animalia
- Phylum: Chordata
- Class: Actinopterygii
- Division: Teleostei
- Order: Syngnathiformes
- Family: Centriscidae
- Genus: Notopogon
- Species: N. fernandezianus

Binomial name
- Notopogon fernandezianus (Delfín, 1899)

Synonyms
- Centriscus fernandezianus Delfin, 1899; Macrorhamphosus schoteli Weber, 1909; Notopogon schoteli (Weber, 1909)

= Orange bellowsfish =

Species of fish

The orange bellowsfish or orange bellowfish (Notopogon fernandezianus) is a species of fish of the family Macroramphosidae, found around South America, at depths of 150 to 580 m (490 to 1,900 ft). Its length is up to 18 cm (7.1 in).

The orange bellowsfish is a bathydemersal species which occurs over the continental shelf and continental slope off the subtropical coasts of South America, in the south-eastern Pacific from Juan Fernández to the Nazca and the Isla Salas y Gómez while in the south western Atlantic it ranges from southern Brazil to Argentina. It is not known to be subject to any threats and is therefore listed by the IUCN as Least Concern. The body has six slanted purplish-blue bands with a background colour of silvery white. The gill cover and area beneath the eye are silvery while the upper portion of the head and the snout are dark blue. The fins are translucent.
