= Notopogon armatus =

Conservation status
- Least Concern (IUCN 3.1)

Scientific classification
- Kingdom: Animalia
- Phylum: Chordata
- Class: Actinopterygii
- Order: Syngnathiformes
- Family: Centriscidae
- Genus: Notopogon
- Species: N. armatus

Binomial name
- Notopogon armatus Sauvage, 1879

Synonyms
- Centriscus armatus Sauvage, 1879; Scolopacichthys armatus Sauvage 1879

Species of fish

Notopogon armatus is a species of fish in the family Centriscidae. This species is endemic to the central Indian Ocean, near the Ile Amsterdam and Ile St. Paul. It has been found at depths of 28–100 metres (92–328 ft). It can grow to lengths of 33 centimetres (13 in).
