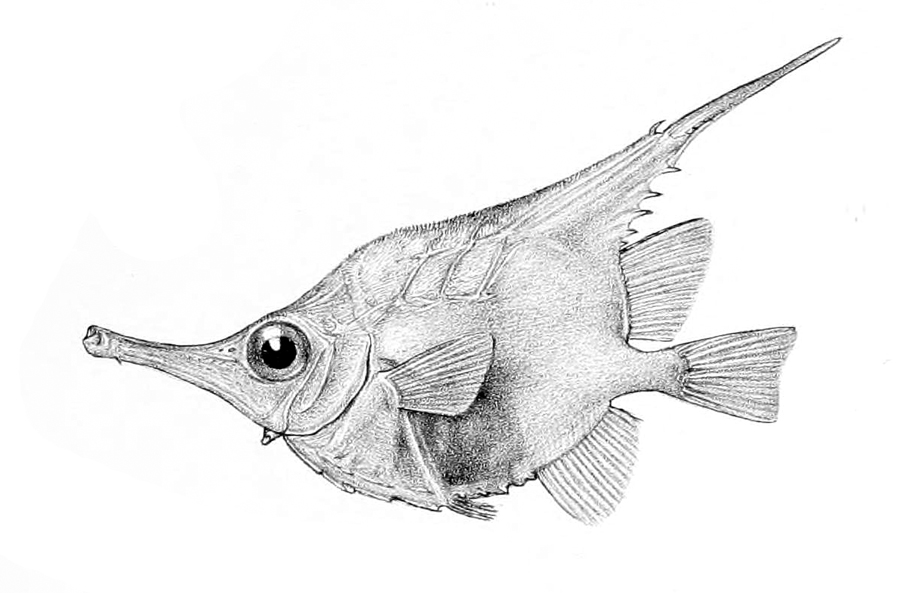

Conservation status
- Least Concern (IUCN 3.1)Pollom/>

Scientific classification
- Kingdom: Animalia
- Phylum: Chordata
- Class: Actinopterygii
- Order: Syngnathiformes
- Family: Centriscidae
- Genus: Notopogon
- Species: N. xenosoma

Binomial name
- Notopogon xenosoma Regan, 1914

Synonyms
- Macrorhamphosus natalensis Gilchrist, 1922; Notopogon natalensis Gilchrist 1922

= Notopogon xenosoma =

Longspine bellowfish

Species of fish

The longspine bellowfish (Notopogon xenosoma) is a species of fish of the family Centriscidae. It is found in the subtropical belt of the Southern hemisphere, from South Africa to the St. Paul and Amsterdam Islands to New Zealand. Its range extends North as far as Madagascar and New Caledonia. It is found at depths of 100m to 700m. It can grow to lengths of 18 cm.
