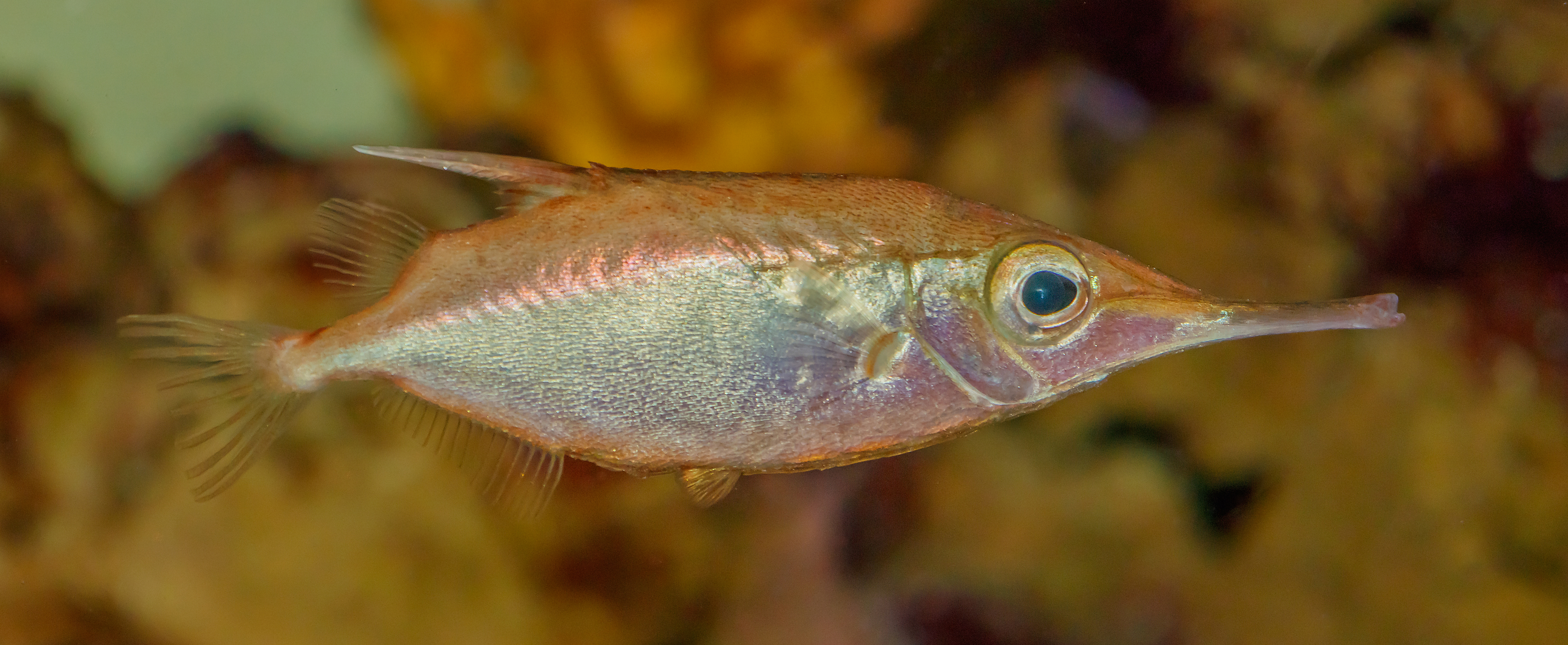

Conservation status
- Least Concern (IUCN 3.1)

Scientific classification
- Kingdom: Animalia
- Phylum: Chordata
- Class: Actinopterygii
- Division: Teleostei
- Order: Syngnathiformes
- Family: Centriscidae
- Genus: Macroramphosus
- Species: M. scolopax

Binomial name
- Macroramphosus scolopax (Linnaeus, 1758)

Synonyms
- Balistes scolopax Linnaeus, 1758; Centriscus scolopax (Linnaeus, 1758); Solenostomus scolopax (Linnaeus, 1758); Silurus cornutus Forsskål, 1775; Centriscus squamosus Bloch, 1785

= Longspine snipefish =

Species of fish

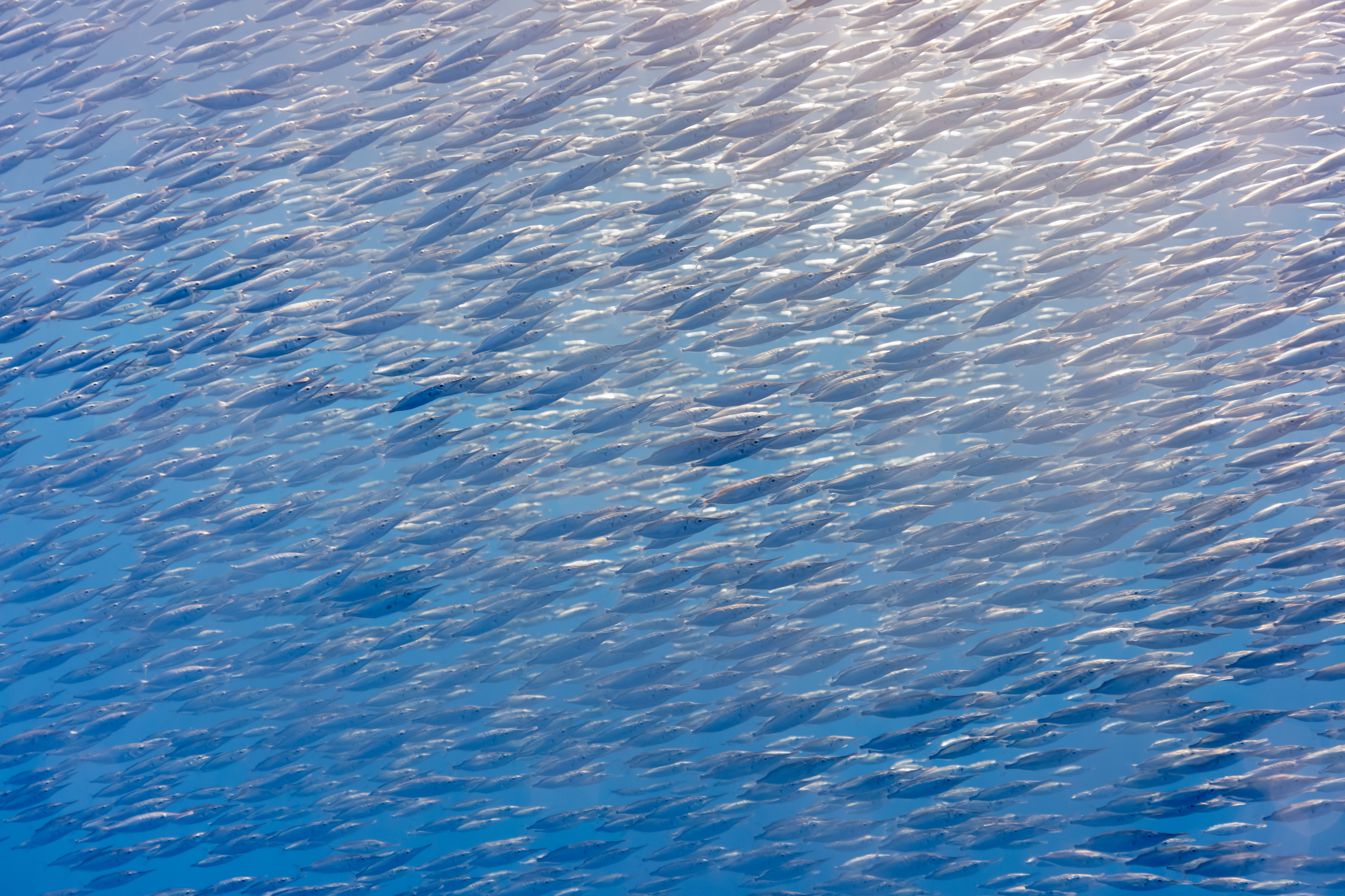
School of trumpetfishes (Macroramphosus scolopax), Faial-Pico Channel, Azores Islands, Portugal

The longspine snipefish (Macroramphosus scolopax), is a snipefish of the genus Macroramphosus, also known by various names such as bellowfish, common bellowsfish, snipe-fish, snipefish, spine trumpet fish, or trumpetfish. It is also known as the slender snipefish particularly off the South African coast.

Its distinct features, including its long, pointed snout and protruding dorsal spine, make it easily recognizable.

== Description ==
Longspine snipefish are reddish pink dorsally but have silvery bellies. They have a large eye, long snouts, and a slender spine protruding dorsally. Longspine snipefish range from 4.8 to 16.0 cm (1.9 to 6.3 in), with measurements including head length, fin lengths, and snout features. Males range from 9.1 cm to 13.8 cm, with a mean of 11.74 cm, while females are slightly larger, ranging from 9.7 cm to 16.0 cm, with a mean of 13.12±1.743 cm.

A prominent feature of the longspine snipefish is their second spine in the first dorsal fin, which ranges from 21.92 mm to 36.47 mm. Males exhibit a slightly shorter postocular head length compared to females.

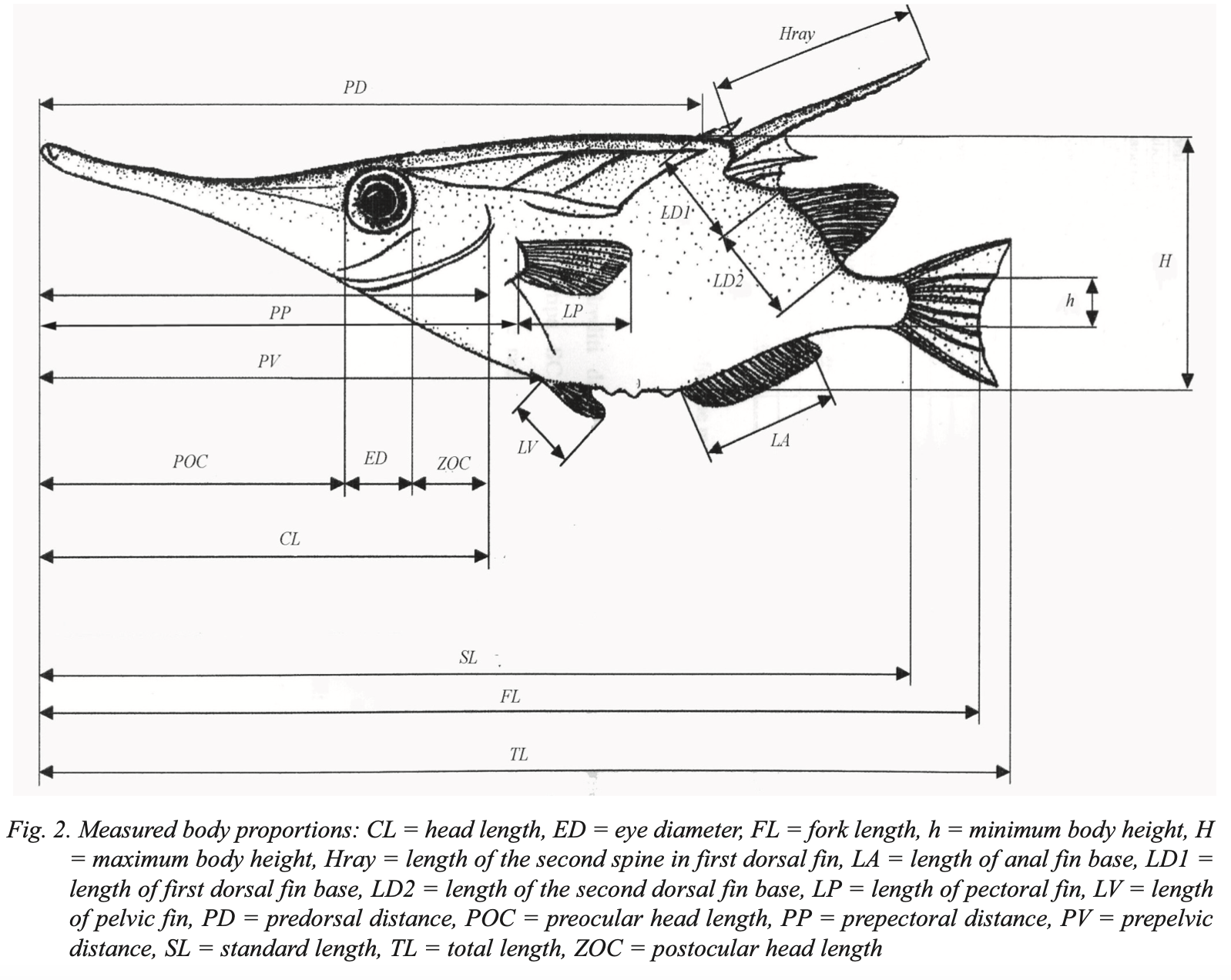
Measured body proportions

Longspine snipefish exhibit wide morphological variation. In research by Barbara Zorica and Nedo Vrgoč, three morphological types were identified: scolopax type, gracilis type, and intermediate type. The scolopax type is deep-bodied with a long, serrated dorsal spine and a brick reddish coloration. Conversely, the gracilis type has an elongated body with a shorter, non-serrated dorsal spine and a bluish-grey coloration. A series of intermediate forms exist between these two extremes. During their experiment, no data were found on external sexual dimorphism; however, individuals with a dark genital papilla and swollen abdomen were identified as females. Males showed color changes during courtship, developing darker ventral areas and red patterns that quickly faded when disturbed or fed.

In another study, Thomas A. Clarke proposed that scolopax and gracilis types were distinct types, classified as planktivorous and benthic feeding types, respectively. Planktivorous fish have relatively longer snouts, slender bodies, shorter second dorsal spines, and smaller eyes, whereas benthic-feeding fish have shorter snouts, deeper bodies, longer dorsal spines, and larger eyes. Although the studies used different type names, the gracilis type aligns with the planktivorous type and the scolopax type with the benthic feeding type, representing a deeper-bodied form with longer spines.

Further studies at the Great Meteor Seamount (GMR) support classifying planktivorous and benthic feeding types as separate sympatric species of Macroramphosus scolopax due to their morphological differences. The study also rejected the hypothesis that the gracilis type may represent a juvenile stage of the scolopax type, as gracilis specimens were larger than scolopax specimens in this study.

Another study suggests the possibility of two distinct species within Macroramphosus scolopax based on data collected in Portuguese waters, the author claimed that further research is needed to determine whether reproductive isolation exists among morphotypes and to validate the species classification of snipefish.

== Biology ==
The longspine snipefish feeds on a variety of crustacean zooplankton such as copepods and ostracods, as well as benthic invertebrates. When they are juvenile, mysid shrimps are their primary prey, but as they grow, their diet shifts to include more decapods and amphipods. Seasonal and ontogenetic variations also influence their feeding behavior, with longspine snipefish consuming more amphipods and gastropods during winter.

In the month-long NORFANZ Expedition of 2003, which examined the biodiversity of the seamounts and slopes of the Norfolk Ridge, 5000 specimens averaging 78 g (2.8 oz) were collected from three locations.

Research has shown that snipefish have a unique elastic recoil-powered feeding mechanism similar to that of seahorses and pipefish. This mechanism enables them to rotate their heads rapidly to capture prey in as little as 2 milliseconds. High-speed video and dynamic data indicate that the power required for head rotation in snipefish exceeds known vertebrate muscle capacity, suggesting that the movement is not solely muscle-driven. Additionally, a four-bar linkage structure in snipefish allows for elastic energy storage, indicating that this feeding mechanism may have evolved through convergent evolution.

Between 1998 and 2003, acoustic estimates showed that snipefish biomass ranged from 176,000 to 504,000 tonnes, with over half in southwestern Portugal. Despite no targeted fishing, their abundance declined while average length slightly but notably increased, especially in southwestern waters.

Macroramphosus scolopax also serves as prey for the Roseate Tern. It has a δ¹³C value of -20.85‰, which makes it a low-energy prey for Roseate Tern chicks, potentially hindering optimal chick growth. Relying solely on Macroramphosus scolopax as a food source could threaten chick survival and fledging success.

== Distribution ==
This fish is found worldwide in tropical to subtropical waters in the Atlantic, Indian, and west Pacific Oceans. It has also been observed in the eastern Pacific off Santa Catalina Island, California. The snipefish occurs mainly in temperate latitudes at 20–40°N, although it also occurs in the southern hemisphere down to 43°S. They are typically found at depths of 25 to 600 m (80 to 1,970 ft), especially favoring depths exceeding 100 metres (330 ft), with a clear preference for deeper areas along the continental shelf and slope regions.

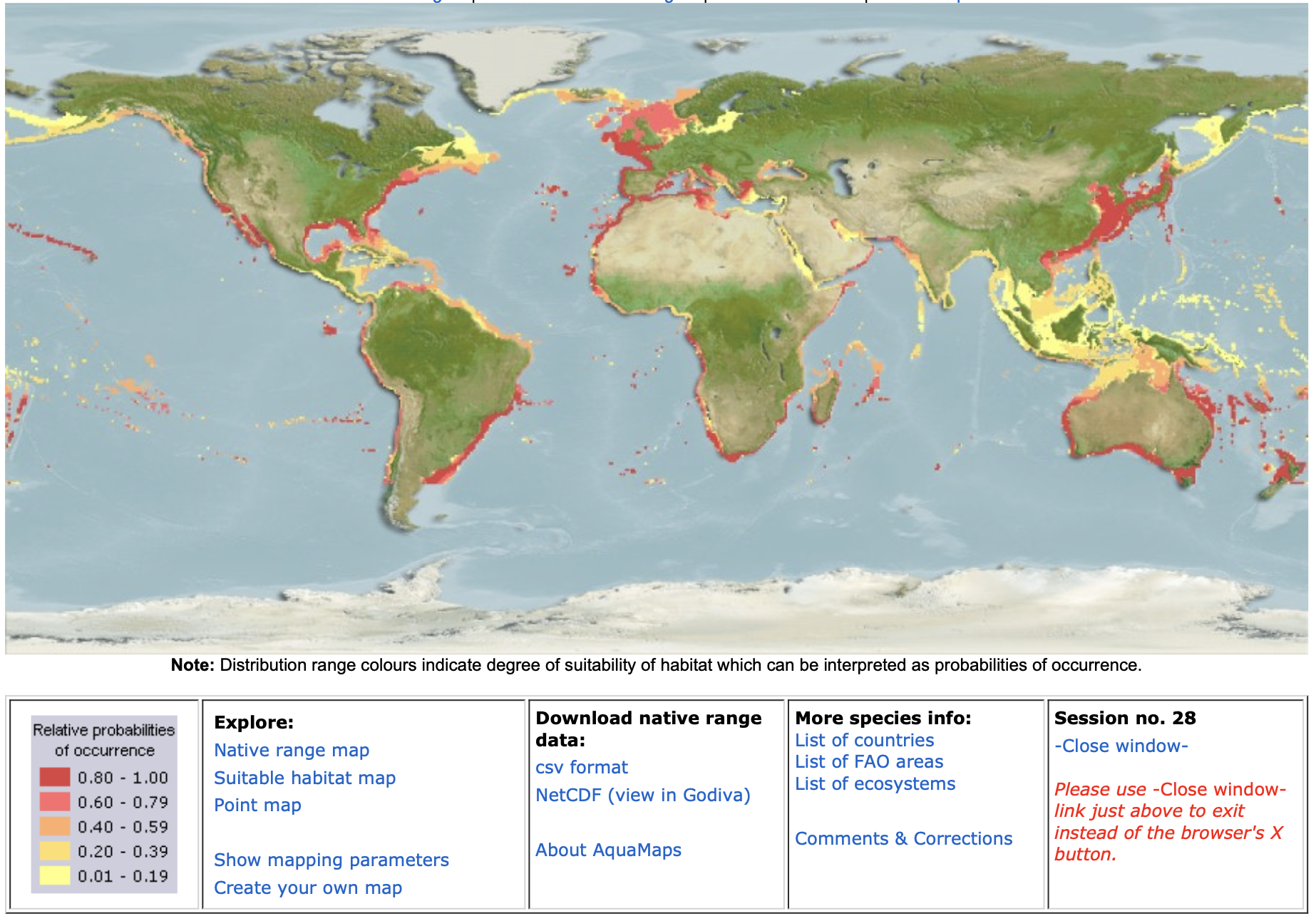
distribution of longspine snipefish

== Reproduction ==
Male fish change color before courtship to attract females. The brownish ventral area and the base of the dorsal spine become darker, while the posterior part of the body turns brick red. This dark area extends forward along the back and the sides. This color pattern can disappear within seconds if the fish are startled.

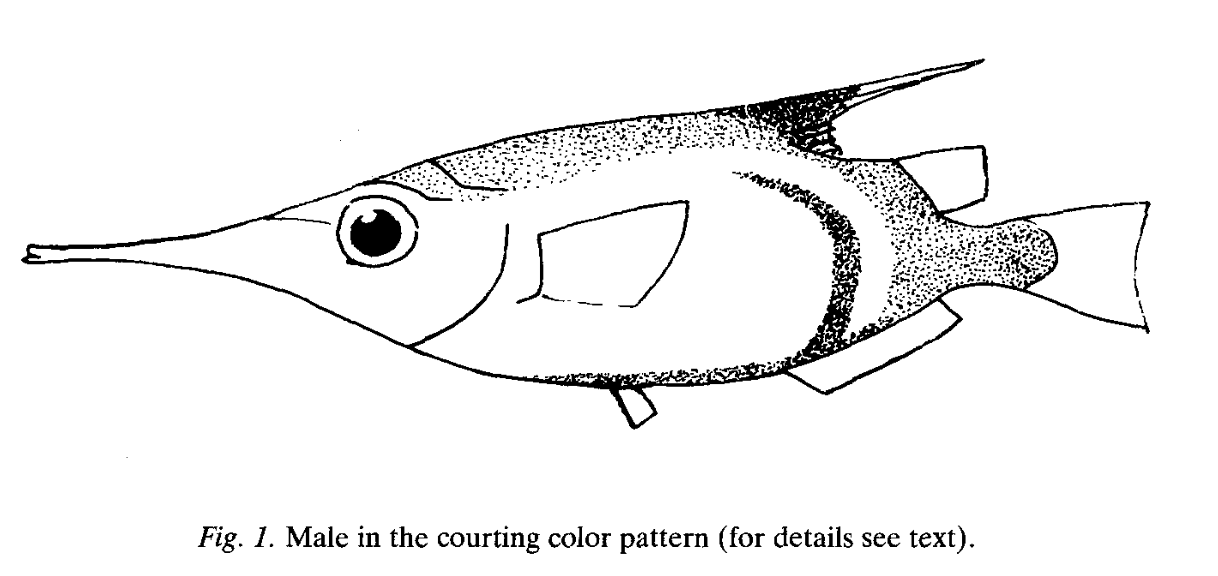
Male in the courting color pattern

Male fish exhibit aggressive behavior during the courtship period, and these fights are closely related to gaining mating opportunities. Typically, longspine snipefish maintain a head-down posture, but two competing males will swim parallel toward each other instead of maintaining the head-down position. Parallel swimming serves as a signaling behavior, with actual competition occurring afterward. Hitting another male with an erect dorsal spine is a common aggressive behavior between males during courtship. In this behavior, one male rapidly swims toward its opponent, turning its back toward the other fish and striking with the raised dorsal spine. The attacking fish then swims away to gain distance, allowing for better aim and speed in the charge. The attacked fish typically remains stationary in a head-down position and may roll its body to minimize exposure.

Courtship occurs in the late afternoon, beginning with the fish near the bottom. Courting males follow and swim parallel to the female near the bottom in a head-down position. When a male fish gets close enough, the female erects her dorsal spine. The male follows the female's movement, frequently changing position from one side to the other. Then, the male slowly bends his caudal peduncle toward the female at a 90-degree angle, while the female moves her abdomen toward the male. The two fish join by their caudal peduncle and become united. Together, they ascend to the surface, where the genital papilla of the female extends and contacts the male's genital region repeatedly during the ascent. Eggs are produced and fertilized during this ascent process. The fish separate upon reaching the water surface and return to the bottom. The author of the referenced study suggested that the ascent duration and termination at the surface may be influenced by experimental conditions, such as the limited depth of the tank used in observation.

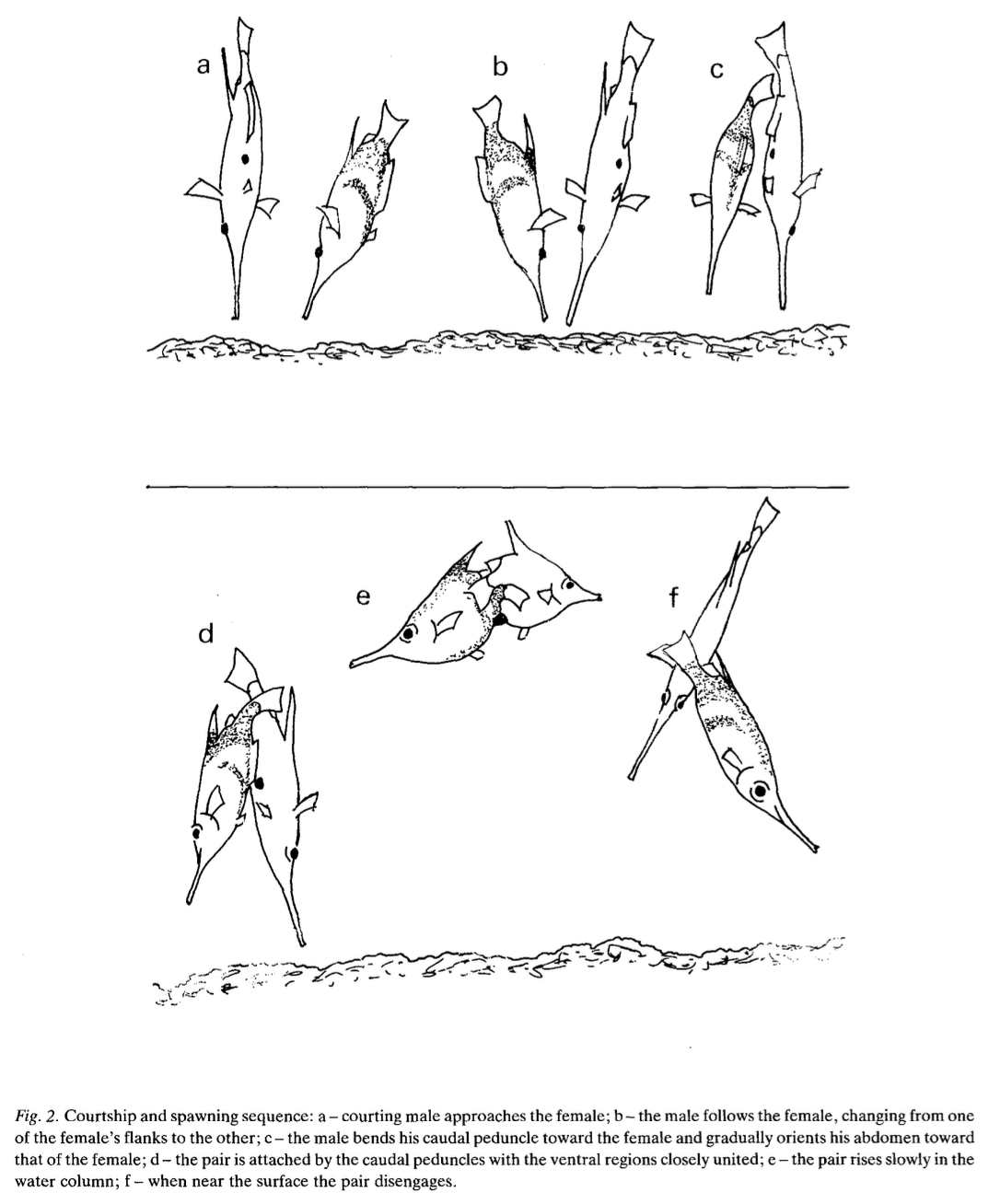
Courtship and spawning sequence

== Conservation status ==
The longspine snipefish (Macroramphosus scolopax) is listed as "Least Concern" on the IUCN Red List.
