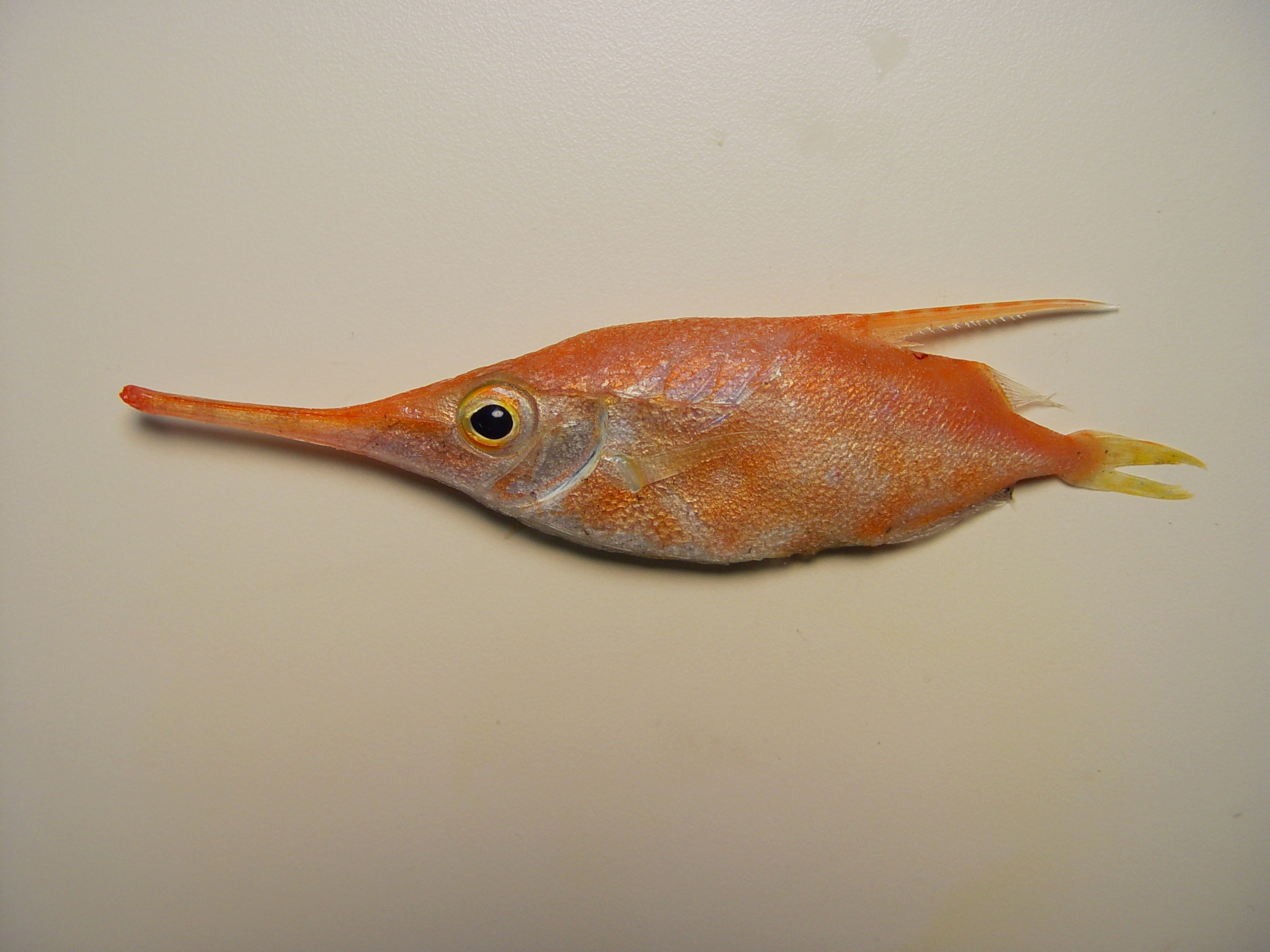

Scientific classification
- Domain: Eukaryota
- Kingdom: Animalia
- Phylum: Chordata
- Class: Actinopterygii
- Order: Syngnathiformes
- Family: Macroramphosidae
- Genus: Macroramphosus
- Species: M. gracilis

Binomial name
- Macroramphosus gracilis (R. T. Lowe, 1839)

Synonyms
- Centriscus gracilis Lowe, 1839; Centriscus velitaris Pallas, 1770; Macroramphosus velitaris (Pallas, 1770); Macrorhamphosus hawaiiensis Gilbert, 1905; Macrorhamphosus molleri Whitley, 1930

= Slender snipefish =

Species of fish

The slender snipefish or snipefish (Macroramphosus gracilis) is a snipefish of the genus Macroramphosus. It is found in tropical oceans around the world at depths of 50 to 500 m (160 to 1,640 ft). Its length is up to 15 cm (5.9 in).
