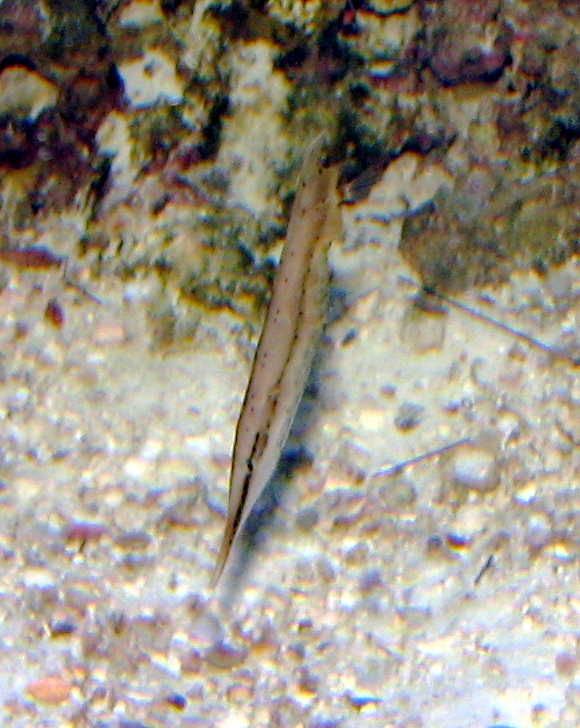

Conservation status
- Data Deficient (IUCN 3.1)

Scientific classification
- Domain: Eukaryota
- Kingdom: Animalia
- Phylum: Chordata
- Class: Actinopterygii
- Order: Syngnathiformes
- Family: Centriscidae
- Genus: Aeoliscus
- Species: A. punctulatus

Binomial name
- Aeoliscus punctulatus (Bianconi, 1854)

Synonyms
- Aeoliscus punctatus (Kner, 1860); Amphisile punctata Kner, 1860; Amphisile punctulata Bianconi, 1854; Amphisyle brevispina Peters, 1855; Centriscus punctulatus (Bianconi, 1854)

= Aeoliscus punctulatus =

Speckled shrimpfish

Species of fish

Aeoliscus punctulatus, also known as the speckled shrimpfish or jointed razorfish, is a member of the family Centriscidae of the order Syngnathiformes (the pipefishes and seahorses). This fish adopts a head-down, tail-up position as an adaptation for hiding among sea urchin spines. This fish is found in coastal waters in the Indo-West Pacific. Its natural habitat includes beds of seagrass and coral reefs, where sea urchins are found.

== Description ==
The speckled shrimpfish is a slender fish that attains a maximum length of 15 cm (6 in). Its snout is long and tubular and used to suck in its planktonic prey. Its body is flattened with a keel on the ventral surface and is covered in bony plates. The dorsal fin has three spines and ten to eleven soft rays and its anal fin has twelve to thirteen soft rays. It is a transparent pale greenish colour with a brown lateral stripe and a scattering of small black spots.

== Distribution ==
The speckled shrimpfish is native to the coast of East Africa and the western Indian Ocean. Its range extends from Algoa Bay, South Africa to Madagascar, the Red Sea, the Persian Gulf, the Seychelles and the Maldive Islands. It is found intertidally on sandy flats and in seagrass meadows down to a depth of about 40 m (131 ft).

== Biology ==
The speckled shrimpfish swims in a head down position. It feeds on plankton and is found drifting in small groups in seagrass beds, among the branches of corals and the spines of long-spined sea urchins.
