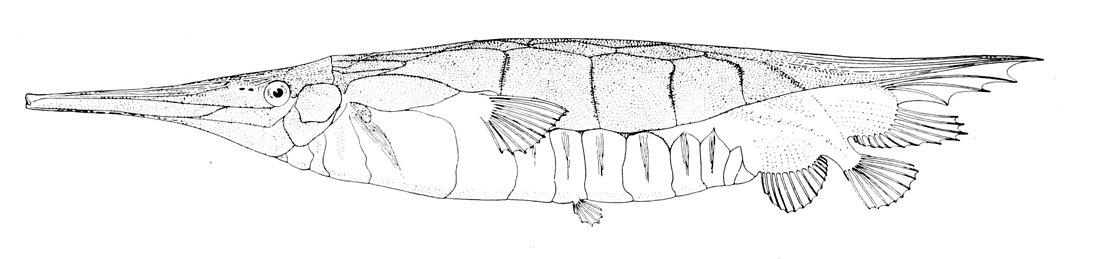
- Smooth Razorfish (C. cristatus)

Conservation status
- Data Deficient (IUCN 3.1)

Scientific classification
- Domain: Eukaryota
- Kingdom: Animalia
- Phylum: Chordata
- Class: Actinopterygii
- Order: Syngnathiformes
- Family: Centriscidae
- Genus: Centriscus
- Species: C. cristatus

Binomial name
- Centriscus cristatus (De Vis, 1885)

Synonyms
- Amphisile cristata De Vis, 1885

= Centriscus cristatus =

Species of fish

Centriscus cristatus, also known as the smooth razorfish or wafer shrimpfish, is the largest member of the family Centriscidae of the order Syngnathiformes. It is found in the eastern Indian Ocean and the western Pacific Ocean.

== Description ==
The smooth razorfish possesses a body at the same time very stretched and compressed laterally, it can reach a size of maximum 30 centimetres (12 in). Its snout is long and tubular. Its fins are translucent and the dorsal spine is rigid. Its body coloration is bright silver with a dusky to yellow middle line and with bluish streaks perpendicular to the median line.

== Distribution and habitat ==
Centriscus cristatus is found in the central Indo-Pacific area between in the west the western Indonesia until the Marshall Islands to the east, and the Australian shore (west, north and east) New Caledonia included for the southern limit to the south Japan in the northern limit. This is a benthic coastal species which occurs in estuarine brackish waters, gorgonian fields, and seagrass beds. It can be found in waters of less than 10 metres (33 ft).

== Biology ==
It occurs solitary or in small groups, swimming head down but can adopt a horizontal fast swimming posture in case of danger. It feeds on small planktonic crustaceans, particularly amphipoda and mysids. Its breeding biology is little known and requires more study but it is oviparous with planktonic eggs and larvae.

== Conservation ==
Centriscus cristatus has a widespread distribution but the species may be in decline due to habitat loss as seagrass beds are destroyed or degraded. Although this threat has not been measured throughout its range and the IUCN list the species as Data Deficient. Both species of Centriscus are sought after by the aquarium hobby but the effects of this trade are unknown.
