= Denis G. Lillie =

British biologist (1884–1963)

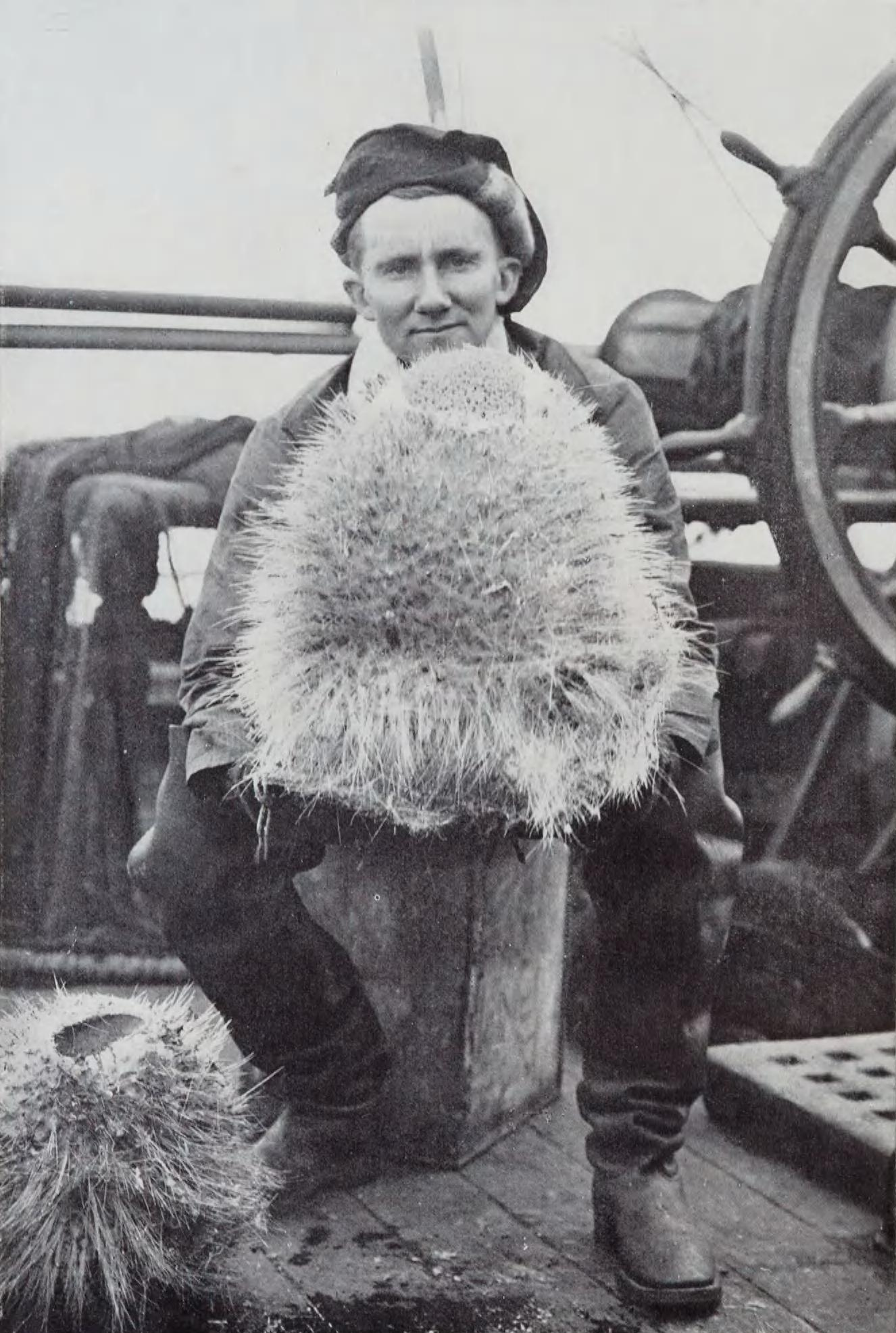
D. G. Lillie with glass sponges

Denis Gascoigne Lillie (Note: Lillie's first name is sometimes spelled Dennis.) (27 August 1884 – 13 May 1963) was a British biologist who participated in the Terra Nova Expedition (1910–1913) to the Antarctic. He collected numerous marine animals as well as plants and fossils–many of which were new to science–and published scientific papers on whales, fossils, and medicine. He received the Polar Medal along with other Terra Nova members in 1913. He was also a noted caricaturist who made cartoons of professors, colleagues, and friends: some of his caricatures are collected in the National Portrait Gallery. He worked as a government bacteriologist during World War I and then suffered a severe mental breakdown, spending three years at Bethlem Royal Hospital and never fully recovering. He is commemorated in the names of several marine organisms as well as Lillie Glacier in Antarctica.

== Early life and education ==
Lillie was born 27 August 1884 in Kensington to a family from New Zealand. His grandfather John Lillie (1806–1866) was a noted Presbyterian minister in Tasmania who relocated to Christchurch. Lillie attended United Services College in Devon and was educated at the University of Birmingham before entering St John's College, Cambridge, in 1906, where he earned his B.A. in 1909. Biologist G. E. Fogg describes his performance in Cambridge's Natural Sciences Tripos as "not too good", earning second class in Part I, third class in Part II, and his M.A. later in 1914. Between 1907 and 1908 he studied fossil plants of the Bristol Coalfield collected by Herbert Bolton, describing a new species of Sphenopteris. (Note: The standard author abbreviation Lillie is used to indicate this person as the author when citing a botanical name.) He spent the summer of 1909 studying whales at a whaling station in Ireland's Inishkea Islands.

At Cambridge, Lillie gained a reputation for caricatures of faculty members, including the geneticist William Bateson and the botanists Frederick Blackman and Arthur George Tansley. These drawings caught the attention of Arthur Shipley, who collected some of them which were eventually deposited into the National Portrait Gallery in London.

== Terra Nova Expedition ==
Around 1909, Lillie was recruited by Edward A. Wilson, chief scientist for the upcoming British Antarctic Expedition (1910–1913) led by Captain Robert Falcon Scott. Lillie joined E. W. Nelson, the expedition's other biologist, at the Marine Biological Laboratory in Plymouth to prepare. Lillie and the rest of the crew of the Terra Nova sailed from Cardiff, Wales, on 15 June 1910. The destination was Antarctica, where Scott hoped to be the first to reach the South Pole. Described as a "frail-looking 26-year-old whom Scott had doubted at the beginning," Lillie soon came down with measles. On 25 July, the Terra Nova stopped at the island of South Trinidad (now known as Trindade) off the coast of Brazil, and having recovered from the measles, Lillie went ashore to collect plants, of which 13 species turned out to be previously unknown from the island.

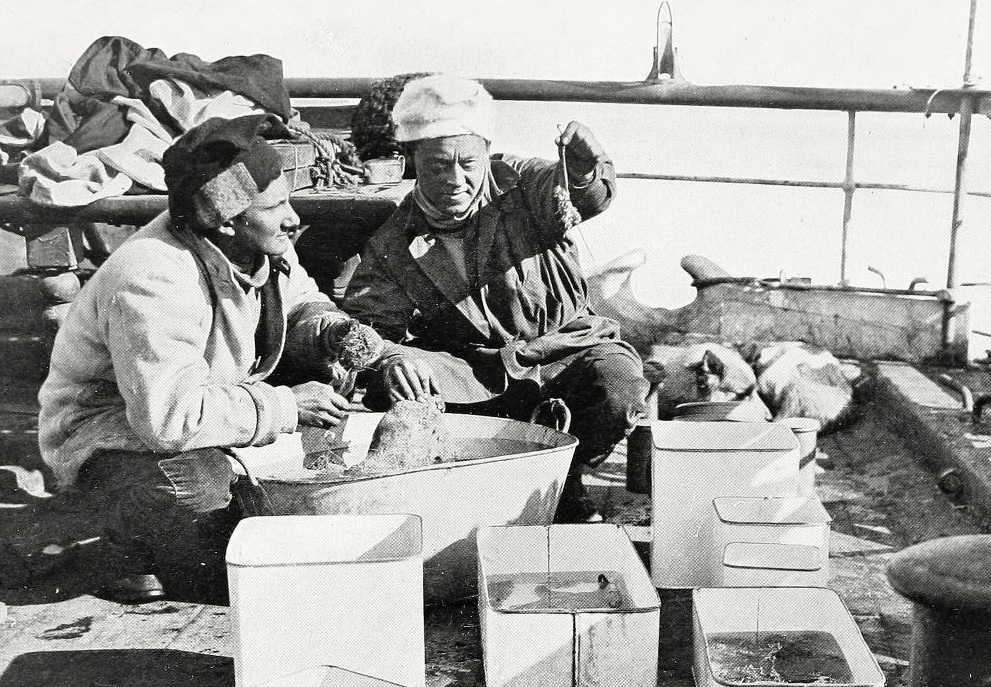
Lillie and G. Murray Levick sorting samples aboard the Terra Nova

Lillie was the biologist in charge of operations on board the Terra Nova, and collected marine samples by trawling, dredging, and tow-netting. Specimens were collected in waters off the coast of Brazil, the Falkland Islands, the Three Kings Islands, as well as the Ross Sea and McMurdo Sound. With the help of others he collected deep sea organisms including sponges, worms, and fish. Captain Scott and assistant zoologist Apsley Cherry-Garrard both recalled Lillie was especially excited to find specimens of Cephalodiscus, a hemichordate that was rare at the time and whose ancestor was thought to be a link between vertebrates and invertebrates. Wilson wrote: "trawling probably caused more excitement and interest in the ship than anything else... and the instant a catch came in-board Lillie was surrounded by an interested group of men, very anxious to see if any startling novelty had at last been dragged up from the bottom." Lillie gave popular lectures on evolution to the crew, which helped break the monotony. He was also known for his caricatures of the crew, some of which were printed in the South Polar Times, the expedition's magazine.

"A Quiet Sunday Evening on the Terra Nova", 1910

Lillie never went ashore in Antarctica, but explored other southern islands. He also paid special attention to whales and dolphins, recording all those seen from the ship. In October 1911 he visited the Whaling Station at Whangamumu, near the Bay of Islands, New Zealand, and in 1912 spent July to October in the same region on two floating factories belonging to the New Zealand Whaling Company. (Note: Lillie expressed concerns over whaling in a 1914 editorial in Country Life.) In June 1911 he gave a lecture on whale natural history at the Philosophical Institute of Canterbury, and published his observations after the expedition, describing a new species of dolphin: Lagenorhynchus wilsoni (now regarded as a taxonomic synonym of L. cruciger, the hourglass dolphin).

Lillie was described by Cherry-Garrard's biographer Sara Wheeler as popular yet perhaps the most unconventional person on the expedition, deeply intellectual yet eccentric. He believed in reincarnation, and claimed he had been a Persian and a Roman in previous lives. His nicknames on board included "Lithley, "Lithi", and "Hercules".

Captain Scott, Wilson, and three other expedition members died in Antarctica in March 1912, after reaching South Pole. The Terra Nova, with Lillie aboard, departed from Lyttelton, New Zealand, for its return voyage on 13 May 1913, making more stops along the way to collect samples. The Terra Nova returned to Cardiff on 14 June 1913, almost exactly three years to the day after it had departed. Lillie and the other expedition members were awarded the Polar Medal in July 1913.

== Later years ==
Lillie received his M.A. from Cambridge in 1914. During the First World War he was a conscientious objector and worked as a military bacteriologist, a job he described as "examining military shit for three pounds a week". He published reports on the treatment of Entamoeba histolytica and dysentery. He remained close friends with fellow Terra Nova member Cherry-Garrard. In 1917 he had plans to go to East Africa.

In February 1918, suffering from severe depression, delusion, and suicidal thoughts, Lillie was admitted to Bethlem Royal Hospital, the psychiatric hospital popularly known as "Bedlam". He had shown no signs of mental illness previously. (Note: Sara Wheeler writes that expedition member Tryggve Gran alleged Lillie confessed he was a woman trapped in a man's body aboard the Terra Nova, and claimed "When I see a naked man, I blush," citing later correspondence between Gran and G. Evelyn Hutchinson. Wheeler, while acknowledging the possibility, calls Gran a "notoriously unreliable source".) Cherry-Garrard requested to visit multiple times, but was told by staff that Lillie was not well enough to have visitors, and was frequently relapsing. Bethlem's normal twelve-month limit on residency was waived in consideration of donations to the hospital from the Captain Scott Memorial Fund. Lillie spent three years at Bethlem, being released in January 1921, and began lecturing at Cambridge before a relapse sent him to Buckinghamshire Mental Hospital in October. He was transferred back to Bethlem a month later, then to Old Manor Hospital, Salisbury, in 1924. He never recovered from his mental breakdown. He died in Redhills Hospital, Exeter, on 13 May 1963, aged 78. G. E. Fogg notes there were no obituaries in The Times or local newspapers.

Lillie is commemorated in the scientific names of several organisms collected during the Terra Nova Expedition, including the fish Notopogon lilliei, the serpulid worm Apomatus lilliei, and the sea anemone genus Lilliella. In 1913, palaeobotanist E. A. Newell Arber published on fossils Lillie had collected in New Zealand in 1911, and named the fossil plant Linguifolium lillieanum in his honour. The poet A. Y. Campbell mentions Lillie in his 1915 poem "Solus Hyperboreas", subtitled "Ode to a pocket edition of Virgil in the possession of D G Lillie, biologist to the British Antarctic Expedition, 1910". He is also the namesake of Lillie Glacier, a 100-by-10-mile (161 km × 16 km) glacier in Antarctica named by members of the Terra Nova expedition.

== Works ==
- Lillie, D. G. (1910). "Notes on the Fossil Flora of the Bristol Coal-Field". Geological Magazine. 7 (2): 58–67. Bibcode:1910GeoM....7...58L. doi:10.1017/S001675680013273X. S2CID 130273971.
- Lillie, D. G. (1910). "On petrified plant remains from the Upper Coal Measures of Bristol". Proceedings of the Cambridge Philosophical Society. 15: 411–412.
- Lillie, D. G. (1910). "Observations on the Anatomy and General Biology of some Members of the Larger Cetacea". Proceedings of the Zoological Society of London. 80 (3): 769–792. doi:10.1111/j.1096-3642.1910.tb01916.x.
- Lillie, D. G. (1913). "Summary of biological work carried out on board the Terra Nova 1910–1913". In Huxley, Leonard (ed.). Scott's Last Expedition. Vol. II. London: Smith, Elder & Co. pp. 475–484.
- Harmer, S.F.; Lillie, D. G. (1914). "List of collecting stations. British Antarctic ("Terra Nova") Expedition, 1910 British Museum (Natural History)". Natural History Report, Zoology. 2 (1): 1–12.
- Lillie, D. G. (1915). "Cetacea. British Antarctic ("Terra Nova") Expedition, 1910 British Museum (Natural History)". Natural History Report, Zoology. 1 (3): 85–124.
- Inman, A.C.; Lillie, D.G. (1917). "A Contribution to the Study of Dysentery". The Lancet. 189 (4884): 533–534. doi:10.1016/S0140-6736(01)38919-5.
- Lillie, D.G.; Shepheard, S. (1917). "A Report on the Treatment of Entamoeba histolytica "Carriers" with Emetine Bismuth Iodide". The Lancet. 190 (4907): 418–419. doi:10.1016/S0140-6736(01)51966-2.
- Shepheard, S.; Lillie, D.G. (1918). "Persistent Carriers of Entamoeba histolytica. Treatment with Chaparro Amargosa and Simaruba". The Lancet. 191 (4936): 501–502. doi:10.1016/S0140-6736(01)26126-1. PMC 10190825.
