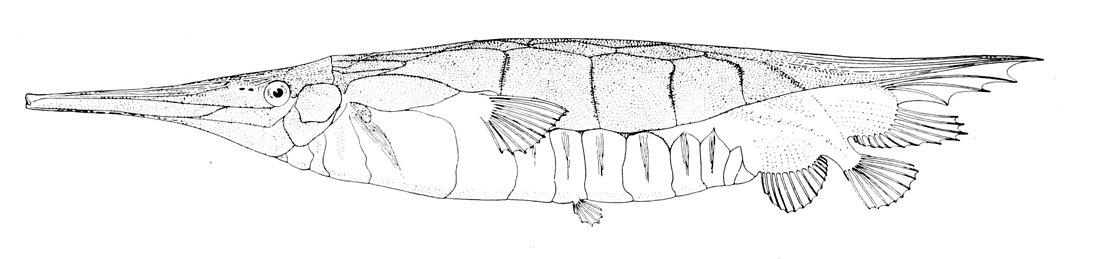
- Smooth Razorfish (C. cristatus)
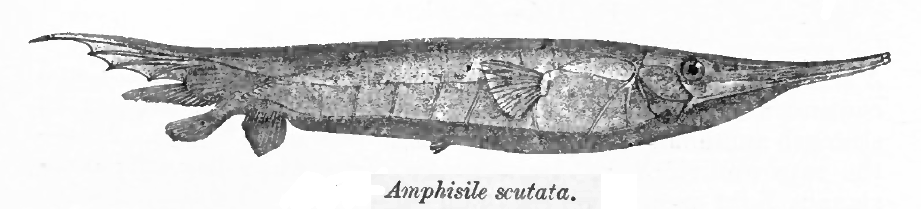
- Grooved Razorfish (C. scutatus)

Scientific classification
- Kingdom: Animalia
- Phylum: Chordata
- Class: Actinopterygii
- Division: Teleostei
- Order: Syngnathiformes
- Suborder: Syngnathoidei
- Superfamily: Centriscoidea
- Family: Centriscidae
- Genus: Centriscus; Linnaeus, 1758

Type species
- Centriscus scutatus Linnaeus, 1758

Synonyms
- Acentrachme Gill, 1862

= Centriscus =

Genus of fishes

Centriscus is a genus of shrimpfishes found in the Indian and Pacific Oceans.

== Species ==
Currently, two recognized species are placed in this genus:

- Centriscus cristatus (De Vis, 1885) (smooth razorfish)
- Centriscus scutatus Linnaeus, 1758 (grooved razorfish)
