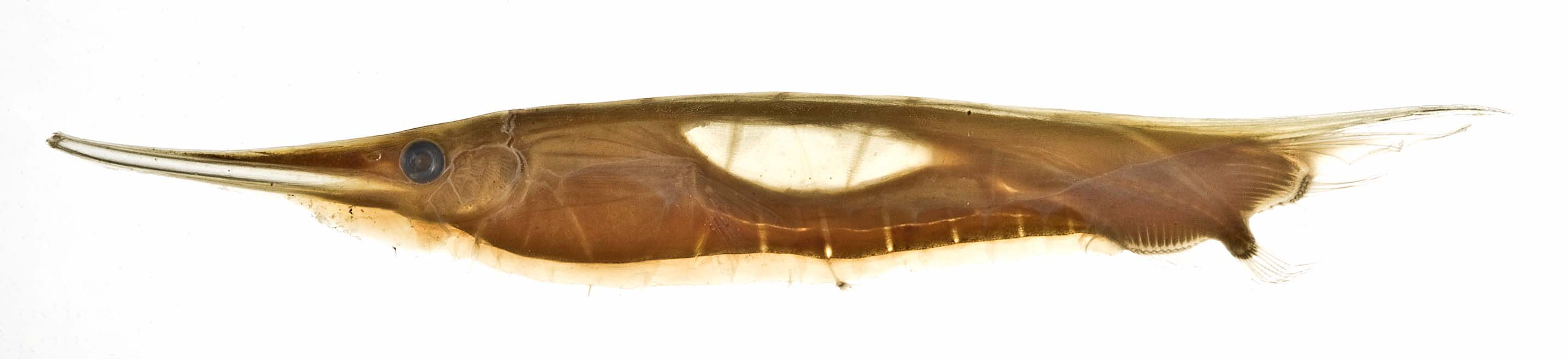

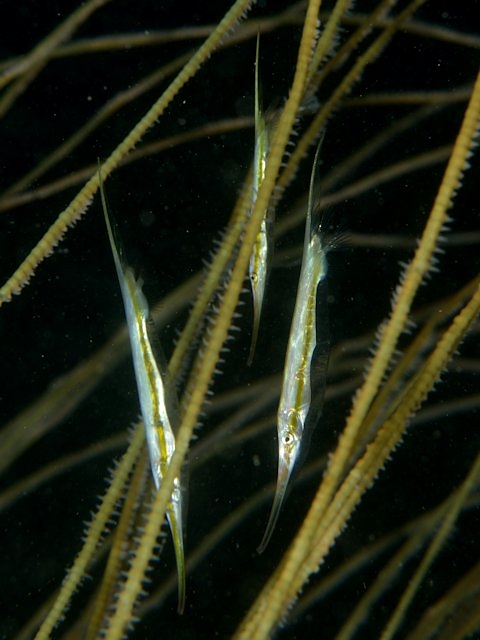

Conservation status
- Least Concern (IUCN 3.1)

Scientific classification
- Kingdom: Animalia
- Phylum: Chordata
- Class: Actinopterygii
- Order: Syngnathiformes
- Family: Centriscidae
- Genus: Centriscus
- Species: C. scutatus

Binomial name
- Centriscus scutatus Linnaeus, 1758

Synonyms
- Centriscus capito Oshima, 1922; Amphisile finschii Hilgendorf, 1884; Amphislie macrophthalma Steindachner, 1860; Amphisile scutata Linnaeus, 1758

= Centriscus scutatus =

Species of fish

Centriscus scutatus is a slender fish that reaches a length of 15 cm (5.9 in). It is found at depth between 2 and 333 m (typically 2–15 m) in the Indian and Pacific oceans, from the Red Sea and Persian Gulf up to Japan, New Caledonia and Australia. This coastal species inhabits mud or silty sand next to sea grasses or corals. It swims almost vertically, sometimes in large groups, with head pointed downwards, and feeds on small crustaceans.
