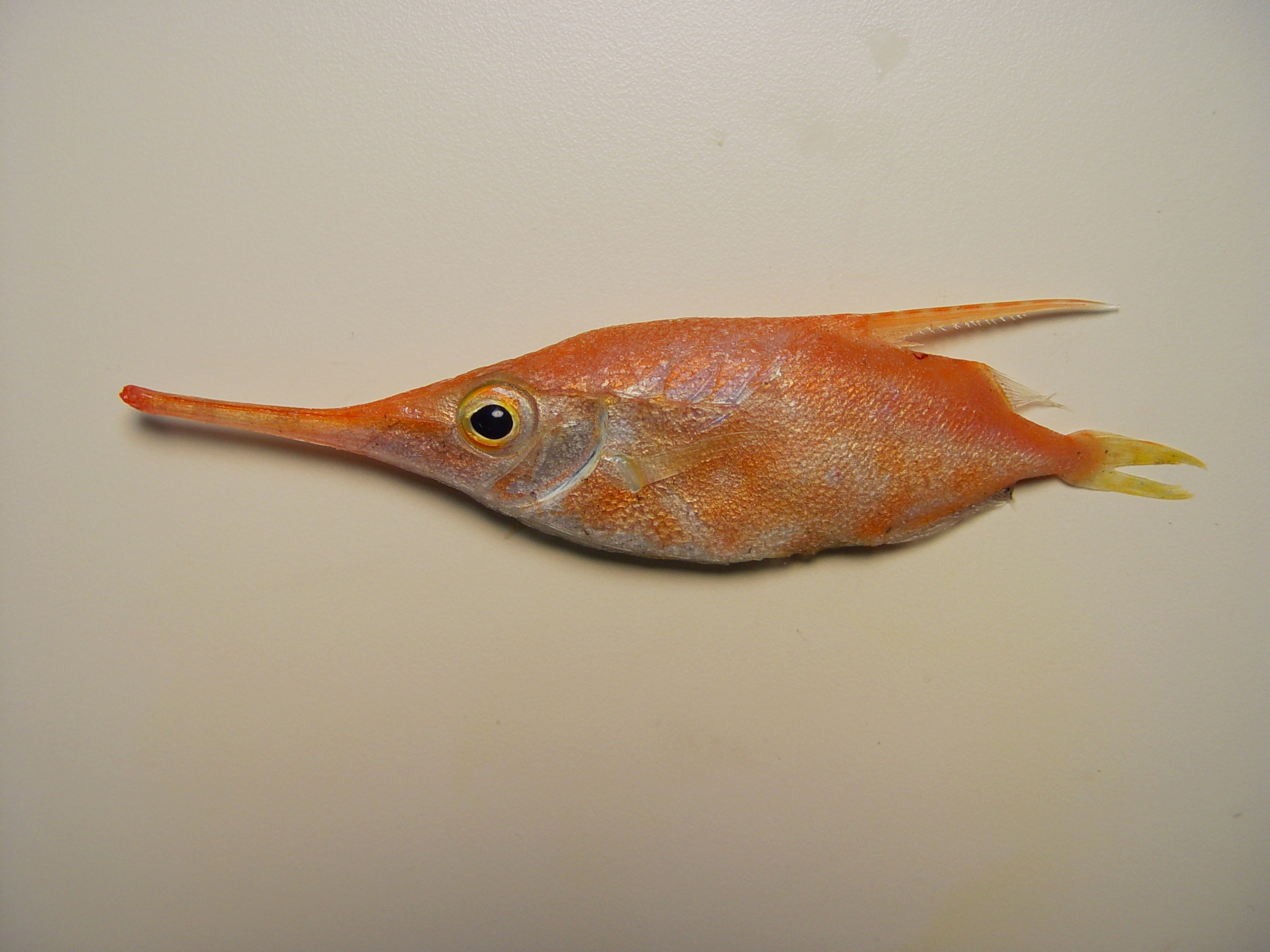
- Macroramphosus gracilis

Scientific classification
- Kingdom: Animalia
- Phylum: Chordata
- Class: Actinopterygii
- Division: Teleostei
- Order: Syngnathiformes
- Suborder: Syngnathoidei
- Superfamily: Centriscoidea
- Family: Centriscidae
- Subfamily: Macroramphosinae
- Genus: Macroramphosus; Lacépède, 1803

Type species
- Silurus cornutus Forsskål, 1775

Species
- See text

= Macroramphosus =

Genus of fishes

Macroramphosus, snipefishes or bellowfishes, is a genus of fishes found in tropical and subtropical oceans at depths down to 600 metres (2,000 ft). They have long second spines on their dorsal fins and tiny mouths at the tip of their greatly elongated snouts. The bodies of snipefish are more streamlined than in the related bellowfishes. They reach a maximum length of about 20 cm (7.9 in), and are silvery or reddish in colour. They are sometimes found in large schools. This is the only genus on the monogeneric family Macroranphosidae but some authorities include the genera Centriscops and Notopogon in this family too.

According to FishBase, they are part of the family Centriscidae, but Nelson (2016) split that family, in which case the genus Macroramphosus is in the family Macroramphosidae. However, Eschmeyer's Catalog of Fishes has returned to classifying the macroramphosids within the Centriscidae.

== Species ==
Currently, three recognized species are placed in this genus:

- Macroramphosus gracilis (R. T. Lowe, 1839) (slender snipefish)
- Macroramphosus sagifue Jordan & Starks, 1902
- Macroramphosus scolopax (Linnaeus, 1758) (longspine snipefish)
