= Simpson Glacier =

Glacier in Antarctica

- Location within Antarctica
- Location: Victoria Land
- Coordinates: 71°17′S 168°38′E

Simpson Glacier (71°17′S 168°38′E) is a glacier, 6 nautical miles (11 km; 6.9 mi), in the Admiralty Mountains, Antarctica. It flows northward to the coast between Nelson Cliff and Mount Cherry-Garrard where it forms the Simpson Glacier Tongue.

== Exploration and naming ==
The Simpson Glacier Tongue was named by the British Antarctic Expedition, 1910–13 (BrAE), after Sir George Simpson, meteorologist of the expedition. The glacier described was mapped by United States Geological Survey (USGS), 1960–63, and was so named by United States Advisory Committee on Antarctic Names (US-ACAN) because (with Fendley Glacier to the east) it nourishes the Simpson Glacier Tongue.

== Location ==
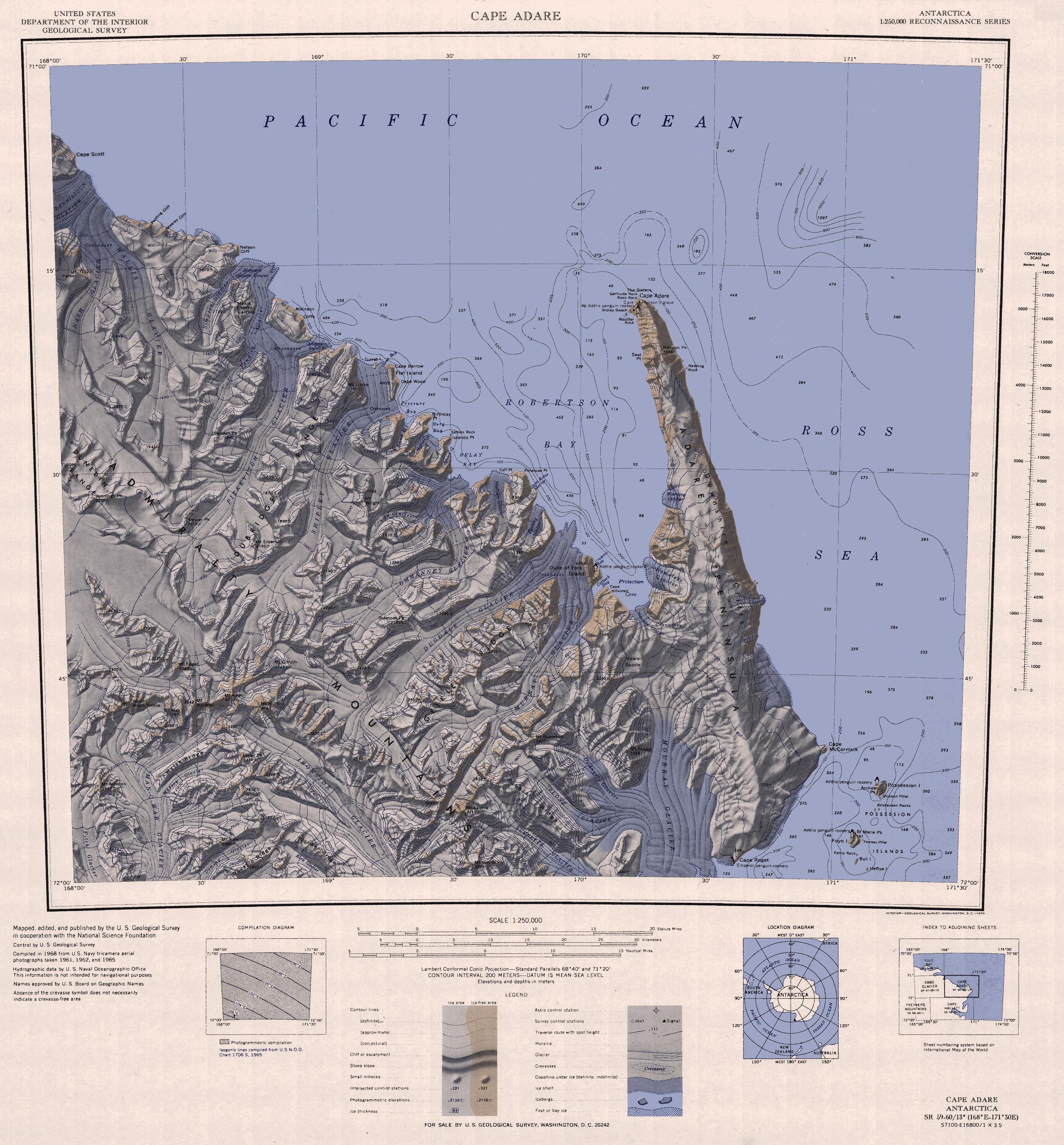
Simpson Glacier towards northwest

The Simpson Glacier flows north through the Admiralty Mountains between the Wallis Glacier to the west and the Fendley Glacier to the east. The Simpson and Fendley glaciers pass on either side of Mount Cherry-Garrard and join in the Simpson Glacier Tongue which protrudes from the north coast of Victoria Land into the Pacific Ocean to the southeast of Nelson Cliff. The Fendley Glacier receives some ice from the Pitkevitch Glacier to its east.

== Features ==
=== Fendley Glacier ===
71°18′S 168°47′E. A glacier, 17 nautical miles (31 km; 20 mi) long, flowing northeast from the Admiralty Mountains to enter the sea between Mount Cherry-Garrard and Atkinson Cliffs. Mapped by USGS from surveys and United States Navy air photos, 1960-63. Named by US-ACAN for Tech. Sergeant Iman A. Fendley, United States Air Force, who perished in the crash of a C-124 Globemaster aircraft in this vicinity in 1958.

=== Mount Cherry-Garrard ===
71°18′S 168°41′E. A peak at the seaward end of the divide between Simpson Glacier and Fendley Glacier. Charted by the Northern Party, led by Victor Campbell, of the BrAE, 1910-13. They named the feature for Apsley Cherry-Garrard, Assistant Zoologist on the expedition.

=== Simpson Glacier Tongue ===
71°15′S 168°45′E. A small floating glacier tongue nourished by Simpson Glacier and Fendley Glacier as it extends into the sea between Nelson Cliff and Atkinson Cliffs. Charted by the Northern Party, led by Campbell, of the BrAE, 1910-13. Named for Doctor (later Sir) George Clarke Simpson, meteorologist of the expedition.

=== Nelson Cliff ===
71°14′S 168°42′E. A prominent rock cliff at the west side of Simpson Glacier. First charted by the Northern Party, led by Victor Campbell, of the BrAE, 1910-13. Named for Edward W. Nelson, biologist of the expedition.

== Gallery ==
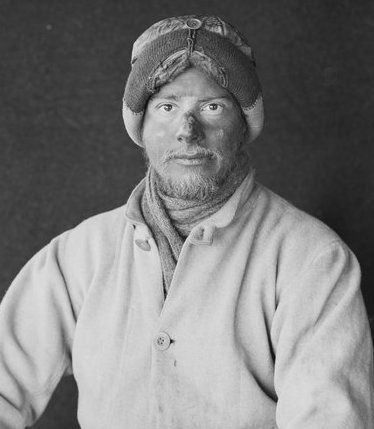
Apsley Cherry-Garrard in January 1912

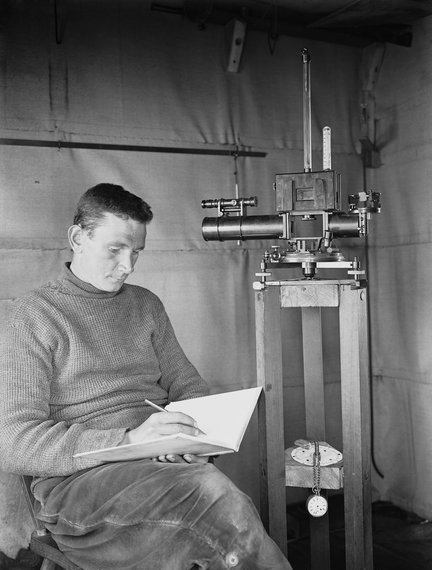
George Clarke Simpson in 1911

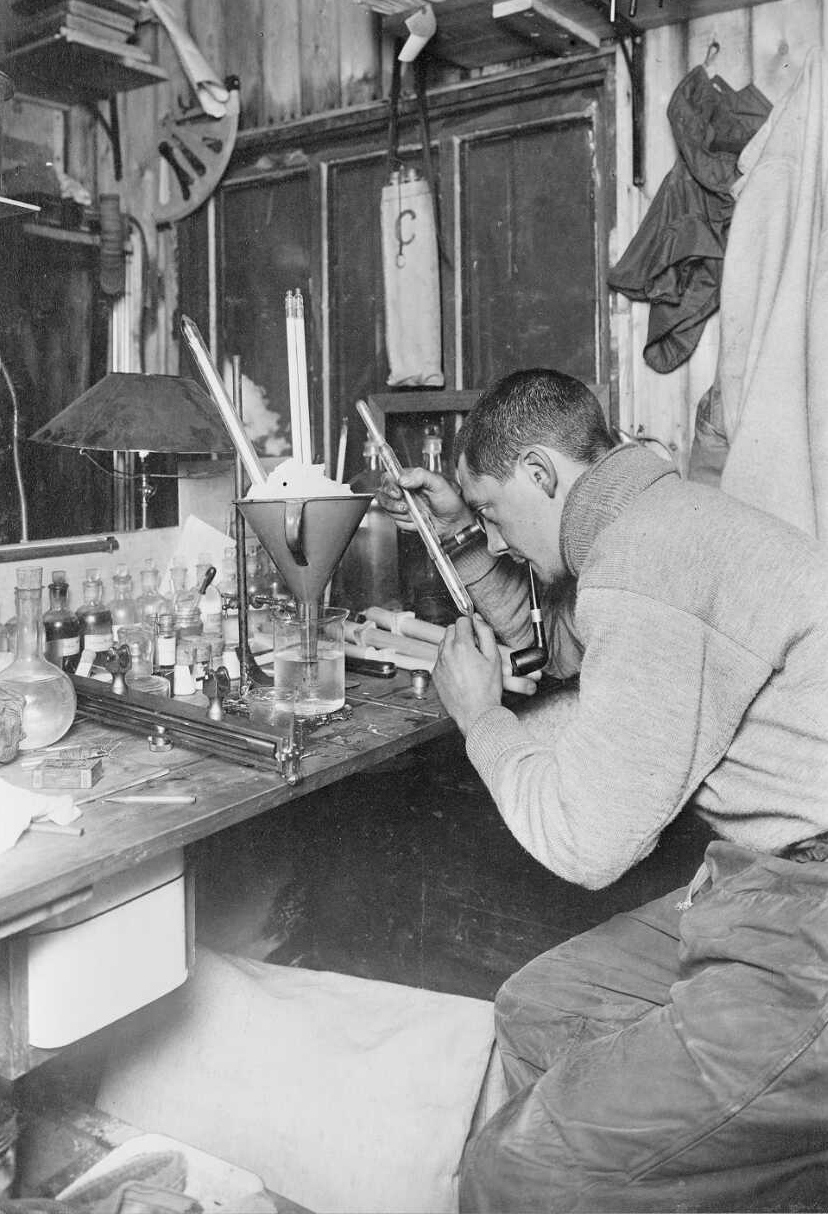
Edward W Nelson in 1911

== Sources ==
- Alberts, Fred G., ed. (1995), Geographic Names of the Antarctic (PDF) (2 ed.), United States Board on Geographic Names This article incorporates public domain material from websites or documents of the United States Board on Geographic Names.
- Cape Adare, USGS: United States Geographic Board

This article incorporates public domain material from websites or documents of the United States Geological Survey.
