= Edward Nelson (marine biologist) =

British marine biologist and explorer (1883–1923)

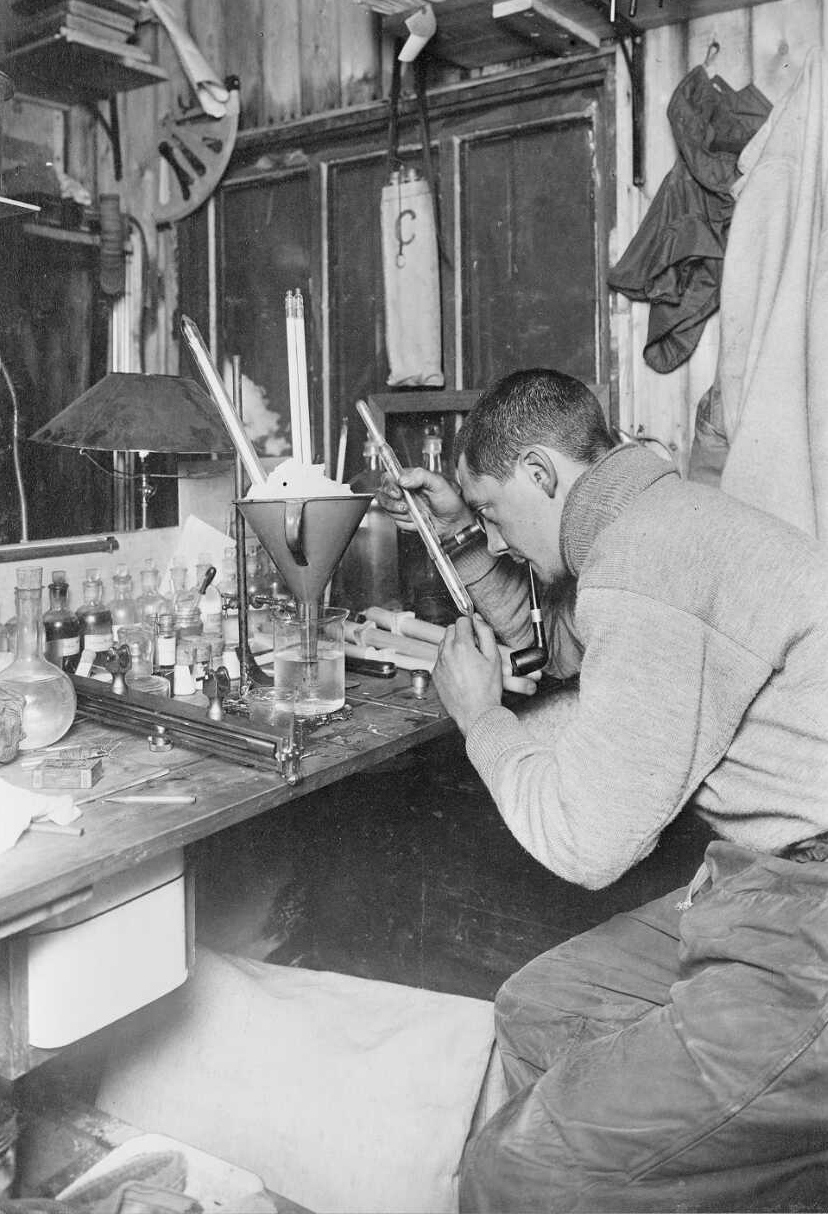
- Nelson testing thermometers during the Terra Nova Expedition in 1911
- Born: 6 June 1883
- Died: 17 January 1923 (aged 39)
- Education: Tonbridge School Cambridge University
- Occupations: Senior Naturalist, laboratory in Plymouth Scientific Superintendent, Fisheries Board for Scotland
- Known for: Marine Biology, Polar exploration

Edward William Nelson (6 June 1883– 17 January 1923) was a British marine biologist and polar explorer. Educated at Tonbridge School and Cambridge University, he was independently wealthy. He worked at the Marine Biological Association of the United Kingdom (MBA) in Plymouth and was member of the 1910–1913 British Antarctic Expedition. In association with E. J. Allen, he developed a simple method for culturing phytoplankton.

== Antarctic expedition ==
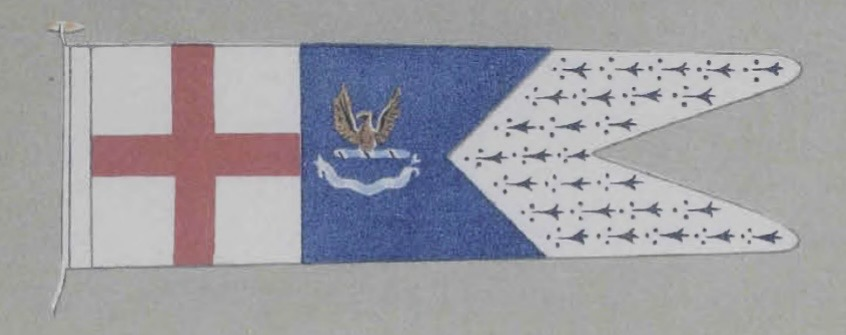
Sledge flag used by Nelson during the Terra Nova expedition

In 1910, he joined the British Antarctic Expedition (popularly known as "The Terra Nova Expedition") led by Robert Falcon Scott, and served, in the shore party, as one of two biologist, alongside Denis G. Lillie, chosen for the ship party.

He took part in a sledging journey to One Ton Depot, carrying food supplies for the returning polar party. He also conducted tidal observations while at Cape Evans and was later awarded the Polar Medal along with the other Terra Nova members.

He was commemorated with Nelson Cliff at the west side of the Simpson Glacier in Antarctica (71°14′S, 168°42′E).

== Later career ==
On his return from the Antarctic, Nelson worked as Senior Naturalist at the laboratory in Plymouth, taking leave to fight with the British 63rd (Royal Naval) Division in the Gallipoli campaign, then later in the trenches of France. In 1920 the Ministry of Agriculture, Fisheries and Food approached the MBA to propose that the Association undertake the manufacture of a large number of "Drift Bottles", to be used in tracking the movement of the waters of the North Sea. By this time, Nelson was the Scientific Superintendent of the Fisheries Board for Scotland, and wrote a paper on the manufacture of the drift bottles for the Association's Journal.

== Death ==
On 17 January 1923, two days after his wife was granted a restitution of conjugal rights in divorce court proceedings, Nelson was found dead in his laboratory as a result of a self-injected poison. An inquest into his death was reported in The Express and Telegraph newspaper, which was published on 1 March 1923.

Over 80 years later, his daughter Barbara, then 93, died during a trip to Antarctica in 2009.

== Literature ==
- Poulsom, Neville W.; Myres, John A. L. (2000). British polar exploration and research: a historical and medallic record with biographies, 1818-1999. London: Savannah. ISBN 978-1902366050.
- "Bergy Bits: The Newsletter of the Friends of the Antarctic", No. 28 April 2009
- Southward, A. J.; Roberts, E. K. (1984). "The Marine Biological Association 1884–1984: One Hundred Years of Marine Research" (PDF). Journal of the Marine Biological Association of the United Kingdom. 65 (1): 273. doi:10.1017/S0025315400060963.
- Stewart, John (2011). Antarctica – An Encyclopedia. London: McFarland & Co. ISBN 978-0786435906. Volume 2, page 1091.
