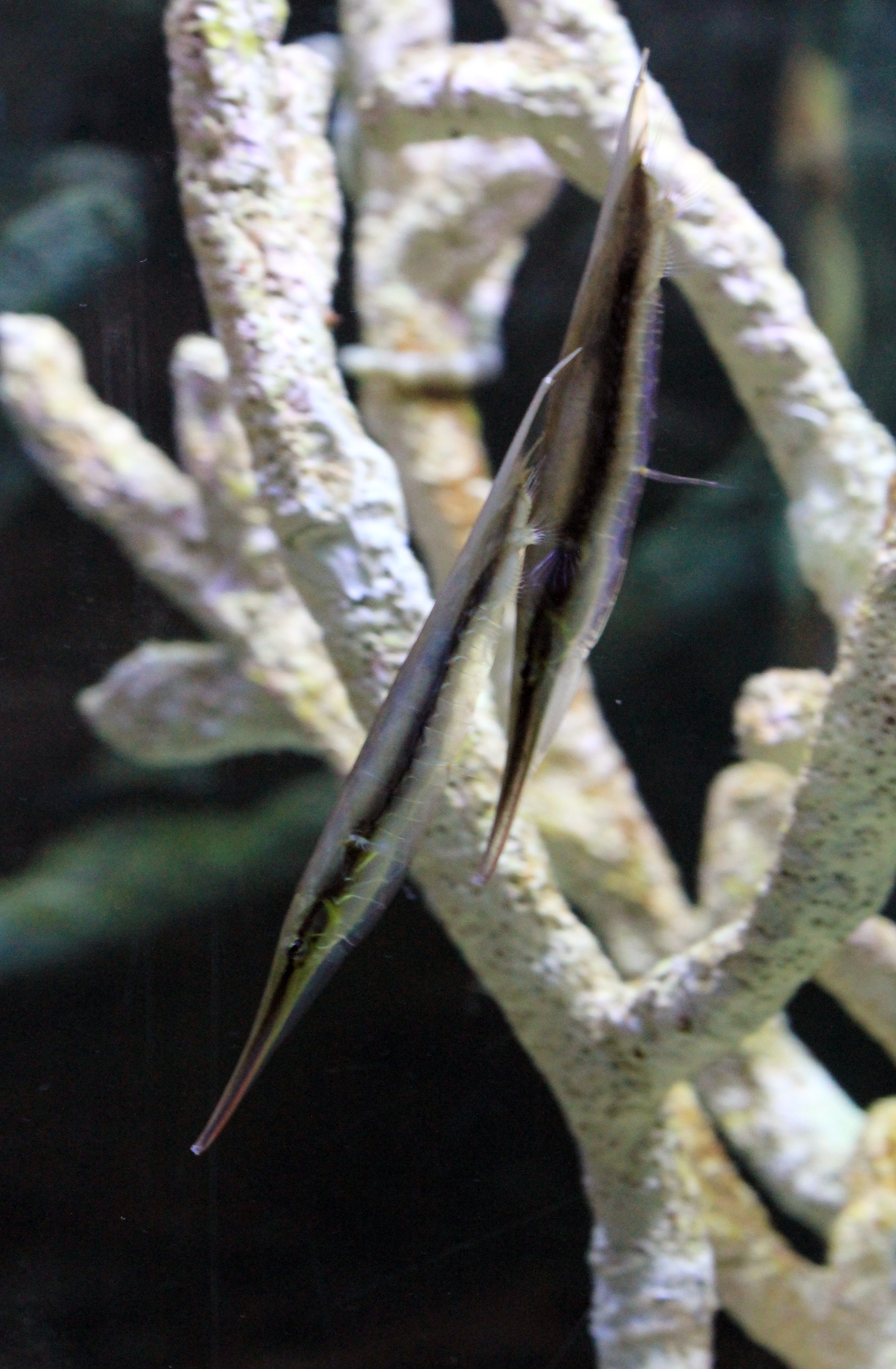
- Razorfish (A. strigatus)

Scientific classification
- Kingdom: Animalia
- Phylum: Chordata
- Class: Actinopterygii
- Division: Teleostei
- Order: Syngnathiformes
- Family: Centriscidae
- Subfamily: Centriscinae
- Genus: Aeoliscus; D. S. Jordan & Starks, 1902

Type species
- Amphisile strigata Günther, 1861

= Aeoliscus =

Aeoliscus Temporal range: Early Oligocene–present

Genus of fishes

Aeoliscus is a genus of shrimpfishes found in the Indian and Pacific Oceans.

== Species ==
There are currently two recognized extant species of Aeoliscus in this genus:

- Aeoliscus punctulatus (Bianconi, 1854) (speckled shrimpfish)
- Aeoliscus strigatus (Günther, 1861) (razorfish)

The following fossil species are also known:

- †Aeoliscus apscheronicus (Lednev, 1914) - Early Miocene of North Caucasus, Russia & Azerbaijan; Middle Miocene of Austria
- †Aeoliscus distinctus Parin & Micklich, 1996 - Early Oligocene of Germany
- †Aeoliscus heinrichi (Heckel, 1850) - Early Oligocene of France, Germany, Switzerland, Poland, Romania, Ukraine & Azerbaijan
- †Aeoliscus kabristanicus Menner, 1950 - Late Oligocene of Azerbaijan
- †Aeoliscus longispinus (Rozhdestvensky, 1949) - Late Oligocene of Poland & Ukraine
- †Aeoliscus teleajensis (Jonet, 1949) - Early Oligocene of Romania & Poland
