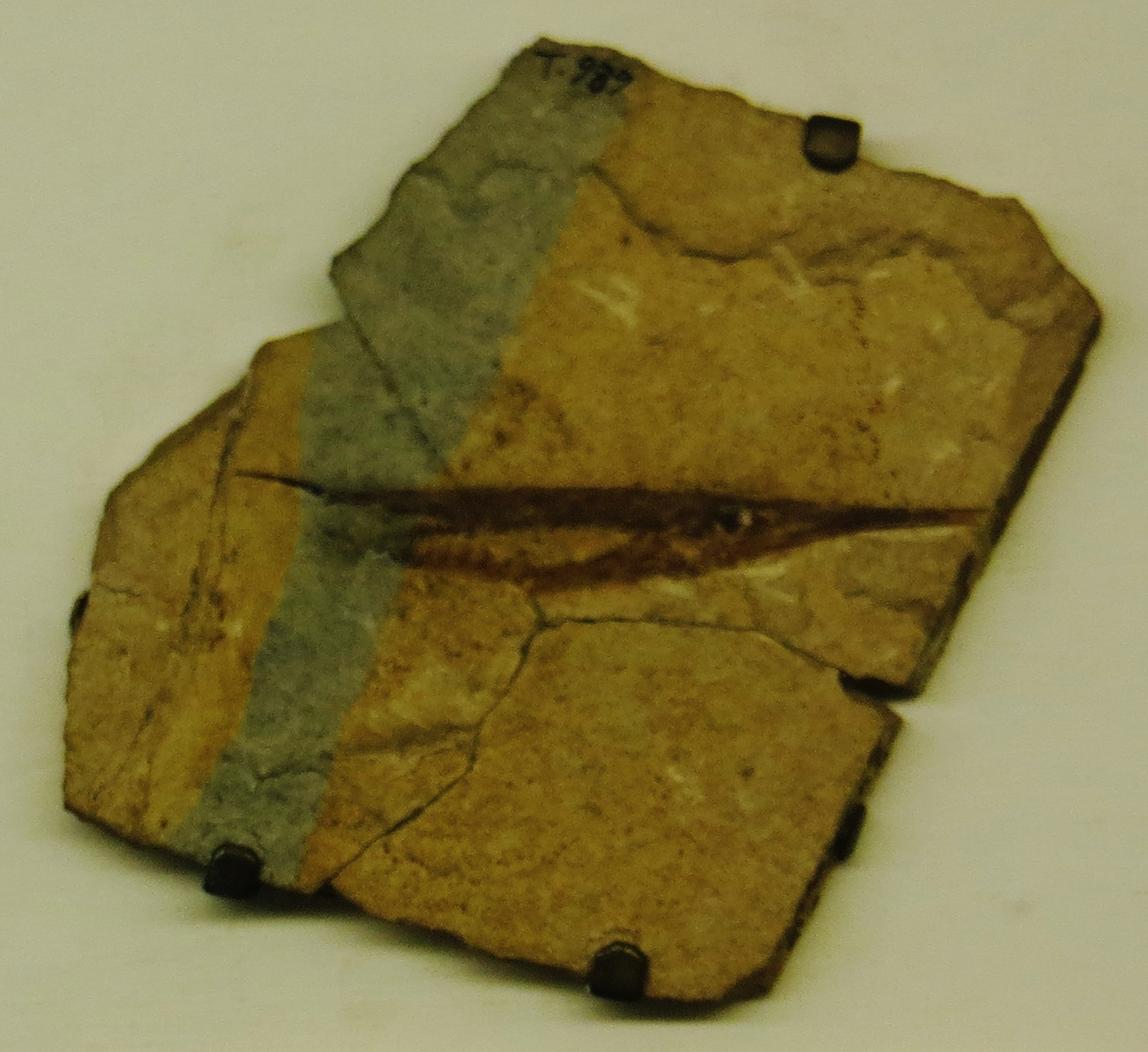
- Paramphisile weileri

Scientific classification
- Domain: Eukaryota
- Kingdom: Animalia
- Phylum: Chordata
- Class: Actinopterygii
- Order: Gasterosteiformes
- Genus: †Paramphisile; Blot 1981

= Paramphisile =

Paramphisile Temporal range: Early- Middle Eocene

Extinct genus of fishes

Paramphisile is an extinct genus of prehistoric bony fish that lived from the early to middle Eocene.
