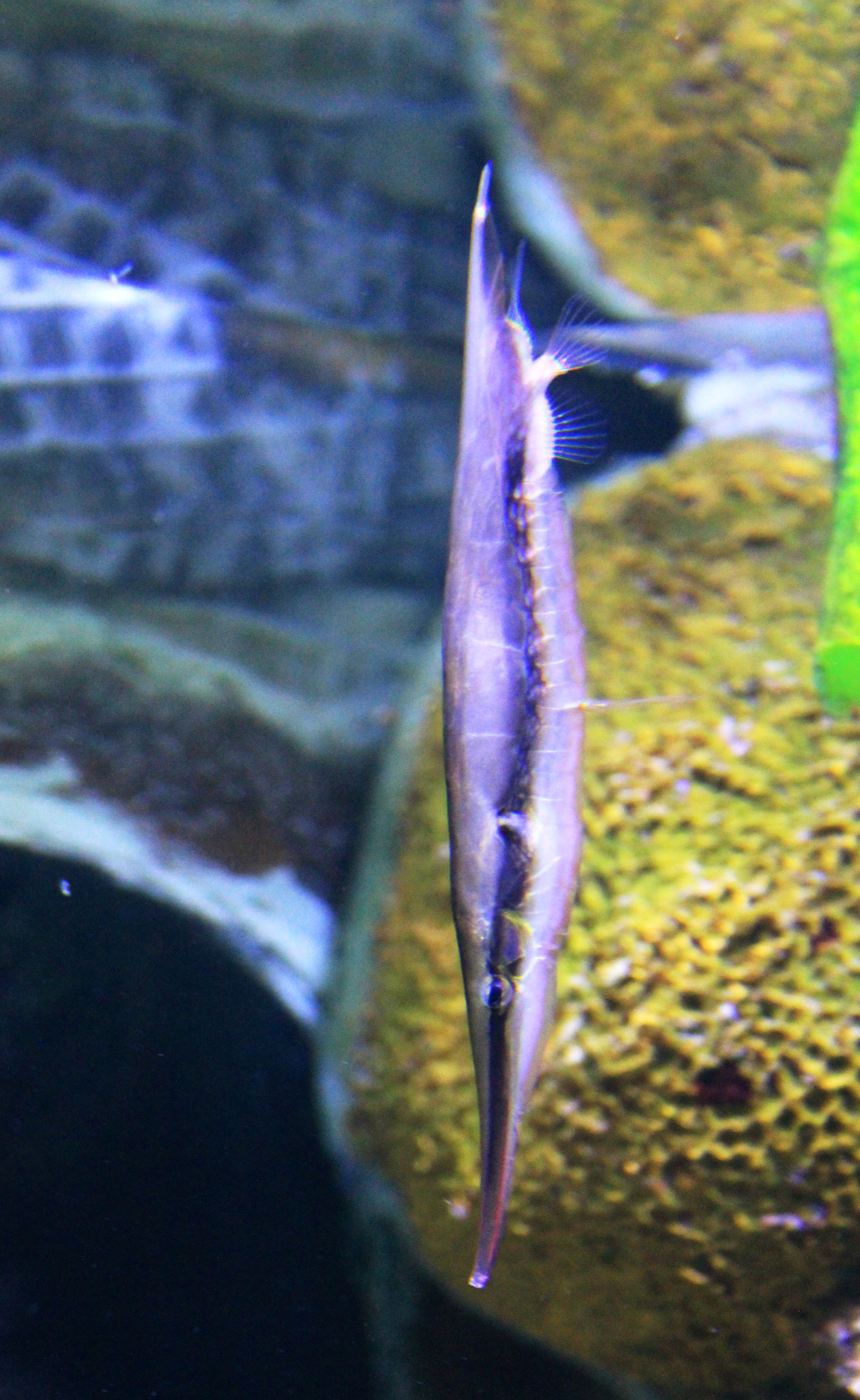

Conservation status
- Data Deficient (IUCN 3.1)

Scientific classification
- Kingdom: Animalia
- Phylum: Chordata
- Class: Actinopterygii
- Order: Syngnathiformes
- Family: Centriscidae
- Genus: Aeoliscus
- Species: A. strigatus

Binomial name
- Aeoliscus strigatus (Günther, 1861)

Synonyms
- Amphisile strigata Günther, 1861; Centriscus strigatus (Günther, 1861)

= Aeoliscus strigatus =

Species of fish

Aeoliscus strigatus, also known as the razorfish, jointed razorfish, shrimpfish or coral shrimpfish, is a member of the family Centriscidae of the order Syngnathiformes. This species of fish has an adaptation of staying in a head-down tail-up position for hiding among sea urchin spines. The razorfish is primarily found in coastal waters in the Indo-West Pacific. The natural habitat of the razorfish includes beds of sea grass and coral reefs, where sea urchins are found.

== Description ==
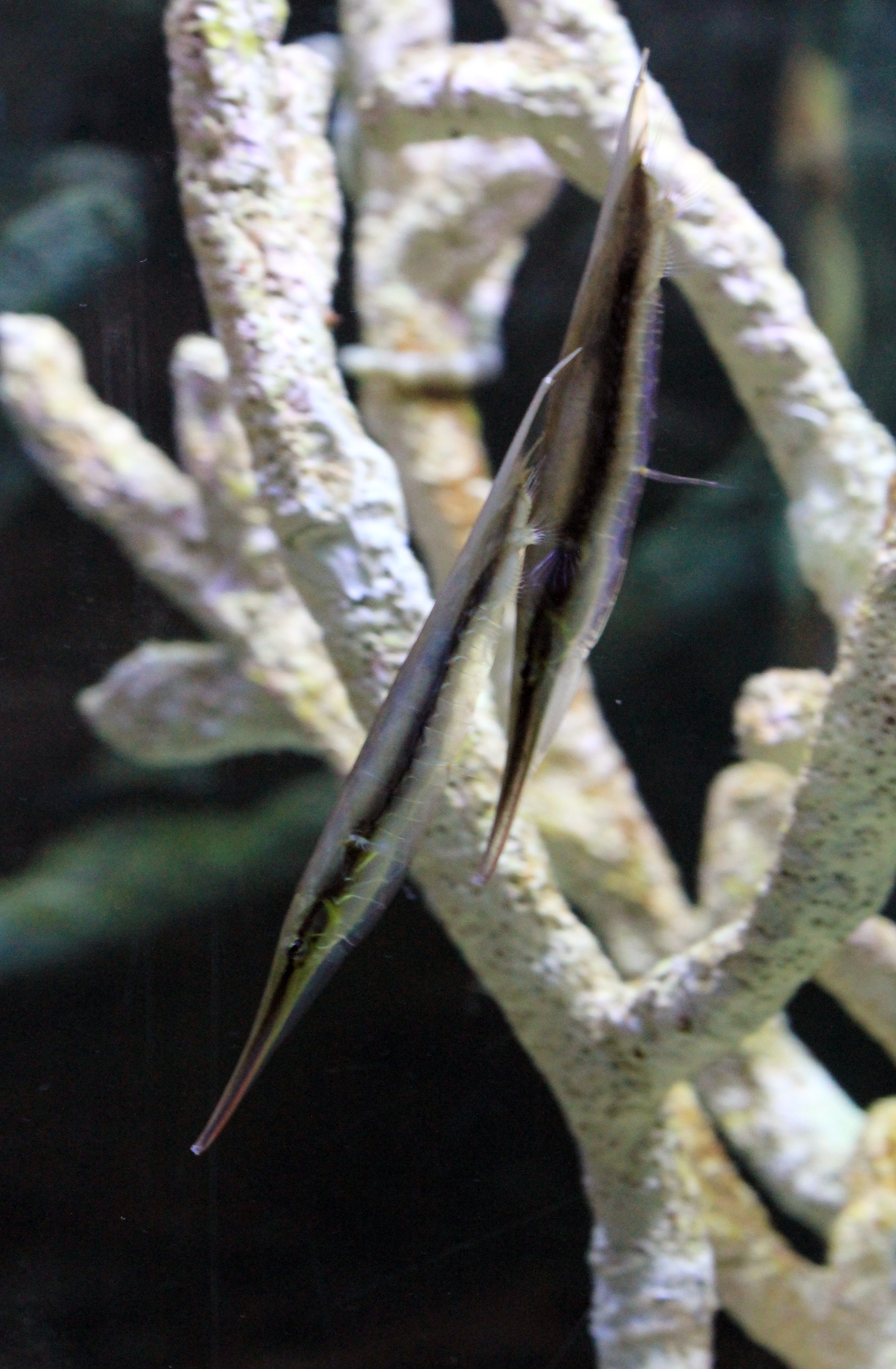
In Prague sea aquarium

The razorfish is recognized by the hinged part of its dorsal fin spine, as well as its way of moving in synchronised groups, head down. The razorfish can grow up to 15 cm (5.9 in) in length. Its body is elongated, ending in a fine, long "beak". Its fins are considerably reduced and transparent. The dorsal surface of the razorfish is covered by protective bony plates, which extend past the end of the body and over the tail fin, terminating in a sharp spine. A black or brown median band runs the length of the fish, also crossing the eyes. The color of the body is variable with the habitat. In seagrass environments, the body can be greenish-yellow with light brown stripes. In open areas like sand patches, rubble, or close to coral reefs, the body can be light silver with a black or brown stripe. There is no known sexual dimorphism.

== Ecology ==
The razorfish eats mainly small brine shrimp and other small invertebrates. They have also been known to eat minute crustaceans. In the wild they have been observed hiding in the spines of sea urchins, both as a defense mechanism and as a hunting mechanism. When threatened by larger fish, the razorfish darts away to a nearby sea urchin or staghorn coral for protection. Razorfish hunt among sea urchin spines, especially those of the genus Diadema, and wait for small invertebrates that feed on the urchins. When their prey gets close, the razorfish will dart out and try to catch them.

This species is oviparous and the eggs and larvae are pelagic, the juveniles settle when they attain 20 millimetres (0.79 in) in length, frequently choosing to live among the spines of Diadema sea urchins.

The razorfish is primarily found in the Indo-West Pacific, with most common sightings being in the area of East Africa to Australia and southern Japan, as well as the vicinity of the Caroline Islands. The razorfish does not inhabit the Red Sea, however. The lowest recorded depth of encounter is 42 m (138 ft).
