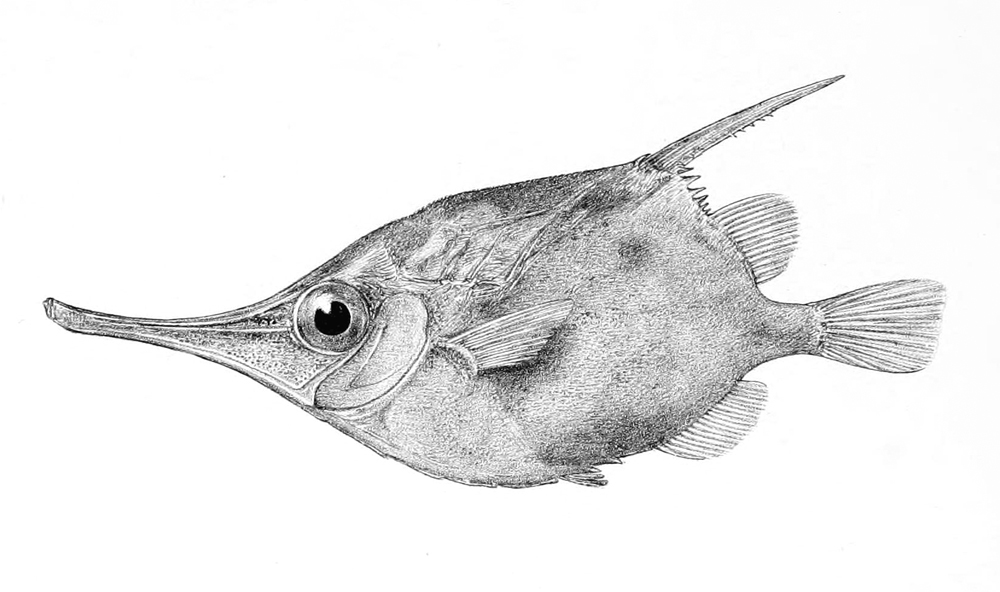
- Notopogon lilliei

Scientific classification
- Kingdom: Animalia
- Phylum: Chordata
- Class: Actinopterygii
- Division: Teleostei
- Order: Syngnathiformes
- Family: Centriscidae
- Subfamily: Macroramphosinae
- Genus: Notopogon; Regan, 1914

Type species
- Notopogon lilliei Regan 1914

Species
- See text

Synonyms
- Scolopacichthys Regan, 1914

= Notopogon =

Genus of fishes

The bellowfishes or bellowsfishes are fishes in the genus Notopogon in the family Centriscidae. They are found in deeper parts of the temperate southern oceans, although the longspine bellowfish has been recorded as far north as New Caledonia and Madagascar. According to FishBase, they are part of the family Centriscidae, but some authorities split that family, in which case the genus Notopogon is in the family Macroramphosidae, which is followed here. They have long second spines on their dorsal fins and tiny mouths at the tip of their greatly elongated snouts. Their bodies are relatively high (giving them a somewhat hunchbacked appearance), unlike the related snipefishes. They reach a maximum length of about 34 cm (13 in), and are silvery or reddish in colour.

== Species ==
The currently recognized species in this genus are:

- Notopogon armatus (Sauvage, 1879)
- Notopogon fernandezianus (Delfín, 1899) (orange bellowsfish)
- Notopogon lilliei Regan, 1914 (crested bellowsfish)
- Notopogon macrosolen Barnard, 1925 (longsnout bellowsfish)
- Notopogon xenosoma Regan, 1914 (longspine bellowsfish)
