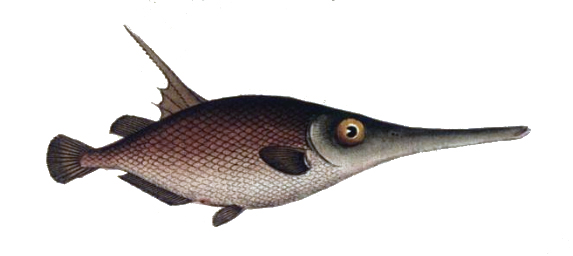
- Macroramphosus scolopax

Scientific classification
- Kingdom: Animalia
- Phylum: Chordata
- Class: Actinopterygii
- Division: Teleostei
- Order: Syngnathiformes
- Suborder: Syngnathoidei
- Superfamily: Centriscoidea
- Family: Centriscidae
- Subfamily: Macroramphosinae; Bleeker, 1879

= Macroramphosinae =

Family of fishes

Macroramphosinae, the snipefishes and bellowsfishes is a subfamily of oviparous, marine fish which form part of the superfamily Centriscoidea, which is one of the three superfamilies in the suborder Syngnathoidei of the order Syngnathiformes, which includes the seahorses, pipefishes, trumpetfishes and dragonets.

It has been considered to be a subfamily of the Centriscidae but Nelson (2016) classified it as a family. However, Eschmeyer's Catalog of Fishes (2025) has returned to treating it as a subfamily.

== Genera ==
There are currently eight recognized extant species in three genera which are placed in the Macroramphosidae:

- Centriscops Gill, 1862
- Macroramphosus Lacépède, 1803
- Notopogon Regan, 1914

== Fossil record ==
The earliest known syngnathiform is a species of Macroramphosidae, Gasteroramphosus zuppichini from the late Cretaceous, which is similar in form to Marcroramphosus but which has some characters which are suggestive of a relation to Gasterosteoidei.
