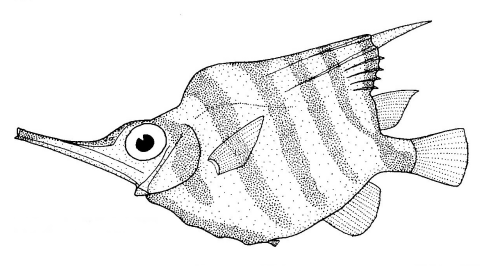
- Drawing by Dr. Tony Ayling

Conservation status
- Least Concern (IUCN 3.1)

Scientific classification
- Kingdom: Animalia
- Phylum: Chordata
- Class: Actinopterygii
- Division: Teleostei
- Order: Syngnathiformes
- Family: Centriscidae
- Genus: Centriscops; Gill, 1862
- Species: C. humerosus

Binomial name
- Centriscops humerosus (Richardson, 1846)

Synonyms
- Centriscus humerosus Richardson, 1846; Centriscops obliquus Waite, 1911

= Banded bellowsfish =

Species of fish

The banded bellowsfish (Centriscops humerosus), banded yellowfish, banded snipefish, or bluebanded bellowsfish, is a species of fish of the family Centriscidae, found in southern oceans at depths of 35 to 1,000 m (115 to 3,281 ft). Its length is up to 30 cm (12 in).

== Description ==
The banded bellowsfish has a very deep, nearly round, highly compressed body, with a depth which is equivalent to 38–62% of its standard length. Its upper and lower body profiles are asymmetrical, as the nape of small specimens has an angular hump which becomes more angular and obvious as the fish grows into an adult. It has a long, tube-like snout, which is between a quarter and a third of the standard length. The spines of the dorsal fin are set into another hump on the posterior part of the fish's back, and the second dorsal fin is large, equivalent to just under half of the standard length. The pelvic fins are rather small. There are four well-developed bony plates located along the shoulder region, and the scales are modified into a coarse, teethlike form covering most of the body and head. The fish are predominantly whitish in colour with as many as five oblique orange bands with dark margins, although these bands lack dark margins in the largest adults. The ends of the dorsal, anal and caudal fins have a dusky to orange colour. The juveniles are bluish grey and have transparent fins and no bands. Juvenile banded bellowsfish were thought to be a separate species because of their very different appearance.

== Distribution ==
The banded bellowsfish has a discontinuous, circumpolar distribution in the temperate waters of the Southern Hemisphere. In the southeastern Atlantic Ocean, it is found along the coast of South Africa from Cape Columbine to False Bay. The species has also been recorded in waters around Tristan da Cunha and Gough Island. In the southwestern Atlantic, it is found off southern Brazil, Uruguay and Argentina. In the southwest Pacific Ocean, these fish can be found in the coastal waters of Australia and New Zealand. In the southern Indian Ocean, it has been reported from Île Saint-Paul to Île Amsterdam.

== Habitat and biology ==
The banded bellowsfish is a bathydemersal species of the continental shelf and the continental slope, found at depths of 350–1,000 metres (1,150–3,280 ft), although this range is restricted to between 300 metres (980 ft) and 700 metres (2,300 ft) off Australia. Unlike the seashorses and pipefishes, this species is oviparous, laying eggs which develop and hatch outside the body. It is carnivorous and preys on epibenthic invertebrates. Off Tasmania, it was found to prey mainly on benthic crustaceans and brittle stars, with the brittle stars making up most of the fish's diet, but it was also found to eat Hector's lanternfish (Lampanyctodes hectoris). It has been recorded in the stomach contents of New Zealand smooth skates (Dipterus innominatus) sampled along the Chatham Rise.
