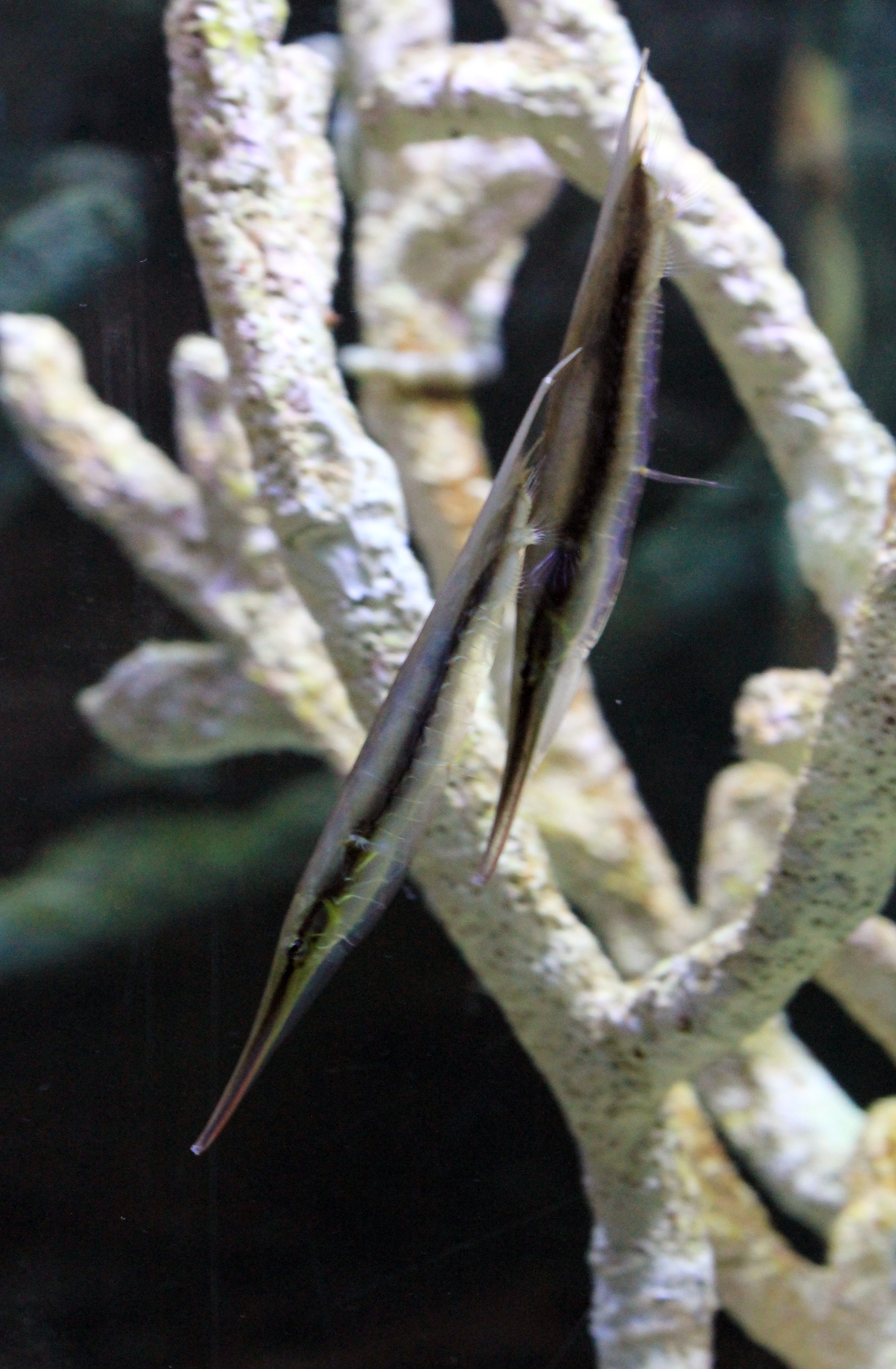
- Razorfish, Aeoliscus strigatus

Scientific classification
- Kingdom: Animalia
- Phylum: Chordata
- Class: Actinopterygii
- Division: Teleostei
- Order: Syngnathiformes
- Suborder: Syngnathoidei
- Superfamily: Centriscoidea
- Family: Centriscidae; Bonaparte, 1831

Genera
- see text

= Centriscidae =

Centriscidae Temporal range: Ypresian to recent

Family of fishes

The Centriscidae are a family of fishes from the order Syngnathiformes which includes the snipefishes, shrimpfishes, and bellowfishes. A small family, consisting of only about over a dozen marine species in two subfamilies, they are of an unusual appearance, as reflected by their common names. Shrimpfish are restricted to relatively shallow, tropical parts of the Indo-Pacific, while snipefish and bellowfish are found in temperate and deeper tropical waters worldwide.

== Description ==
They have extremely compressed, razor-like bodies which have a sharp ventral edge and a dorsal surface which is nearly straight in profile ending in a long snout which has a tiny mouth with pincer-like jaws which lack teeth. The spiny part of the dorsal fin is located close to the tail and is made of one long, sharp spine at the anterior end with two shorter spines behind that. The soft, posterior part of the dorsal fin and the caudal fin are situated on the ventral surface and lie below the posterior-most part of the body, which is pointed. The pelvic fins are small and are located around the middle of its body while the pectoral fins are larger. The body is almost completely covered in thin, translucent bony plates which are created by expansion of its vertebrae. The species within this family do not have a lateral line. These fish tend to swim with their heads pointed towards the substrate, although why they do this is unclear. Some species occur within beds of sea grass while other species are reef fishes. They are predators of zooplankton.

== Taxonomy ==
In some classifications, the subfamily Macroramphosinae is raised to the level of family, Macroramphosidae. The placement of the genus Centriscops is unclear: ITIS places it in Macroramphosidae, as does the 5th edition of Nelson (2016). However, Eschmeyer's Catalog of Fishes presently retains both as different subfamilies within the same family.

The five genera currently classified within the Centriscidae are:

- Family Centriscidae
  - Subfamily Centriscinae Bonaparte, 1831
    - Aeoliscus Jordan & Starks, 1902
    - Centriscus Linnaeus, 1758
  - Subfamily Macroramphosinae Bleeker, 1879
    - Centriscops Gill, 1862
    - Macroramphosus Lacépède, 1803
    - Notopogon Regan, 1914

The following fossil genera are also known:

- †Aeoliscoides Blot, 1980
- †Amphisile Cuvier, 1816
- †Paramphisile Blot, 1980
