= Paleobiota of Monte Bolca =

The Eocene-aged Monte Bolca fossil site near Verona, Italy was one of the first lagerstatte to be discovered to science, and still has one of the most prominent vertebrate faunas of all Cenozoic lagerstatte. It has the highest fish diversity of all known Cenozoic fossil sites, with many fossils having extremely detailed preservation. In addition, a very high diversity of marine invertebrates & land plants and a small number of land vertebrates are also known.

The Monte Bolca complex comprises two major marine limestone localities, the Pesciara (where fossils are found in caves) and the Monte Postale site (where fossils are directly quarried). The Pesciara is thought to represent a marine structural basin dominated by planktivorous fish, with an anoxic environment at the bottom that led to excellent preservation of fossils. Meanwhile, the Monte Postale site is thought to represent a turbid coastal area surrounded by mangroves, seagrass meadows, and coral reefs, with poorer fossil preservation. In addition, a few small, slightly younger lignitic sites that preserve a Messel Formation-esque freshwater or brackish habitat are known nearby, which are the Purga di Bolca and Vegroni sites. These sites preserve terrestrial reptiles, freshwater plants, and freshwater/terrestrial mollusks, which are otherwise rare to absent from the complex.

== Cartilaginous fishes ==
Based on Marrama et al, 2021:

=== Chimaeras ===
Chimaeras reported from Monte Bolca
Genus	Species	Presence	Notes	Images
Ischyodus	I. sp.	Monte Postale	A relative of plough-nosed chimaeras, known from a single dorsal spine.	I. quenstedti, a related species

=== Sharks ===
Sharks reported from Monte Bolca
Genus	Species	Presence	Notes	Images
Brachycarcharias	B. lerichei	Pesciara	A sand shark.	
Eogaleus	E. bolcensis	Pesciara & Monte Postale	A requiem shark.	
Galeorhinus	G. cuvieri	Pesciara & Monte Postale	A relative of the school shark.	

An alleged specimen from Bolca of the otherwise Cretaceous shark Mesiteia emiliae has been found to actually originate from the Sannine Formation of Lebanon.

=== Rays ===
Chondrichthyans reported from Monte Bolca
Genus	Species	Presence	Notes	Images
Arechia	A. crassicaudata	Monte Postale	A stingaree.	
Dasyomyliobatis	D. thomyorkei	Pesciara	A dasyomyliobatid stingray.	
Eoplatyrhina	E. bolcensis	Monte Postale	A thornback ray.	
Eorhinobatos	E. primaevus	Pesciara	A guitarfish.	
Lessiniabatis	L. aenigmatica	Pesciara	A bizarre stingray of uncertain affinities.	
Plesiozanobatus	P. egertoni	Pesciara	A relative of panrays.	
Promyliobatis	P. gazolai	Pesciara	A potential eagle ray.	
Pseudorhinobatos	P. dezignii	Monte Postale	A guitarfish.	
Tethytrygon	T. muricatus	Pesciara	A whiptail stingray.	
Titanonarke	T. megapterygia	Monte Postale	An electric ray.	
Titanonarke	T. molini	Monte Postale	An electric ray.	

== Ray-finned fishes ==
Primarily based on Papazzoni et al. 2014, with more recent taxa also added. Taxonomic order and arrangement based on Eschmeyer's Catalog of Fishes (2025):

=== Pycnodontiformes ===
Genus	Species	Presence	Notes	Images
Abdobalistum	A. thyrsus		A nursalliine pycnodont.	
Nursallia	N. veronae		A nursalliine pycnodont.	
Palaeobalistum	P. orbiculatum		A nursalliine pycnodont.	P. goedeli, a related species
Pycnodus	P. apodus		A pycnodontine pycnodont.	

=== Crossognathiformes ===
Genus	Species	Presence	Notes	Images
Platinx	P. macropterus		A pachyrhizodontid, the last crossognathiform.	

=== Osteoglossiformes ===
Genus	Species	Presence	Notes	Images
Foreyichthys	F. bolcensis		A bonytongue.	
Monopteros	M. gigas		A bonytongue.	
Thrissopterus	T. catullii		A bonytongue, related to the arapaima.	

=== Anguilliformes ===
Genus	Species	Presence	Notes	Images
Anguilloides	A. branchiostegalis		An angulloidid eel.	
Bolcanguilla	B. brachycephala		An eel of uncertain affinities	
Bolcyrus	B. bajai		A conger eel.	
Bolcyrus	B. formosissimus		A conger eel.	
Dalpiazella	D. brevicauda		A paranguillid eel.	
Eoanguilla	E. leptoptera		An anguillid eel.	
Gazolapodus	G. homopterus		An eel of uncertain affinities.	
Goslinophis	G. acuticaudus		A snake-eel.	
Milananguilla	M. lehmani		A milananguillid eel.	
Paracongroides	P. heckeli		A conger eel.	
Paranguilla	P. tigrina		A paranguillid eel.	
Patavichthys	P. bolcensis		A patavichthyid eel.	
Proteomyrus	P. ventralis		A proteomyrid eel.	
Voltaconger	V. latispinus		A conger eel.	
Whitapodus	W. breviculus		A false moray.	

=== Clupeiformes ===
Genus	Species	Presence	Notes	Images
Bolcaichthys	B. catopygopterus	Pesciara & Monte Postale	A true herring. The most common fish of the formation.	
Eoalosa	E. janvieri	Pesciara	A shad.	
Eoengraulis	E. fasoloi	Pesciara	An anchovy.	
Trollichthys	T. bolcensis	Pesciara	A round herring.	

=== Ellimmichthyiformes ===
Genus	Species	Presence	Notes	Images
Eoellimmichthys	E. superstes	Pesciara	A paraclupeid, the last marine ellimmichthyiform.	

=== Gonorynchiformes ===
Genus	Species	Presence	Notes	Images
Chanos	C. forcipatus		A milkfish.	C. chanos, a related species
Coelogaster	C. leptostea		A relative of the milkfish.	

=== Otophysi ===
Genus	Species	Presence	Notes	Images
Chanoides	C. macropoma		A stem-otophysan.	

=== Aulopiformes ===
Genus	Species	Presence	Notes	Images
Holosteus	H. esocinus		A barracudina.	

=== Lampriformes ===
Genus	Species	Presence	Notes	Images
Veronavelifer	V. sorbinii		A sailfin velifer.	
Wettonius	W. angeloi		A sailfin velifer. (=Velifer carosii)	

=== Zeiformes ===
Genus	Species	Presence	Notes	Images
Bajaichthys	B. elegans		A zeiform (initially considered a lamprimorph)	

=== Holocentriformes ===
Genus	Species	Presence	Notes	Images
Berybolcensis	B. leptacanthus		A basal holocentrid.	
Eoholocentrum	E. macrocephalum		A soldierfish.	
Tenuicentrum	T. lanceolatum		A basal holocentrid.	

=== Ophidiiformes ===
Genus	Species	Presence	Notes	Images
"Ophidium"	"O." voltianum		A cusk-eel.	

=== Gobiiformes ===
Genus	Species	Presence	Notes	Images
Apogoniscus	A. pauciradiatus		A cardinalfish.	
Bolcapogon	B. johnsoni		A cardinalfish.	
Carlomonnius	C. carnevalei		A gobioid, potentially a member of the Butidae.	
Carlomonnius	C. quasigobius		A gobioid, potentially a member of the Butidae.	
Eoapogon	E. fraseri		A cardinalfish.	
Eosphaeramia	E. pygopterus		A cardinalfish.	
Leptolumamia	L. vetula	Monte Postale	A cardinalfish.	

=== Blenniiformes ===
Genus	Species	Presence	Notes	Images
Chiarachromis	C. salazzarii		A damselfish.	
Lorenzichthys	L. olihan		A damselfish.	
Palaeopomacentrus	P. orphae		A damselfish.	
Sorbinichromis	S. francescoi		A damselfish.	

=== Atheriniformes ===
Genus	Species	Presence	Notes	Images
"Atherina"	"A." macrocephala		An Old World silverside.	
Latellagnathus	L. teruzzii		A mesogasterid.	
Mesogaster	M. sphyraenoides		A mesogasterid.	
Rhamphognathus	R. paralepoides		A rhamphognathid.	

=== Beloniformes ===
Genus	Species	Presence	Notes	Images
"Engraulis"	E. evolans		A flying fish.	
Hemiramphus	H. edwardsi		A halfbeak.	
Rhamphexocoetus	R. volans		A flying fish.	

=== Carangiformes ===
Genus	Species	Presence	Notes	Images
Amphistium	A. paradoxum	Pesciara	An amphistiid flatfish.	
Blochius	B. longirostris	A blochiid billfish.		
Blochius	B. macropterus	A blochiid billfish.		
Ceratoichthys	C. pinnatiformis		A bizarre carangid.	
Ductor	D. vesternae		A ductorid.	
Eastmanalepes	E. primaevus		A carangid.	
Eobothus	E. minutus	Pesciara	A flatfish of uncertain affinities.	
Eolates	E. gracilis		A lates perch.	
Heteronectes	H. chaneti	Monte Postale	A potentially amphistiid flatfish.	
Lichia	L. veronensis		A relative of the leerfish.	
Mene	M. oblonga		A moonfish.	
Mene	M. rhombea		A moonfish.	
Palaeorhynchus	P. zorzini		A palaeorhynchid billfish.	
Paratrachinotus	P. tenuiceps		A carangid.	
Seriola	S. prisca		A relative of amberjacks.	
Sphyraena	S. bolcensis		A barracuda.	
Trachicaranx	T. pleuronectiformis		A carangid.	
Vomeropsis	V. triurus		A carangid.	

=== Syngnathiformes ===
Genus	Species	Presence	Notes	Images
Aeoliscoides	A. longirostris		A shrimpfish.	
Aulorhamphus	A. bolcensis		An aulorhamphid.	
Aulorhamphus	A. capellinii		An aulorhamphid.	
Aulorhamphus	A. chiarasorbiniae		An aulorhamphid.	
Aulostomoides	A. tyleri		An indeterminate aulostomoid.	
Calamostoma	C. breviculum		A relative of the ghost pipefish.	
Eoaulostomus	E. bolcensis		A relative of the trumpetfish.	
Eoaulostomus	E. gracilis		A relative of the trumpetfish.	
Fistularioides	F. phyllolepis		A fistularioidid.	
Fistularioides	F. veronensis		A fistularioidid.	
Gilmourella	G. minuta	Pesciara	A callonymoid.	
Jungersenichthys	J. elongatus		A relative of the trumpetfish.	
Macraulostomus	M. veronensis		A relative of the trumpetfish.	
Paraeoliscus	P. robinetae		A paraeoliscid.	
Paramphisile	P. weleri		A shrimpfish.	
Parasynarcualis	P. longirostris		A parasynarcualid.	
Pesciarhamphus	P. carnevalei		An aulorhamphid.	
Prosolenostomus	P. lessinii		A pipefish.	
Pseudosyngnathus	P. opisthopterus		A fistularioidid.	
Pterygocephalus	P. paradoxus		A relative of the flying gurnards.	
Rhamphosus	R. biserratus	Pesciara	A rhamphosid.	
Rhamphosus	R. bloti	Pesciara	A rhamphosid.	
Rhamphosus	R. brevirostris	Pesciara	A rhamphosid.	
Rhamphosus	R. longispinatus	Pesciara	A rhamphosid.	
Rhamphosus	R. rastrum	Pesciara	A rhamphosid.	
Rhamphosus	R. tubulirostris	Pesciara	A rhamphosid.	
Solenorhynchus	S. elegans		A relative of the ghost pipefish.	
"Syngnathus"	"S." bolcensis		A pipefish.	
"Syngnathus"	"S." heckeli		A pipefish.	
Synhypuralis	S. banisteri		A relative of the trumpetfish.	
Synhypuralis	S. jungerseni		A relative of the trumpetfish.	
Tyleria	T. necopinata		A relative of the trumpetfish.	
Urosphen	U. dubius		A urosphenid.	
Veronarhamphus	V. canossae		An aulorhamphid.	

=== Scombriformes ===
Genus	Species	Presence	Notes	Images
Auxides	A. propterygius		A scombrid.	
Carangopsis	C. brevis		A relative of bluefish.	
Carangopsis	C. dorsalis		A relative of bluefish.	
Godsilia	G. lanceolata		A scombrid.	
Pseudauxides	P. speciosus		A scombrid.	]
Thunnoscomberoides	T. bolcensis		A scombrid.	
Veronaphleges	V. brunae		A euzaphlegid.	]
Zorzinia	Z. postalensis	Monte Postale	A medusafish.	

=== Labriformes ===
Genus	Species	Presence	Notes	Images
Bellwoodilabrus	B. landinii		A wrasse.	
Eocoris	E. bloti		A wrasse.	
"Labrus"	"L." merula (="L." valenciennesi)		A labroid of uncertain affinities.	
Labrobolcus	L. giorgioi	Pesciara	A wrasse.	
Paralabrus	P. rossiae	Pesciara	A presumed wrasse.	
Phyllopharyngodon	P. longipinnis		A wrasse related to hogfish and tuskfishes.	
Sorbinia	S. caudopunctata		A labroid of uncertain affinities.	
Zorzinilabrus	Z. furcatus	Pesciara	A wrasse.	

=== Perciformes ===
Genus	Species	Presence	Notes	Images
Scorpaenoidei indet.		Monte Postale	A scorpionfish of uncertain affinities.	

=== Acropomatiformes ===
Genus	Species	Presence	Notes	Images
Acropoma	A. lepidotum		A lanternbelly.	

=== Acanthuriformes ===
Genus	Species	Presence	Notes	Images
Abromasta	A. microdon		A seabream.	
Acanthonemus	A. subaureus		An acanthonemid.	
Acanthopygaeus	A. agassizi		A relative of rabbitfish.	
Aspesiganus	A. margaritae		A relative of rabbitfish.	
Aspesiperca	A. ruffoi		Possibly a mojarra.	
Acanthuroides	A. massalongoi		A surgeonfish.	
Angiolinia	A. mirabilis	Pesciara	A zanclid.	
Archaephippus	A. asper		A spadefish.	
"Dentex"	"D." microdon		A seabream, "D." ventralis is a nomen dubium.	
"Dentex"	"D." ventralis		A seabream, "D." ventralis is a nomen dubium.	
Ellaserrata	E. monksi		A seabream.	
Eoantigonia	E. veronensis		A boarfish.	
Eoplatax	E. papilio		A spadefish.	
Eoleiognathus	E. dorsalis		A ponyfish.	
Eorandallius	E. elegans		A surgeonfish.	
Eorandallius	E. rectifrons		A surgeonfish.	
Eoscatophagus	E. frontalis		A scat.	
Eozanclus	E. brevirostris		A zanclid.	
Frigosorbinia	F. baldwinae		A surgeonfish.	
Gazolaichthys	G. vestenanovae		A surgeonfish.	
Goujetia	G. crassispina		A snapper.	
Lehmanichthys	L. lessiniensis		A surgeonfish.	
Lessinia	L. horrenda		A snapper.	
Lessinia	L. sp.		A snapper.	
Massalongius	M. gazolai		A massalongiid.	
Metacanthurus	M. veronensis		A surgeonfish.	
Metaspisurus	M. emmanueli		A surgeonfish.	
Ottaviania	O. leptacanthus		A snapper.	
Ottaviania	O. mariae		A snapper.	
Padovathurus	P. gaudryi		A surgeonfish.	
Pesciarichthys	P. punctatus		A surgeonfish.	
Proacanthurus	P. bonatoi		A surgeonfish.	
Proacanthurus	P. elongatus		A surgeonfish.	
Proacanthurus	P. ovalis		A surgeonfish.	
Proacanthurus	P. tenuis		A surgeonfish.	
Pristigenys	P. substriatus		A bigeye.	
Protozebrasoma	P. bloti		A surgeonfish.	
Pseudosparnodus	P. microstomus		A seabream.	
Psettopsis	P. subarcuatus		A moonyfish.	
Ruffoichthys	R. bannikovi		A relative of rabbitfish.	
Ruffoichthys	R. spinosus		A relative of rabbitfish.	
Sorbinithurus	S. sorbinii		A surgeonfish.	
Sparnodus	S. elongatus		A seabream.	
Sparnodus	S. vulgaris		A seabream.	
Tauichthys	T. aspesae		A surgeonfish.	
Tauichthys	T. padremenini		A surgeonfish.	
Tylerichthys	T. milani		A surgeonfish.	
Tylerichthys	T. nuchalis		A surgeonfish.	
Veranichthys	V. ventralis		A snapper.	
Zaiaichthys	Z. postalensis		A moonyfish.	
Zaiaichthys	Z. wattersi		A moonyfish.	

=== Lophiiformes ===
Genus	Species	Presence	Notes	Images
Caruso	C. brachysomus		A goosefish.	
Eophryne	E. barbutii		A frogfish.	
Histionotophorus	H. bassanii		A handfish.	
Neilpeartia	N. ceratoi	Pesciara	A frogfish.	
Orrichthys	O. longimanus		A handfish.	
Sharfia	S. mirabilis		A goosefish.	
Tarkus	T. squirei		A batfish.	

=== Tetraodontiformes ===
Genus	Species	Presence	Notes	Images
Bolcabalistes	B. varii		A bolcabalistid.	
Eolactoria	E. sorbinii		A boxfish.	
Eoplectus	E. bloti		An eoplectid.	
Eotetraodon	E. pygmaeus		A pufferfish.	
Eotetraodon	E. tavernei		A pufferfish.	
Heptadiodon	H. echinus		A porcupinefish.	
Proaracana	P. dubia		A deepwater boxfish.	
Prodiodon	P. erinaceus		A porcupinefish.	
Prodiodon	P. tenuispinus		A porcupinefish.	
Protacanthodes	P. nimesensis		A triplespine.	
Protacanthodes	P. ombonii		A triplespine.	
Protobalistum	P. imperiale		A protobalistid.	
Spinacanthus	S. cuneiformis		A protobalistid.	
Zignoichthys	Z. oblongus		A zignoichthyid.	
Zignodon	Z. fornasieroae		A porcupinefish.	

=== Percomorpha incertae sedis ===
Genus	Species	Presence	Notes	Images
Acronuroides	A. eocaenicus	Pesciara	An indeterminate percomorph.	
Anorevus	A. lorenzonii	Pesciara	Possibly a stem-flatfish.	
Bassanichthys	B. pesciaraensis	Pesciara	An eocottid.	
Blotichthys	B. coleanus		A percomorph of uncertain affinities.	
Bolcaperca	B. craccorum		A percomorph of uncertain affinities.	
Bradyurus	B. alessandroi		A percomorph of uncertain affinities.	
Bradyurus	B. szainochae		A percomorph of uncertain affinities.	
Callipteryx	C. speciosus		A callipterygid.	
Carangodes	C. bicornis		A carangodid.	
Cyclopoma	C. gigas		Either a temperate perch or a relative of snooks.	
Dibango	D. volans	Pesciara	A bizarre indeterminate percomorph, previously considered a species of Pegasus or a taeniosome lampriform.	
Eocottus	E. veronensis		An eocottid.	
Exellia	E. velifer		An exellid.	
Frigoichthys	F. margaritae		A percomorph of uncertain affinities.	
Frippia	F. labriformis		A percomorph of uncertain affinities.	
Gillidia	G. antiqua		A percomorph of uncertain affinities.	
Guus	G. microcephalus	Pesciara	A tortonesid (formerly considered a gobioid).	
Hendrixella	H. grandei		A robertanniid.	
Jimtylerius	J. temnopterus		A percomorph of uncertain affinities.	
Latellopsis	L. latellai		A perciform of uncertain affinities.	
Malacopygaeus	M. oblongus		A percomorph of uncertain affinities.	
Montepostalia	M. annamariae	Monte Postale	A percomorph of uncertain affinities.	
Nickcaves	N. pterygocephalus	Monte Postale	A pietschellid.	
Parapelates	P. quindecimalis		A percomorph of uncertain affinities.	
Parapygaeus	P. polyacanthus		An indeterminate percomorph.	
Pavarottia	P. astescalpone	Monte Postale	A pavarottiid.	
Pavarottia	P. lonardonii	Monte Postale	A pavarottiid.	
Pavarottia	P. maiseyi	Pesciara	A pavarottiid.	
Pietschellus	P. aenigmaticus	Monte Postale	A pietschellid.	
Pygaeus	P. bolcanus		A percomorph of uncertain affinities.	
Pygaeus	P. nobilis		A percomorph of uncertain affinities.	
Pygaeus	P. nuchalis		A percomorph of uncertain affinities.	
Quasicichla	Q. mucistonaver		An indeterminate percomorph.	
Quasinectes	Q. durello	Monte Postale	Possibly a stem-flatfish.	
Quasimullus	Q. sorbinii		A quasimullid.	
Robertannia	R. sorbiniorum		A robertanniid.	
Sorbinicapros	S. sorbiniorum		A sorbinipercid.	
Sorbiniperca	S. scheuchzeri		A sorbinipercid.	
Squamibolcoides	S. minciottii		A percomorph of uncertain affinities.	
Stefanichthys	S. mariannae		A percomorph of uncertain affinities.	
Tortonesia	T. esilis		A tortonesid.	
Veronabrax	V. schizurus		A percomorph of uncertain affinities.	
Zorzinichthys	Z. annae		A zorzinichthyid.	

=== Acanthomorpha incertae sedis ===
Genus	Species	Presence	Notes	Images
Oncolepis	O. isseli		An acanthomorph of uncertain affinities, possibly a goby.	
Protoaulopsis	P. bolcensis		An acanthomorph of uncertain affinities.	
Xiphopterus	X. falcatus		An acanthomorph of uncertain affinities.	

== Reptiles ==
Based on Seghetti et al, 2022:

=== Crocodilia ===
Crocodilians reported from Monte Bolca
Genus	Species	Presence	Notes	Images
Asiatosuchus	A. cf. depressifrons	Purga di Bolca	A crocodyloid, previously classified under "Crocodylus vicetinus"	
Boverisuchus	B. sp.	Purga di Bolca	A planocraniid, previously classified under "C. bolcensis"	
Hassiacosuchus	H. cf. haupti	Purga di Bolca	An alligatorid, previously classified under "C. vicetinus"	

A record of "C. cf. vicetinus" that is now assigned to Diplocynodon is thought to actually originate from the Oligocene-aged Monteviale site, as opposed to Bolca.

=== Testudines ===
Turtles reported from Monte Bolca
Genus	Species	Presence	Notes	Images
Neochelys	N. capellinii	Purga di Bolca	A podocnemidid turtle.	N. franzeni, a related species
"Trionyx"	"T". capellinii	Purga di Bolca	A softshell turtle.	

=== Squamata ===
Squamates reported from Monte Bolca
Genus	Species	Presence	Notes	Images
Anomalophis	A. bolcensis	Pesciara	An anomalophiid snake.	
Archaeophis	A. proavus	Pesciara	A palaeophiid snake.	
"Coluber"	"C." ombonii	Purga di Bolca	A snake of uncertain affinities.	

== Brachiopoda ==
Genus	Species	Presence	Notes	Images
"Terebratula"	"T." fumanensis	Pesciara	A terebratulid.	

== Mollusca ==
=== Bivalvia ===
Genus	Species	Presence	Notes	Images
Anomia	A. sp.			
Arcopagia	A. erycinoides	Monte Postale		
Crassostrea	C. sparnacensis	Monte Postale		
Divalinga	D. sp	Monte Postale		
Fimbria	F. lamellosa	Monte Postale		
Fimbria	F. major	Monte Postale		
Granocardium	G. sp.	Monte Postale		
Katelysia	K. texta	Monte Postale		
Lima	L. cf. papillifera			
Meiocardia	M. carinata	Monte Postale		
Modiola	M. postalensis	Monte Postale		
Monitilora	M. elegans			
Orthocardium	O. gratum	Monte Postale		
Pitar	P. lunularia	Monte Postale		
Pitar	P. parisiensis	Monte Postale		
Pseudomiltha	P. escheri	Monte Postale		
Pseudomiltha	P. gigantea	Monte Postale		
Spondylus	S. radula	Monte Postale		
Tellina	T. biangularis	Monte Postale		
Tellina	T. scalaroides	Monte Postale		
Tellina	T. sp.	Monte Postale		
Venerella	V. secunda	Monte Postale		

=== Gastropoda ===
Based on:

Genus	Species	Presence	Notes	Images
Acteon	A. subinflatus	Monte Postale		
Ampullina	A. hybrida	Monte Postale		
Ampullina	A. vulcani	Monte Postale		
Archicypraea	A. lioyi	Monte Postale		
Architectonica	A. bistriata	Monte Postale		
Bellatara	B. palaeochroma	Monte Postale		
Bezanconia	B. pyrenaica	Monte Postale		
Calliostoma	C. raffaelei	Monte Postale		
Calliostoma	C. mayeri	Monte Postale		
Campanile	C. vicetinum	Monte Postale		
Cassis	C. postalensis	Monte Postale		
Cepatia	C. cepacea	Monte Postale		
Cerithium	C. chaperi	Monte Postale		
Cerithium	C. fabani	Monte Postale		
Clanculus	C. zignoi	Monte Postale		
Clavilithes	C. rugosus	Monte Postale		
Cryptoconus	C. priscus	Monte Postale		
Cypraedia	C. elegans	Monte Postale		
Cypraedia	C. interposita	Monte Postale		
Cypraeglobina	C. praegnans	Monte Postale		
Dentellocaracolus	D. damnatus	Purga di Bolca	A helicid land snail.	
Dialopsis	D. incompleta			
Digitolabrum	D. princeps	Monte Postale		
"Drupa"	"D." crossei	Monte Postale		
Hemiconus	H. incomptus	Monte Postale		
Hippeutis	H. muzzolonicus	Purga di Bolca	A freshwater ramshorn snail.	
Hipponix	H. cornucopiae	Monte Postale		
Homalopoma	H. minimum	Monte Postale		
Leptoconus	L. deperditus	Monte Postale		
Leucodiscus	L. helicinoides	Monte Postale		
Liocarenus	L. hilarionis	Monte Postale		
Littoraria	L. postalensis	Monte Postale		
Melanopsis	M. vicetina	Purga di Bolca	An estuarine melanopsid snail.	
"Melongena"	"M." robusta	Monte Postale		
Neritopsis	N. agassizi	Monte Postale		
Pachycrommium	P. circumfossa	Monte Postale		
"Patella"	"P." boreani	Monte Postale		
Procyclotopsis	P. obtusicosta	Purga di Bolca	A pomatiid land snail.	
Pseudamaura	P. circunfossa	Monte Postale		
Pseudobellardia	P. auriculata	Monte Postale		
Pseudobellardia	P. gomphoceras	Monte Postale		
Pseudovertagus	P. striatus	Monte Postale		
Ptychocerithium	P. lamellosum	Monte Postale		
Pyrazopsis	P. pentagonatus	Monte Postale		
Semiterebellum	S. postalensis	Monte Postale		
Seraphs	S. convolutum	Monte Postale		
Tenagodus	T. sp	Monte Postale		
Tympanotonos	T. tristriatus	Monte Postale		
Velates	V. schmidelianus	Monte Postale		
Vermicularia	V. biangulatus	Monte Postale		
Vicetia	V. hantkeni	Monte Postale		
Voluta	V. musicalis	Monte Postale		

=== Cephalopoda ===
Genus	Species	Presence	Notes	Images
Aturia	A. ziczac		A nautiloid.	A related species.
Bolcaoctopus	B. pesciaraensis	Pesciara	An octopodid octopus with preserved imprints (formerly referred to as "Teuthida" indet.).	
Spirulirostra	S. georgii	Pesciara	A spirulid, known from a partial phragmocone.	

== Annelida ==
Genus	Species	Presence	Notes	Images
Eunicites	E. affinis		A eunicid bristleworm.	
Eunicites	E. gazolae		A eunicid bristleworm.	
Eunicites	E. pinnai		A eunicid bristleworm.	
Hirudinea indet.			A leech.	
Siphonostomites	S. hesionoides		A bristleworm of uncertain affinities.	

The genus Sthenelaites, formerly interpreted as a bristleworm, is now thought to represent a fossilized green algae in the Dasycladaceae.

== Arthropods ==
=== Arachnida ===
Genus	Species	Presence	Notes	Images
Eoeuscorpius	E. ceratoi	Pesciara	A scorpion, possibly a euscorpiid.	
Pseudoscorpiones indet.		Pesciara	A possible pseudoscorpion.	

=== Crustacea ===
Genus	Species	Presence	Notes	Images
Archaeocypoda	A. veronensis	Pesciara	A dorippid crab.	
Bolcacalliax	B. eocaenica	Pesciara	A callianassid shrimp.	
Enoplonotus	E. armatus	Pesciara	A swimmer crab.	
Eolinurus	E. desmaresti	Pesciara	A spiny lobster.	
Eotrachynotocarcinus	E. airaghii	Pesciara	A dromiacean crab.	
Heterosphaeroma	H. veronensis		A sphaeromatid isopod.	
Justitia	J. confusa	Pesciara	A spiny lobster.	
Justitia	J. sp.	Monte Postale	A spiny lobster.	
Lessinoachela	L. scaligera	Pesciara	An achelate crustacean of uncertain affinities.	
Lophopanopeus	L. bolcensis	Pesciara	A mud crab.	
Lophoranina	L. maxima	Pesciara & Monte Postale	A frog crab.	
Lysiosquilla	L. antiqua		A mantis shrimp.	
?"Macropipus"	"M." ovalipes	Pesciara	A crab of uncertain affinities.	
Majoidea indet.		Monte Postale	A majoid crab.	
Palaega	P. acuticauda		A cirolanid isopod.	
?Parsacus	?P. cristatus	Pesciara	A slipper lobster.	
Penaeus	P. bolcensis	Pesciara	A penaeid prawn.	
Penaeus	?P. obtusus	Pesciara	A penaeid prawn.	
?Pseudobombur	?P. nummuliticus	Pesciara	A penaeid prawn.	
Pseudosquilla	P. lessinea		A mantis shrimp.	
Scyllarides	S. bolcensis	Monte Postale	A slipper lobster.	
Sphaeroma	S. sp.		A sphaeromatid isopod.	

=== Insecta ===
==== Odonata ====
Genus	Species	Presence	Notes	Images
Bolcacordulia	B. paradoxa	Pesciara	A bolcacorduliid dragonfly.	
Bolcathemis	B. nervosa	Pesciara	A palaeomacromiid dragonfly.	
Bolcathore	B. colorata	Pesciara	A bolcathorid damselfly.	

==== Orthoptera ====
Genus	Species	Presence	Notes	Images
Pterotriamescaptor	P. tridactylina	Pesciara	A mole cricket.	

==== Hemiptera ====
Genus	Species	Presence	Notes	Images
Halobates	H. ruffoi	Pesciara	A sea skater, the earliest known from the fossil record.	H. matsumurai, a modern species

==== Diptera ====
Genus	Species	Presence	Notes	Images
Bibio	B. sereri	Pesciara	A march fly.	B. hortulanus, a modern species.
Dipterites	D. angelinii	Pesciara	A brachyceran fly.	
Gnophomyia	G. gentilinii	Pesciara	A limoniid crane fly.	G. tristissima, a modern species
Gonomyia	G. sp.	Pesciara	A limoniid crane fly.	G. alexanderi, a modern species
Tipulidae indet.		Pesciara	A tipulid crane fly.	

== Cnidaria ==
Genus	Species	Presence	Notes	Images
Simplicibrachia	S. bolcensis	Pesciara	A rhizostomid jellyfish.	

== Fungi ==
Genus	Species	Presence	Notes	Images
"Deuteromycetes" indet.		Vegroni	A fungus on the leaf of Latanites.	
"Discomycetes" indet.		Vegroni	A fungus on the leaf of Latanites.	
Pyrenomycetes indet.		Vegroni	A fungus on the leaf of Latanites.	
Sphaerites	S. eugeniophilus	Pesciara-Monte Postale	A fungus on the leaf of Eugeniae laurifoliae	
Spilosphaerites	S. priscus	Pesciara-Monte Postale	A fungus on the leaf of Eugeniae laurifoliae	

== Plantae ==
Based on Massalongo (1859), though many taxa are form taxa, highly dubious or nomina nuda, and/or use outdated taxonomy:

=== Red algae ===
Genus	Species	Presence	Notes	Images
Amansites	A. prionomorphus	Pesciara-Monte Postale	A red alga, possibly a florideophycean.	
Ceramites	C. codioides	Pesciara-Monte Postale	A red alga, possibly a ceramiale.	
Ceramites	C. floccosa	Pesciara-Monte Postale	A red alga, possibly a ceramiale.	
Ceramites	C. parasitica	Pesciara-Monte Postale	A red alga, possibly a ceramiale.	
Ceramites	C. pectinata	Pesciara-Monte Postale	A red alga, possibly a ceramiale.	
Ceramites	C. sciuroides	Pesciara-Monte Postale	A red alga, possibly a ceramiale.	
Ceramites	C. sphacelarioides	Pesciara-Monte Postale	A red alga, possibly a ceramiale.	
Chondrites	C. dasyphyllus	Pesciara-Monte Postale	A red alga, possibly a florideophycean.	
Chondrites	C. dichotomus	Pesciara-Monte Postale	A red alga, possibly a florideophycean.	
Chondrites	C. pollinianus	Pesciara-Monte Postale	A red alga, possibly a florideophycean.	
Chondrites	C. rytiphloeoides	Pesciara-Monte Postale	A red alga, possibly a florideophycean.	
Chondrites	C. tenuissimus	Pesciara-Monte Postale	A red alga, possibly a florideophycean.	
Delesserites	D. bolcensis	Pesciara-Monte Postale	A red alga, possibly a florideophycean.	
Delesserites	D. calophyllus	Pesciara-Monte Postale	A red alga, possibly a florideophycean.	
Delesserites	D. dimidiatus	Pesciara-Monte Postale	A red alga, possibly a florideophycean.	
Delesserites	D. heckelianus	Pesciara-Monte Postale	A red alga, possibly a florideophycean.	
Delesserites	D. pinnatus	Pesciara-Monte Postale	A red alga, possibly a florideophycean.	
Delesserites	D. podocarpiphyllus	Pesciara-Monte Postale	A red alga, possibly a florideophycean.	
Delesserites	D. manganottii	Pesciara-Monte Postale	A red alga, possibly a florideophycean.	
Delesserites	D. sessilis	Pesciara-Monte Postale	A red alga, possibly a florideophycean.	
Delesserites	D. ovatus	Pesciara-Monte Postale	A red alga, possibly a florideophycean.	
Melobesites	M. membranacea	Pesciara-Monte Postale	A red alga, possibly coralline alga.	
Pterigophycos	P. canossae	Pesciara-Monte Postale	A red algae, possibly a florideophycean, highly variable in leaf shape, indicating that there may not be multiple species.	
Pterigophycos	P. gazolanus	Pesciara-Monte Postale	A red algae, possibly a florideophycean, highly variable in leaf shape, indicating that there may not be multiple species.	
Pterigophycos	P. pinnatifidus	Pesciara-Monte Postale	A red algae, possibly a florideophycean, highly variable in leaf shape, indicating that there may not be multiple species.	
Pterigophycos	P. spectabilis	Pesciara-Monte Postale	A red algae, possibly a florideophycean, highly variable in leaf shape, indicating that there may not be multiple species.	
Sphaerococcites	S. dendroides	Pesciara-Monte Postale	A red alga, possibly a florideophycean.	
Sphaerococcites	?S. fastigiatus	Pesciara-Monte Postale	A red alga, possibly a florideophycean.	

=== Green algae ===
Genus	Species	Presence	Notes	Images
Aristophycos	A. aghardianus	Pesciara-Monte Postale	An green alga.	
Caulerpites	C. araucaria	Pesciara-Monte Postale	An green alga.	
Nemalionites	N. cristatus	Pesciara-Monte Postale	An green alga.	
Nemalionites	N. limacoides	Pesciara-Monte Postale	An green alga.	

=== Pteridophytes ===
Genus	Species	Presence	Notes	Images
Asplenites	A. rhadamanti	Vegroni	A fern.	
Cystorrhiza	C. pillularioides	Pesciara-Monte Postale	A marsilacean fern.	
Fortisia	F. renieriana	Vegroni	A fern.	

=== Gymnosperms ===
Genus	Species	Presence	Notes	Images
Podocarpus	P. affinis	Pesciara-Monte Postale	A podocarpacean conifer.	
Podocarpus	P. bolcensis	Pesciara-Monte Postale	A podocarpacean conifer.	
Podocarpus	P. incisa	Pesciara-Monte Postale	A podocarpacean conifer.	
Podocarpus	P. scolecophylla	Pesciara-Monte Postale	A podocarpacean conifer.	
Podocarpus	P. surianoides	Pesciara-Monte Postale	A podocarpacean conifer.	
Taxodium	T. jacarandaefolium	Pesciara-Monte Postale	A relative of the bald cypress.	

=== Angiosperms ===
==== Monocots ====
Genus	Species	Presence	Notes	Images
Albucastrum	A. perianthioideum	Pesciara-Monte Postale	A liliacean.	
Apludophyton	A. cucubaloides	Pesciara-Monte Postale	A grass.	
Apludophyton	A. scleroides	Pesciara-Monte Postale	A grass.	
Arundinites	A. dracenophylla	Pesciara-Monte Postale	A grass.	
Bromelianthus	B. heuflerianus	Pesciara-Monte Postale	An apparent bromeliad, but taxonomic assignment disputed.	
Castellinia	C. ambigua	Pesciara-Monte Postale	A palm fruit.	
Castellinia	C. compressa	Pesciara-Monte Postale	A palm fruit.	
Castellinia	C. elliptica	Pesciara-Monte Postale	A palm fruit.	
Castellinia	?C. incurva	Pesciara-Monte Postale	A palm fruit.	
Castellinia	C. macrocarpa	Pesciara-Monte Postale	A palm fruit.	
Castellinia	?C. subrotunda	Pesciara-Monte Postale	A palm fruit.	
Caulinites	C. divaricatus	Pesciara-Monte Postale	A seagrass.	
Caulinites	C. equisetimorphus	Pesciara-Monte Postale	A seagrass.	
Crinanthus	C. fenzlianus	Pesciara-Monte Postale	A liliacean.	
Cyperites	C. bolcensis	Pesciara-Monte Postale	A sedge.	
Cyperites	C. eocenus	Pesciara-Monte Postale	A sedge.	
Geonomites	G. saturnia	Vegroni	A palm leaf.	
Halochloris	H. castelliniana	Pesciara-Monte Postale	A seagrass.	
Halochloris	H. cymodoceoides	Pesciara-Monte Postale	A seagrass.	
Halochloris	H. fluitans	Pesciara-Monte Postale	A seagrass.	
Halochloris	H. meneghinii	Pesciara-Monte Postale	A seagrass.	
Halochloris	H. stolonifera	Pesciara-Monte Postale	A seagrass.	
Halochloris	H. striata	Pesciara-Monte Postale	A seagrass.	
Halochloris	H. subsecunda	Pesciara-Monte Postale	A seagrass.	
Halochloris	H. ungeri	Pesciara-Monte Postale	A seagrass.	
Halochloris	H. veronensis	Pesciara-Monte Postale	A seagrass.	
Latanites	L. brocchiana	Vegroni	A palm, whole trees sometimes preserved.	
Latanites	L. galilejana	Vegroni	A palm, whole trees sometimes preserved.	
Latanites	L. parvula	Pesciara-Monte Postale	A palm, whole trees sometimes preserved.	
Latanites	L. pinnata	Vegroni	A palm, whole trees sometimes preserved.	
Latanites	L. praticinensis	Vegroni & Purga di Bolca	A palm, whole trees sometimes preserved.	
Latanites	L. vegronum	Vegroni	A palm, whole trees sometimes preserved.	
Musophyllum	M. italicum	Vegroni	A potential banana relative.	
Palaeorchis	P. rhizoma	Pesciara-Monte Postale	An orchid.	
Palaeospathe	P. elliptica	Pesciara-Monte Postale	A palm fruit.	
Palaeospathe	P. lata	Pesciara-Monte Postale	A palm fruit.	
Palmacites	P. neocaenus	Vegroni	A palm.	
Phoenicites	P. danteana	Vegroni	A palm leaf.	
Phoenicites	P. veronensis	Vegroni	A palm leaf.	
Phoenicites	P. wettinioides	Vegroni	A palm leaf.	
Poacites	P. juncoides	Pesciara-Monte Postale	A grass.	
Posidocea	P. frickhingeri	Pesciara-Monte Postale	A posidoniacean seagrass. Taxonomy affinity uncertain, as floral structures differ from those of Posidonia.	
Protorchis	P. monorchis	Pesciara-Monte Postale	An orchid.	
Ruppia	R. aristata	Pesciara-Monte Postale	A wigeongrass.	
?Smilacites	?S. lancea	Pesciara-Monte Postale	A smilacean.	
"Thecophyllum"	T. flabellatum	Pesciara-Monte Postale	A palm.	
Stratiotes (=Folliculites)	S. kaltennordheimensis	Purga di Bolca	A water-soldier (formerly considered a potential casuarinacean)	
Typhaeloipum	T. spadae	Pesciara-Monte Postale	A cattail relative.	
Zannichelliopsis	Z. repens	Pesciara-Monte Postale	A seagrass.	

==== "Dicots" ====
Genus	Species	Presence	Notes	Images
Acacia	A. buellana	Pesciara-Monte Postale	A potential acacia.	
Acacia	A. eugenioides	Pesciara-Monte Postale	A potential acacia.	
Acacia	A. primordialis	Pesciara-Monte Postale	A potential acacia.	
Ampelophyllum	A. bolcense	Pesciara-Monte Postale	A potential Vitaceae.	
Ampelophyllum	A. noeticum	Pesciara-Monte Postale	A potential Vitaceae.	
Ampelophyllum	A. voltianum	Pesciara-Monte Postale	A potential Vitaceae.	
Anadenia	A. italica	Pesciara-Monte Postale	An apparent grevillea.	
Anadenia	A. pighiana	Pesciara-Monte Postale	An apparent grevillea.	
Apocynophyllum	A. bozzianum	Pesciara-Monte Postale	A potential Apocynaceae.	
Apocynophyllum	A. oligocaenum	Vegroni	A potential Apocynaceae.	
Apocynophyllum	A. terminaliaefolium	Pesciara-Monte Postale	A potential Apocynaceae.	
Andromeda	A. biloba	Pesciara-Monte Postale	A relative of the bog-rosemary.	
Andromeda	A. cincinnati	Pesciara-Monte Postale	A relative of the bog-rosemary.	
Andromeda	A. latina	Pesciara-Monte Postale	A relative of the bog-rosemary.	
Andromeda	A. palaeogaea	Pesciara-Monte Postale	A relative of the bog-rosemary.	
Andromeda	A. santalina	Pesciara-Monte Postale	A relative of the bog-rosemary.	
Andromeda	A. stillingioides	Pesciara-Monte Postale	A relative of the bog-rosemary.	
Andromeda	A. tromodophylla	Pesciara-Monte Postale	A relative of the bog-rosemary.	
Andromeda	A. visianii	Pesciara-Monte Postale	A relative of the bog-rosemary.	
Aralia	A. primaeva	Pesciara-Monte Postale	A spikenard.	
Aralianthea	A. brogniartii	Pesciara-Monte Postale	A potential spikenard.	
Aralianthea	A. laurina	Pesciara-Monte Postale	A potential spikenard.	
Aralianthea	A. zizioides	Pesciara-Monte Postale	A potential spikenard.	
Banksia	B. longifolia	Pesciara-Monte Postale	An apparent banksia.	
?Berberis	?B. prisca	Pesciara-Monte Postale	A potential barberry.	
Bignonia	B. boroniaefolia	Pesciara-Monte Postale	A bignonia.	
Bignonia	B. limoniaefolia	Pesciara-Monte Postale	A bignonia.	
Bignonia	B. moringaefolia	Pesciara-Monte Postale	A bignonia.	
Bubulcia	B. alismantha	Pesciara-Monte Postale	A potential Zygophyllaceae.	
Bubulcia	B. globifera	Pesciara-Monte Postale	A potential Zygophyllaceae.	
Bumelia	B. buxioides	Pesciara-Monte Postale	A bully tree.	
Bumelia	B. calceolarii	Pesciara-Monte Postale	A bully tree.	
Bumelia	B. clusiaefolia	Pesciara-Monte Postale	A bully tree.	
Bumelia	B. cuneifolia	Pesciara-Monte Postale	A bully tree.	
Caesalpinia	C. eocenica	Pesciara-Monte Postale	A legume.	
Calligonopsis	C. pallasioides	Pesciara-Monte Postale	A knotweed.	
Calligonopsis	C. strumphsioides	Pesciara-Monte Postale	A knotweed.	
Cassia	C. enervis	Pesciara-Monte Postale	A legume.	
Ceanothus	C. cornifolius	Pesciara-Monte Postale	A ceanothus.	
Celastrophyllum	C. gaudinianum	Pesciara-Monte Postale	A potential Celastraceae.	
Celastrophyllum	C. oleaefolium	Pesciara-Monte Postale	A potential Celastraceae.	
Celastrus	C. nitrariaefolius	Pesciara-Monte Postale	A potential staff vine.	
Celastrus	C. scandentifolius	Pesciara-Monte Postale	A potential staff vine.	
Ceratophyllum	C. cuspidatum	Pesciara-Monte Postale	A coontail.	
Cinnamomum	C. antiquum	Pesciara-Monte Postale	A cinnamon.	
Cinnamomum	C. veronense	Pesciara-Monte Postale	A cinnamon.	
Coccolobites	C. morindioides	Pesciara-Monte Postale	A potential Polygonaceae.	
Crataegus	C. moscardianus	Pesciara-Monte Postale	A potential hawthorn.	
Cucubalites	?C. flagellum	Pesciara-Monte Postale	A potential Caryophyllaceae.	
Cucubalites	C. postalensis	Pesciara-Monte Postale	A potential Caryophyllaceae.	
Dombeyopsis	D. affinis	Pesciara-Monte Postale	A potential "Byttneriaceae".	
Dombeyopsis	D. bixaefolia	Pesciara-Monte Postale	A potential "Byttneriaceae".	
Dombeyopsis	D. ceanothifolia	Pesciara-Monte Postale	A potential "Byttneriaceae".	
Dombeyopsis	D. decipiens	Pesciara-Monte Postale	A potential "Byttneriaceae".	
Dombeyopsis	D. deformis	Pesciara-Monte Postale	A potential "Byttneriaceae".	
Dombeyopsis	D. glandulifera	Pesciara-Monte Postale	A potential "Byttneriaceae".	
Dombeyopsis	D. granadilla	Pesciara-Monte Postale	A potential "Byttneriaceae".	
Dombeyopsis	D. hibiscifolia	Pesciara-Monte Postale	A potential "Byttneriaceae".	
Dombeyopsis	D. incerta	Pesciara-Monte Postale	A potential "Byttneriaceae".	
Dombeyopsis	D. kleinhowiaefolia	Pesciara-Monte Postale	A potential "Byttneriaceae".	
Dombeyopsis	D. populina	Pesciara-Monte Postale	A potential "Byttneriaceae".	
Dombeyopsis	D. sublobata	Pesciara-Monte Postale	A potential "Byttneriaceae".	
Dombeyopsis	D. tilioides	Pesciara-Monte Postale	A potential "Byttneriaceae".	
Drepanocarpus	D. dacampii	Pesciara-Monte Postale	A legume.	
Drepanocarpus	D. nummus	Pesciara-Monte Postale	A legume.	
Dryandra	D. chironis	Pesciara-Monte Postale	An apparent dryandra.	
Dryandra	D. meneghinii	Pesciara-Monte Postale	An apparent dryandra.	
Dryandra	D. veronensis	Pesciara-Monte Postale	An apparent dryandra.	
Eucalyptus	E. aconicophylla	Pesciara-Monte Postale	A potential eucalypt.	
Eucalyptus	E. italica	Pesciara-Monte Postale	A potential eucalypt.	
Eucalyptus	E. rhododendrophylla	Pesciara-Monte Postale	A potential eucalypt.	
Eucalyptus	E. targue	Pesciara-Monte Postale	A potential eucalypt.	
Eugenia	E. andiraefolia	Pesciara-Monte Postale	A probable Myrtaceae.	
Eugenia	E. dactylostemoides	Pesciara-Monte Postale	A probable Myrtaceae.	
Eugenia	E. laurifolia	Pesciara-Monte Postale	A probable Myrtaceae.	
Euonymus	E. maytenopsis	Vegroni	A potential Celastraceae.	
Ficus	F. bolcensis	Pesciara-Monte Postale	A fig.	
Ficus	F. coelestis	Pesciara-Monte Postale	A fig.	
Ficus	F. poniana	Pesciara-Monte Postale	A fig.	
Ficus	F. psichotrioides	Pesciara-Monte Postale	A fig.	
Ficus	F. veronensis	Pesciara-Monte Postale	A fig.	
Fracastoria	F. anguria	Pesciara-Monte Postale	A potential Sterculioideae, based on fruits.	
Fracastoria	F. citriformis	Pesciara-Monte Postale	A potential Sterculioideae, based on fruits.	
Fracastoria	F. citrullus	Pesciara-Monte Postale	A potential Sterculioideae, based on fruits.	
Fracastoria	F. clavaeformis	Pesciara-Monte Postale	A potential Sterculioideae, based on fruits.	
Fracastoria	F. cucurbitina	Pesciara-Monte Postale	A potential Sterculioideae, based on fruits.	
Fracastoria	F. gastrioides	Pesciara-Monte Postale	A potential Sterculioideae, based on fruits.	
Fracastoria	F. gigantea	Pesciara-Monte Postale	A potential Sterculioideae, based on fruits.	
Fracastoria	F. lagenaria	Pesciara-Monte Postale	A potential Sterculioideae, based on fruits.	
Fracastoria	F. megapepo	Pesciara-Monte Postale	A potential Sterculioideae, based on fruits.	
Fracastoria	F. melo	Pesciara-Monte Postale	A potential Sterculioideae, based on fruits.	
Fracastoria	F. pomiformis	Pesciara-Monte Postale	A potential Sterculioideae, based on fruits.	
Fracastoria	F. pyramidalis	Pesciara-Monte Postale	A potential Sterculioideae, based on fruits.	
Fracastoria	F. pyriformis	Pesciara-Monte Postale	A potential Sterculioideae, based on fruits.	
Fracastoria	F. rotunda	Pesciara-Monte Postale	A potential Sterculioideae, based on fruits.	
Fracastoria	F. zignoana	Pesciara-Monte Postale	A potential Sterculioideae, based on fruits.	
Gautiera	G. trichoides	Pesciara-Monte Postale	A wintergreen.	
Getonia	G. bolcensis	Pesciara-Monte Postale	A potential relative of ukshi.	
Getonia	G. potentilloides	Pesciara-Monte Postale	A potential relative of ukshi.	
Glossophium	G. eocenum	Pesciara-Monte Postale	An apparent riverweed.	
Glossophium	G. proliferum	Pesciara-Monte Postale	An apparent riverweed.	
Grewia	G. coccolobaefolia	Pesciara-Monte Postale	A potential Tiliaceae.	
Guajacites	G. berengerii	Pesciara-Monte Postale	A potential Zygophyllaceae.	
Guajacites	G. enervis	Pesciara-Monte Postale	A potential Zygophyllaceae.	
Guajacites	G. heeri	Pesciara-Monte Postale	A potential Zygophyllaceae.	
Hesperidophyllum	H. citroides	Pesciara-Monte Postale	A potential Rutaceae.	
Hesperidophyllum	H. ettingshauseni	Pesciara-Monte Postale	A potential Rutaceae.	
Hesperidophyllum	H. scalpellum	Pesciara-Monte Postale	A potential Rutaceae.	
Jacaranda	J. italica	Pesciara-Monte Postale	An apparent jacaranda.	
Jacaranda	J. speciosa	Pesciara-Monte Postale	An apparent jacaranda.	
Juglans	?J. costata	Vegroni	A potential walnut.	
Juglans	J. elaenoides	Vegroni	A potential walnut.	
Juglans	J. ossilii	Pesciara-Monte Postale	A potential walnut.	
Juglans	J. sapindacea	Pesciara-Monte Postale	A potential walnut.	
Koelreuteria	K. corcorifolia	Pesciara-Monte Postale	A potential Koelreuteria.	
Koelreuteria	K. maffejana	Pesciara-Monte Postale	A potential Koelreuteria.	
Leguminosites	L. phaseolus	Pesciara-Monte Postale	A legume.	
Leptomeria	L. distans	Pesciara-Monte Postale	A mistletoe.	
Leptomeria	L. gracilis	Pesciara-Monte Postale	A mistletoe.	
Leptomeria	L. psilotina	Pesciara-Monte Postale	A mistletoe.	
Maffeia	M. ceratophylloides	Pesciara-Monte Postale	A potential riverweed.	
Malpighiastrum	M. ambiguum	Pesciara-Monte Postale	A potential Malpighiaceae.	
Malpighiastrum	M. dehaasioides	Pesciara-Monte Postale	A potential Malpighiaceae.	
Malpighiastrum	M. hyraeaeoides	Pesciara-Monte Postale	A potential Malpighiaceae.	
Manglesia	M. synaphaeaefolia	Pesciara-Monte Postale	An apparent grevillea.	
Melianthus	M. craccorum	Pesciara-Monte Postale	A potential honey flower.	
Myrica	M. zig-zag	Pesciara-Monte Postale	A bayberry.	
Myrtomiophyton	M. stephanophorus	Pesciara-Monte Postale	A potential Myrtaceae.	
?Nandina	?N. consolatii	Pesciara-Monte Postale	A potential relative of nandina.	
Nymphaea	N. arethusae	Pesciara-Monte Postale	A waterlily.	
Nymphaea	N. cherpica	Pesciara-Monte Postale	A waterlily.	
Omalanthus	O. hekastophylloides	Pesciara-Monte Postale	A potential Euphorbiaceae.	
Palaeolobium	P. alnifolium	Pesciara-Monte Postale	A legume.	
Palaeolobium	P. brennonicum	Pesciara-Monte Postale	A legume.	
Palaeolobium	P. buteaefolium	Pesciara-Monte Postale	A legume.	
Palaeolobium	P. cedrelaefolium	Pesciara-Monte Postale	A legume.	
Palaeolobium	P. ficifolium	Pesciara-Monte Postale	A legume.	
Palaeolobium	P. morindaefolium	Pesciara-Monte Postale	A legume.	
Palaeolobium	P. nervosum	Pesciara-Monte Postale	A legume.	
"Peltophyllum"	P. nelumbioides	Pesciara-Monte Postale	A potential Cabombaceae.	
Phyllanthus	P. ceanothoides	Pesciara-Monte Postale	A potential Phyllanthaceae.	
Phyllanthus	P. populinus	Pesciara-Monte Postale	A potential Phyllanthaceae.	
Pongamia	P. protogaea	Pesciara-Monte Postale	A potential relative of the Indian beech.	
Protea	P. glossa	Pesciara-Monte Postale	An apparent sugarbush.	
Pterocarpus	P. lestrigonum	Pesciara-Monte Postale	A legume.	
Pterocarpus	P. targionii	Pesciara-Monte Postale	A legume.	
Pterospermum	P. malpighiaceum	Pesciara-Monte Postale	A potential "Byttneriaceae".	
Quercus	Q. vegronia	Vegroni	An oak.	
Santalum	S. memecyloides	Pesciara-Monte Postale	A sandalwood.	
Sapindus	S. goeppertianus	Pesciara-Monte Postale	A soapberry.	
Sapindus	S. pristinus	Pesciara-Monte Postale	A soapberry.	
Sapindus	S. scytinophyllus	Pesciara-Monte Postale	A soapberry.	
Sapotacites	S. oleaefolius	Pesciara-Monte Postale	A sapotacean.	
Sarothrostachys	S. eocenica	Pesciara-Monte Postale	A euphorbiacean.	
Sophora	S. capparifolia	Pesciara-Monte Postale	A legume.	
Sterculia	S. majae	Pesciara-Monte Postale	A potential tropical chestnut.	
Sterculia	S. prisca	Pesciara-Monte Postale	A potential tropical chestnut.	
Terminalia	T. perseaefolia	Vegroni	A potential Combretaceae.	
Trapophyllum	T. europaeum	Pesciara-Monte Postale	A potential relative of water caltrops.	
Tympanophora	T. bracteosa	Pesciara-Monte Postale	An apparent riverweed.	
Tympanophora	T. discophora	Pesciara-Monte Postale	An apparent riverweed.	
Tympanophora	T. turbinata	Pesciara-Monte Postale	An apparent riverweed.	
Vaccinium	V. convolvulinum	Pesciara-Monte Postale	A blueberry.	
Villarsites	V. ungeri	Pesciara-Monte Postale	A gentian.	
Weinmannia	W. ausoniae	Pesciara-Monte Postale	A potential Cunoniaceae.	
Weinmannia	W. elaphriifolia	Pesciara-Monte Postale	A potential Cunoniaceae.	
Weinmannia	W. fagaraefolia	Pesciara-Monte Postale	A potential Cunoniaceae.	
Weinmannia	W. incerta	Pesciara-Monte Postale	A potential Cunoniaceae.	
Zanthoxylum	Z. ambiguum	Pesciara-Monte Postale	A potential Rutaceae.	
Zanthoxylum	Z. cherpicum	Pesciara-Monte Postale	A potential Rutaceae.	

=== Incertae sedis ===
Genus	Species	Presence	Notes	Images
Agnophyton	A. aristatum	Pesciara-Monte Postale	Plant of uncertain affinities.	
Antholites	A. ligula	Pesciara-Monte Postale	Plant of uncertain affinities.	
Antholites	A. liliacea	Pesciara-Monte Postale	Plant of uncertain affinities.	
Antholites	A. nymphoides	Pesciara-Monte Postale	Plant of uncertain affinities.	
Carpolithes	C. binucularis	Pesciara-Monte Postale	Fruit of uncertain affinities.	
Carpolithes	C. carandioides	Pesciara-Monte Postale	Fruit of uncertain affinities.	
Carpolithes	C. chamaeropsis	Vegroni	Fruit of uncertain affinities.	
Carpolithes	C. lacunosus	Pesciara-Monte Postale	Fruit of uncertain affinities.	
Carpolithes	C. longipes	Pesciara-Monte Postale	Fruit of uncertain affinities.	
Carpolithes	C. micropepo	Pesciara-Monte Postale	Fruit of uncertain affinities.	
Carpolithes	C. orbis	Pesciara-Monte Postale	Fruit of uncertain affinities.	
Carpolithes	C. subtriangularis	Pesciara-Monte Postale	Fruit of uncertain affinities.	
Carpolithes	C. vegronum	Vegroni	Fruit of uncertain affinities.	

== Chromista ==
Genus	Species	Presence	Notes	Images
Dictyotites	D. aspergillum	Pesciara-Monte Postale	A brown alga.	
Dictyotites	D. menegazzianus	Pesciara-Monte Postale	A brown alga.	
Dictyotites	D. radiatus	Pesciara-Monte Postale	A brown alga.	
Dictyotites	D. rigidus	Pesciara-Monte Postale	A brown alga.	
Dictyotites	D. stipitatus	Pesciara-Monte Postale	A brown alga.	
Laminarites	L. irideaephyllus	Pesciara-Monte Postale	A brown alga.	
Laminarites	L. lamourouxii	Pesciara-Monte Postale	A brown alga.	
Laminarites	L. macrophyllus	Pesciara-Monte Postale	A brown alga.	
Laminarites	L. scolopendra	Pesciara-Monte Postale	A brown alga.	
Laminarites	L. vestenae	Pesciara-Monte Postale	A brown alga.	
Pasinia	?P. ambigua	Pesciara-Monte Postale	A brown alga.	
Pasinia	P. elliptica	Pesciara-Monte Postale	A brown alga.	
Pasinia	P. incurva	Pesciara-Monte Postale	A brown alga.	
Pasinia	P. ovalis	Pesciara-Monte Postale	A brown alga.	
Pasinia	P. pyriformis	Pesciara-Monte Postale	A brown alga.	
Pasinia	P. rotundata	Pesciara-Monte Postale	A brown alga.	
Postelsiopsis	P. caput-medusae	Pesciara-Monte Postale	A kelp similar in form to the sea palm.	
Zonarites	Z. chlorophlegma	Pesciara-Monte Postale	A brown alga.	
Zonarites	Z. flagellaris	Pesciara-Monte Postale	A brown alga.	
Zonarites	Z. fuliginosus	Pesciara-Monte Postale	A brown alga.	
