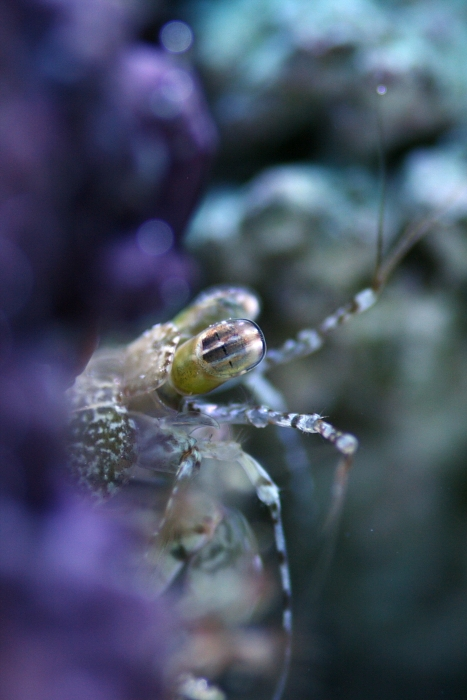

Scientific classification
- Kingdom: Animalia
- Phylum: Arthropoda
- Clade: Pancrustacea
- Class: Malacostraca
- Order: Stomatopoda
- Superfamily: Gonodactyloidea
- Family: Pseudosquillidae; Manning, 1977

= Pseudosquillidae =

Family of crustaceans

The Pseudosquillidae are a family of mantis shrimp containing four genera and 11 species.

== Characteristics ==
The mantis shrimps in this family are characterised by the dactylus of the chelipeds not inflated on the outer margin and with three teeth on the inner margin. The telson and sixth abdominal segment are fully articulated and not fused together. The distal segment of the exopod of the uropod articulates and the moveable spine on the outer margin near its base is not recurved. Members of this family contain three teeth on the dactylus of their raptorial claws. The ecoparasitic gastropod, Caledoniella montrouzieri Souverbie comprises the first record for a member of this family.

== Genera and species ==
According to the World Register of Marine Species, the family includes these genera and species:

- Pseudosquilla Dana, 1852
  - P. ciliata (Fabricius, 1787)
- Pseudosquillana Cappola & Manning, 1995
  - P. megalophthalma (Bigelow, 1893)
  - P. richeri (Moosa, 1991)
- Pseudosquillisma Cappola & Manning, 1995
  - P. adiastalta (Manning, 1964)
  - P. guttata (Manning, 1972)
  - P. kensleyi Ahyong, 2005
  - P. oculata (Brullé, 1837)
- Raoulserenea Manning, 1995
  - R. hieroglyphica (Manning, 1972)
  - R. komaii (Moosa, 1991)
  - R. ornata (Miers, 1880)
  - R. oxyrhyncha (Borradaile, 1898)
