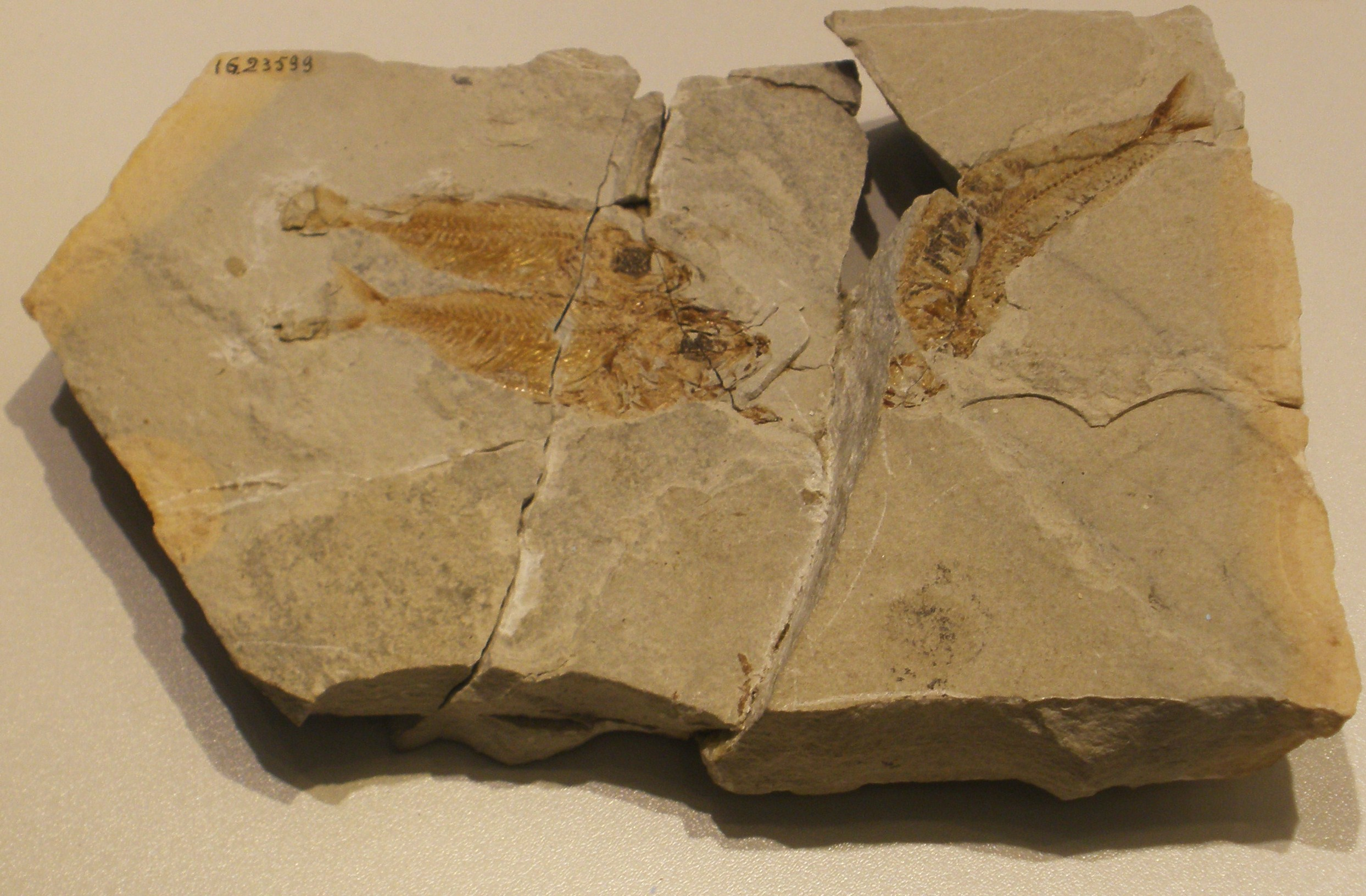
- Specimen at the Museo dei Fossili di Bolca

Scientific classification
- Kingdom: Animalia
- Phylum: Chordata
- Class: Actinopterygii
- Division: Teleostei
- Order: Beryciformes
- Family: Holocentridae
- Genus: †Berybolcensis; Sorbini, 1984
- Species: †B. leptacanthus

Binomial name
- †Berybolcensis leptacanthus (Agassiz, 1838)

= Berybolcensis =

Berybolcensis Temporal range: Early Eocene

Extinct genus of fishes

Berybolcensis is an extinct genus of prehistoric marine ray-finned fish that lived in the early Eocene. It contains a single species, B. leptacanthus, from the Monte Bolca lagerstatten of Italy. It was a member of the Holocentridae, making it related to modern squirrelfish and soldierfish, although it was more basal than either, and is thought to have diverged from their common ancestor around the Cretaceous-Paleogene boundary. It is thought to be related to Tenuicentrum, another basal holocentrid from the same formation.

== See also ==
- Prehistoric fish
- List of prehistoric bony fish
