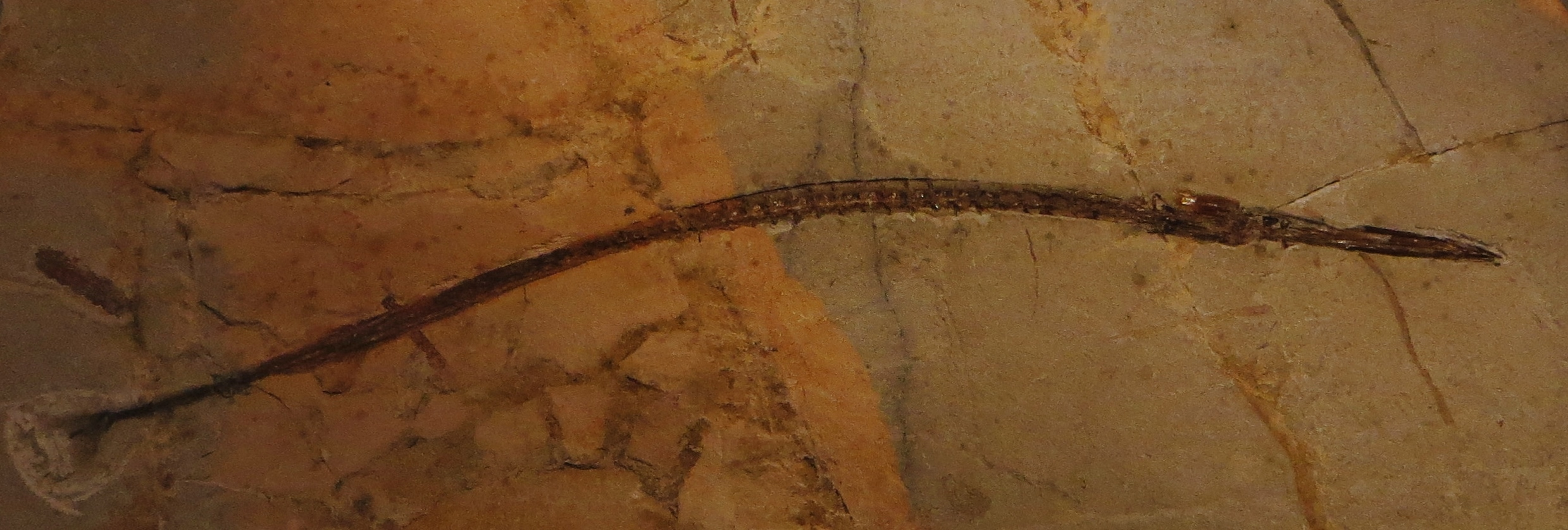
- F. veronensis specimen, Museo dei Fossili di Bolca

Scientific classification
- Domain: Eukaryota
- Kingdom: Animalia
- Phylum: Chordata
- Class: Actinopterygii
- Order: Syngnathiformes
- Family: †Fistularioididae
- Genus: †Fistularioides; Blot, 1980

Species
- †F. veronensis Blot, 1980; †F. phyllolepis Blot, 1980

= Fistularioides =

Fistularioides Temporal range: Early Eocene

Extinct genus of fishes

Fistularioides (meaning "Fistularia-like") is an extinct genus of prehistoric marine syngnathiform fish that lived during the Early Eocene of Europe. It is known from two species, F. veronensis Blot, 1980 and F. phyllolepis Blot, 1980 from the Monte Bolca site of Italy.

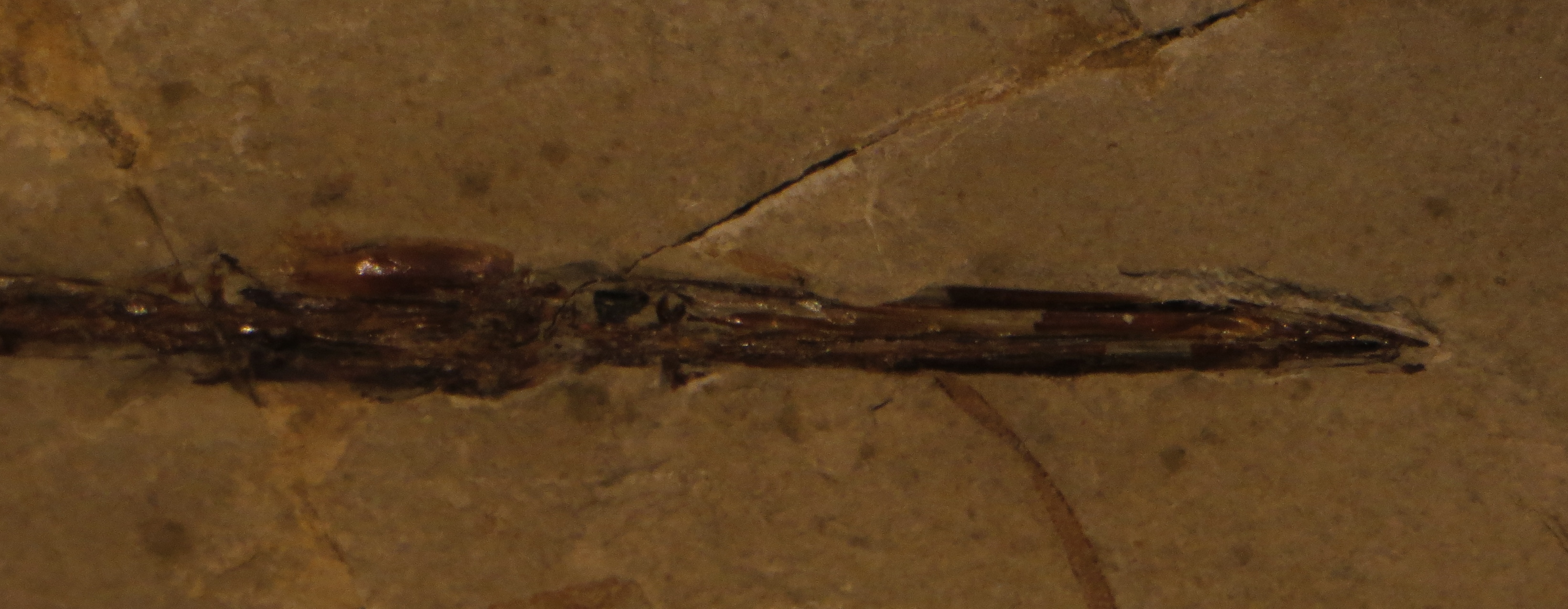
Closeup of skull

As its name suggests, it superficially resembled and was related to the cornetfishes, though it belonged to its own extinct family, the Fistularioididae. It is one of two known genera from this family, alongside Pseudosyngnathus from the same locality.
