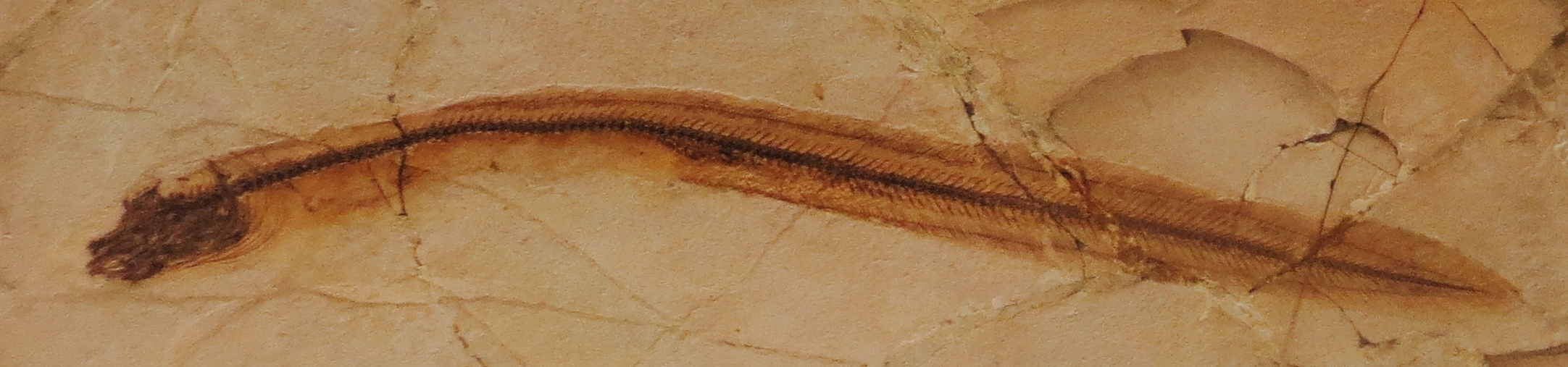

Scientific classification
- Kingdom: Animalia
- Phylum: Chordata
- Class: Actinopterygii
- Order: Anguilliformes
- Family: †Anguilloididae
- Genus: †Anguilloides; Cadrobbi, 1962
- Species: †A. branchiostegalis

Binomial name
- †Anguilloides branchiostegalis (Eastman, 1905)

= Anguilloides =

Anguilloides Temporal range: Early Eocene

Extinct genus of fishes

Anguilloides is an extinct genus of prehistoric marine eel that lived in the early Eocene. It contains a single species, A. branchiostegalis. Fossils are known from the famous Monte Bolca site of Italy.

It is one of two genera in the extinct family Anguilloididae alongside Veronanguilla. The family is thought to represent a basal member of the suborder Anguilloidei.

== See also ==
- Prehistoric fish
- List of prehistoric bony fish
