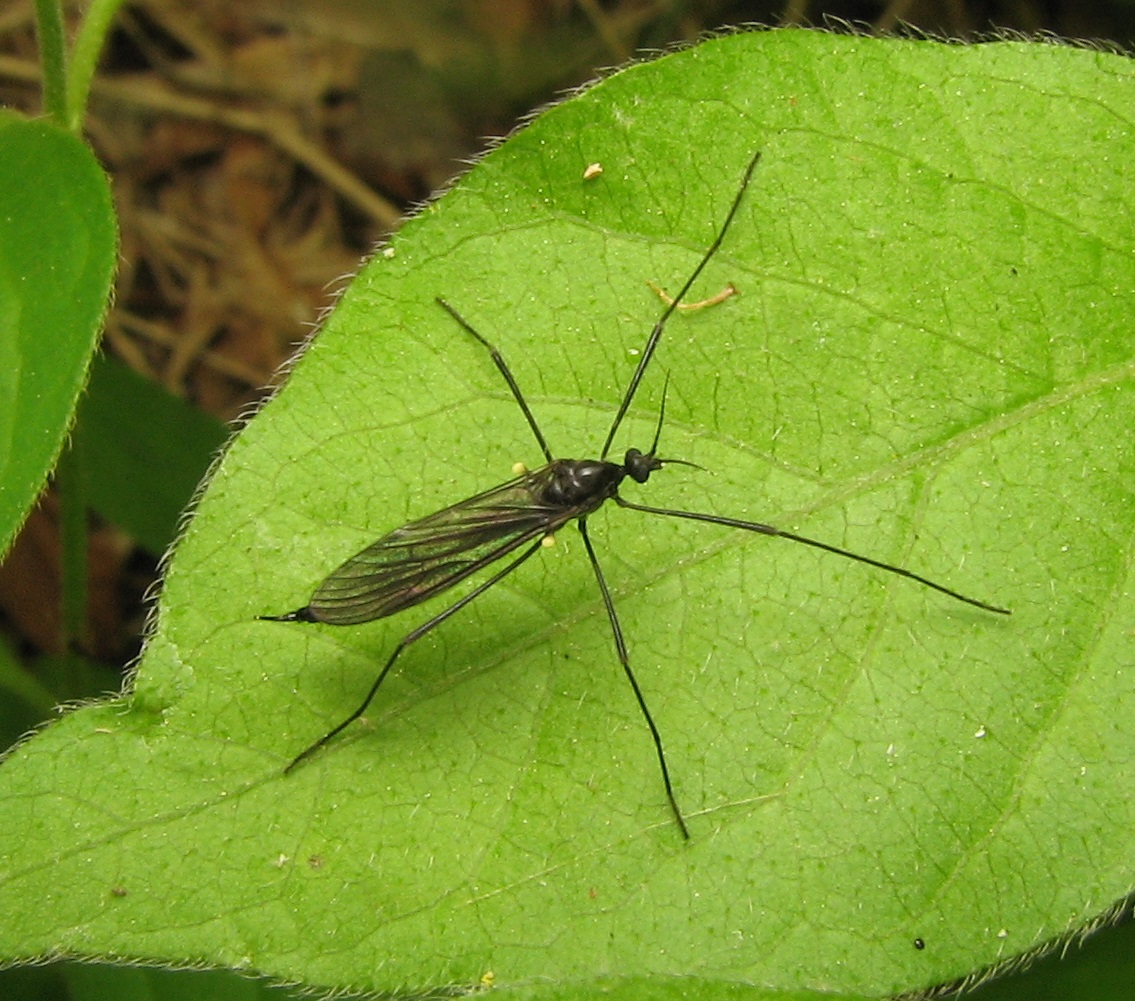

Scientific classification
- Domain: Eukaryota
- Kingdom: Animalia
- Phylum: Arthropoda
- Class: Insecta
- Order: Diptera
- Family: Limoniidae
- Genus: Gnophomyia
- Species: G. tristissima

Binomial name
- Gnophomyia tristissima Osten Sacken, 1859

= Gnophomyia tristissima =

Species of fly

Gnophomyia tristissima is a species of limoniid crane flies in the family Limoniidae. It is all black with yellow halteres.
