= Proteomyrus =

Proteomyrus Temporal range: Early- Middle Eocene

Scientific classification
- Domain: Eukaryota
- Kingdom: Animalia
- Phylum: Chordata
- Class: Actinopterygii
- Order: Anguilliformes
- Genus: †Proteomyrus; Cadrobbi, 1962

Proteomyrus is an extinct genus of prehistoric bony fish that lived from the early to middle Eocene.

== See also ==
- Prehistoric fish
- List of prehistoric bony fish
