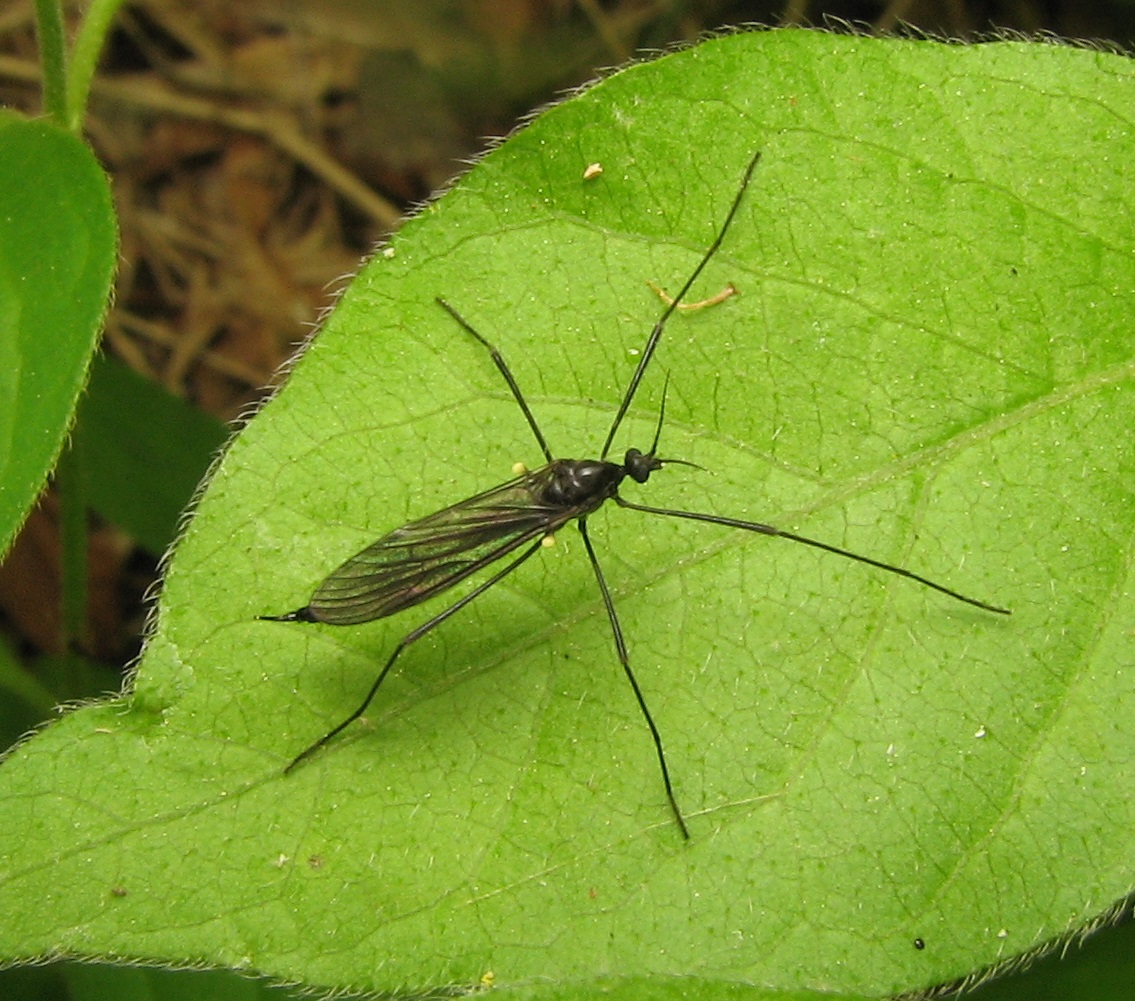
- Gnophomyia tristissima

Scientific classification
- Kingdom: Animalia
- Phylum: Arthropoda
- Class: Insecta
- Order: Diptera
- Family: Limoniidae
- Tribe: Eriopterini
- Genus: Gnophomyia; Osten Sacken, 1860

Type species
- Gnophomyia tristissima Osten Sacken, 1860

Species
- See text

= Gnophomyia =

Genus of flies

Gnophomyia is a genus of crane fly in the family Limoniidae.

== Species ==
- G. adjusta Alexander, 1949
- G. anaphora Alexander, 1954
- G. angusticellula Alexander, 1980
- G. apicularis Alexander, 1945
- G. arcuata Alexander, 1914
- G. argutula Alexander, 1944
- G. astuta Alexander, 1965
- G. axillaris Alexander, 1921
- G. banksiana Alexander, 1945
- G. bipectinata Alexander, 1965
- G. brevicellula Alexander, 1923
- G. bulbibasis Alexander, 1944
- G. caloptera Osten Sacken, 1888
- G. certa Alexander, 1952
- G. chilota Alexander, 1929
- G. cockerelli Alexander, 1919
- G. coxitalis Alexander, 1944
- G. cryptolabina Edwards, 1932
- G. ctenura Savchenko, 1976
- G. dejecta Alexander, 1929
- G. delectabilis Alexander, 1965
- G. diacaena Alexander, 1967
- G. diacantha Alexander, 1967
- G. diazi Alexander, 1937
- G. dictena Alexander, 1942
- G. digitiformis Alexander, 1941
- G. distifurcula Alexander, 1943
- G. duplex Alexander, 1937
- G. elsneri Stary, 1983
- G. emarginata Alexander, 1945
- G. eupetes Alexander, 1963
- G. ferruginea Williston, 1900
- G. fessa Alexander, 1944
- G. filiformis Alexander, 1930
- G. flaviclava Edwards, 1933
- G. flebilis Alexander, 1944
- G. fraterna Edwards, 1916
- G. fraternoides Alexander, 1927
- G. fuscocostalis Alexander, 1947
- G. glabritergata Alexander, 1965
- G. jacobsoni Alexander, 1927
- G. justa Alexander, 1938
- G. justoides Alexander, 1938
- G. kertesziana Alexander, 1930
- G. klossiana Alexander, 1942
- G. lachrymosa Alexander, 1919
- G. lata Alexander, 1943
- G. laticincta Alexander, 1919
- G. latilobata Alexander, 1949
- G. latissima Alexander, 1967
- G. longicellula Edwards, 1927
- G. longiterebra Alexander, 1943
- G. longitergata Alexander, 1943
- G. lugubris (Zetterstedt, 1838)
- G. macrocera Alexander, 1930
- G. maculipleura Edwards, 1916
- G. maestitia Alexander, 1914
- G. magica Alexander, 1945
- G. magniarcuata Alexander, 1949
- G. mediotuberculata Alexander, 1949
- G. molinae Alexander, 1930
- G. monophaea Alexander, 1946
- G. multiermis Alexander, 1956
- G. nahuelbutae Alexander, 1967
- G. nebulicincta Alexander, 1954
- G. nectarea Alexander, 1944
- G. neofraterna Alexander, 1950
- G. nigrescens Edwards, 1916
- G. nigrina (Wiedemann, 1828)
- G. nimbifera Alexander, 1943
- G. nitens Edwards, 1933
- G. nycteris Alexander, 1924
- G. obesula Alexander, 1931
- G. orientalis de Meijere, 1911
- G. ostensackeni Skuse, 1890
- G. oxymera Alexander, 1943
- G. pallidapex Alexander, 1929
- G. pauciseta Alexander, 1949
- G. peracutior Alexander, 1949
- G. perdebilis Alexander, 1949
- G. perlata Alexander, 1944
- G. permagica Alexander, 1947
- G. persevera Alexander, 1949
- G. petentis Alexander, 1949
- G. platystyla Alexander, 1979
- G. podacantha Alexander, 1944
- G. porteri Alexander, 1930
- G. propatula Alexander, 1947
- G. pulvinaris Alexander, 1945
- G. quartaria (Brunetti, 1913)
- G. regnatrix Alexander, 1943
- G. rubicundula Alexander, 1921
- G. sagitta Alexander, 1949
- G. sagittoides Alexander, 1951
- G. similis Edwards, 1916
- G. socialis Alexander, 1949
- G. spinibasis Alexander, 1943
- G. stenochorema Alexander, 1962
- G. stenophallus Alexander, 1941
- G. stupens (Walker, 1861)
- G. stylacuta Alexander, 1947
- G. subapicularis Alexander, 1945
- G. subarcuata Alexander, 1946
- G. subflebilis Alexander, 1949
- G. subhyalina Alexander, 1913
- G. subnimbifera Alexander, 1967
- G. subobliterata Alexander, 1946
- G. suffusibasis Alexander, 1980
- G. teleneura Alexander, 1944
- G. tetracaena Alexander, 1967
- G. tiresias Alexander, 1949
- G. toleranda Alexander, 1955
- G. toschiae Alexander, 1966
- G. transversa Alexander, 1949
- G. triatrata Alexander, 1968
- G. tricepoides Alexander, 1967
- G. triceps Alexander, 1947
- G. tricornis Alexander, 1949
- G. trilobata Alexander, 1980
- G. trisetigera Alexander, 1949
- G. tristissima Osten Sacken, 1860
- G. tuber Alexander, 1944
- G. tungurahuana Alexander, 1946
- G. vanitas Alexander, 1950
- G. vilis Alexander, 1931
- G. viridipennis (Gimmerthal, 1847)
- G. vitripennis Alexander, 1942
