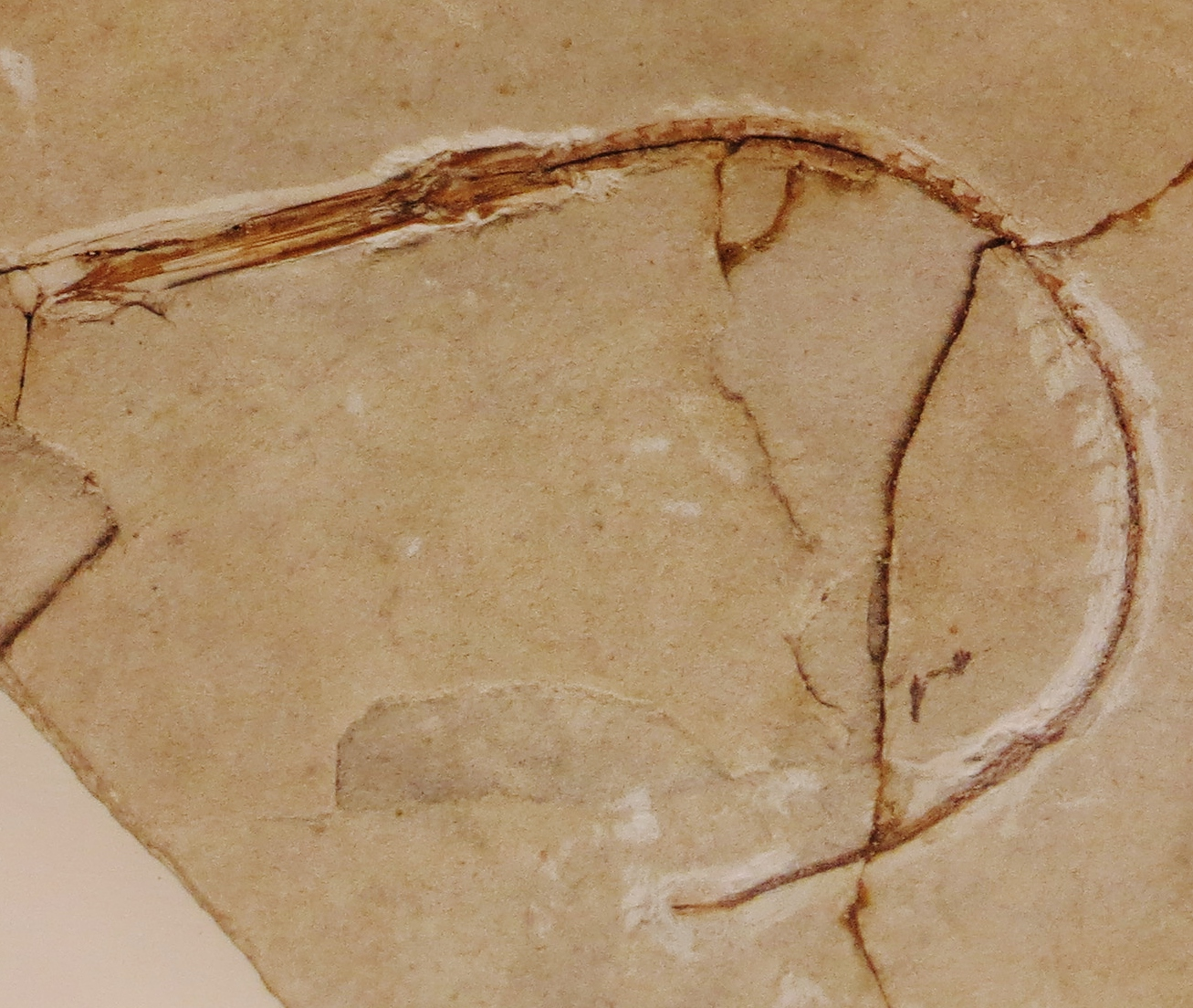
- Fossil

Scientific classification
- Kingdom: Animalia
- Phylum: Chordata
- Class: Actinopterygii
- Genus: †Urosphen; Agassiz, 1835

= Urosphen =

Urosphen Temporal range: Early- Middle Eocene

Urosphen is an extinct genus of prehistoric bony fish that lived from the early to middle Eocene.

== See also ==
- Prehistoric fish
- List of prehistoric bony fish
