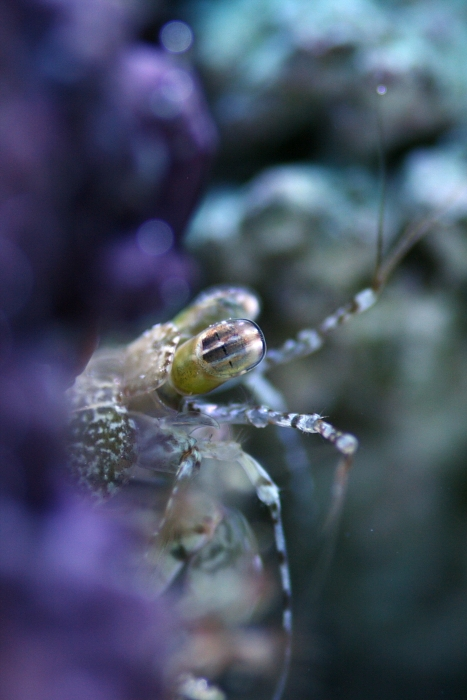

Scientific classification
- Domain: Eukaryota
- Kingdom: Animalia
- Phylum: Arthropoda
- Class: Malacostraca
- Order: Stomatopoda
- Family: Pseudosquillidae
- Genus: Pseudosquilla; Dana, 1852
- Species: P. ciliata

Binomial name
- Pseudosquilla ciliata (Fabricius, 1787)

Synonyms
- Squilla ciliata Fabricius, 1787; Squilla quadrispinosa Eydoux & Souleyet, 1842; Squilla stylifera Lamarck, 1818

= Pseudosquilla ciliata =

Species of crustacean

Pseudosquilla ciliata, the common mantis shrimp, is a species of mantis shrimp, known by common names including rainbow mantis shrimp and false mantis shrimp. It is widespread in the tropical Indo-Pacific region and in both the western and eastern Atlantic Ocean.

== Description ==
P. ciliata can be distinguished from other closely related mantis shrimps by several characteristics; the eye is cylindrical with a hemispherical cornea; the rostral plate lacks a small spine at the front; the carapace does not bear large black spots; the telson has three keel-like ridges on either side of a central ridge; and the base of each uropod terminates in two slender flattened spines, the innermost of which is the shorter.

The colour of P. ciliata varies greatly depending on an individual's environment; for example, P. ciliata living in a sea grass flat will often turn green, while one living in coralline algae will often turn red. P. ciliata may reach a total length of 95 millimetres (3.7 in). The colour can range from yellowish to near black and may be plain, marbled or striped. There is often a dark patch on the last thoracic segment and first abdominal segment and another one on the edge of the telson just behind the intermediate spine on abdominal segment six.

== Distribution and habitat ==
P. ciliata has a widespread distribution in shallow seas across the tropical Indo-Pacific region and on both sides of the Atlantic Ocean. It is found burrowing in sandy and muddy areas and in seagrass meadows. It is also found on coral rubble, under boulders and on rocky reef flats. Its depth range is from the lower shore down to a depth of at least 86 m (282 ft).

== Biology ==
P. ciliata usually remains in its burrow during the day and emerges at night to forage. It is a predator and feeds on small fish, worms and small crustaceans, particularly shrimps.

== Use in aquaria ==
P. ciliata is sometimes kept in reef aquaria where it is hardy and safe with larger gastropods and crabs. A sand base to the tank will give it an opportunity to dig the U-shaped burrow in which it likes to spend its day.
