= Milananguilla =

Milananguilla Temporal range: Early- Middle Eocene

Scientific classification
- Kingdom: Animalia
- Phylum: Chordata
- Class: Actinopterygii
- Order: Anguilliformes
- Genus: †Milananguilla; Blot, 1978

Extinct bony fish genus

Milananguilla is an extinct genus of prehistoric bony fish that lived from the early to middle Eocene.

== See also ==
- Prehistoric fish
- List of prehistoric bony fish
