= Xiphopterus =

Xiphopterus Temporal range: Early- Middle Eocene

Scientific classification
- Kingdom: Animalia
- Phylum: Chordata
- Class: Actinopterygii
- Order: Scombriformes
- Family: Scombridae
- Genus: †Xiphopterus; Agassiz, 1835

Extinct genus of fishes

Xiphopterus is an extinct genus of prehistoric perciform fish that lived from the early to middle Eocene.

== See also ==
- Prehistoric fish
- List of prehistoric bony fish
