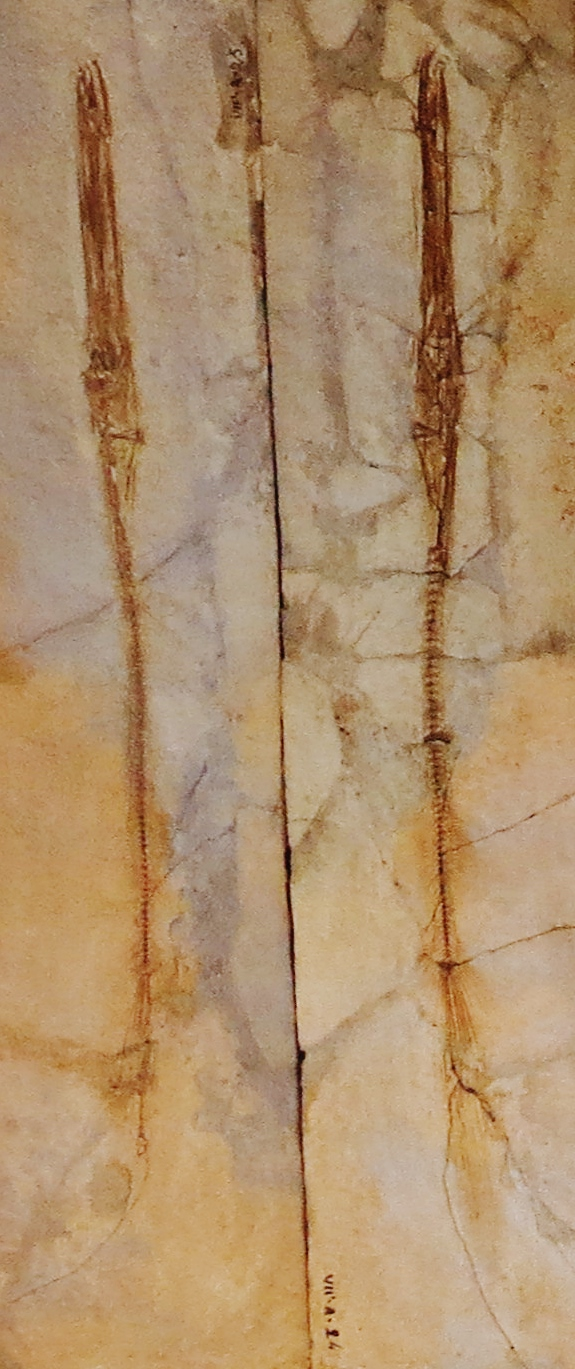
- Parasynarcualis longirostris

Scientific classification
- Kingdom: Animalia
- Phylum: Chordata
- Class: Actinopterygii
- Order: Gasterosteiformes
- Genus: †Parasynarcualis; Blot 1981

= Parasynarcualis =

Parasynarcualis Temporal range: Early- Middle Eocene

Extinct genus of fishes

Parasynarcualis is an extinct genus of prehistoric bony fish that lived from the early to middle Eocene.
