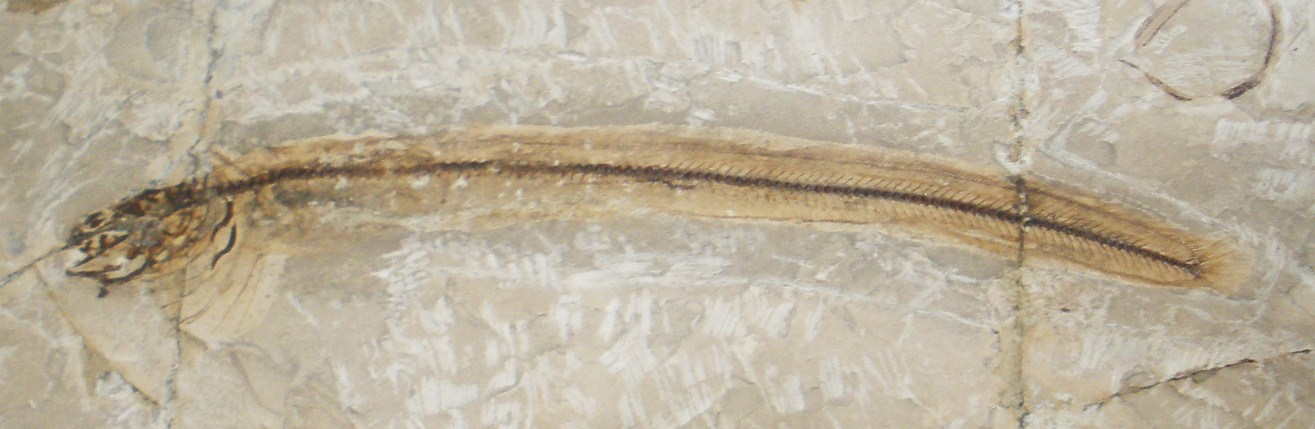
- Fossil of Veronanguilla, an extinct fish - took the photo at Museo di Storia Naturale di Milano

Scientific classification
- Domain: Eukaryota
- Kingdom: Animalia
- Phylum: Chordata
- Class: Actinopterygii
- Order: Anguilliformes
- Genus: †Veronanguilla; Blot, 1978

= Veronanguilla =

Veronanguilla Temporal range: Early- Middle Eocene

Veronanguilla is an extinct genus of prehistoric bony fish that lived from the early to middle Eocene.

== See also ==
- Prehistoric fish
- List of prehistoric bony fish
