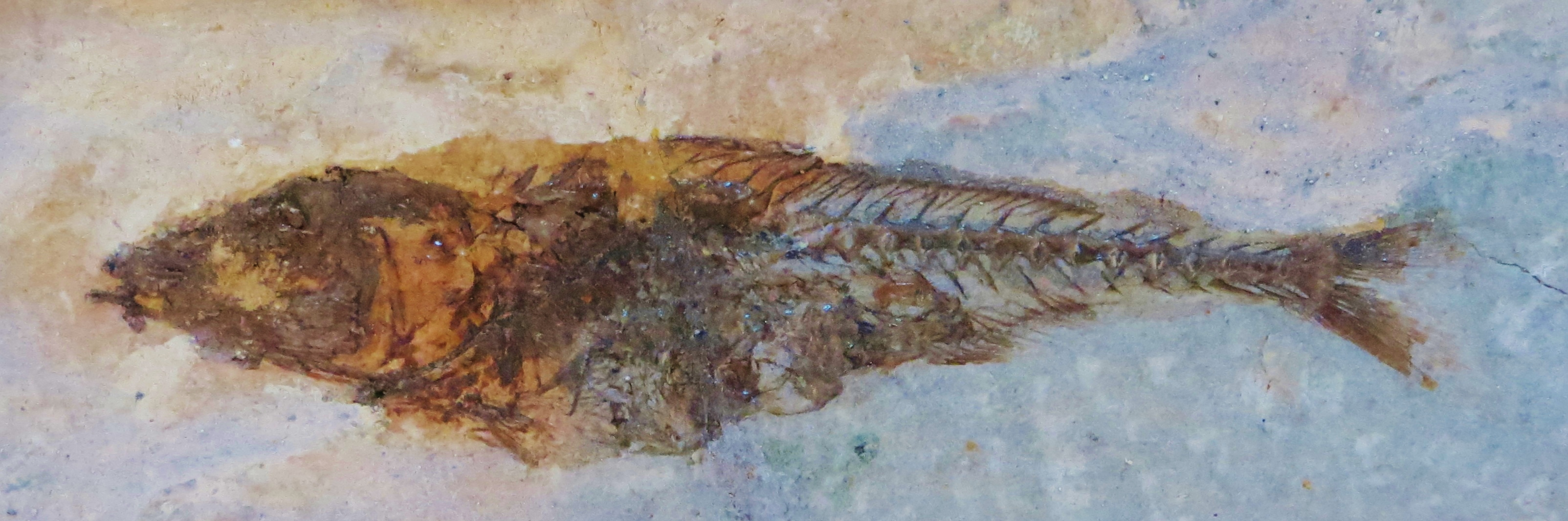
- Specimen at Teylers Museum

Scientific classification
- Kingdom: Animalia
- Phylum: Chordata
- Class: Actinopterygii
- Order: Carangiformes
- Suborder: Carangoidei
- Family: †Ductoridae; Blot, 1969
- Genus: †Ductor; Agassiz, 1834
- Species: †D. vestenae

Binomial name
- †Ductor vestenae (Volta, 1796)

Synonyms
- Ductor leptosomus Agassiz, 1834

= Ductor =

Ductor Temporal range: Early Eocene

Extinct genus of fishes

Ductor (Latin for "leader", referencing its resemblance and potential relation to the pilotfish, Naucrates ductor) is an extinct genus of prehistoric marine ray-finned fish that lived during the early Eocene. It contains a single species, D. vestenae, known from the famous Monte Bolca site of Italy. It is the only member of the family Ductoridae. It is the earliest representative of the suborder Echeneoidei, and is thought to be most closely related to cobias and dolphinfish.

== See also ==
- Prehistoric fish
- List of prehistoric bony fish
