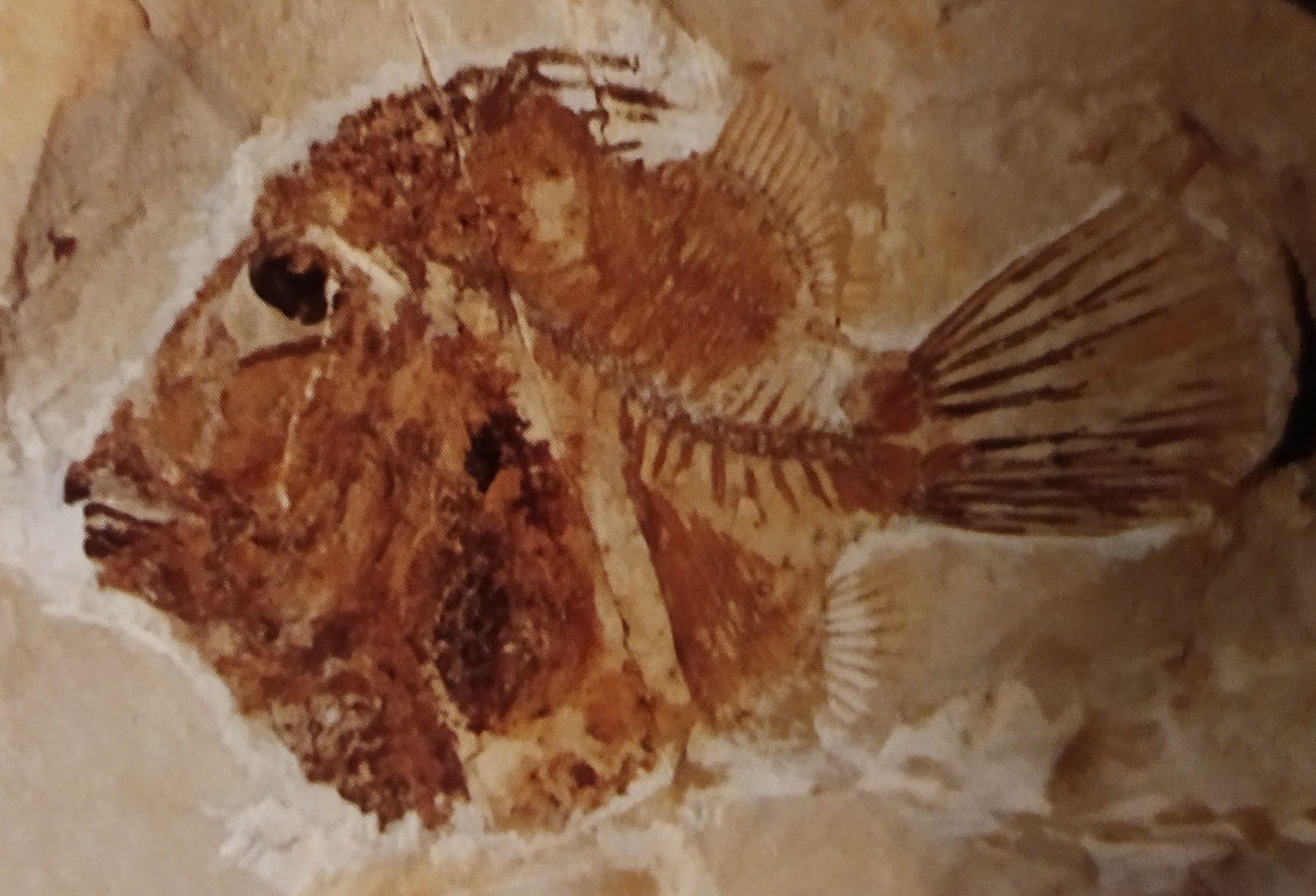
- Fossil specimen, Museo di Storia Naturale Verona

Scientific classification
- Kingdom: Animalia
- Phylum: Chordata
- Class: Actinopterygii
- Order: Tetraodontiformes
- Family: †Eoplectidae
- Genus: †Eoplectus; Tyler, 1973
- Species: †E. bloti

Binomial name
- †Eoplectus bloti Tyler, 1973

= Eoplectus =

Eoplectus Temporal range: Early Eocene

Extinct genus of fishes

Eoplectus is an extinct genus of prehistoric marine tetraodontiform fish that lived during the Eocene. It contains a single species, E. bloti from the Early Eocene-aged Monte Bolca site of Italy. It is the only member of the family Eoplectidae. It closely resembled pufferfishes and porcupinefishes, which it was related to.

It displays some unique morphological traits among tetraodontiforms, that support it being a basal member of the Tetraodontoidei.

== See also ==
- Prehistoric fish
- List of prehistoric bony fish
