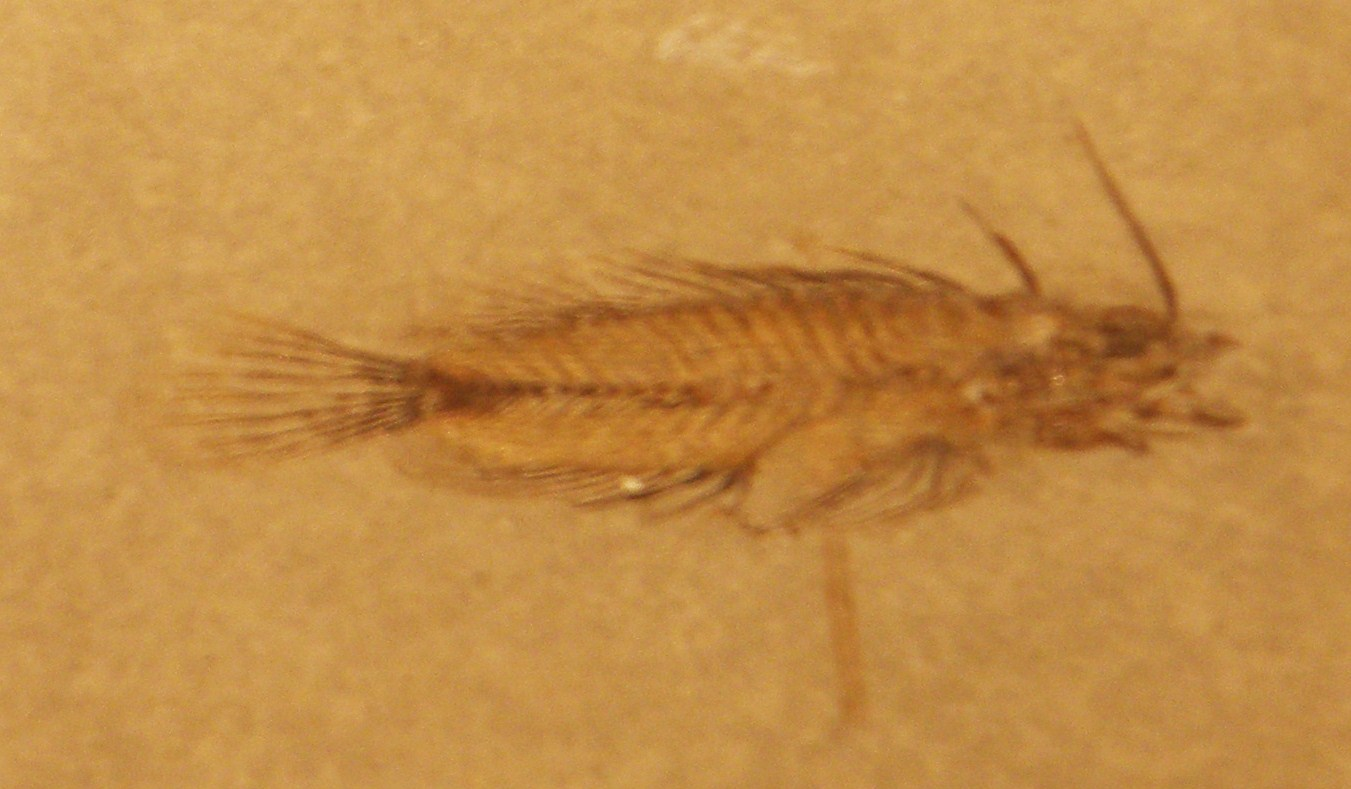
- Pterygocephalus paradoxus

Scientific classification
- Kingdom: Animalia
- Phylum: Chordata
- Class: Actinopterygii
- Genus: †Pterygocephalus; Agassiz, 1835

= Pterygocephalus =

Pterygocephalus Temporal range: Early- Middle Eocene

Pterygocephalus is an extinct genus of prehistoric bony fish that lived from the early to middle Eocene.

== See also ==
- Prehistoric fish
- List of prehistoric bony fish
