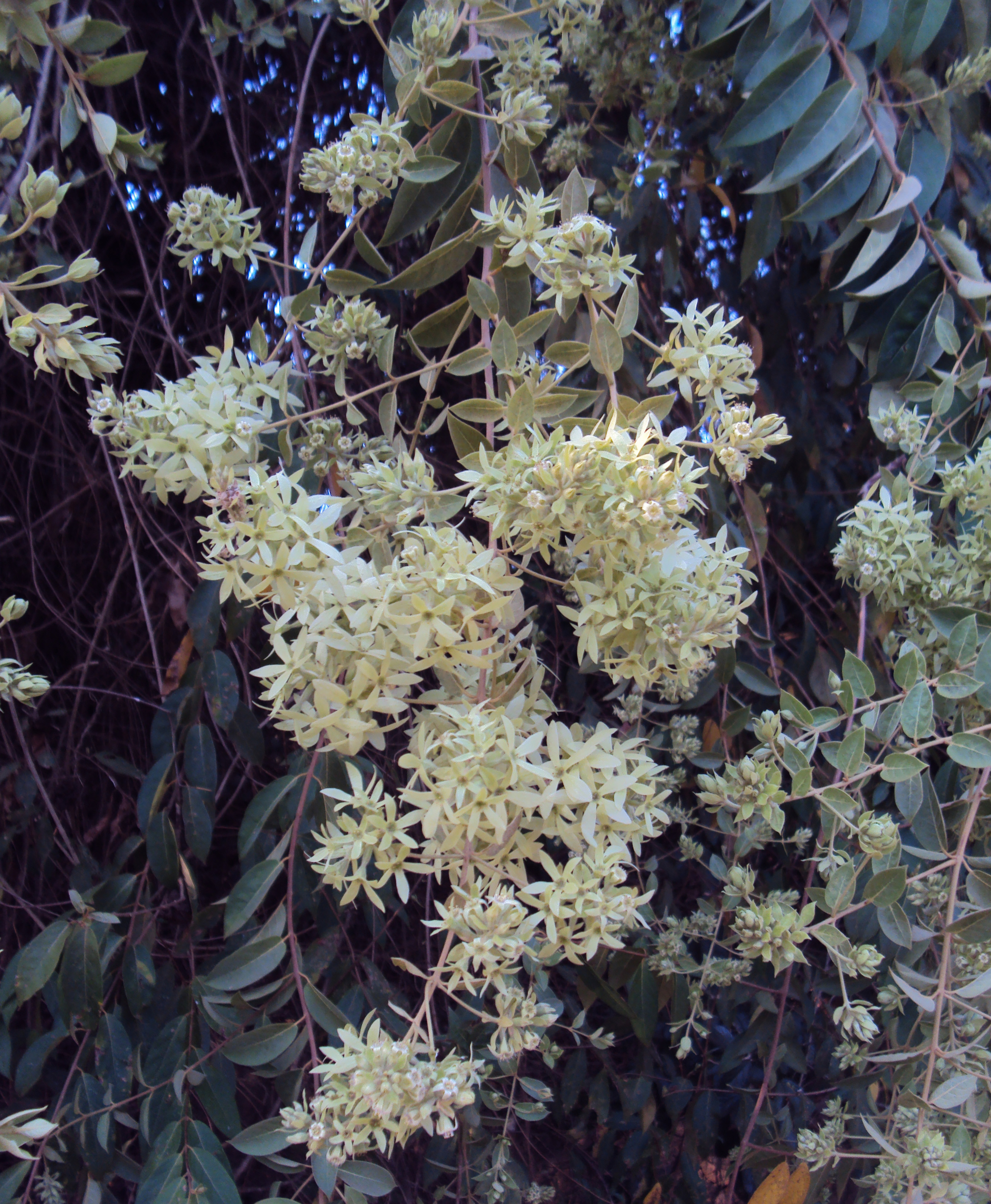

Scientific classification
- Kingdom: Plantae
- Clade: Embryophytes
- Clade: Tracheophytes
- Clade: Angiosperms
- Clade: Eudicots
- Clade: Rosids
- Order: Myrtales
- Family: Combretaceae
- Genus: Getonia; Roxb.
- Species: G. floribunda

Binomial name
- Getonia floribunda Roxb.

Synonyms
- Calycopteris floribunda (Roxb.) Lam. ex Poir.; Calycopteris nutans (Roxb.) Kurz; Calycopteris nutans var. glabriuscula Kurz; Calycopteris nutans var. roxburghii Kurz; Combretum sericeum (Walp.) Wall. ex C.B. Clarke; Getonia nitida Roth; Getonia nutans Roxb.; Poivrea sericea Walp.

= Getonia =

Genus of plants

Getonia is a monotypic genus of flowering plants belonging to the family Combretaceae. The only species is Getonia floribunda, commonly known as ukshi. Its native range is India, Assam to Peninsular Malaysia.

== Description ==
Getonia floribunda is a large climbing shrub which is 5–10 m long, with vines that are about 5–10 cm in diameter, the stem and leaves are said to have medicinal properties. Ukshi is found extensively in the low-lying tropical evergreen forests of the Western Ghats, and rarely in Eastern Ghats of coastal Andhra. These are also found in "Kavus" or the Sacred Groves of Kerala. Commonly known as kokkarai in Hindi, Minnarakoti in Tamil, Adivijama, in Telugu. The plant is also grown in central and southern parts of India

It bears grey bark and tenuous branches with thick fluff on the surface. The keratinous leaves, ovoid or oval, are 5–12 cm long. New branches are hairy and rust coloured. The flowers occur in dense clusters are the end of branches. The bracts of the small flowers are ovoid or oval, with thick fluffs on the surface. Petals are absent and the 10 stamens are arranged in 2 cycles.

The fruit inception bears 1 ventricle and 3 pendulous ovules inside. The fluffy sham-winged fruit, which is about 8 mm long, has 5 edges and 5 persistent calices which enlarges into the fluffy wing 10–14 mm in length. The sepals are prominent, hairy and green.

=== Uses ===
Ukshi is revered as a life-saver by the forest dwellers who regularly depend on this vine during summer when streams dry up. Sections of the vine store water, which people often use to quench their thirst.

The leaves are bitter, astringent, laxative, anthelmintic, depurative, diaphoretic and febrifuge. They are useful in intestinal worms, colic, leprosy, malarial fever, dysentery, ulcers and vomiting. The fruits are useful in jaundice, ulcers, pruritus and skin diseases.
