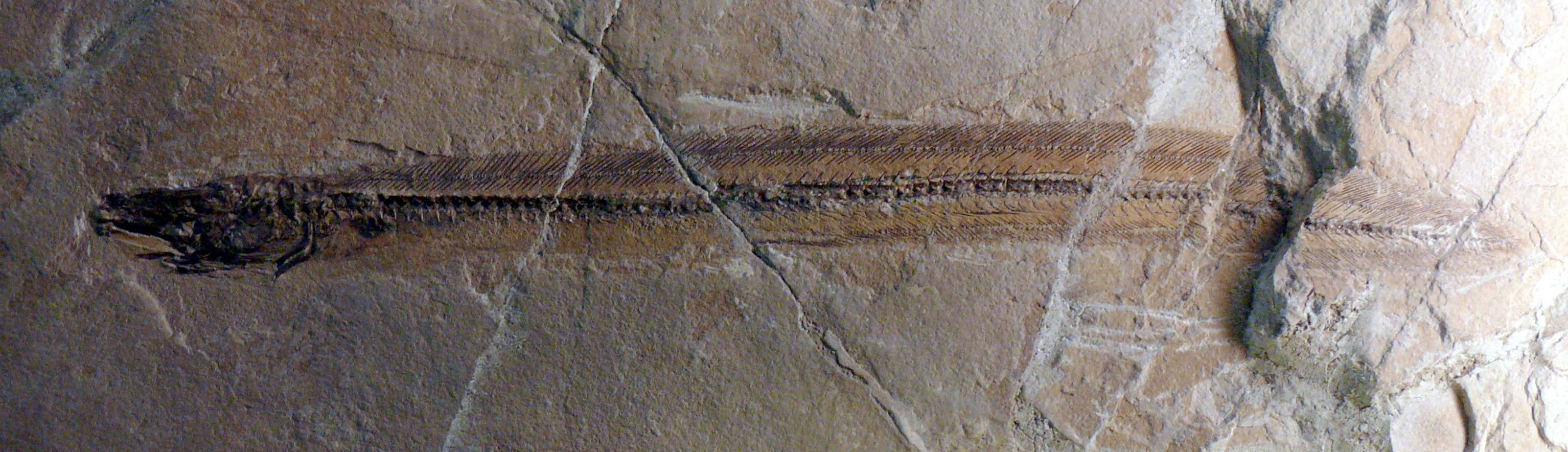
- Fossil specimen

Scientific classification
- Kingdom: Animalia
- Phylum: Chordata
- Class: Actinopterygii
- Order: Anguilliformes
- Family: †Paranguillidae
- Genus: †Paranguilla; Bleeker, 1864
- Species: †P. tigrina

Binomial name
- †Paranguilla tigrina Agassiz, 1839

= Paranguilla =

Paranguilla Temporal range: Lutetian

Extinct prehistoric eel that lived during the Lutetian epoch of the Eocene

Paranguilla tigrina is an extinct prehistoric eel that lived during the Lutetian epoch of the Eocene, in what is now Monte Bolca.

Some of the better preserved fossils show that the living animals had complex patterns of spots. P. tigrina and Dalpiazella brevicauda constitute the extinct family Paranguillidae.

== See also ==
- Prehistoric fish
- List of prehistoric bony fish
