= Synhypuralis =

Synhypuralis Temporal range: Early- Middle Eocene

Scientific classification
- Domain: Eukaryota
- Kingdom: Animalia
- Phylum: Chordata
- Class: Actinopterygii
- Order: Gasterosteiformes
- Genus: Synhypuralis; Blot 1981

Extinct genus of fishes

Synhypuralis is an extinct genus of prehistoric bony fish that lived from the early to middle Eocene.
