= Paraeoliscus =

Paraeoliscus Temporal range: Early- Middle Eocene

Scientific classification
- Domain: Eukaryota
- Kingdom: Animalia
- Phylum: Chordata
- Class: Actinopterygii
- Order: Gasterosteiformes
- Genus: †Paraeoliscus; Blot 1981

Extinct genus of ray-finned fishes

Paraeoliscus is an extinct genus of ray-finned fish that lived from the early to middle Eocene.
