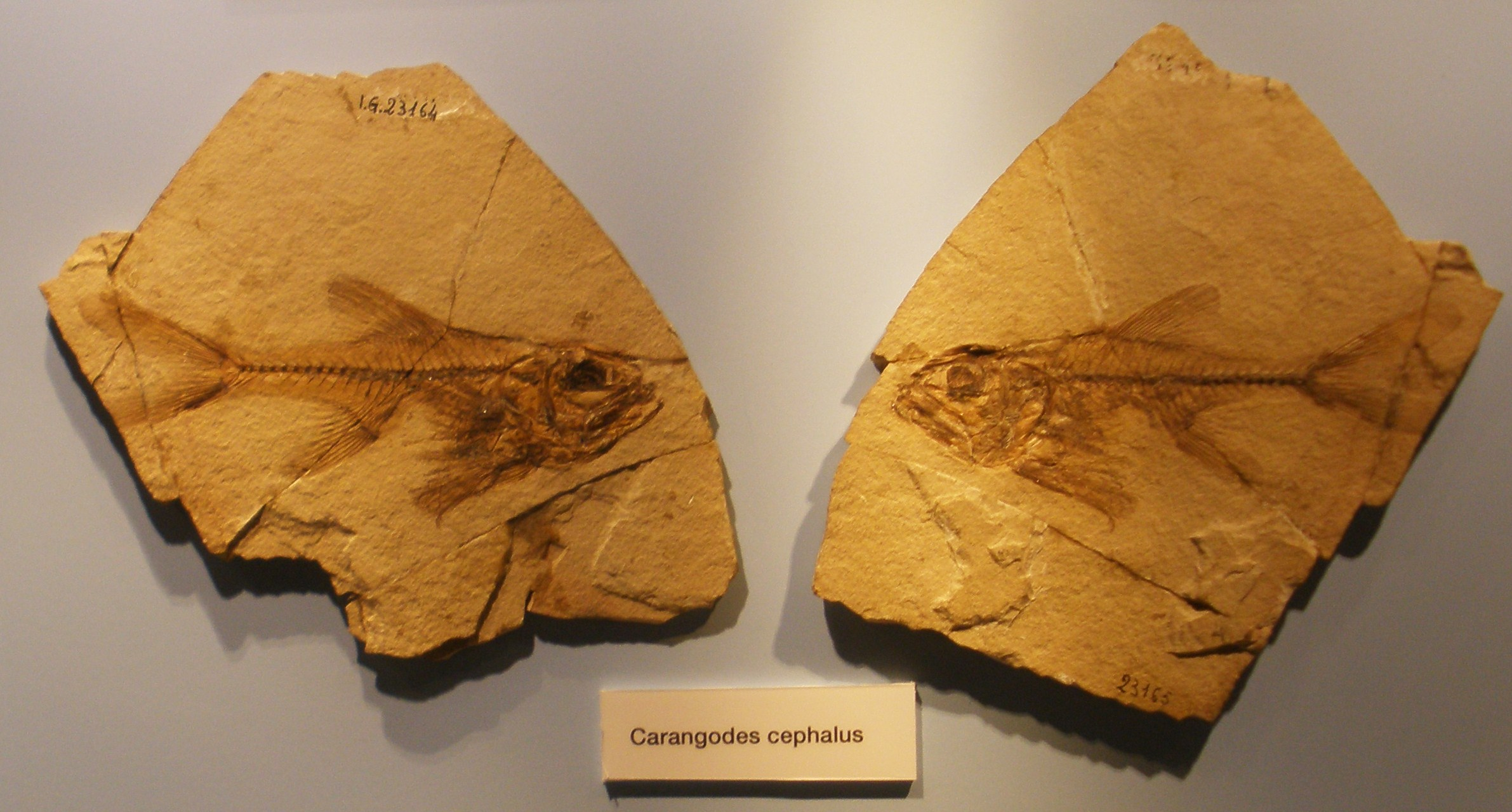

Scientific classification
- Kingdom: Animalia
- Phylum: Chordata
- Class: Actinopterygii
- Order: Scombriformes
- Family: †Carangodidae; Blot, 1969
- Genus: †Carangodes; Heckel, 1856
- Species: †C. bicornis

Binomial name
- †Carangodes bicornis (Volta, 1796)

Synonyms
- †C. cephalus Heckel, 1856

= Carangodes =

Carangodes Temporal range: Early Eocene

Genus of fishes (fossil)

Carangodes is an extinct genus of prehistoric ray-finned fish that lived during the early Eocene. It contains a single species, C. bicornis, from the famous Monte Bolca site in Italy. It is the only known member of the extinct scombriform family Carangodidae.

== See also ==
- Prehistoric fish
- List of prehistoric bony fish
