= Patavichthys =

Patavichthys Temporal range: Early- Middle Eocene

Scientific classification
- Domain: Eukaryota
- Kingdom: Animalia
- Phylum: Chordata
- Class: Actinopterygii
- Order: Anguilliformes
- Genus: †Patavichthys; Blot, 1981

Patavichthys is an extinct genus of prehistoric ray-finned fish that lived from the early to middle Eocene.

== See also ==
- Prehistoric fish
- List of prehistoric bony fish
