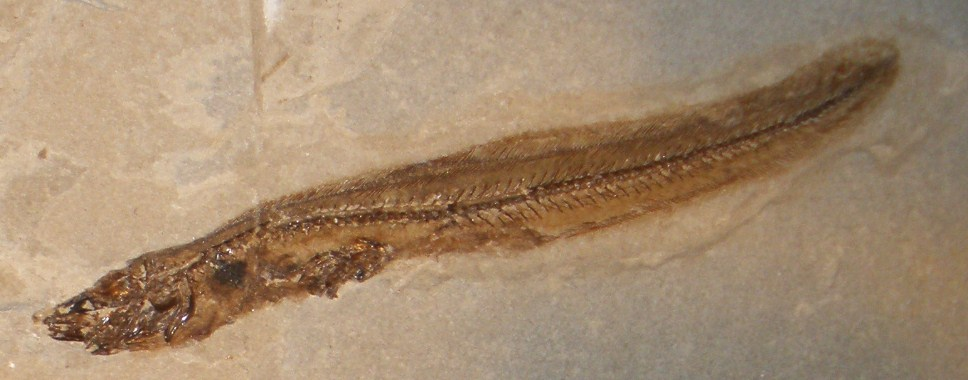
- Fossil of D. brevicauda

Scientific classification
- Domain: Eukaryota
- Kingdom: Animalia
- Phylum: Chordata
- Class: Actinopterygii
- Order: Anguilliformes
- Family: †Paranguillidae
- Genus: †Dalpiazella; Cadrobi, 1962
- Species: †D. brevicauda

Binomial name
- †Dalpiazella brevicauda Cadrobi, 1962

Synonyms
- †Dalpiaziella (alternate spelling)

= Dalpiazella =

Dalpiazella Temporal range: Late Ypresian

Extinct genus of fishes

Dalpiazella (also spelled Dalpiaziella) is an extinct genus of prehistoric marine eel from the Eocene of Europe. It contains a single species, D. brevicauda, from the late Ypresian-aged Monte Bolca lagerstatten of Italy. It is thought to be closely related to the sympatric genus Paranguilla, with both genera together constituting the family Paranguillidae.

== See also ==
- Prehistoric fish
- List of prehistoric bony fish
