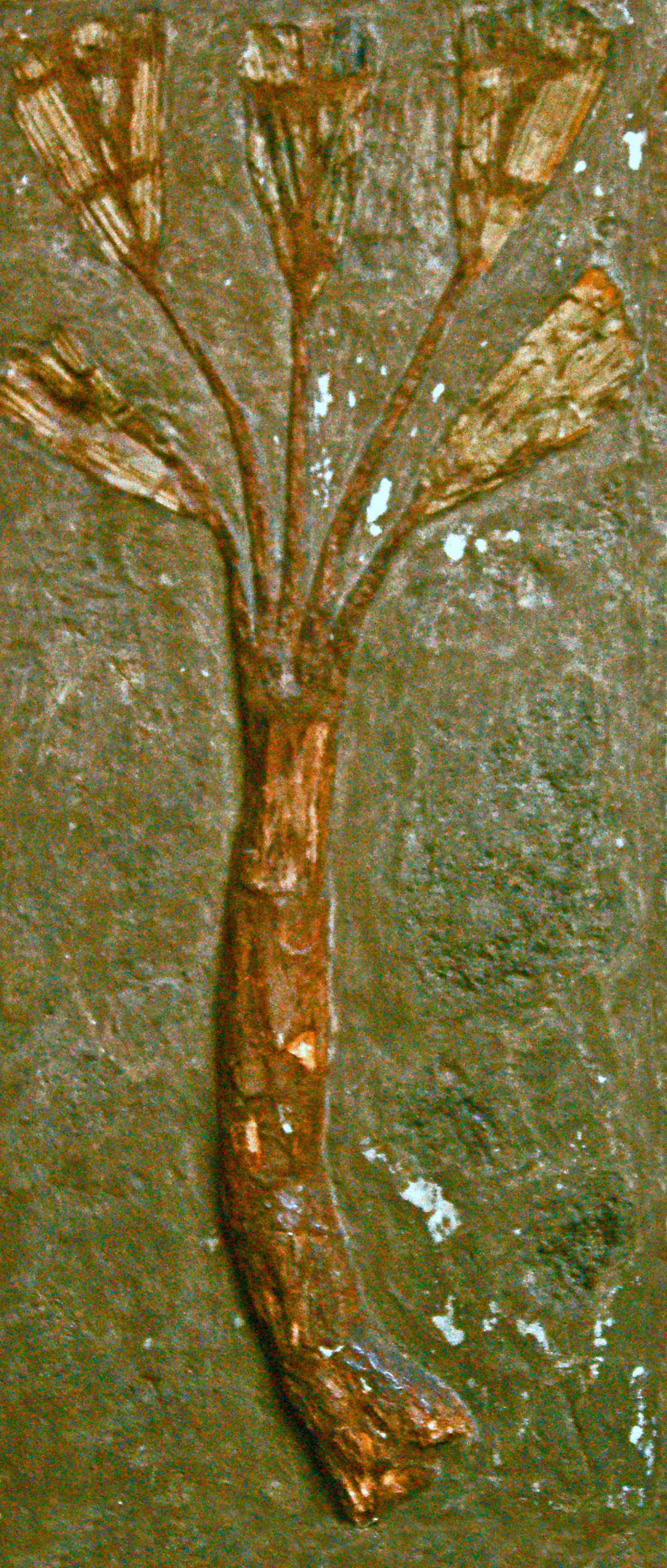
- Fossil of Latanites praticinensis from Bolca

Scientific classification
- Kingdom: Plantae
- Clade: Tracheophytes
- Clade: Angiosperms
- Clade: Monocots
- Clade: Commelinids
- Order: Arecales
- Family: Arecaceae
- Genus: †Latanites; Massalongo

= Latanites =

Latanites Temporal range: Eocene - Oligocene

Extinct genus of flowering plants

Latanites is an extinct genus of plants belonging to the family Arecaceae.

== Fossil record ==
Fossil palms of this genus are dating back to the Middle Eocene and to the Early-Middle Oligocene (between 50 and 30 million years ago). They have been found in the famous deposits of Bolca and other nearby sites. The giant Latanites maximiliani could reach a high of more than three meters.
