= Pseudosyngnathus =

Pseudosyngnathus Temporal range: Early- Middle Eocene

Scientific classification
- Kingdom: Animalia
- Phylum: Chordata
- Class: Actinopterygii
- Order: Gasterosteiformes
- Genus: †Pseudosyngnathus; Kner and Steindachner 1863

Extinct genus of fishes

Pseudosyngnathus is an extinct genus of prehistoric bony fish that lived from the early to middle Eocene.
