= 2017 in paleoichthyology =

This list of fossil fishes described in 2017 is a list of new taxa of jawless vertebrates, placoderms, acanthodians, fossil cartilaginous fishes, bony fishes and other fishes of every kind that are scheduled to be described during the year 2017, as well as other significant discoveries and events related to paleontology of fishes that are scheduled to occur in the year 2017. The list only includes taxa at the level of genus or species.

== Research ==
- A study on the marine fish extinction rates during background and mass extinctions from the Permian through Early Jurassic, compared with extinction trajectories of marine invertebrates, is published by Vázquez & Clapham (2017).
- A study on the ecological diversity and lifestyles of thelodonts as indicated by their squamation patterns is published by Ferrón & Botella (2017).
- A study on the phylogenetic relationships of jawless fish assigned to Cyathaspididae and Pteraspidiformes is published by Randle & Sansom (2017).
- A study on the phylogenetic relationships of members of the group Pteraspidiformes is published by Randle & Sansom (2017).
- New material of Cornovichthys blaauweni and Achanarella trewini is described from the Devonian of Scotland by van der Brugghen (2017), who considers both species to represent the same euphaneropid taxon, which he considers to be a member of the genus Euphanerops belonging or related to the species Euphanerops longaevus.
- A study on the phylogenetic relationships of early jawed vertebrates, indicating that placoderms are a monophyletic group, is published by King et al. (2017).
- A study on the morphology of the gill arches of the type specimen of Paraplesiobatis heinrichsi is published by Brazeau et al. (2017).
- Description of the anatomy of a three-dimensionally preserved skull of the placoderm Romundina stellina is published by Dupret et al. (2017).
- A study on the putative dental plate of Romundina stellina described by Rücklin & Donoghue (2015) is published by Smith et al. (2017), who reject the interpretation of the specimen as a dental plate.
- A redescription of Bothriolepis jeremejevi Rohon (1900) from the Devonian (Famennian) Sosnogorsk Formation (Komi Republic, Russia) is published by Lukševičs, Beznosov & Stūris (2017), who rerank this taxon as a subspecies of Bothriolepis leptocheira.
- A study on the plates of armour of arthrodire placoderms from the Devonian (Emsian) of Morocco, evaluating whether their differences can be considered distinctive between species, is published by Antczak & Berkowski (2017).
- A description of a nearly complete specimen of Titanichthys from the Devonian Cleveland Shale and a study on the phylogenetic relationships of the taxon is published by Boyle & Ryan (2017).
- Redescription of the Devonian arthrodire species Szelepis yunnanensis, a revision of the fossil material attributed to members of this species and a study on the phylogenetic relationships of the species is published by Dupret, Zhu & Wang (2017).
- A study on the placoderm jaw morphology and function based on data from a buchanosteid specimen from the Early Devonian limestones (~400 Ma) at Burrinjuck, near Canberra (Australia), is published by Hu, Lu & Young (2017).
- A study on the relationship between the locomotory patterns and the morphological variability of the tail fins in extant sharks, and its implications for the possible morphology of the tail fin of Dunkleosteus terrelli is published by Ferrón, Martínez-Pérez & Botella (2017).
- A study on the sequence of ossification of skeletal elements in the growth series of the acanthodian Acanthodes lopatini from the lower Tournaisian of Siberia (Russia) is published by Beznosov (2017).
- A study on the anatomy of the jaws of the Devonian ischnacanthiform acanthodian species Euryacanthus rugosus and Tricuspicanthus gannitus, as well as its implications for jaw and tooth occlusion in these taxa, is published by Blais (2017).
- A study on the morphological and histological changes of scales during ontogeny in the acanthodian Triazeugacanthus affinis is published by Chevrinais, Sire & Cloutier (2017).
- Chevrinais, Sire & Cloutier (2017) describe the ontogeny of Triazeugacanthus affinis and compare it to the ontogeny of other "acanthodians", cartilaginous fishes and bony fishes.
- A study on the anatomy of the pectoral region of the skeleton of Doliodus problematicus is published by Maisey et al. (2017).
- A study on the phylogenetic relationships of the Devonian (Emsian) species "Ctenacanthus" latispinosus is published by Burrow et al. (2017), who transfer this species to the genus Doliodus.
- A study on the diversity and relative abundance of fish from the Late Cretaceous (late Santonian) Milk River Formation (Alberta, Canada) is published by Brinkman, Neuman & Divay (2017).
- A study on the phylogenetic relationships of Palaeospondylus gunni is published by Johanson et al. (2017), who interpret the species as a stem-cartilaginous fish.
- Partial braincases of two gigantic ctenacanthiform sharks, estimated to attain lengths up to 7 m and body weights of 1500–2500 kg, are described from the Carboniferous (Upper Pennsylvanian) Finis Shale (Texas, United States) by Maisey et al. (2017).
- A study on the anatomy of the braincase of a Permian cartilaginous fish Dwykaselachus oosthuizeni is published by Coates et al. (2017).
- Partial skeleton of a non-marine elasmobranch of uncertain phylogenetic placement is described from the Late Jurassic Talbragar Fossil Fish Bed (Australia) by Turner & Avery (2017).
- A hybodontiform tooth and a euselachian dermal denticle are described from the Permian (Wuchiapingian) of Hydra Island (Greece) by Argyriou et al. (2017).
- A reappraisal of the type and newly discovered fossil material of the hybodontoid Reticulodus synergus from Upper Triassic strata in Arizona, Utah and New Mexico (United States) and a study on the heterodonty in this species is published by Voris & Heckert (2017).
- A study on the impact of the Cretaceous–Paleogene extinction event on the ecological diversity of the mackerel sharks is published by Belben et al. (2017).
- A study on the environment in the area corresponding to the present-day Amazon basin in the Miocene as indicated by data from the shark and ray fossils from the Pirabas Formation (Brazil) is published by Aguilera et al. (2017).
- Evidence for the existence of regional endothermy in otodontid and cretoxyrhinid sharks is presented by Ferrón (2017).
- Bite marks on fossil marine mammal bones from the Miocene Pisco Formation (Peru), attributed to Carcharocles megalodon, are described by Collareta et al. (2017).
- Shark assemblage consisting mainly of the teeth of small (probably juvenile) specimens of the copper shark (Carcharhinus brachyurus), interpreted as a secondary nursery area for copper sharks, is described from the Miocene Pisco Formation (Peru) by Landini et al. (2017).
- A study on the methods which can be used to support taxonomic identifications of fossil sharks known from isolated teeth is published by Marramà & Kriwet (2017), who consider fossil sand tiger shark genus Brachycarcharias to be distinct from the genus Lamna.
- A study on the morphology of the cushion-shaped tooth-bearing plates from the Silurian of Estonia attributed to Lophosteus superbus, as well as on tooth addition, shedding and replacement in this taxon, is published by Chen et al. (2017).
- Redescription of the Permian ray-finned fish Elonichthys fritschi is published by Schindler (2017), who presents the first reconstruction of the skull of this species.
- Fish belonging to the extinct group Scanilepiformes are interpreted as stem-polypterids by Giles et al. (2017).
- A study aiming to establish whether body size was linked to extinction or survival of non-teleostean actinopterygians during the Permian–Triassic extinction event is published by Puttick et al. (2017).
- Description of fish fossils from the Cretaceous (Santonian) Iharkút vertebrate site (Bakony Mountains, Hungary) is published by Szabó & Ősi (2017).
- A redescription of Kyphosichthys grandei and a study on the phylogenetic relationships of the species is published by Sun & Ni (2017), who name the new family Kyphosichthyidae.
- A study on the phylogenetic relationships of the Late Cretaceous species Sorbinicharax verraesi is published by Mayrinck et al. (2017).
- Taverne & Liston (2017) transfer the species Neopachycormus birmanicus from the Cretaceous of Myanmar, originally thought to be a member of the family Pachycormidae, to the family Plethodidae and to the genus Dixonanogmius.
- A study on the osteology and phylogenetic relationships of Signeuxella preumonti from the Middle Jurassic Stanleyville Formation (Democratic Republic of the Congo) is published by Taverne (2017).
- The leptolepid fauna from the Early Jurassic Lagerstätten of Grimmen and Dobbertin (Mecklenburg-Vorpommern, Germany) is described by Konwert & Stumpf (2017).
- A redescription of the Early Cretaceous ellimmichthyiform Scutatuspinosus itapagipensis and a study on the phylogenetic relationships of the species is published by de Figueiredo & Ribeiro (2017).
- Redescription and a study on the phylogenetic relationships of the clupeomorph species Gasteroclupea branisai from the Late Cretaceous-Paleocene of El Molino Formation (Bolivia) is published by Marramà & Carnevale (2017).
- A redescription of "Chanos" leopoldi from the Cretaceous (Albian) Limestones of Pietraroja (Italy) and a study on the phylogenetic relationships of the species is published by Taverne & Capasso (2017), who reinstate the distinct genus Caeus for this species.
- A study on the phylogenetic relationships of living and fossil members of the family Ictaluridae, and on time of origin of the clade, is published by Arce-H., Lundberg & O'Leary (2017), who present the first combined data analysis of morphological and genetic data for Ictaluridae that also includes fossil species.
- Cyprinid fossils are described from the Miocene (Serravallian) Shang Youshashan Formation (Qaidam Basin, China) by Song et al. (2017).
- A redescription of the Eocene barracudina Holosteus esocinus and a study on the phylogenetic relationships of the species is published by Marramà & Carnevale (2017).
- A redescription of the holotype specimen of Bajaichthys elegans and a study on the phylogenetic relationships of the species is published by Davesne, Carnevale & Friedman (2017).
- A study on the phylogenetic relationships of the fossil fundulid species Fundulus detillae, Fundulus lariversi and Fundulus nevadensis is published by Ghedotti & Davis (2017).
- A study on the phylogeny and evolutionary history of the Tetraodontiformes is published by Arcila & Tyler (2017), who detect a major extinction of members of the group during the Paleocene–Eocene Thermal Maximum.
- A study on the morphological changes that occurred during ontogeny of the fossil weever species Trachinus minutus is published by Přikryl (2017).
- Cichlid fossils are described from the Miocene and Pleistocene of Costa Rica by Lucas et al. (2017), representing the first known fossil record of cichlids in Central America.
- Redescription of the Eocene priacanthid species Pristigenys substriata is published by Carnevale et al. (2017).
- Isolated barracuda teeth are described from the Miocene of Madagascar by Gottfried et al. (2017).
- A study on the structure and homology of the lung plates of extant and fossil coelacanths is published by Cupello et al. (2017).
- The first direct evidence for feeding on conodonts by Late Devonian coelacanths (a single conodont element from the gut content of a possible specimen of Diplocercides, as well as several conodont elements detected within a coprolite) is reported from the Famennian deposits in Świętokrzyskie Mountains (Poland) by Zatoń et al. (2017).
- A study on the phylogenetic relationships, rates of origination and extinction, and trends in body size changes of the post-Devonian fossil lungfish is published by Kemp, Cavin & Guinot (2017).
- A study on the phylogenetic relationships of the Early Cretaceous lungfish known from the tooth plates recovered from the Ain el Guettar Formation (Tunisia) is published by Cau (2017).
- A redescription of the Devonian lungfish Pentlandia macroptera is published by Challands and den Blaauwen (2017).
- A study on the evolution of eye size in early tetrapods and in fish belonging to the lineage that gave rise to tetrapods, as well as on the impact of the eye size on the eye performance while viewing objects through water and through air is published by MacIver et al. (2017).
- A study on the evolution of forelimb musculature from the lobe-finned fish to early tetrapods is published online by Molnar et al. (2017).
- A history of the first articulated fossil fishes discovered in the United States (Early Jurassic, Newark Supergroup) is published by Brignon (2017).

== New taxa ==
=== Jawless vertebrates ===
Name	Novelty	Status	Authors	Age	Unit	Location	Notes	Images
Psammosteus ramosus	Sp. nov	Valid	Glinskiy in Glinskiy & Nilov	Devonian (Frasnian)	Andoma Formation	Latvia; Russia (Leningrad Oblast; Vologda Oblast)	A member of Psammosteida.	

=== Placoderms ===
Name	Novelty	Status	Authors	Age	Unit	Location	Notes	Images
Africanaspis edmountaini	Sp. nov	Valid	Gess & Trinajstic	Devonian (late Famennian)	Witpoort Formation	South Africa	A member of Arthrodira belonging to the family Groenlandaspididae.	
Herasmius dayi	Sp. nov	Valid	Schultze & Cumbaa	Devonian (Emsian)	Bear Rock Formation	Canada (Northwest Territories)	A member of Arthrodira belonging to the family Heterosteidae.	
Houershanaspis	Gen. et sp. nov	Valid	Lu, Tan & Wang	Early Devonian	Danlin Formation	China	Possibly a relative of Bothriolepis. The type species is H. zhangi.	
Sudaspis	Gen. et sp. nov	Valid	Vaškaninová & Ahlberg	Devonian (Lochkovian)	Lochkov Formation	Czech Republic	A member of Acanthothoraci belonging to the family Palaeacanthaspidae. The type species is S. chlupaci.	
Tlamaspis	Gen. et sp. nov	Valid	Vaškaninová & Ahlberg	Devonian (Lochkovian)	Lochkov Formation	Czech Republic	A member of Acanthothoraci belonging to the family Palaeacanthaspidae. The type species is T. inopinatus.	

=== Cartilaginous fishes ===
Name	Novelty	Status	Authors	Age	Unit	Location	Notes	Images
Abdounia mesetae	Sp. nov	Valid	Engelbrecht et al.	Eocene (Ypresian)	La Meseta Formation	Antarctica (Seymour Island)	A requiem shark.	
Abdounia richteri	Sp. nov	Valid	Engelbrecht et al.	Eocene (Ypresian)	La Meseta Formation	Antarctica (Seymour Island)	A requiem shark.	
Artiodus	Gen. et sp. nov	Valid	Ivanov & Duffin in Ivanov, Duffin & Naugolnykh	Permian (Artinskian)	Divya Formation	Russia (Sverdlovsk Oblast)	A member of Euselachii of uncertain phylogenetic placement. The type species is A. prominens.	
Asteracanthus udulfensis	Sp. nov	Valid	Leuzinger et al.	Late Jurassic (Kimmeridgian)	Reuchenette Formation	Switzerland	A member of the family Hybodontidae.	
Bythiacanthus lopesi	Sp. nov	Valid	Figueroa & Gallo	Permian (Cisuralian)	Pedra de Fogo Formation	Brazil		
Cypripediodens	Gen. et sp. nov	Valid	Duffin & Ward	Carboniferous (Brigantian)	Carboniferous Limestone Supergroup (Eyam Limestone Formation)	United Kingdom	A janassid petalodont. Genus includes new species C. cristatus.	
Echinorhinus maremagnum	Sp. nov	Valid	Bogan et al.	Late Cretaceous	Calafate Formation	Argentina	A species of Echinorhinus. Originally also reported from Chile, but the fossil material from this country was subsequently referred to the separate species Echinorhinus taverai.	
Edaphodon renardi	Sp. nov	Valid	Canevet in Canevet & Lebrun	Miocene		France		
Eodalatias	Gen. et sp. nov	Valid	Engelbrecht et al.	Eocene	La Meseta Formation	Antarctica (Seymour Island)	A member of the family Dalatiidae. Genus includes new species E. austrinalis.	
Kallodentis	Gen. et sp. nov	Valid	Engelbrecht et al.	Eocene (Ypresian and Lutetian)	La Meseta Formation	Antarctica (Seymour Island)	A houndshark. The type species is K. rhytistemma.	
Kungurodus	Gen. et comb. nov	Valid	Ivanov	Early Permian		Kazakhstan; Russia	A member of Symmoriiformes of uncertain phylogenetic placement; a new genus for "Cobelodus" obliquus Ivanov (2005).	
Meridiogaleus	Gen. et sp. nov	Valid	Engelbrecht et al.	Eocene (Ypresian and Lutetian)	La Meseta Formation	Antarctica (Seymour Island)	A houndshark. The type species is M. cristatus.	
Oblidens	Gen. et sp. nov	Valid	Duffin & Milàn	Early Jurassic (Pliensbachian)	Hasle Formation	Denmark	A chimaera belonging to the group Myriacanthoidei and the family Myriacanthidae. The type species is O. bornholmensis.	
Potamotrygon canaanorum	Sp. nov	Valid	Chabain et al.	Late Oligocene-late Miocene	Pebas Formation	Peru	A species of Potamotrygon.	
Potamotrygon contamanensis	Sp. nov	Valid	Chabain et al.	Late Oligocene-late Miocene	Pebas Formation	Peru	A species of Potamotrygon.	
Potamotrygon rajachloeae	Sp. nov	Valid	Chabain et al.	Late Oligocene-late Miocene	Pebas Formation	Peru	A species of Potamotrygon.	
Pseudoapristurus	Gen. et sp. nov	Valid	Pollerspöck & Straube	Miocene (Burdigalian)	Neuhofener Beds	Germany	A catshark. The type species is P. nonstriatus.	
Ptychotrygon clementsi	Sp. nov	Valid	Case et al.	Late Cretaceous (late Maastrichtian)	Peedee Formation	United States (North Carolina)		
Rubencanthus	Gen. et sp. nov	Valid	Figueroa & Gallo	Permian (Cisuralian)	Pedra de Fogo Formation	Brazil	A member of Euselachii, possibly a member of the family Sphenacanthidae. Genus includes new species R. diplotuberculatus.	
Sphenacanthus ignis	Sp. nov	Valid	Figueroa & Gallo	Permian (Cisuralian)	Pedra de Fogo Formation	Brazil		
Sulcidens	Gen. et comb. nov	Valid	Underwood, Kolmann & Ward	Paleocene to early Eocene		Angola; Morocco	A member of Myliobatiformes of uncertain phylogenetic placement; a new genus for "Myliobatis" sulcidens Darteville & Casier (1943).	
Titanonarke megapterygia	Sp. nov	Valid	Marramà et al.	Eocene (Ypresian)	Monte Bolca	Italy	A numbfish.	
Triodus richterae	Sp. nov	Valid	Pauliv et al.	Permian (probably Capitanian)	Rio do Rasto Formation	Brazil		

=== Bony fishes ===
Name	Novelty	Status	Authors	Age	Unit	Location	Notes	Images
Aotearichthys	Gen. et sp. nov	Valid	Schwarzhans, Lee & Gard	Late Oligocene	Chatton Formation	New Zealand	A relative of the extant viviparous brotula genus Dinematichthys. The type species is A. vestalis.	
Aphia macrophthalma	Sp. nov	Valid	Schwarzhans, Ahnelt, Carnevale & Japundžić in Schwarzhans et al.	Miocene		Serbia	A goby related to the transparent goby.	
Aulopus costeiensis	Sp. nov	Valid	Schwarzhans	Miocene		Romania	A species of Aulopus.	
Avitoplectus	Gen. et sp. nov	Valid	Bemis et al.	Early Eocene	Cambay Shale Formation	India	A member of Tetraodontiformes of uncertain phylogenetic placement. Genus includes new species A. molaris.	
Babelichthys	Gen. et sp. nov	Valid	Davesne	Middle to late Eocene	Pabdeh Formation	Iran	A crestfish. The type species is B. olneyi.	
Bathypterois solidus	Sp. nov	Valid	Schwarzhans	Miocene		Romania	A species of Bathypterois.	
Benthophilus? ovisulcus	Sp. nov	Valid	Schwarzhans, Bradić & Bratishko in Schwarzhans et al.	Miocene		Romania	A goby, possibly a tadpole goby.	
Benthophilus styriacus	Sp. nov	Valid	Schwarzhans, Bradić & Bratishko in Schwarzhans et al.	Miocene		Austria; Romania	A tadpole goby.	
Birgeria americana	Sp. nov	Valid	Romano et al.	Early Triassic	Thaynes Group	United States (Nevada)		
Calaichthys	Gen. et sp. nov	Valid	Gouiric-Cavalli et al.	Middle Triassic (Anisian)	Cerro de Las Cabras Formation	Argentina	A ray-finned fish belonging to the group Redfieldiiformes. The type species is C. tehul.	
Callanthias transylvanicus	Sp. nov	Valid	Schwarzhans	Miocene		Romania	A species of Callanthias.	
Candelarhynchus	Gen. et sp. nov	Valid	Vernygora et al.	Late Cretaceous (Turonian)		Colombia	A relative of Dercetis. Genus includes new species C. padillai.	
Centroberyx worthyi	Sp. nov	Valid	Schwarzhans, Lee & Gard	Late Oligocene	Chatton Formation; Waihoaka Formation	New Zealand	A species of Centroberyx.	
Ceratodus kempae	Sp. nov	Valid	Frederickson & Cifelli	Early Cretaceous (Valanginian)	Cedar Mountain Formation	United States (Utah)	A lungfish.	
Ceratodus kirklandi	Sp. nov	Valid	Frederickson & Cifelli	Early Cretaceous (Valanginian)	Cedar Mountain Formation	United States (Utah)	A lungfish.	
Ceratodus molossus	Sp. nov	Valid	Frederickson & Cifelli	Late Cretaceous (Cenomanian)	Cedar Mountain Formation; Naturita Formation	United States (Utah)	A lungfish.	
Ceratodus nirumbee	Sp. nov	Valid	Frederickson & Cifelli	Early Cretaceous (Albian)	Cloverly Formation	United States (Montana)	A lungfish.	
Chilomycterus exspectatus	Sp. nov		Aguilera, Carrillo-Briceño & Rodriguez in Aguilera et al.	Late Miocene	Gatun Formation	Panama	A species of Chilomycterus.	
Chilomycterus tyleri	Sp. nov		Aguilera, Carrillo-Briceño & Rodriguez in Aguilera et al.	Late Miocene	Gatun Formation	Panama	A species of Chilomycterus.	
Cornusolea	Gen. et sp. nov	Valid	Schwarzhans, Ohe & Ando	Early Oligocene	Kishima Formation	Japan	A member of Soleidae. The type species is C. fudoujii.	
Coryphaenoides biobtusus	Sp. nov	Valid	Lin et al.	Miocene (Tortonian)		Italy	A species of Coryphaenoides.	
Ctenosciaena angusticaudata	Sp. nov	Valid	Núñez-Flores et al.	Miocene (Burdigalian)	Castillo Formation	Venezuela	A member of Sciaenidae.	
Cyclothone gaudanti	Sp. nov	Valid	Přikryl & Carnevale	Miocene (late Tortonian)	Makrilia Formation	Greece	A bristlemouth, a species of Cyclothone.	
Cynoclupea	Gen. et sp. nov	Valid	Malabarba & Di Dario	Early Cretaceous (Barremian-Aptian)	Morro do Chaves Formation	Brazil	A member of Clupeiformes related to wolf herrings and anchovies. Genus includes new species C. nelsoni.	
Damergouia	Gen. et sp. nov	Valid	Vullo et al.	Late Cretaceous (Turonian)		Niger	A member of Pycnodontiformes related to Polygyrodus. The type species is D. lamberti.	
Diodon serratus	Sp. nov		Aguilera, Carrillo-Briceño & Rodriguez in Aguilera et al.	Middle Miocene	Socorro Formation	Venezuela	A species of Diodon.	
Economidichthys altidorsalis	Sp. nov	Valid	Schwarzhans, Bradić & Bratishko in Schwarzhans et al.	Miocene		Austria; Romania	A goby, a species of Economidichthys.	
Enchodus tineidae	Sp. nov	Valid	Holloway et al.	Late Cretaceous (late Campanian)	Duwi Formation	Egypt		
Enophrys hoplites	Sp. nov	Valid	Nazarkin	Miocene (Serravallian‒Tortonian)	Agnevo Formation	Russia (Sakhalin Oblast)	A species of Enophrys.	
Eoanabas	Sp. nov		Wu et al.	Oligocene (Chattian)	Dingqing Formation	China	A climbing gourami. The type species is E. thibetana.	
Eoserrasalmimus	Gen. et sp. nov	Valid	Vullo et al.	Late Cretaceous (late Maastrichtian)	Eastern Ouled Abdoun Basin	Morocco	A member of Pycnodontiformes related to Polygyrodus. The type species is E. cattoi.	
Esox nogaicus	Sp. nov	Valid	Kovalchuk, Wilson & Grande	Early Pleistocene		Ukraine	A species of Esox.	
Eurypleuron debilis	Sp. nov	Valid	Schwarzhans, Lee & Gard	Late Oligocene	Chatton Formation	New Zealand	A species of Eurypleuron.	
Foreyia	Gen. et sp. nov		Cavin et al.	Middle Triassic (Ladinian)	Prosanto Formation	Switzerland	A coelacanth belonging to the family Latimeriidae. The type species is F. maxkuhni.	
Gobius jarosi	Sp. nov	Valid	Přikryl & Reichenbacher in Reichenbacher et al.	Miocene (Burdigalian)		Czech Republic; Poland	A goby, a species of Gobius.	
Gonostoma dracula	Sp. nov	Valid	Grădianu et al.	Oligocene		Romania	A species of Gonostoma.	
Grimmenodon	Gen. et sp. nov	Valid	Stumpf et al.	Early Jurassic (Toarcian)		Germany	A member of Pycnodontiformes. The type species is G. aureum.	
Gymnogobius oligocenicus	Sp. nov	Valid	Schwarzhans, Ohe & Ando	Early Oligocene	Kishima Formation	Japan	A species of Gymnogobius.	
Hesperichthys	Gen. et sp. et comb. nov	Valid	Schwarzhans, Ahnelt, Carnevale & Japundžić in Schwarzhans et al.	Miocene		Austria; Bulgaria; Croatia; Serbia; Slovakia	A goby. The type species is H. reductus; genus also includes "Hyrcanogobius" hesperis Schwarzhans, Bradić & Rundić (2015).	
Heteroconger? mataura	Sp. nov	Valid	Schwarzhans, Lee & Gard	Late Oligocene	Chatton Formation	New Zealand	Possibly a species of Heteroconger.	
Hippohaliichthys	Gen. et sp. nov	Valid	Žalohar & Hitij	Middle Miocene		Slovenia	A member of the family Syngnathidae related to Haliichthys taeniophorus. The type species is H. edis.	
Hispanamia	Gen. et sp. nov	Valid	Martín-Abad & Poyato-Ariza	Early Cretaceous		Spain	A member of Amiiformes. Genus includes new species H. newbreyi.	
Hongyu	Gen. et sp. nov	Valid	Zhu et al.	Devonian	Zhongning Formation	China	A member of Tetrapodomorpha of uncertain phylogenetic placement. The type species is H. chowi.	
Isadia opokiensis	Sp. nov	Valid	Minikh & Andrushkevich	Late Permian	Poldarsa/Poldarskaya Formation	Russia (Orenburg Oblast; Vologda Oblast)	A ray-finned fish belonging to the group Eurynotoidiformes. Originally described as a species of Isadia, but subsequently made the type species of the separate genus Vologdinia.	
Italophiopsis	Gen. et sp. nov	Valid	Taverne & Capasso	Early Cretaceous (Albian)	Limestones of Pietraroja	Italy	A member of Halecomorphi belonging to the group Ionoscopiformes. The type species is I. derasmoi.	
Karaganops	Gen. et comb. nov	Valid	Baykina & Schwarzhans	Miocene		Bulgaria; Russia (Krasnodar Krai; Tambov Oblast)	A member of Clupeidae. The type species is "Sardinella" perrata Daniltshenko (1970); genus also includes Karaganops komochtitziensis (Strashimirov, 1985).	
Kelemejtubus	Gen. et sp. nov	Valid	Cantalice & Alvarado-Ortega	Paleocene (Danian)		Mexico	A member of Percomorpha of uncertain phylogenetic placement. Genus includes new species K. castroi.	
Knipowitschia bulgarica	Sp. nov	Valid	Schwarzhans, Bradić & Bratishko in Schwarzhans et al.	Miocene		Bulgaria	A goby, a species of Knipowitschia.	
Krebsiella chattonensis	Sp. nov	Valid	Schwarzhans, Lee & Gard	Late Oligocene	Chatton Formation	New Zealand	A member of the family Percophidae.	
Lambeia	Gen. et sp. nov	Valid	Mickle	Carboniferous (Tournaisian)	Albert Formation	Canada (New Brunswick)	An early member of Actinopterygii. The type species is L. pectinatus.	
Leptolepis toyei	Sp. nov	Valid	Flannery Sutherland et al.	Early Cretaceous (Hauterivian)	Lower Weald Clay Formation	United Kingdom		
Leptolepis wealdensis	Sp. nov	Valid	Flannery Sutherland et al.	Early Cretaceous (Hauterivian)	Lower Weald Clay Formation	United Kingdom		
Lesueurigobius magniiugis	Sp. nov	Valid	Schwarzhans	Miocene		Romania	A species of Lesueurigobius.	
Lesueurigobius stironensis	Sp. nov	Valid	Lin et al.	Miocene (Tortonian)		Italy	A species of Lesueurigobius.	
Lesueurina transoceana	Sp. nov	Valid	Schwarzhans, Lee & Gard	Late Oligocene	Chatton Formation	New Zealand	A relative of the flathead pygmy-stargazer.	
Liza brevirostris	Sp. nov	Valid	Schwarzhans, Ohe & Ando	Early Oligocene	Kishima Formation	Japan	A species of Liza.	
Lombardichthys	Gen. et comb. nov	Valid	Arratia	Late Triassic (Norian)		Italy	A new genus for "Pholidophorus" gervasuttii Zambelli (1980).	
Lotella latidorsalis	Sp. nov	Valid	Schwarzhans, Lee & Gard	Late Oligocene	Chatton Formation	New Zealand	A species of Lotella.	
Louckaichthys	Gen. et sp. nov	Valid	Přikryl & Carnevale	Oligocene (Rupelian)	Menilitic Formation	Czech Republic	A member of the family Batrachoididae. The type species is L. novosadi.	
Luxembourgichthys	Gen. et comb. nov	Valid	Taverne & Steurbaut	Early Jurassic (Toarcian)	Grandcourt Formation	Belgium; Luxembourg	A new genus for "Pholidophorus" friedeni Delsate (1999).	
"Merluccius" rattazzii	Sp. nov	Valid	Lin et al.	Miocene (Tortonian)		Italy	A member of the family Merlucciidae.	
Microdesmus paratethycus	Sp. nov	Valid	Schwarzhans	Miocene		Bulgaria	A species of Microdesmus.	
Micropercops pomahaka	Sp. nov	Valid	Schwarzhans, Lee & Gard	Late Oligocene	Pomahaka Formation	New Zealand	A species of Micropercops.	
Moldavichthys	Gen. et sp. nov	Valid	Baykina & Schwarzhans	Miocene		Moldova	A member of Alosinae. Genus includes new species M. switshenskae. Baykina & Schwarzhans (2017) also listed "Clupea" gomotartziensis Strashimirov (1985) as a possible species belonging to this genus, but subsequently this species was moved to the genus Maeotichthys.	
Moringua waimumuensis	Sp. nov	Valid	Schwarzhans, Lee & Gard	Late Oligocene	Chatton Formation	New Zealand	A species of Moringua.	
Myripristis lobata	Sp. nov	Valid	Schwarzhans	Miocene		Romania	A species of Myripristis.	
Namicauda	Gen. et sp. nov	Valid	Schwarzhans, Ohe & Ando	Early Oligocene	Kishima Formation	Japan	A member of the family Polymixiidae. The type species is N. pulvinata.	
Nanningocyprinus	Gen. et sp. nov	Valid	Chen, Cen & Liu	Oligocene	Yongning Formation	China	A member of Cyprinidae. The type species is N. wui.	
Neobythites auriculatus	Sp. nov	Valid	Lin et al.	Miocene (Tortonian)		Italy	A species of Neobythites.	
Neobythites lindqvisti	Sp. nov	Valid	Schwarzhans, Lee & Gard	Late Oligocene	Waihoaka Formation	New Zealand	A species of Neobythites.	
Neogobius bettinae	Sp. nov	Valid	Bratishko, Kovalchuk & Schwarzhans	Miocene (Tortonian)		Ukraine	A goby, a species of Neogobius.	
Nhanulepisosteus	Gen. et sp. nov	Valid	Brito, Alvarado-Ortega & Meunier	Late Jurassic (Kimmeridgian)	Sabinal Formation	Mexico	A gar. The type species is N. mexicanus.	
Nishiberyx	Gen. et sp. nov	Valid	Schwarzhans, Ohe & Ando	Early Oligocene	Kishima Formation	Japan	A member of Berycidae. The type species is N. nishimotoi.	
Onychodus eriensis	Sp. nov	Valid	Mann et al.	Devonian (Eifelian–Givetian boundary)	Dundee Formation	Canada (Ontario)		
Optivus moko	Sp. nov	Valid	Schwarzhans, Lee & Gard	Late Oligocene	Chatton Formation	New Zealand	A species of Optivus.	
Ortugobius	Gen. etp. nov	Valid	Schwarzhans, Ohe & Ando	Early Oligocene	Kishima Formation	Japan	A member of Gobioidei, possibly a goby. The type species is O. cascus.	
Pagellus schuberti	Sp. nov	Valid	Schwarzhans	Miocene		Romania	A species of Pagellus.	
Paraclupea seilacheri	Sp. nov.	Valid	Alvarado-Ortega & Melgarejo-Damián	Early Cretaceous (Albian)	Tlayúa Formation	Mexico	A member of Clupeomorpha belonging to the group Ellimmichthyiformes and the family Paraclupeidae.	
Paralates chapelcornerensis	Sp. nov	Valid	Gierl & Reichenbacher	Eocene (Priabonian)	Chapelcorner Fish Bed	United Kingdom	A stem-freshwater sleeper. The original spelling of the species name, Paralates chapelcorneri, was subsequently corrected to P. chapelcornerensis.	
Parasolea	Gen. et comb. nov	Valid	Schwarzhans et al.	Miocene		Serbia	A member of the family Soleidae; a new genus for "Rhombus" serbicus Anđelković (1966).	
Pareques laraensis	Sp. nov	Valid	Núñez-Flores et al.	Miocene (Burdigalian)	Castillo Formation	Venezuela	A member of Sciaenidae.	
Pholidoctenus sanpellegrinensis	Sp. nov	Valid	Arratia	Triassic		Italy		
Pontinus? karasawai	Sp. nov	Valid	Schwarzhans, Ohe & Ando	Early Oligocene	Kishima Formation	Japan	A scorpionfish, possibly a species of Pontinus.	
Proneogobius	Gen. et comb. nov	Valid	Schwarzhans, Ahnelt, Carnevale & Japundžić in Schwarzhans et al.	Miocene		Croatia	A goby; a new genus for "Gobius" pullus Kramberger (1882).	
Protobenthophilus	Gen. et 2 sp. nov	Valid	Schwarzhans, Ahnelt, Carnevale & Japundžić in Schwarzhans et al.	Miocene		Austria; Bulgaria; Croatia; Romania	A goby. The type species is P. squamatus; genus also includes P. strashimirovi.	
Pshekhagnathus	Gen. et sp. nov	Valid	Bannikov, Carnevale & Popov	Oligocene (Rupelian)		Russia (Krasnodar Krai)	A member of the family Syngnathidae. The type species is P. polypterus.	
Ptyctolepis	Gen. et sp. nov	Valid	Lu et al.	Devonian (Pragian)	Posongchong Formation	China	A stem-sarcopterygian. The type species is P. brachynotus.	
Qarmoutus	Gen. et sp. nov	Valid	El-Sayed et al.	Eocene (Priabonian)	Birket Qarun Formation	Egypt	A member of Ariidae. The type species is Q. hitanensis.	
Rhynchoconger placidus	Sp. nov	Valid	Schwarzhans, Ohe & Ando	Early Oligocene	Kishima Formation	Japan	A species of Rhynchoconger.	
Rhynchoconger subtilis	Sp. nov	Valid	Schwarzhans, Ohe & Ando	Early Oligocene	Kishima Formation	Japan	A species of Rhynchoconger.	
Sachajenynsia	Gen. et sp. nov	Valid	Sferco et al.	Miocene		Argentina	A member of Anablepidae. Genus includes new species S. pacha.	
Sagaberyx	Gen. et sp. nov	Valid	Schwarzhans, Ohe & Ando	Early Oligocene	Kishima Formation	Japan	A member of Beryciformes belonging to the suborder Berycoidei. The type species is S. kishimaensis.	
Sardinops robinsoni	Sp. nov	Valid	Schwarzhans, Lee & Gard	Late Oligocene	Chatton Formation	New Zealand	A relative of the South American pilchard.	
Saurida macilenta	Sp. nov	Valid	Schwarzhans, Ohe & Ando	Early Oligocene	Kishima Formation	Japan	A species of Saurida.	
Saurorhynchus anningae	Sp. nov	Valid	Maxwell & Stumpf	Early Jurassic	Charmouth Mudstone	United Kingdom		
Saurorhynchus hauffi	Sp. nov	Valid	Maxwell & Stumpf	Early Jurassic	Posidonia Shale	Germany; United Kingdom		
Scalacurvichthys	Gen. et sp. nov	Valid	Cawley & Kriwet	Late Cretaceous (Cenomanian)	Amminadav Formation or Bet-Meir Formation	West Bank, Palestine de jure, Israel de facto	A member of Pycnodontidae. The type species is S. naishi.	
Scleropages sinensis	Sp. nov	Valid	Zhang & Wilson	Early Eocene	Yangxi Formation	China	A species of Scleropages.	
Serrasalmimus	Gen. et sp. nov	Valid	Vullo et al.	Paleocene (early Thanetian)	Eastern Ouled Abdoun Basin	Morocco	A member of Pycnodontiformes related to Polygyrodus. The type species is S. secans.	
Sparalepis	Gen. et sp. nov	Valid	Choo et al.	Silurian (late Ludlow)	Kuanti Formation	China	An early bony fish, probably a stem-sarcopterygian. The type species is S. tingi.	
Subortichthys	Gen. et sp. nov	Valid	Ma & Xu	Middle Triassic (Anisian)	Guanling Formation	China	A member of Halecomorphi belonging to the group Ionoscopiformes. The type species is S. triassicus.	
Teffichthys	Gen. et comb. nov	Valid	Marramà et al.	Early Triassic	Ankitokazo Basin	Angola; Greenland; Madagascar; Norway	A non-perleidiform member of Actinopterygii. A new genus for "Perleidus" madagascariensis Piveteau (1934); genus also includes "Perleidus" woodwardi, "Perleidus" stoschiensis, "Perleidus" lutoensis and "Perleidus" lehmani.	
Tonganago	Gen. et et comb. sp. nov	Valid	Schwarzhans, Lee & Gard	Eocene to Miocene	Chatton Formation	New Zealand	A member of the family Congridae. The type species is "Scalanago" fastigatus Schwarzhans (1980); genus also includes "Mystriophis" obliquum Stinton (1957), Tonganago sagittisulcatus (Schwarzhans, 1980) and a new species T. coplandi.	
Trachyrincus tewaewae	Sp. nov	Valid	Schwarzhans, Lee & Gard	Late Oligocene	Waihoaka Formation	New Zealand	A species of Trachyrincus.	
Tucmanableps	Gen. et sp. nov	Valid	Sferco et al.	Miocene		Argentina	A member of Anablepidae. Genus includes new species T. cionei.	
Tugenchromis	Gen. et sp. nov	Valid	Altner et al.	Late Miocene	Ngorora Formation	Kenya	A cichlid belonging to the subfamily Pseudocrenilabrinae. Genus includes new species T. pickfordi.	
Weilerigobius	Gen. et sp. nov	Valid	Schwarzhans	Miocene		Romania	Genus includes new species W. lapugiensis.	
Xenoceratodus	Gen. et sp. nov	Valid	Longrich	Late Eocene		Libya	A stem-lepidosireniform lungfish. The type species is X. labyrinthus.	
Zhongweilepis	Gen. et sp. nov	Valid	Tan	Carboniferous (late Namurian)	Tupo Formation	China	A member of Palaeonisciformes of uncertain phylogenetic placement. The type species is Z. macilentus.	
Zorzinilabrus	Gen. et sp. nov.	Valid	Bannikov & Bellwood	Eocene (late Ypresian)	Monte Bolca locality	Italy	A wrasse. The type species is Z. furcatus.	
