= Australian arowana =

Australian arowana is a common name for several fishes and may refer to:

- Scleropages jardinii
- Scleropages leichardti
