= Odostomia umbilicaris =

- Drawing of a shell of Odostomia umbilicaris

Scientific classification
- Kingdom: Animalia
- Phylum: Mollusca
- Class: Gastropoda
- Family: Pyramidellidae
- Genus: Odostomia
- Species: O. umbilicaris

Binomial name
- Odostomia umbilicaris (Malm, 1863)

Synonyms
- Odostomia acuta var. umbilicaris Malm, 1863; Odostomia (Odostomia) acuta acuta umbilicaris (f) Malm, 1863

Species of sea snail

Odostomia umbilicaris is a species of sea snail, a marine gastropod mollusc in the family Pyramidellidae, the pyrams and their allies.

== Description ==
The white shell is thin, transparent, and very glossy. The length measures 2.5 millimetres (0.1 in). The five to six whorls of the teleoconch have deep sutures. The umbilicus is very distinct, but small. The columellar tooth is small, but prominent. Owing to the transparency of the whorls, the periphery of each appears like a narrow band round the top of the succeeding one.

== Distribution ==
This species occurs in the following locations:

- European waters (ERMS scope) (Scandinavia, Mediterranean Sea)
- Irish Exclusive economic Zone
