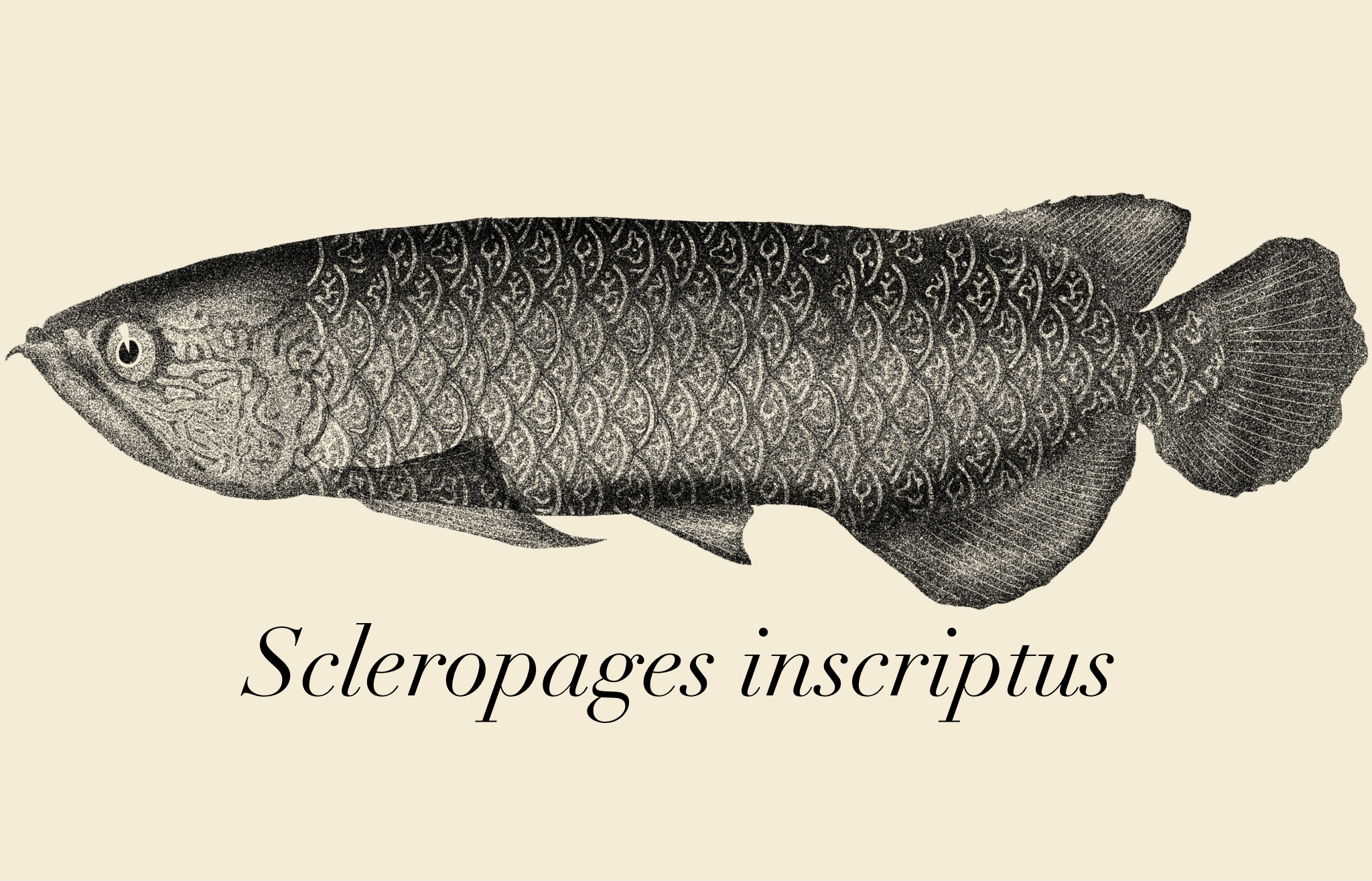

Conservation status
- Data Deficient (IUCN 3.1)
- CITES Appendix I (CITES)

Scientific classification
- Kingdom: Animalia
- Phylum: Chordata
- Class: Actinopterygii
- Order: Osteoglossiformes
- Family: Osteoglossidae
- Genus: Scleropages
- Species: S. inscriptus

Binomial name
- Scleropages inscriptus T. R. Roberts, 2012
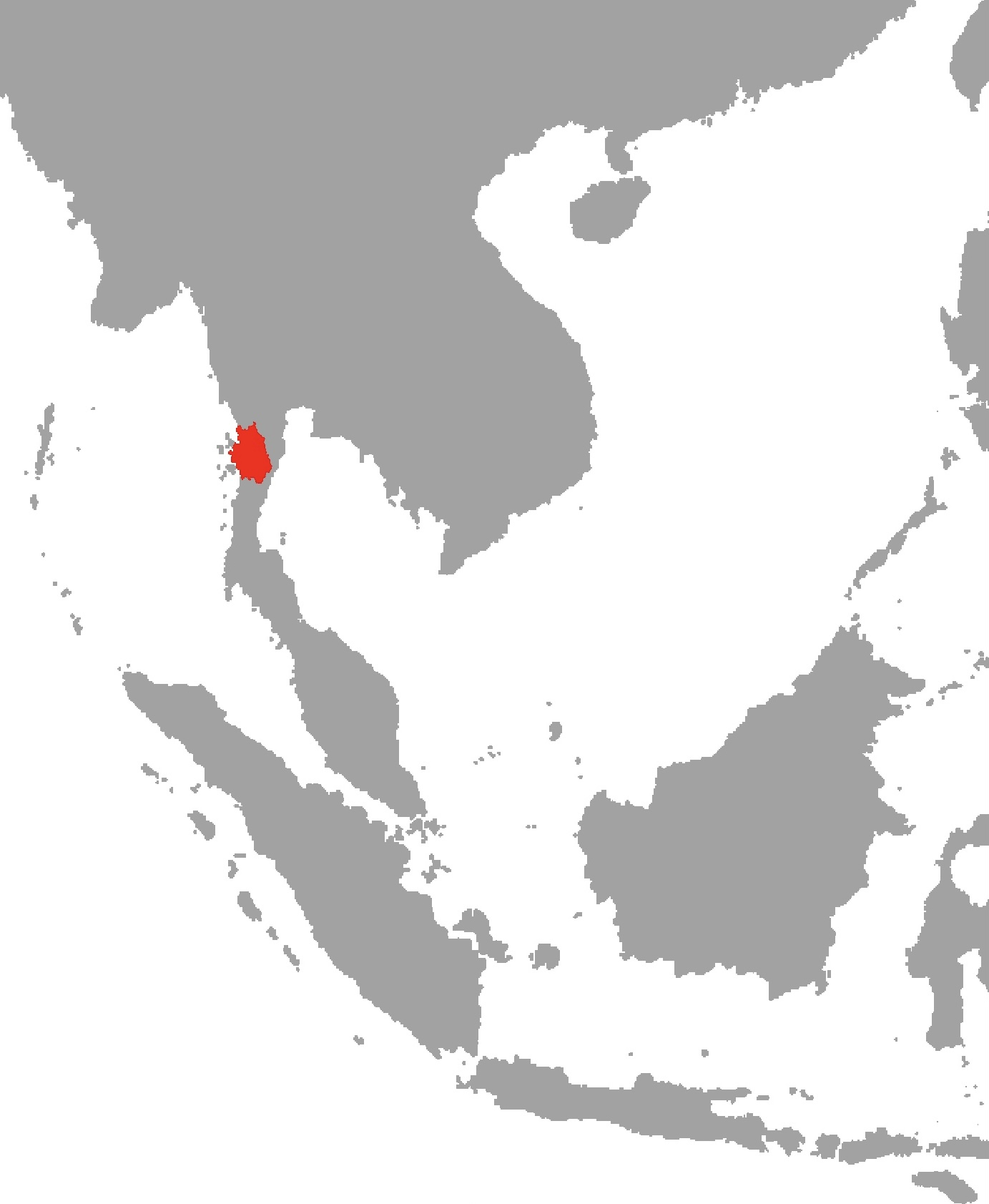

= Myanmar arowana =

Aquarium fish from Myanmar

The Batik arowana or Myanmar arowana (Scleropages inscriptus) is a large, bony-tongued fish native to Myanmar. The species is found in the Tanintharyi River basin on the Indian Ocean coast of peninsular Myanmar.

This species is differentiated from other members of Scleropages by the wavy pattern present on the scales and head of the fish similar to Batik textiles.

Past records indicate that the fish was a fairly commonly consumed fish in the region. However it is claimed to be extinct in the wild due to overharvesting for the aquarium trade.

Originally, this species was classified as the same as the Asian arowana (S. formosus), but it was first recognized in 1993 during a fish survey conducted by Thai ichthyologists in the rainforests along the border between Thailand and Myanmar, specifically near the Tanintharyi River in the Tanintharyi Region of Myanmar. In 1994, a more targeted expedition was launched to collect specimens, resulting in the capture of two fish from a mountain stream that is a tributary of the Tanintharyi River. Unfortunately, both fish died on the journey back due to the extremely rugged terrain. However, photographs of the two specimens were taken and later circulated among elite aquarists in Thailand and Japan. At that time, the Myanmar arowana became known under the nickname "Blue arowana."

It was not until 2012 that Tyson R. Roberts, formally described the species of arowana in scientific literature. He based his description on two preserved specimens obtained from aquarium trader in Myeik, which were deposited at the Natural History Museum of the National Science Museum Organization (NSM) in Thailand. The fish exhibited the unique characteristics described earlier. Native to the Tanintharyi River, the Myanmar arowana has also been found in La-ngu Canal in Satun Province, Thailand, and in certain lakes in northern Malaysia. Additionally, credible reports suggest sightings on Phuket Island as well. The specific name inscriptus derives from the Latin word "inscribere", meaning "to engrave" — a reference to the intricate markings on the fish's body.

== See also ==
- List of freshwater aquarium fish species
