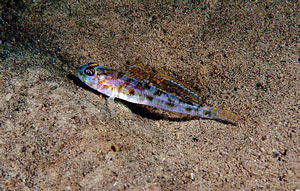
- Fries's Goby (L. friesii)

Scientific classification
- Kingdom: Animalia
- Phylum: Chordata
- Class: Actinopterygii
- Division: Teleostei
- Order: Gobiiformes
- Family: Gobiidae
- Subfamily: Gobiinae
- Genus: Lesueurigobius; Whitley, 1950

Type species
- Gobius suerii A. Risso, 1810

Synonyms
- Lesueuria Duncker, 1928 (preoccupied)

= Lesueurigobius =

Genus of fishes

Lesueurigobius is a genus of gobies native to the eastern Atlantic Ocean. The generic name honours the French naturalist Charles Alexandre Lesueur (1778-1846), for whom the type species, Lesueurigobius suerii, was named, Georg Duncker's name Lesueuria being preoccupied by a genus of comb jellies.

== Species ==
There are currently five recognized species in this genus:

- Lesueurigobius friesii (Malm, 1874) (Fries's goby)
- Lesueurigobius heterofasciatus Maul, 1971
- Lesueurigobius koumansi (Norman, 1935)
- Lesueurigobius sanzi (F. de Buen, 1918) (Sanzo's goby)
- Lesueurigobius suerii (A. Risso, 1810) (Lesueur's goby)
