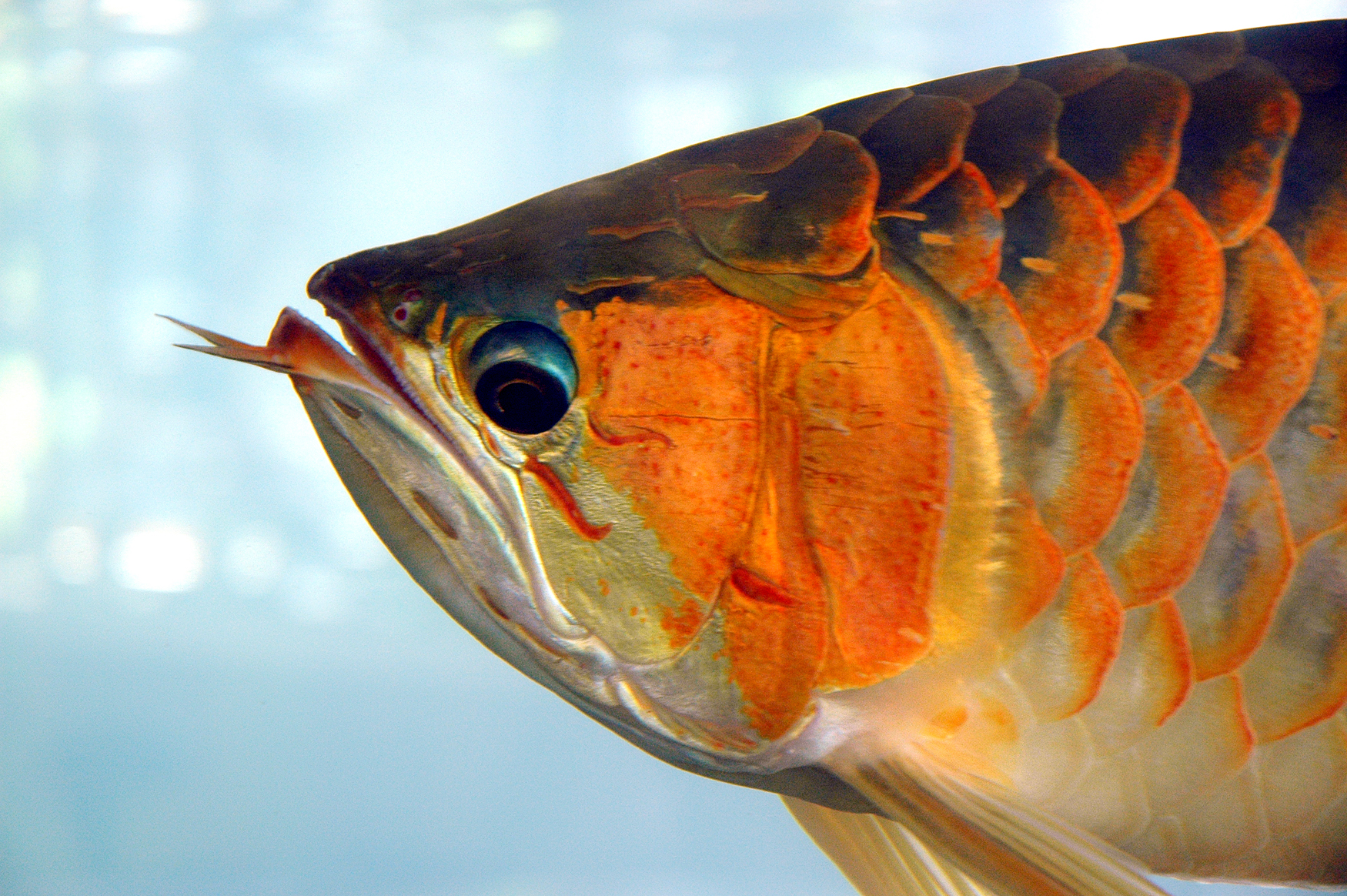
- Super red arowana

Conservation status
- Endangered (IUCN 3.1)
- CITES Appendix I

Scientific classification
- Kingdom: Animalia
- Phylum: Chordata
- Class: Actinopterygii
- Order: Osteoglossiformes
- Family: Osteoglossidae
- Genus: Scleropages
- Species: S. formosus

Binomial name
- Scleropages formosus (Sa. Müller & Schlegel, 1844)
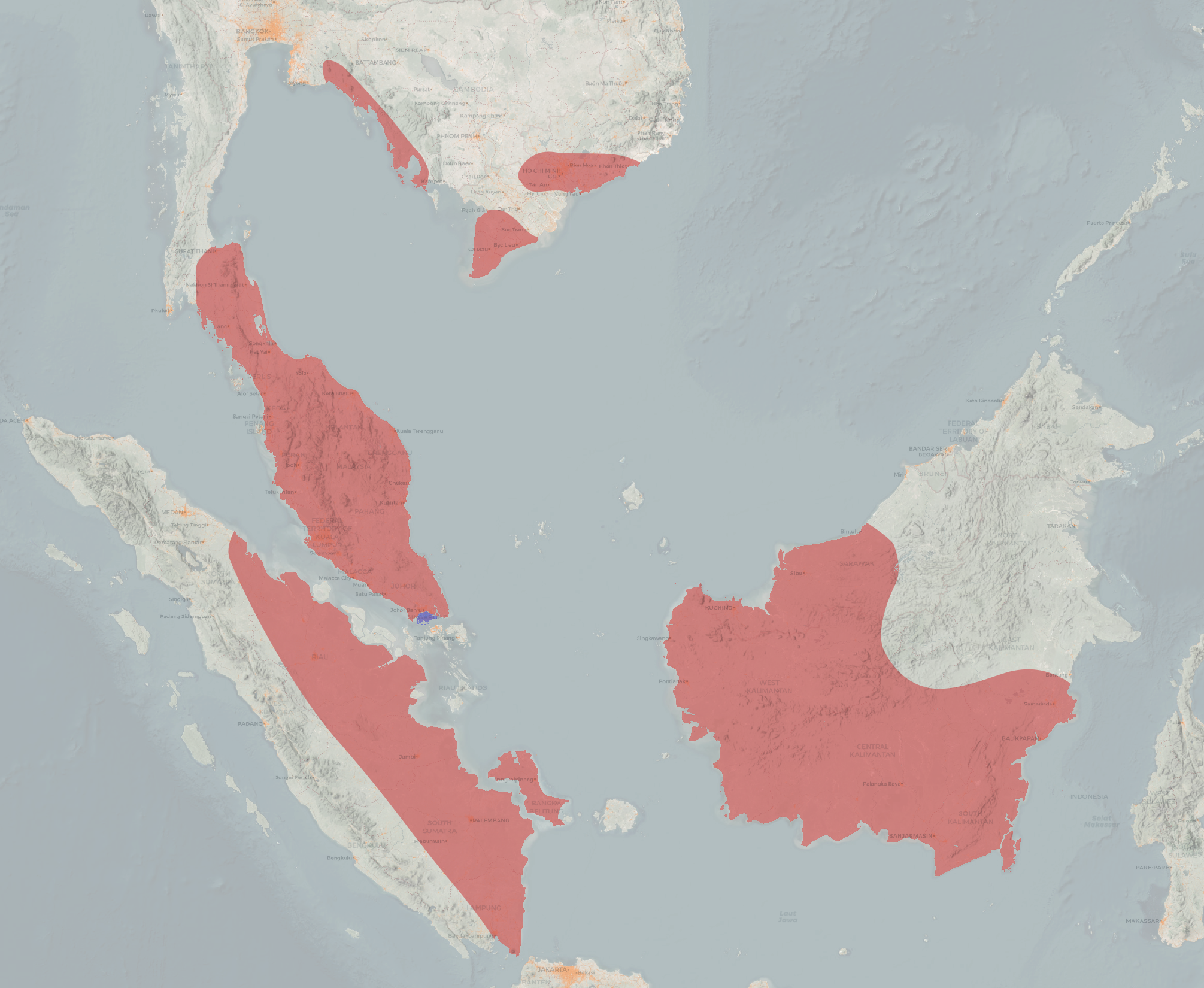
- The former primary range of the Asian arowana. The species is now extirpated from much of its former range.

Synonyms
- Scleropages macrocephalus Pouyaud et al., 2003; Scleropages aureus Pouyaud et al., 2003; Scleropages legendrei Pouyaud et al., 2003

= Asian arowana =

Species of freshwater fish

The Asian arowana (Scleropages formosus) comprises several phenotypic varieties of freshwater fish distributed geographically across Southeast Asia. While most consider the different varieties to belong to a single species, work by Pouyaud et al. (2003) differentiates these varieties into multiple species. They have several other common names, including Asian bonytongue, dragonfish, and a number of names specific to the different color varieties.

Native to Southeast Asia, Asian arowanas inhabit blackwater rivers, slow-moving waters flowing through forested swamps and wetlands. Adults feed on other fish, while juveniles feed on insects.

These popular aquarium fish have special cultural significance in areas influenced by Chinese culture. The name 'dragonfish' stems from their resemblance to the Chinese dragon. This popularity has had both positive and negative effects on their status as endangered species.

== Evolution and taxonomy ==
Like all members of the Osteoglossidae, Asian arowanas are highly adapted to fresh water and are incapable of surviving in the ocean. Therefore, their spread throughout the islands of Southeast Asia suggests they diverged from other osteoglossids before the continental breakup of Pangaea was complete. Genetic studies have confirmed this hypothesis, showing the ancestor of the Asian arowanas diverged from the ancestor of the Australian arowanas, S. jardinii and S. leichardti, about 140 million years ago, during the Early Cretaceous period. This divergence took place in the eastern margin of Gondwanaland, with the ancestors of Asian arowanas carried on the Indian subcontinent or smaller landmasses into Asia. The morphological similarity of all Scleropages species shows little evolutionary change has taken place recently for these ancient fish.

The first description of this species was published in 1840 by German naturalists Salomon Müller and Hermann Schlegel, under the name Osteoglossum formosum, although later this species was placed in Scleropages with the name S. formosus.

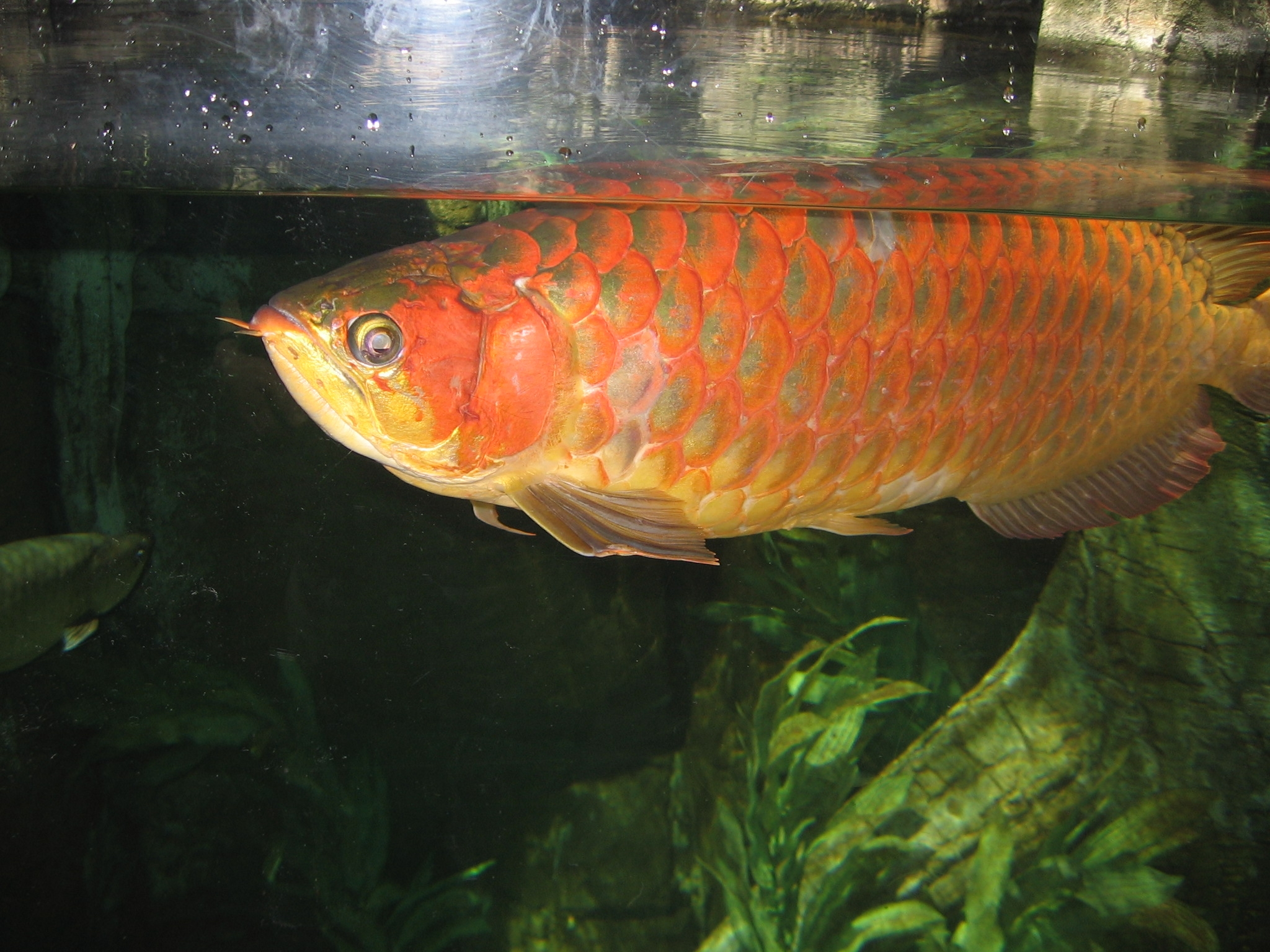
Super red arowana in a public aquarium

(video) Asian arowana swimming in a zoo in Japan

Several distinct, naturally occurring colour varieties are recognised as haplotypes, each found in a specific geographic region. They include:

- The green is the most common variety, found in Indonesia (Kalimantan and Sumatra), Vietnam, Myanmar, Thailand, Cambodia, and Malaysia.
- The silver Asian (not to be confused with the silver arowana, Osteoglossum bicirrhosum) is considered part of the green variety by some. It has two subvarieties, the "grey tail silver" or "Pinoh arowana", and the "yellow tail silver", each found in a different part of the island of Borneo.
- The red-tailed golden is found in northern Sumatra, Indonesia.
- The gold crossback, blue Malayan, or Bukit Merah blue is native to the state of Pahang and the Bukit Merah area in Perak, Peninsular Malaysia.
- The red, super red, blood red, or chili red is known only from the upper part of the Kapuas River and nearby lakes in western Indonesian part of Borneo.

In 2003, a study proposed splitting S. formosus into four separate species. This classification was based on both morphometrics and a phylogenetic analysis using the cytochrome b gene, and includes these species:

- Scleropages formosus was redescribed to include the strain known as the green arowana. The gold crossback, which was not part of the study, was included in this species by default, though it was suspected to be closely related to S. aureus.
- Scleropages macrocephalus described the silver Asian arowana.
- Scleropages aureus described the red-tailed golden arowana.
- Scleropages legendrei described the super red arowana.

The majority of researchers dispute this reclassification, arguing that the published data was insufficient to justify recognizing more than one Southeast Asian species of Scleropages, and that divergent haplotypes used to distinguish the color strains into isolated species were found within a single color strain, contradicting the findings. They are considered monotypic, consisting of closely related haplotypes.

== Description ==
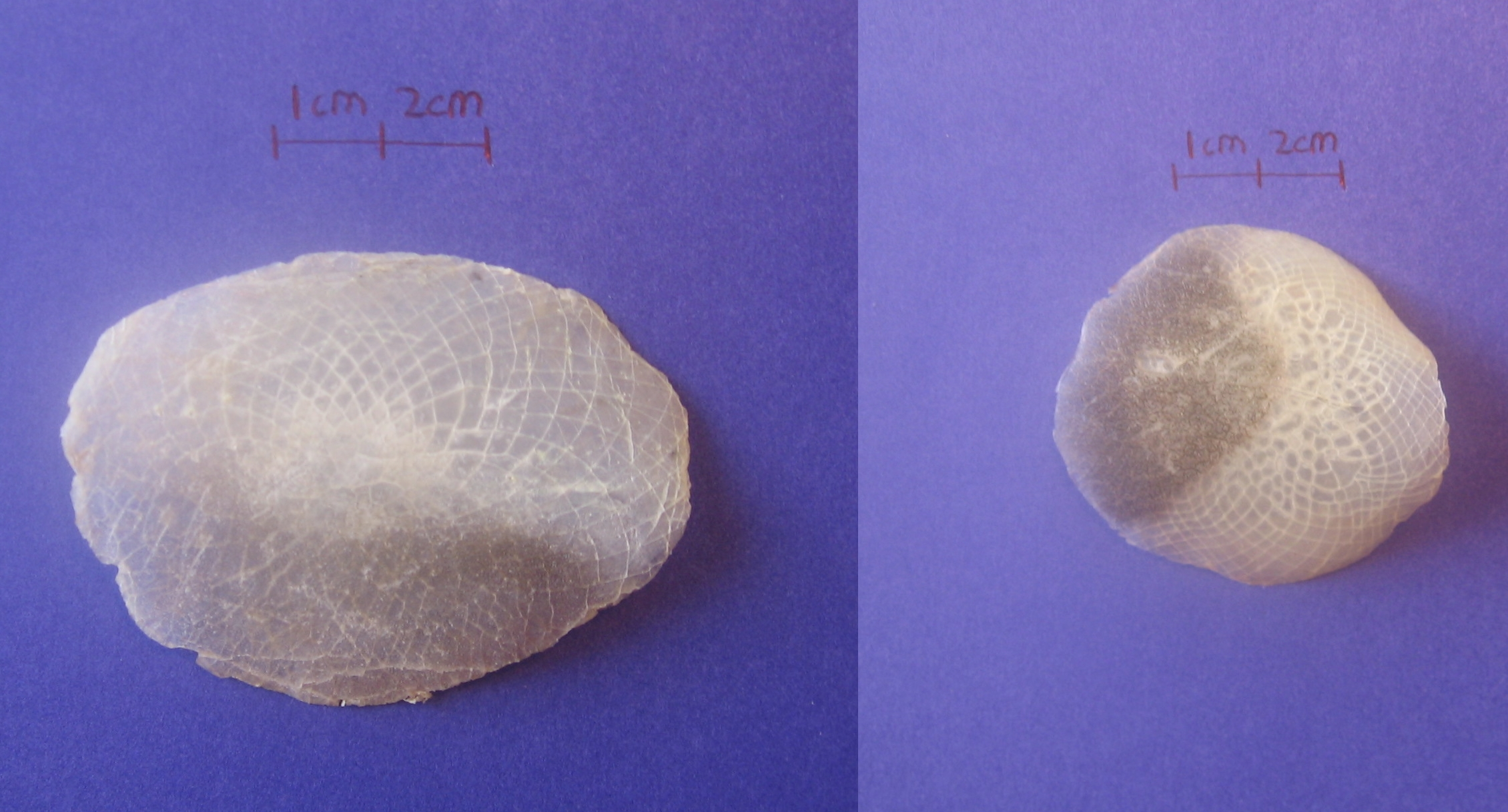
Asian arowana scales are large (most over 2 cm in length) and have a delicate net pattern.

Asian arowanas grow up to 90 cm (35 in) total length. Like all Scleropages, Asian arowanas have long bodies; large, elongated pectoral fins, dorsal and anal fins located far back on the body; and a much larger caudal fin than that of their South American relative, the silver arowana, Osteoglossum bicirrhosum. The mouth is oblique with a very wide gape. The prominent lower jaw has two barbels at its tip. The gill rakers are stout. Asian arowanas bear teeth on many bones of the mouth, including the jaws, vomer, palatines, pterygoids, parasphenoid, and tongue.

Asian arowana scales are large, cycloid, and, in some varieties, metallic-coloured, with a distinctive mosaic pattern of raised ribs. The lateral scales are arranged in horizontal rows numbered from the most ventral (first level) to the most dorsal (fifth level), with dorsal scales designated the sixth level.

Asian arowanas are distinguished from Australian congenerics Scleropages jardinii and Scleropages leichardti by having fewer (21–26) lateral line scales (versus 32–36 for the Australian species), longer pectoral and pelvic fins, and a longer anterior snout.

Green arowanas are dark green on the back, silvery or golden green on its sides, and silvery or whitish on the ventral surface, with dark greenish or bluish patches visible through the lateral scales. In mature fish, the top of the eye and the head behind the eye are bright emerald.

Both grey-tailed and yellow-tailed silver Asian arowanas are dark grey on the back and silver on the sides, with dark ring patches on the lateral scales and a silvery or whitish belly. In yellow-tailed specimens, the fin membranes are yellowish with dark-grey rays. In grey-tailed specimens, the fins are uniformly dark grey.

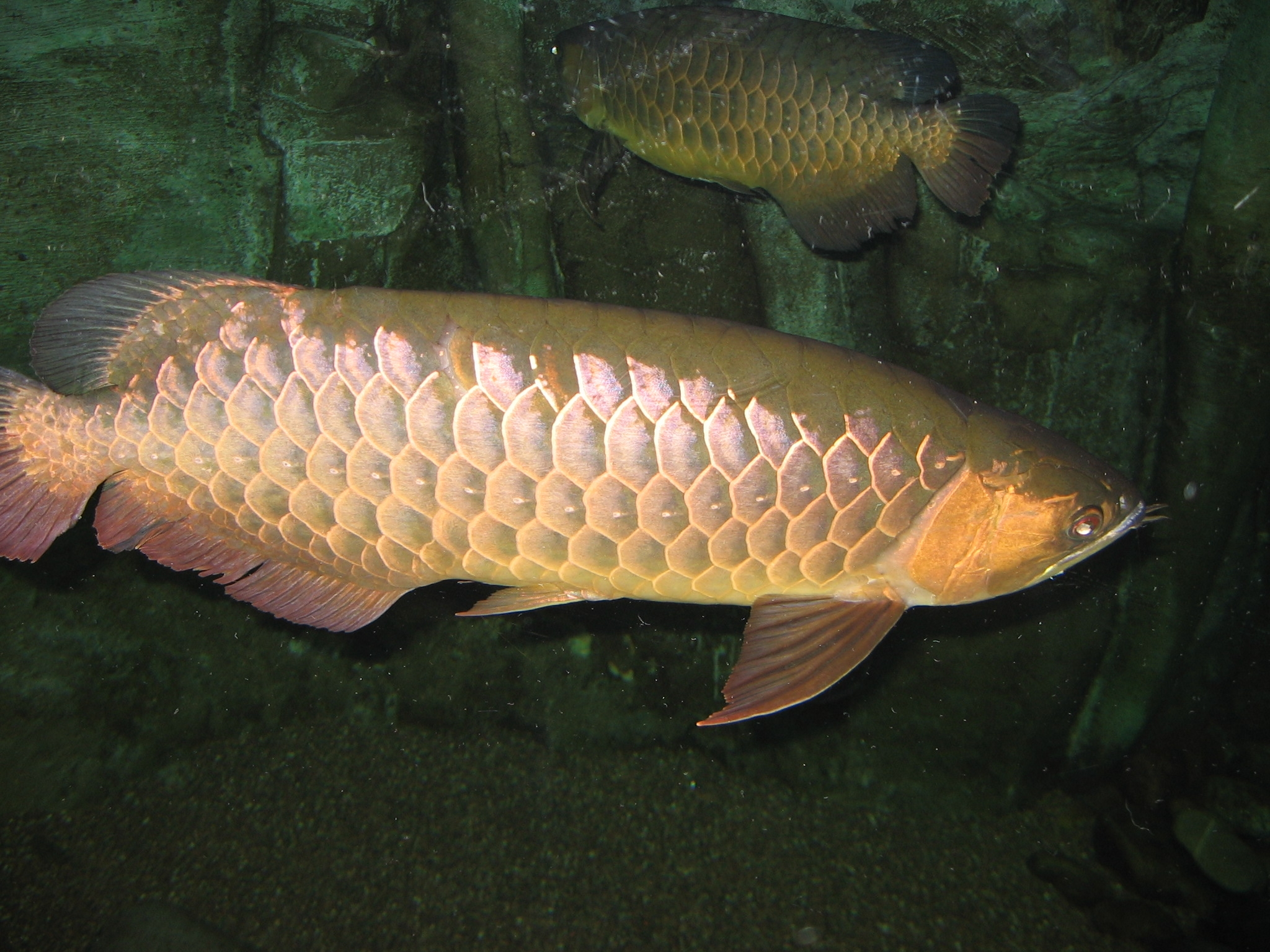
Red-tailed golden arowana: Although the scales are golden, the anal and caudal fins are reddish-brown.

Mature red-tailed golden arowanas have brilliant metallic gold lateral scales, gill covers, bellies, and pectoral and pelvic fin membranes, although the back is dark. In juveniles, the areas destined to develop golden colour start out metallic silver. The anal fin and the bottom portion of the caudal fin are light brown to dark red.

Mature gold crossback arowanas are distinguished from the red-tailed golden arowanas by having metallic gold crossing the back completely. This variety also lacks the reddish fins of the red-tailed golden.

In mature super red arowanas, the gill covers, lateral scales, and fin membranes of these fishes are metallic red, with the exact hue varying from gold-tinged to deep red. The back is dark brown. In juveniles, the darker the dorsal colouration, the deeper the red will be on maturity.

== Biology ==
=== Reproduction ===
Unlike most fish, the Asian arowana reaches sexual maturity relatively late, after 3–4 yr. The females produce few eggs, 30–100, which are quite large. After the eggs are fertilized, the Asian arowana exhibits great parental care with paternal mouthbrooding. Both the fertilized eggs and larvae are brooded within the male's mouth.

=== Behavior ===
They spend the day in the protection of Pandanus roots or other structures, and feed at night. It is normally seen alone or in small groups.

== Relationship with humans ==
=== Cultural beliefs ===
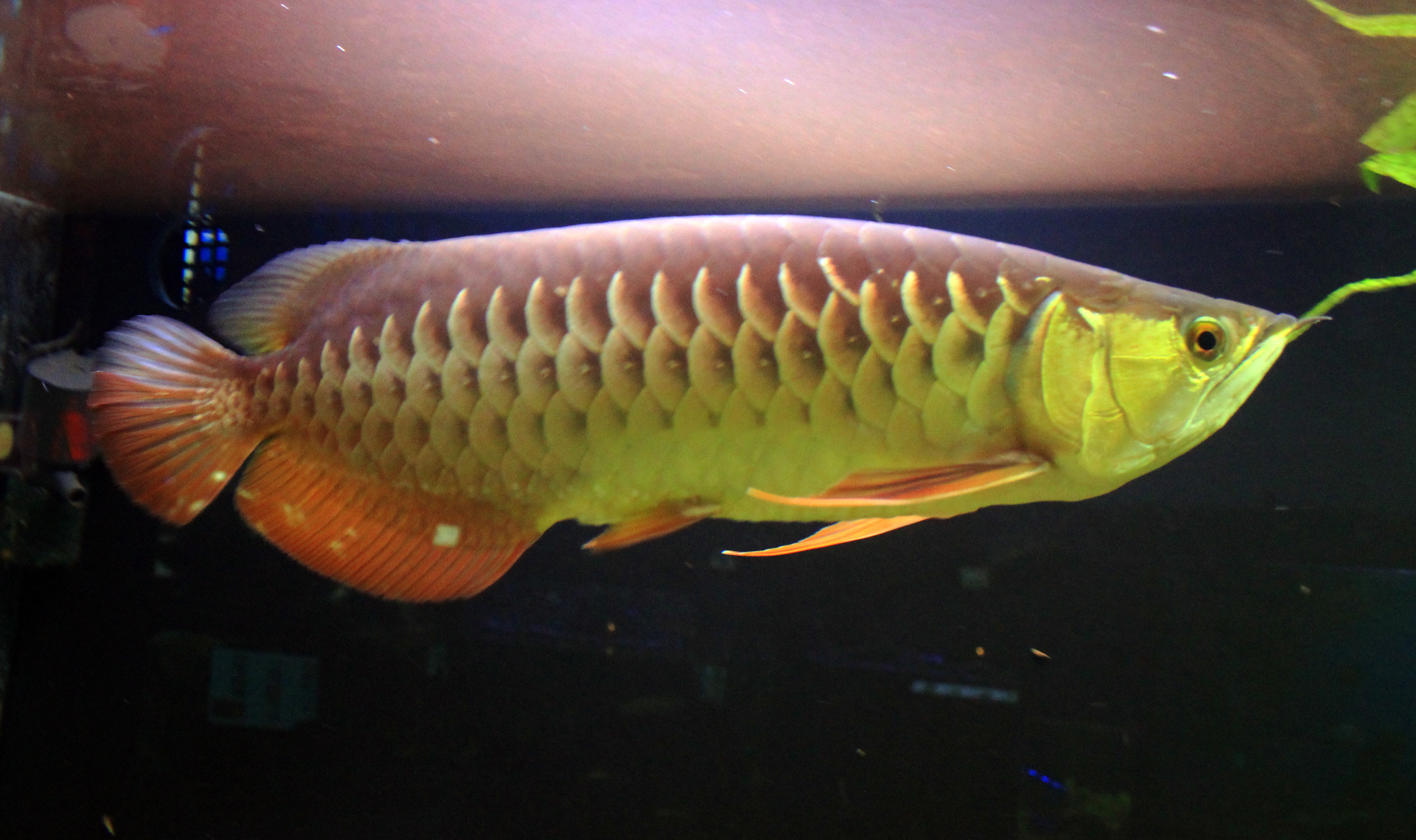
In Prague sea aquarium

Asian arowanas are considered to be symbols of good luck and prosperity, especially by those from Continental Asian cultures. This reputation derives from the species' resemblance to the Chinese dragon, considered an auspicious symbol in Chinese mythology. The large metallic scales and double barbels are features shared by the Chinese dragon, and the large pectoral fins are said to make the fish resemble "a dragon in full flight".

In Taoist divination, positive feng shui associations with water and the colours red and gold make these fishes popular for aquaria. One belief is that while water is a place where chi gathers, it is naturally a source of yin energy and must contain an "auspicious" fish such as an arowana to have balancing yang energy. Another is that a fish can preserve its owner from death by dying itself.

=== Conservation ===
Asian arowanas are listed as endangered by the current IUCN Red List, with the most recent evaluation taking place in 2019. International trade in these fishes is controlled under the Convention on the International Trade in Endangered Species of Wild Flora and Fauna (CITES), under which it was placed on Appendix I, the most restrictive category, in 1975. S. formosus is one of only eight fish species listed on Appendix I. A number of registered CITES breeders are in Asia, and the specimens they produce can be imported into several nations. Other nations restrict or prohibit possession of Asian arowanas; for example, the United States has listed this species under the Endangered Species Act, so it cannot be kept in that country without a permit.

Declining habitat is a major threat. For example, Asian arowanas are now uncommon in the Malay Peninsula, where they were once widely distributed, due to environmental destruction. Inclusion in the IUCN Red List was originally based not on biological reasons but on practical ones: though widely distributed throughout southeast Asia, they have been harvested heavily by aquarium collectors. However, habitat loss is likely a greater threat than aquarium collecting.

Additionally, considering the current confusion as to number of species, as well as the wide distribution, conservation status should be reconsidered. All strains are probably endangered, but some (notably the super red and red-tailed golden) more critically than others. The Asian arowana's high value as aquarium fish has impacted its conservation. Its popularity has soared since the late 1970s, and hobbyists may pay thousands of U.S. dollars for one of these animals. Certain color varieties are more endangered than others, since the red and gold varieties are both less common, and in higher demand in the aquarium trade.

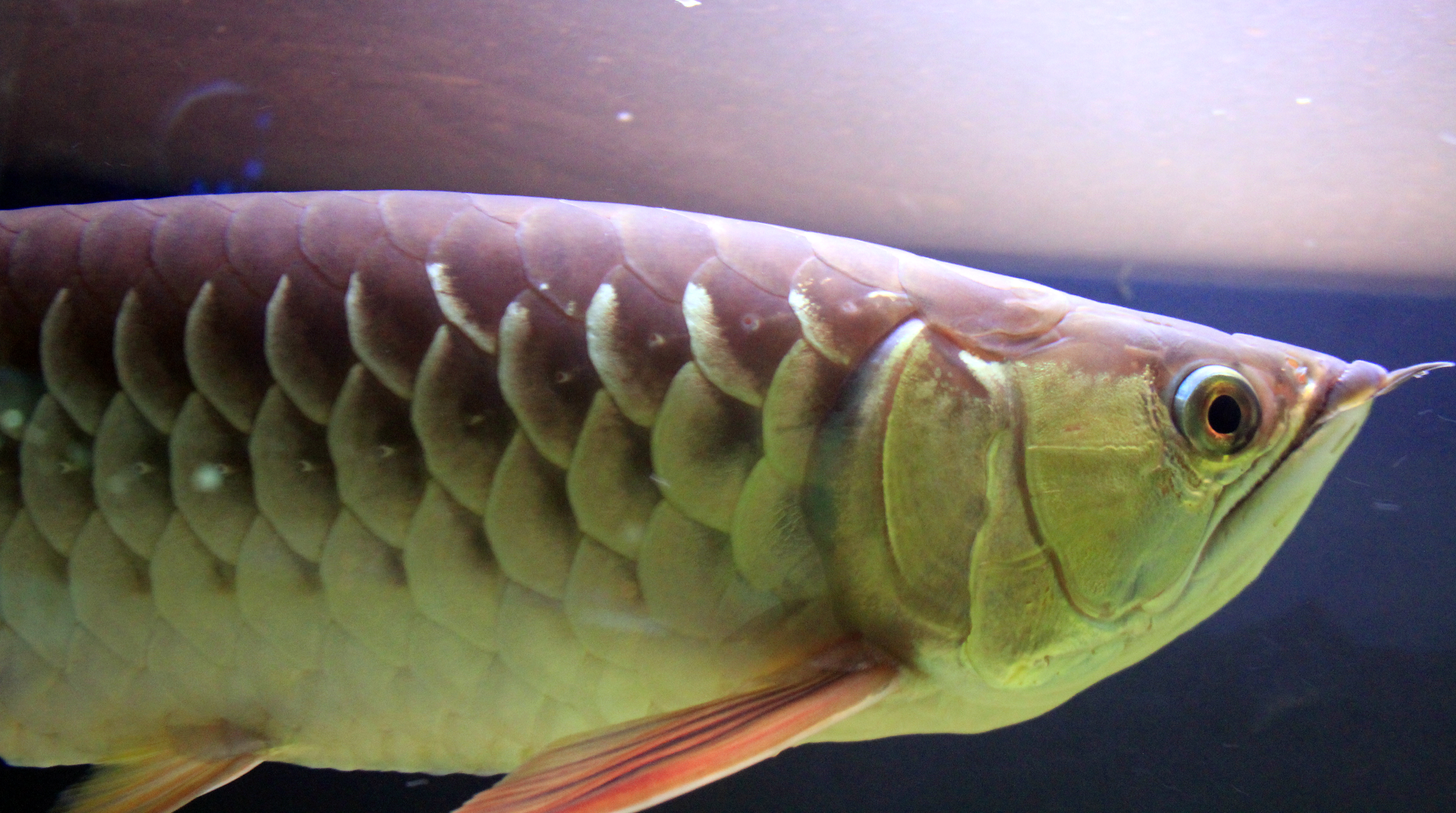
In Prague sea aquarium

Beginning in 1989, CITES began allowing Asian arowanas to be traded, provided certain criteria were met, most notably that they were bred in captivity on a fish farm for at least two generations. The first of these farms was in Indonesia. Later, the Singapore government's Agri-food and Veterinary Authority (then called the Primary Production Department) and a local fish exporter collaborated in a captive breeding program. Asian arowanas legally certified by CITES for trade became available from this program in 1994.

Captive-bred arowanas that are legal for trade under CITES are documented in two ways. First, fish farms provide each buyer with a certificate of authenticity and a birth certificate. Second, each specimen receives an implanted microchip, called a passive integrated transponder, which identifies individual animals.

Genetic fingerprinting has been used to assess the genetic diversity of a captive population at a Singapore fish farm to improve the management of this species. DNA markers that distinguish among different strains and between sexes have been identified, allowing aquaculturists to identify these characteristics in immature animals.

According to author Emily Voigt, the arowana has been cause for kidnappings, canings and even murder.

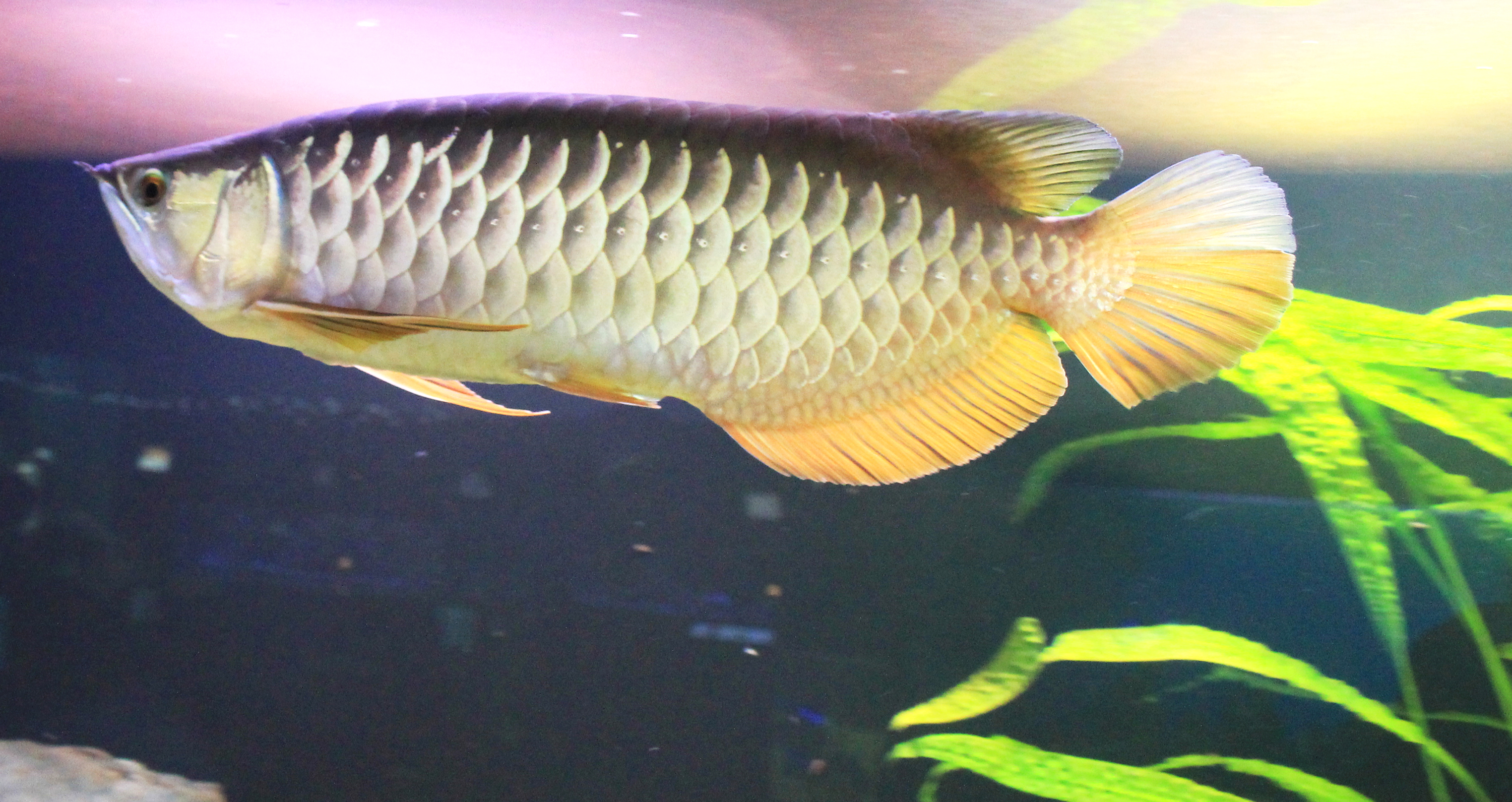
In Prague sea aquarium

=== Care in captivity ===
Because they can grow up to 90 cm (35 in) long, Asian arowanas require large aquaria. They are territorial and may be kept with other Scleropages only in a very large aquarium, provided all fish are of similar size. Like other arowanas, they need a tight-fitting cover to prevent escape. The water should be well-filtered, soft, and slightly acidic, and maintained at a temperature of 24–30 °C (75–86 °F).

Asian arowanas are carnivorous and should be fed a high-quality diet of meaty food, such as shrimp and crickets. They are surface feeders and prefer to take food in the upper parts of the water column. Aquarists recommend live foods and meaty prepared foods. Examples of appropriate live foods include scorpions, centipedes, mealworms, crickets, shrimps, feeder fish, small frogs, and earthworms. Prepared foods include prawns (shrimp), lean pork, frozen fish food, and pelleted food. Some captive arowanas are fed Koi fry in an attempt to increase the vibrancy of their natural coloration.

There are over 150 CITES-registered Asian arowana farms in Singapore, Malaysia, Indonesia and other Southeast Asia countries, producing Asian arowana for commercial purposes. But the actual number of Asian arowana farms in the world could be much higher than that, and probably over 350, of which most may not be registered in CITES yet. The total annual revenue of the Asian arowana sector was estimated at over US$200 million globally.

Possession of Scleropages formosus by private citizens is prohibited in Florida and New Mexico.

== See also ==
- List of freshwater aquarium fish species
