= African spoon-nose eel =

Conservation status
- Least Concern (IUCN 3.1)

Scientific classification
- Kingdom: Animalia
- Phylum: Chordata
- Class: Actinopterygii
- Order: Anguilliformes
- Family: Ophichthidae
- Genus: Mystriophis
- Species: M. rostellatus

Binomial name
- Mystriophis rostellatus (Richardson, 1848)

Synonyms
- Ophisurus rostellatus Richardson, 1848; Ophichthys rostellatus (Richardson, 1848)

Species of fish

The African spoon-nose eel (Mystriophis rostellatus, also known commonly as the west coast snake eel or simply snake eel,) is an eel in the family Ophichthidae (worm/snake eels). It was described by John Richardson in 1848. It is a tropical, marine eel which is known from the eastern Atlantic Ocean, including Mauritania and Namibia. It is known to dwell at an approximate depth of 40 metres, and inhabits lagoons and coastal waters. It leads a benthic lifestyle, burrowing into sand and mud. Males can reach a maximum total length of 140 centimetres, but more commonly reach a TL of 80 cm.

The African spoon-nose eel feeds primarily off of small finfish, shrimps and crabs. It is of minor commercial interest to fisheries.
