= Mystriophis crosnieri =

Conservation status
- Least Concern (IUCN 3.1)

Scientific classification
- Kingdom: Animalia
- Phylum: Chordata
- Class: Actinopterygii
- Order: Anguilliformes
- Family: Ophichthidae
- Genus: Mystriophis
- Species: M. crosnieri

Binomial name
- Mystriophis crosnieri Blache, 1971

Species of fish

Mystriophis crosnieri, known commonly as the spoon-nose eel in the United Kingdom, is an eel in the family Ophichthidae (worm/snake eels). It was described by Jacques Blache in 1971. It is a marine, tropical eel which is known from the eastern Atlantic Ocean, including Senegal, Angola, and the western Mediterranean. It dwells at a depth range of 75 to 300 metres (246 to 984 ft), and forms burrows in sand and mud sediments on the continental shelf. Males can reach a maximum total length of 96.5 centimetres (38.0 in).

The diet of M. crosnieri consists of benthic crustaceans.
