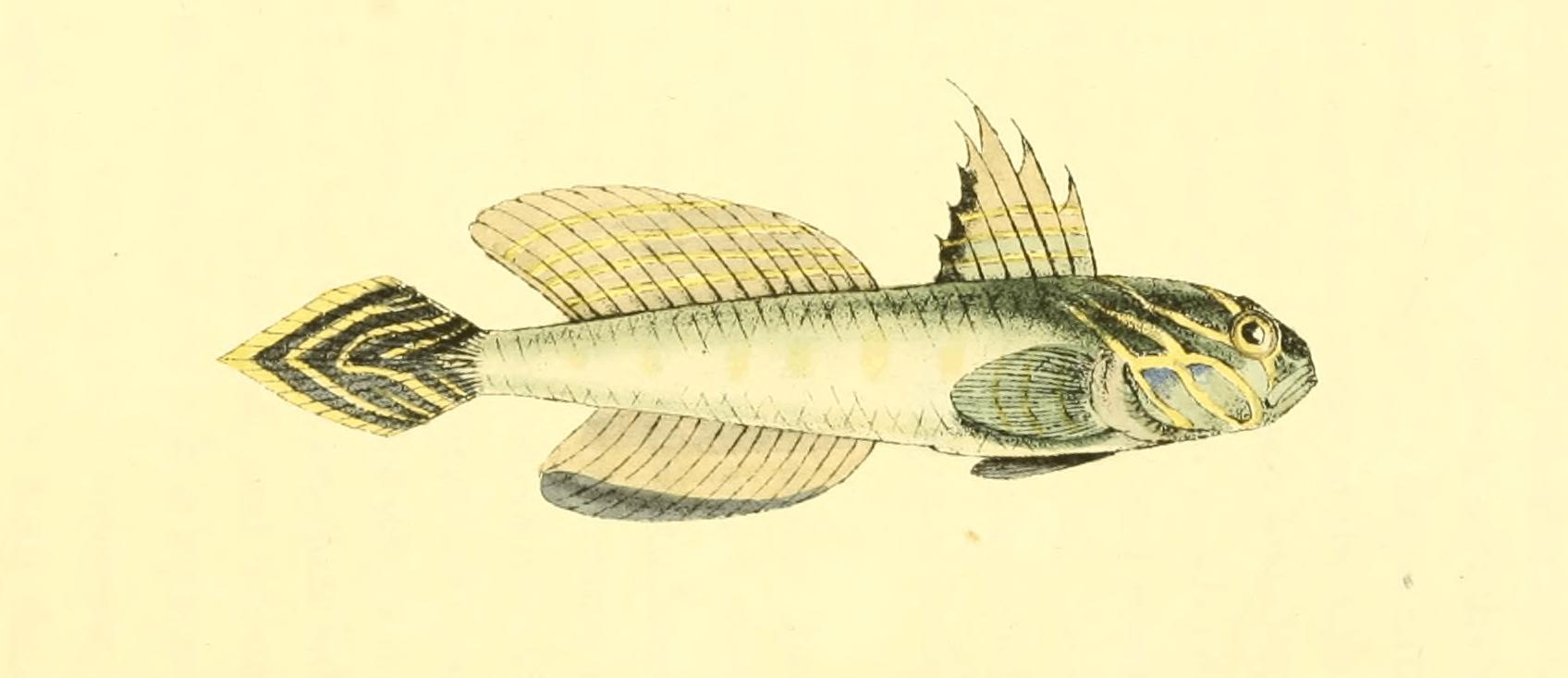

Scientific classification
- Kingdom: Animalia
- Phylum: Chordata
- Class: Actinopterygii
- Division: Teleostei
- Order: Gobiiformes
- Family: Gobiidae
- Genus: Lesueurigobius
- Species: L. suerii

Binomial name
- Lesueurigobius suerii (A. Risso, 1810)

Synonyms
- Gobius suerii A. Risso, 1810; Gobius lunve Nardo, 1824; Gobius lunie Nardo, 1827

= Lesueur's goby =

Species of fish

Lesueur's goby (Lesueurigobius suerii) is a species of goby native to the Eastern Atlantic Ocean near the coasts of the Canary Islands and Morocco as well as in the Mediterranean Sea. This species occurs at depths down to 230 metres (750 ft) through most of its range, though the population in the Ionian Sea are found much deeper, at depths of from 322 to 337 metres (1,056 to 1,106 ft). This species can reach a length of 5 centimetres (2.0 in) TL. This species can also be found in the aquarium trade The specific name honours the French naturalist Charles Alexandre Lesueur (1778-1846).
