= Aotearichthys =

Aotearichthys Temporal range: Late Oligocene

Scientific classification
- Kingdom: Animalia
- Phylum: Chordata
- Class: Actinopterygii
- Division: Teleostei
- Order: Ophidiiformes
- Family: Bythitidae
- Genus: †Aotearichthys
- Species: †A. vestalis

Binomial name
- †Aotearichthys vestalis Schwarzhans et al., 2017

Aotearichthys is an extinct genus of viviparous brotula that lived during the Chattian stage of the Oligocene epoch.

== Distribution ==
Aotearichthys vestalis is known from the Chatton Formation of New Zealand. It is only known from fossilized otoliths.
