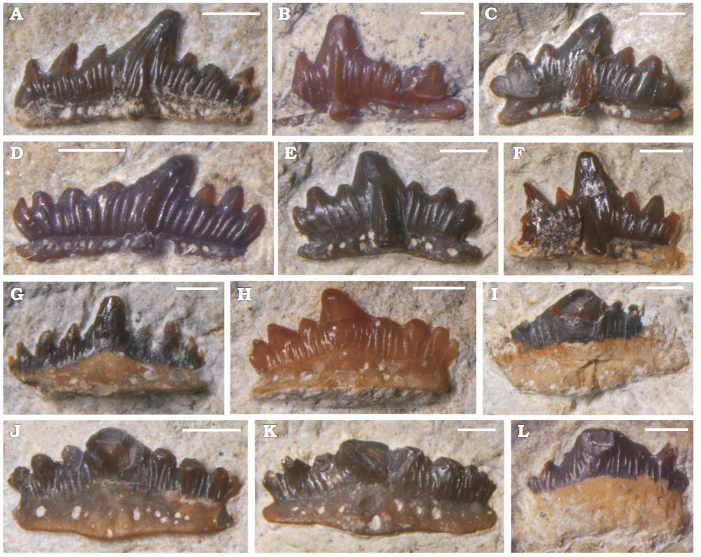
- Artiodus prominens teeth from the Early Permian of Russia

Scientific classification
- Kingdom: Animalia
- Phylum: Chordata
- Class: Chondrichthyes
- Clade: Euselachii
- Genus: †Artiodus; Ivanov, Duffin, & Naugolnyk, 2017
- Species: †A. prominens

Binomial name
- †Artiodus prominens Ivanov, Duffin, & Naugolnyk, 2017

= Artiodus =

Artiodus Temporal range: Early Permian

Extinct genus of cartilaginous fishes

Artiodus is an extinct genus of cartilaginous fish from the Permian period. The name comes from the type locality, the Arti River, combined with the Greek word for "tooth." It is currently monotypic, containing only the species Artiodus prominens from the Early Permian of the Middle Urals of Russia. As with many Paleozoic chondrichthyian genera, its affinities are unclear at this time.
