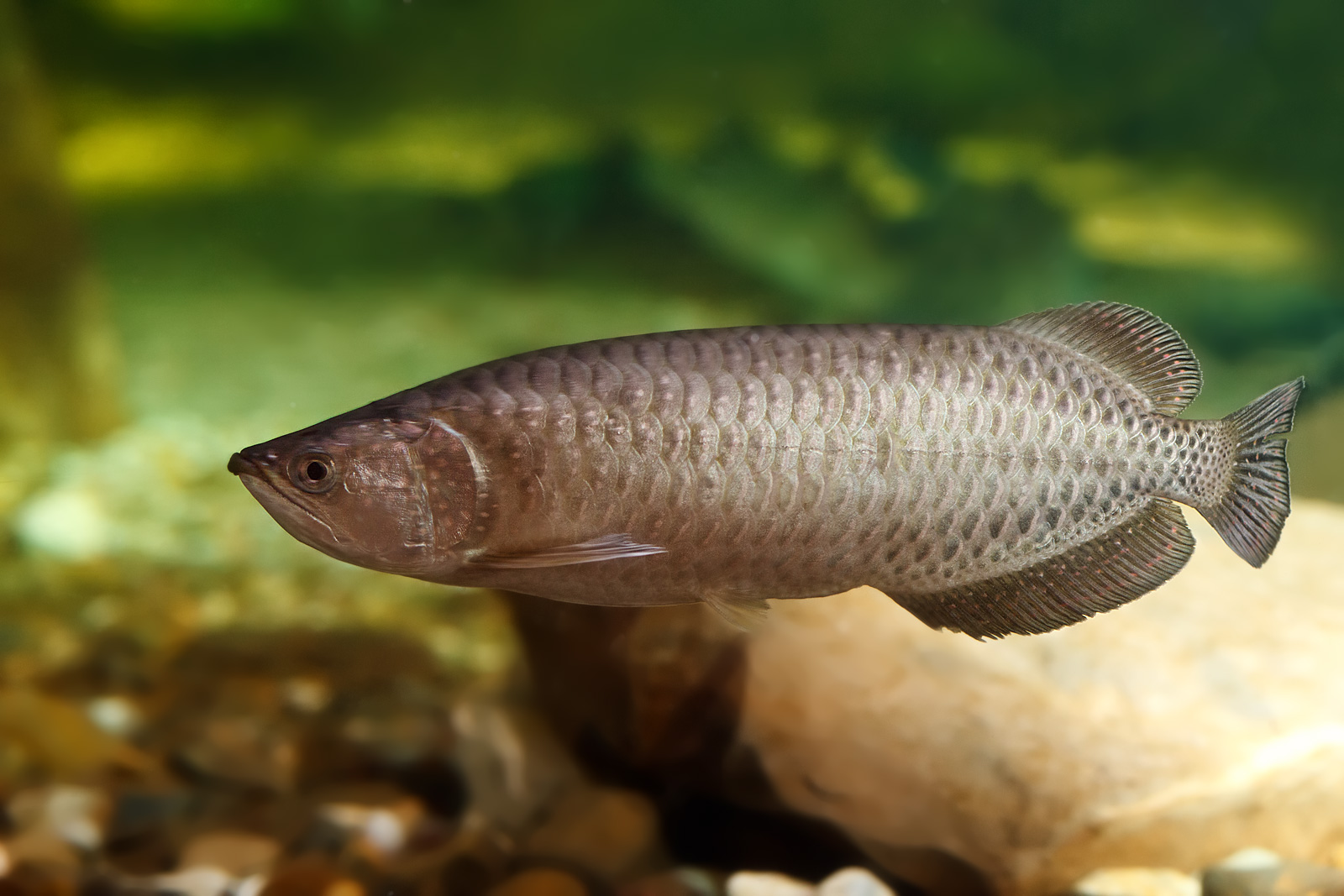
- Scleropages jardinii

Scientific classification
- Kingdom: Animalia
- Phylum: Chordata
- Class: Actinopterygii
- Division: Teleostei
- Order: Osteoglossiformes
- Family: Osteoglossidae
- Genus: Scleropages; Günther, 1864

Type species
- Scleropages leichardti Günther, 1864
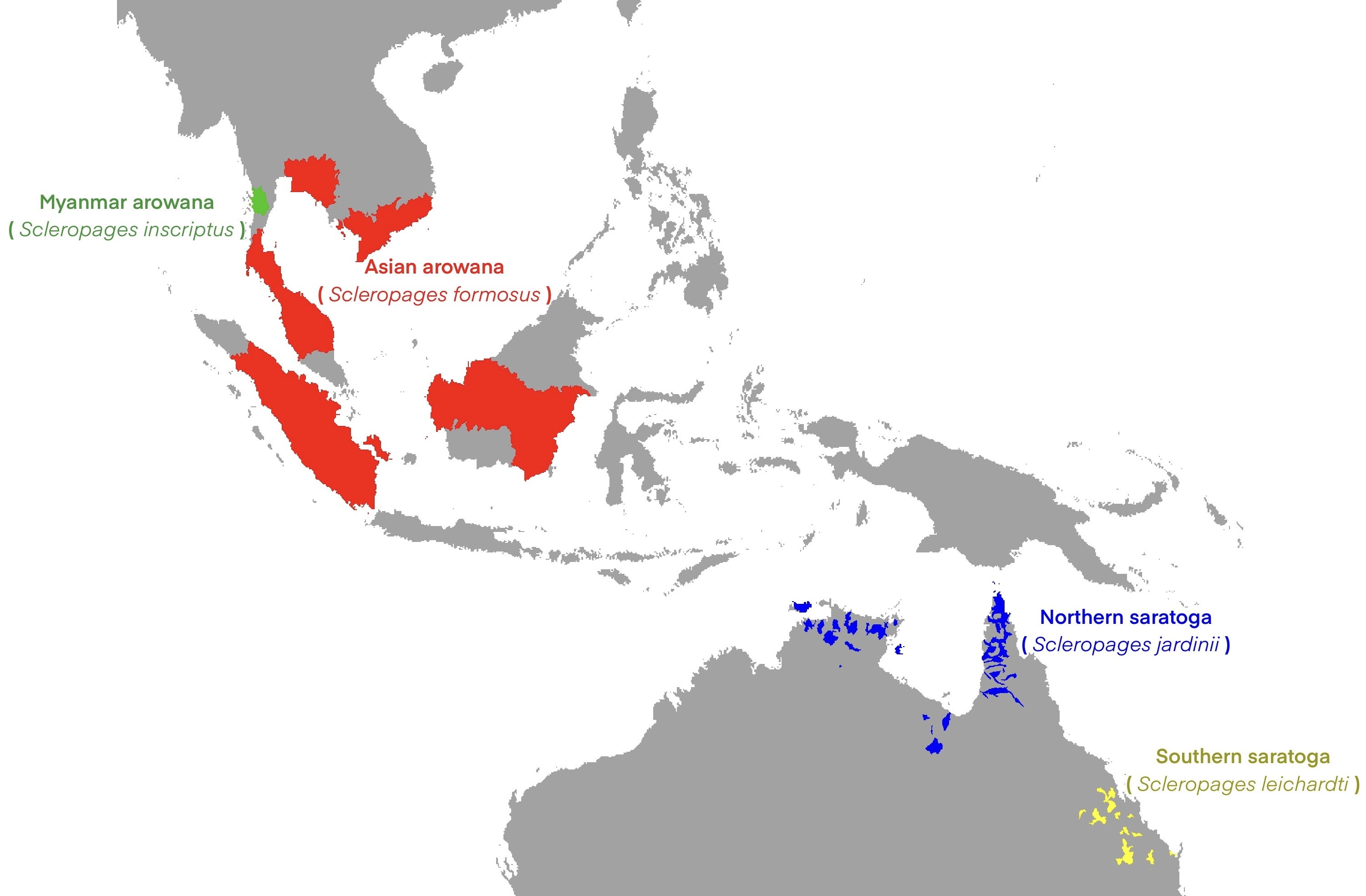
- Native range map

= Scleropages =

Asia-Pacific arowanas Temporal range: Middle Paleocene to present Possible Late Cretaceous record

Genus of fishes

Scleropages, the Asia-Pacific arowanas, is a genus of fish in the family Osteoglossidae found in Asia and Australia. All of these species are carnivorous and have great jumping ability. Fossil evidence supports their former presence in Europe & Africa.

== Taxonomy ==
These species are highly valued as aquarium fish, particularly by those from Asian cultures. In 2003, a study redescribed several naturally occurring color varieties of S. formosus into four separate species. The majority of researchers dispute these redescriptions, arguing that the published data are insufficient to justify recognizing more than one Southeast Asian species of Scleropages and that divergent haplotypes used to distinguish the color strains into isolated species were found within a single color strain, contradicting the findings. They are considered monotypic, consisting of closely related haplotypes based on color.

== Evolution ==
The unusual distribution of arowanas in both Asia and Australia (last connected during the Mesozoic), despite their freshwater habits, is unique and the subject of several competing hypotheses about when the ancestor of the Australian arowanas diverged from the ancestor of the Asian arowanas. Kumazawa & Nishida (2000) hypothesized that the two clades diverged about 140 million years ago, during the Early Cretaceous period, as a product of continental vicariance, when Insular India (containing the Asian Scleropages) & Madagascar broke off from the Australian & Antarctic landmass, fragmenting a population of ancestral Scleropages that inhabited East Gondwana during the Early Cretaceous. Lavoue (2015) also found evidence for a Cretaceous divergence between these two clades, but found it to post-date the fragmentation of East Gondwana, suggesting that the ancestral Scleropages dispersed over marine habitats to its present range during the Late Cretaceous. More recently, Cioffi et al (2019) firmly found that the divergence between the Asian and Australian arowanas only dates to the late Eocene, about 35 million years ago, suggesting that the current distribution of Scleropages is best explained by a late Paleogene marine dispersal between Asia and Australia, followed by extirpation of the genus in marine habitats, leaving only the freshwater species. However, fossils of this genus have not yet been definitively identified from marine deposits.

The genus had a much wider distribution during the early Cenozoic, with fossil remains known from the Paleocene of Niger and Belgium, and from the Eocene of China and Indonesia.

== Species ==
There are currently 4 recognized species in this genus:

Image	Scientific name	Common name	Distribution
	Scleropages formosus (S. Müller & Schlegel, 1840)	Asian bonytongue; green arowana, Asian arowana	Thailand, Cambodia, southern Vietnam, Malay Peninsula, Sumatra, West Borneo
	Scleropages inscriptus T. R. Roberts, 2012	Myanmar bonytongue, Scripted arowana, inscriptus arowana	Myanmar
	Scleropages jardinii (Saville-Kent, 1892)	Australian bonytongue, northern barramundi, Jardini arowana	Gulf of Carpentaria drainage system, west to the Adelaide River in the Northern Territory, throughout northern Queensland and in New Guinea
	Scleropages leichardti Günther, 1864	Spotted bonytongue/Saratoga	Fitzroy River system Australia

The following fossil species are also known:

- †Scleropages sanshuiensis Zhang, 2020 (Early Eocene of Guangdong, China)
- †Scleropages sinensis Zhang & Wilson, 2017 (Early Eocene of Hunan & Hubei, China)

In addition to these two fossil species known from complete skeletons, fossil remains of indeterminate Scleropages are also known from Middle Paleocene-aged freshwater deposits of Belgium, Late Paleocene-aged freshwater deposits of Niger, the Eocene-aged freshwater Sangkarewang Formation of Sumatra, Indonesia, and Neogene-aged deposits of Australia. The genus may potentially date to the Late Cretaceous, as fossil osteoglossid otoliths from the Maastrichtian-aged Intertrappean Beds of India closely resemble those of this genus, as does a partial jaw with teeth from the Campanian of France.

== Phylogeny ==
Phylogeny based on the work of Pouyaud, Sudarto & Teugels 2003.

- Osteoglossidae
  - Osteoglossum
    - Osteoglossum bicirrhosum
    - Osteoglossum ferreirai
  - Scleropages
    - (Delsmania)
      - - Scleropages formosus (Green arowana)
        - Scleropages macrocephalus Pouyaud, Sudarto & Teugels 2003 (Silver Indonesian arowana)
      - - Scleropages legendrei Pouyaud, Sudarto & Teugels 2003 (Super red/blood Indonesian arowana)
        - Scleropages aureus Pouyaud, Sudarto & Teugels 2003 (Indonesian/red-tailed golden arowana)
    - (Scleropages)
      - Scleropages leichardti
      - Scleropages jardinii
