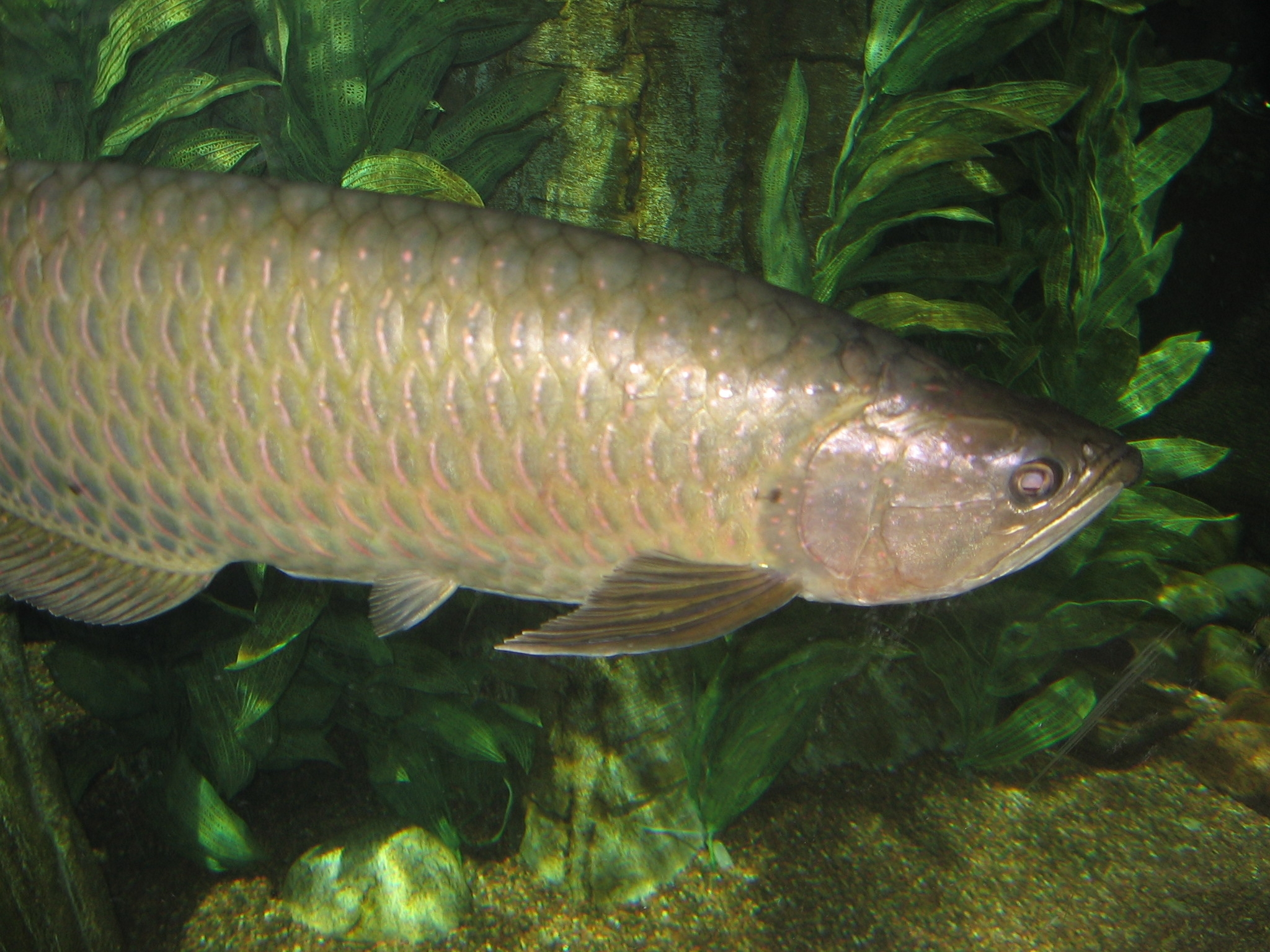

Conservation status
- Least Concern (IUCN 3.1)

Scientific classification
- Kingdom: Animalia
- Phylum: Chordata
- Class: Actinopterygii
- Division: Teleostei
- Order: Osteoglossiformes
- Family: Osteoglossidae
- Genus: Scleropages
- Species: S. jardinii

Binomial name
- Scleropages jardinii (Saville-Kent, 1892)
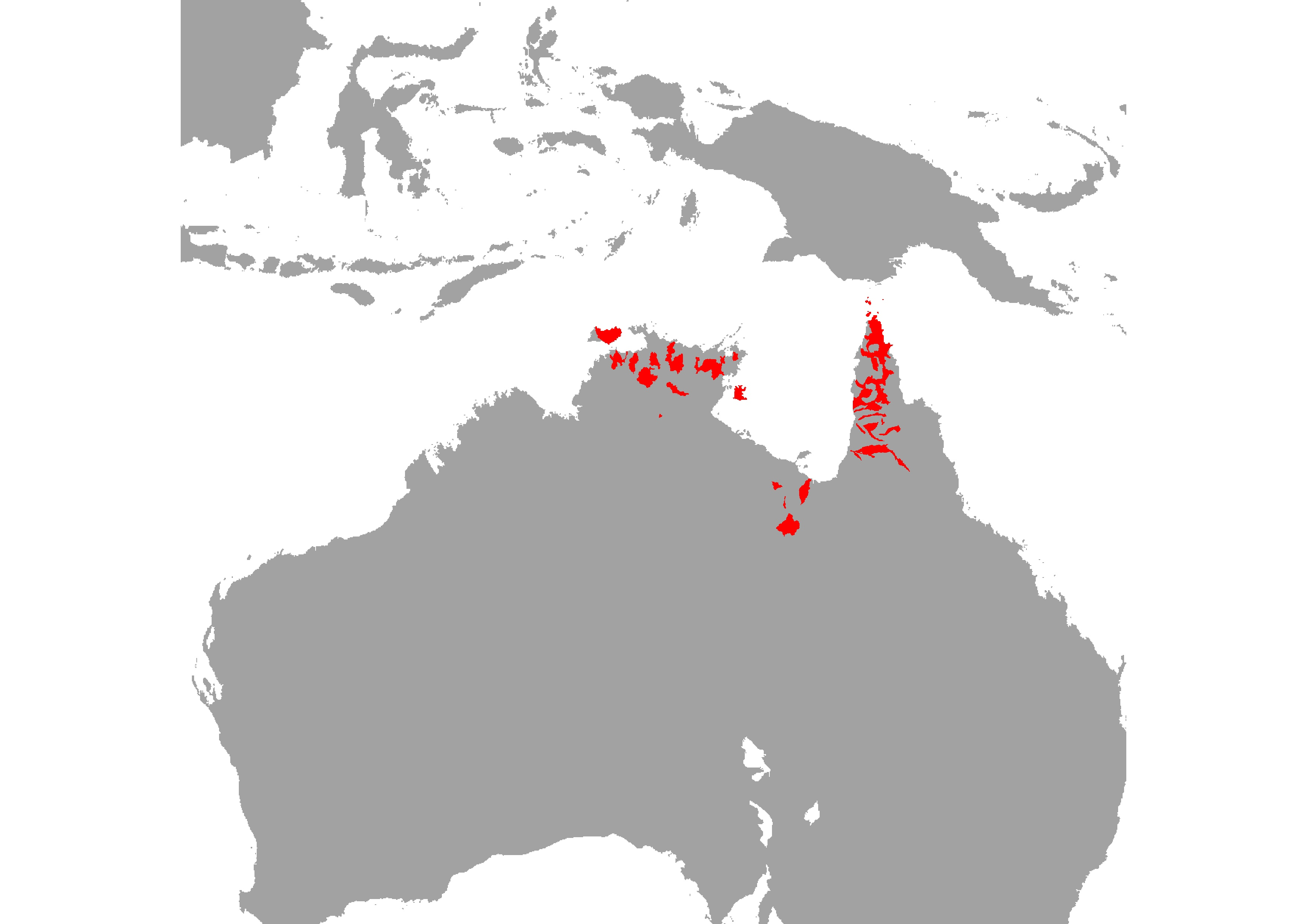

= Scleropages jardinii =

Species of fish

Scleropages jardinii, the Gulf saratoga, Australian bonytongue, pearl arowana or northern saratoga, is a freshwater bony fish native to Australia and New Guinea, one of two species of fishes sometimes known as Australian arowana, the other being Scleropages leichardti. It has numerous other common names, including northern saratoga, toga and barramundi (not to be confused with the barramundi perch, Lates calcarifer). It is a member of the subfamily Osteoglossinae, a (basal) teleost group. Its scientific name is sometimes spelled S. jardini.

== Distribution ==
Scleropages jardinii is patchily distributed throughout most of the Gulf of Carpentaria drainage system, west to the Adelaide River in the Northern Territory, throughout northern Queensland and in central-southern New Guinea. It inhabits still clear waters of pools and billabongs, and the slow-flowing sections of streams.

It is not considered endangered or threatened either by the CITES conventions or the IUCN Red List.

== Description ==
This fish has a long, dark-colored body with seven rows of large scales, each with several reddish or pinkish spots arranged in a crescent shape around the trailing edge of the scale, giving it a pearly appearance. It has large, wing-like pectoral fins. Except for duller coloration and smaller scale size, it appears very similar to the Asian arowana, S. formosus. It grows to a length of about 90 cm (35 in). Its maximum weight is recorded as 17.2 kg (38 lb), but one report suggests it has been known to weigh as much as 27 kg (60 lb). The depth of the bodies of adults is approximately 25–28% of the Standard Length, making this a more robust fish than its Australian cousin S. leichardti.

Like other arowanas, it is a mouthbrooder, but unlike the Asian arowana, reports suggest the female rather than the male broods the young in her mouth.

Due to their resemblance to the Asian arowanas they are sometimes sold in the name of golden arowana in some of the Asian countries, like India. However, they can be easily distinguished from the Asian arowanas by identifying their red spotted fins and 7–8 rows of scales on their body.

== Diet ==
Gulf saratoga are opportunistic carnivores, feeding on aquatic and terrestrial insects, small fishes and crustaceans.

== See also ==
- List of freshwater aquarium fish species
