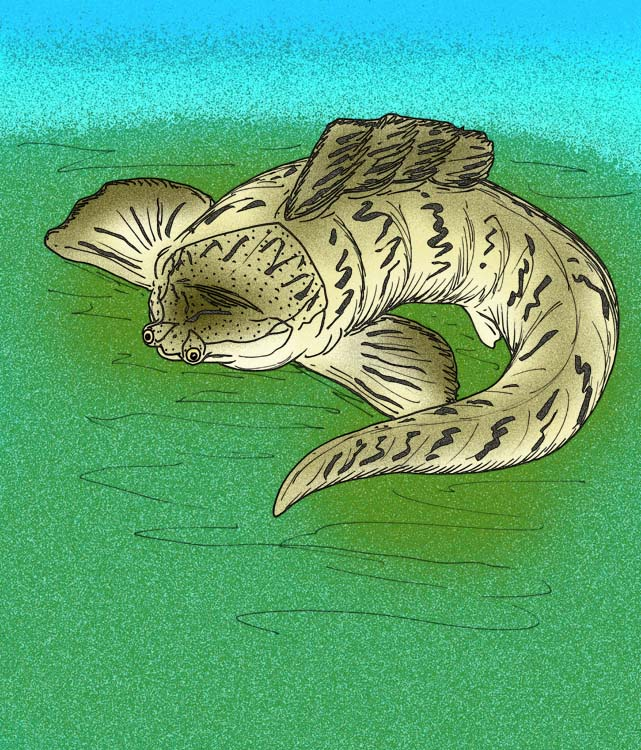
- Life reconstruction of Herasmius granulatus

Scientific classification
- Kingdom: Animalia
- Phylum: Chordata
- Class: †Placodermi
- Order: †Arthrodira
- Suborder: †Brachythoraci
- Family: †Heterosteidae
- Genus: †Herasmius; Ørvig, 1969

Species
- Herasmius granulatus Orvig, 1969 (Type); Herasmius dayi Schultze & Cumbaa, 2017

= Herasmius =

Herasmius Temporal range: Devonian, 422.9–385.3 Ma

Extinct genus of fishes

Herasmius is an extinct genus of heterosteid placoderm from the Devonian period. Fossils have been discovered freshwater deposits in Norway and Canada.

== Description ==
The type species Herasmius granulatus was discovered in early Eifelian-aged freshwater deposits from the Wood Bay Group on the island of Spitsbergen in the Svalbard archipelago of Norway, and was described in 1966 by Ørvig based on an incomplete skull. It was placed in the family Heterostiidae along with the genus Heterosteus. Herasmius is smaller than Heterosteus, and also differs by having a comparatively broader, shorter skull.

A second species, Herasmius dayi, was described in 2017 by Schultze & Cumbaa, found in Lower Devonian marine deposits of the Bear Rock Formation along the Anderson River of Northwest Territories, Canada.
