= Mystriophis =

Scientific classification
- Kingdom: Animalia
- Phylum: Chordata
- Class: Actinopterygii
- Order: Anguilliformes
- Family: Ophichthidae
- Subfamily: Ophichthinae
- Genus: Mystriophis; Kaup, 1856

Type species
- Ophisurus rostellatus Richardson, 1848

Species
- See text.

Genus of fishes

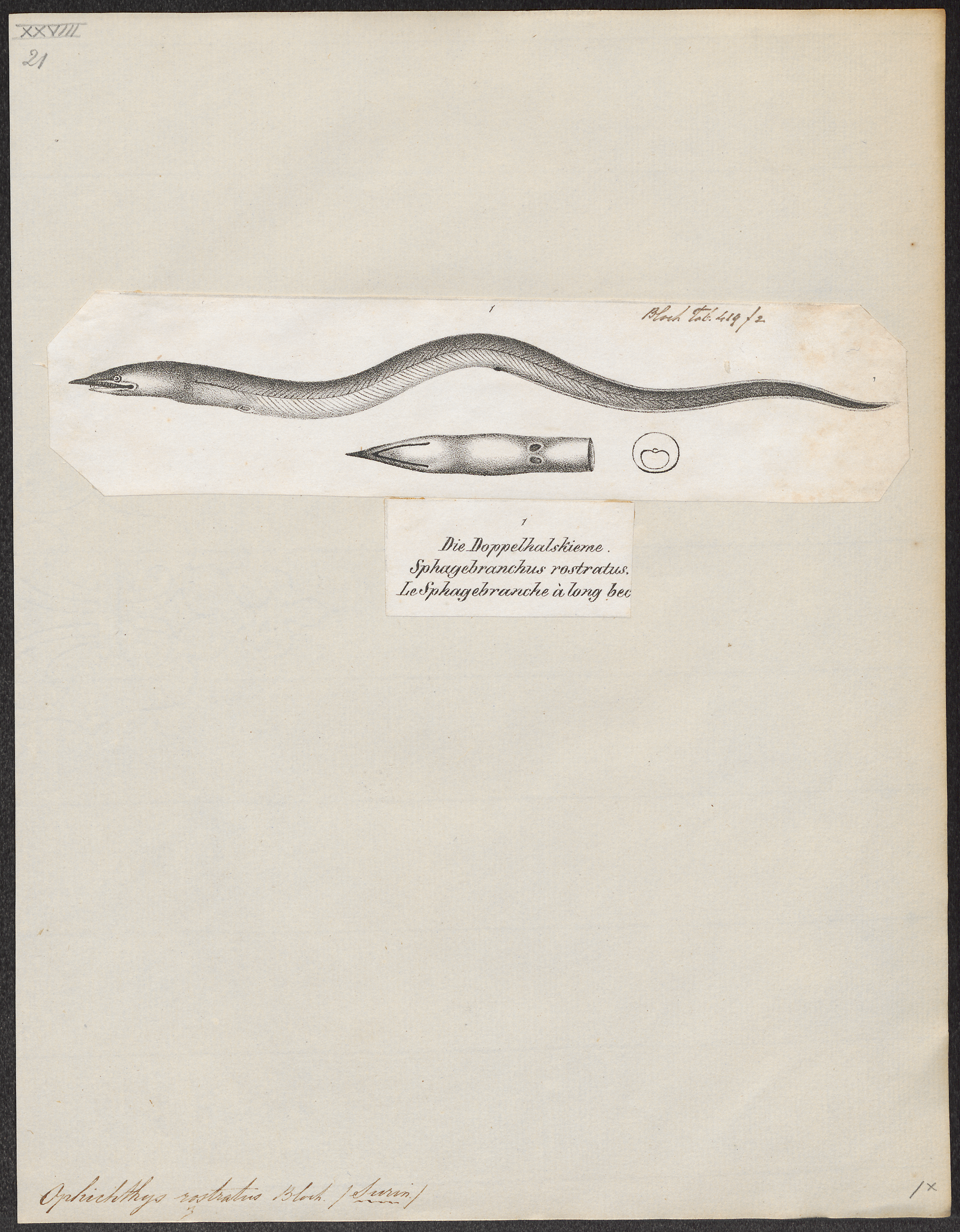
An illustration of Mystriophis rostellatus in Iconographia Zoologica, a 19th-century collection of zoological images

Mystriophis is a genus of eels in the snake eel family Ophichthidae. It currently contains the following species:

- Mystriophis crosnieri Blache, 1971
- Mystriophis rostellatus (J. Richardson, 1848) (African spoon-nose eel)
