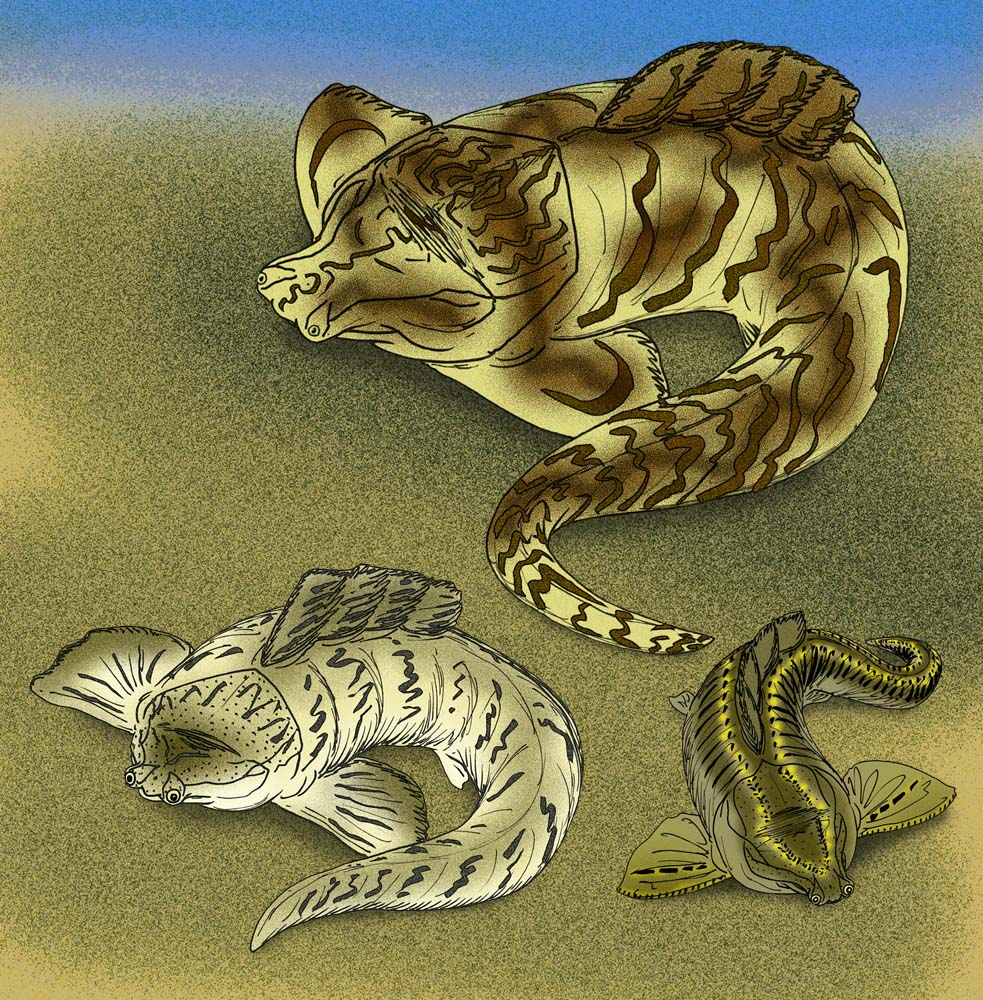
- Comparison of genera

Scientific classification
- Kingdom: Animalia
- Phylum: Chordata
- Class: †Placodermi
- Order: †Arthrodira
- Suborder: †Brachythoraci
- Clade: †Eubrachythoraci
- Clade: †Pachyosteomorphi
- Superfamily: †Dunkleosteoidea
- Family: †Heterosteidae; Jaekel, 1903

Genera
- Herasmius; Heterosteus; Yinostius

= Heterosteidae =

Heterosteidae Temporal range: Devonian: Emsian to Givetian, 407.6–382.7 Ma

Extinct family of fish

Heterosteidae (also known as Heterostiidae) is an extinct family of moderately large to giant, flattened, benthic arthrodire placoderms with distinctive, flattened, triangular skulls that are extremely broad posteriorly, but become very narrow anteriorly.

Heterosteidae belongs to the superfamily Dunkleosteoidea, a relative of the giant Dunkleosteus, as shown in the cladogram below:

- Dunkleosteoidea
  - Eastmanosteus calliaspis
  - - - Eastmanosteus pustulosus
      - Kiangyousteus yohii
    - - Golshanichthys asiatica
      - - Westralichthys uwagedensis
        - - - Dunkleosteus raveri
            - Dunkleosteus terrelli
          - - Dunkleosteus amblyodoratus
            - Heterostiidae
              - Heterosteus ingens
              - Yinosteus major

== Genera ==
Herasmius Orvig, 1969

Heterosteus Asmuss, 1856

Yinostius J. Wang & N. Wang, 1984
