= Dercetis =

Dercetis is the name of a nymph in Greek mythology.

== Mythology ==
In Statius' Thebaid, she is portrayed as a sexually aggressive figure who ravishes a youth named Lapithaon despite his being too young and not mature enough for a sexual relationship. From their union is born Alatreus, said to have later become a rival of his own father in terms of youthful good looks: the two could be easily mistaken for brothers thanks to the small age difference. The story of Dercetis, Lapithaon and Alatreus is told to Antigone by her old tutor as she is asking him questions about participants of the war of the Seven against Thebes, Lapithaon and Alatreus being two of those. Further in the poem, it is noted of Alatreus that he was still a boy at the time, but already valiant enough for his father to be proud of him.
