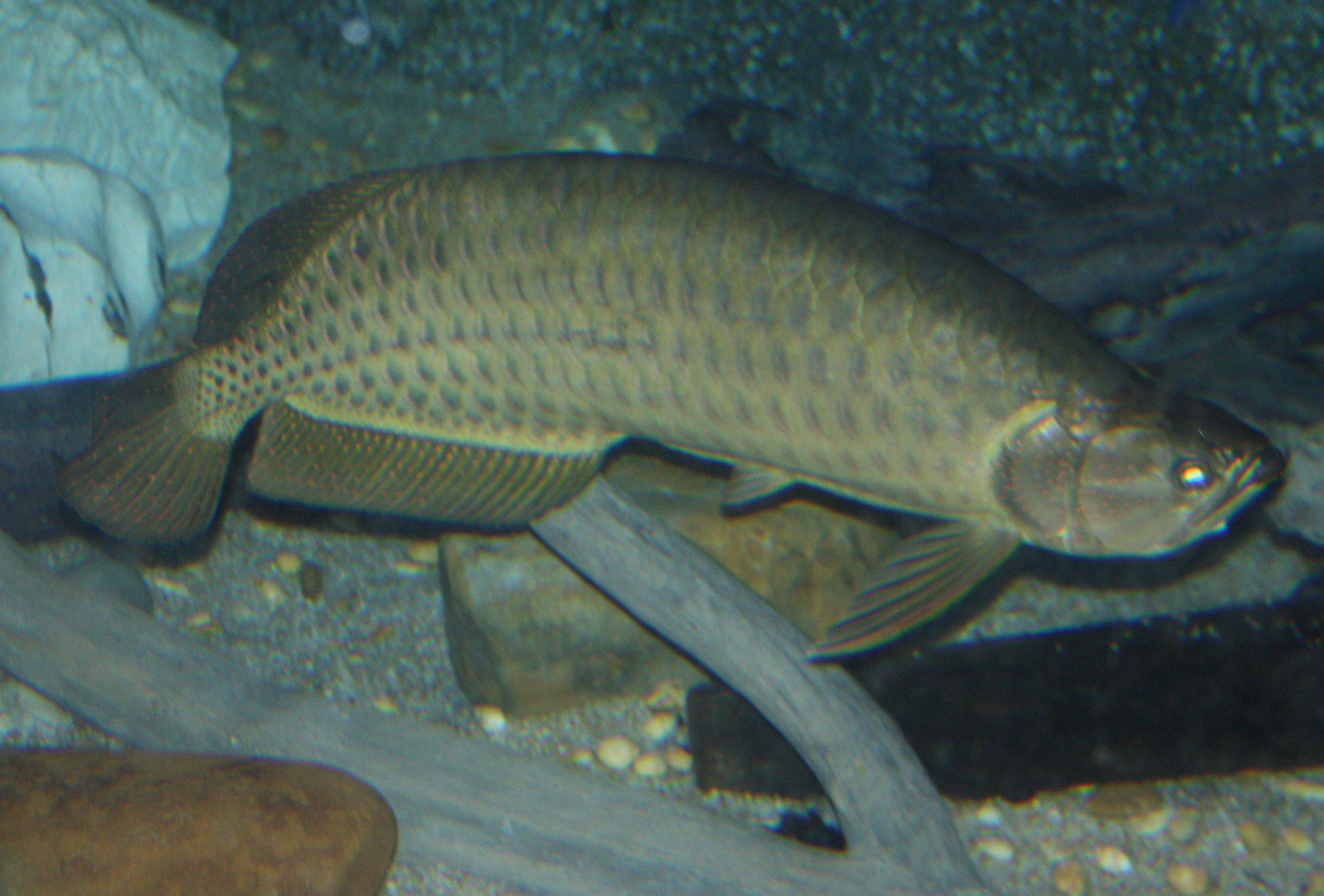

Conservation status
- Near Threatened (IUCN 3.1)

Scientific classification
- Kingdom: Animalia
- Phylum: Chordata
- Class: Actinopterygii
- Order: Osteoglossiformes
- Family: Osteoglossidae
- Genus: Scleropages
- Species: S. leichardti

Binomial name
- Scleropages leichardti (Günther, 1864)
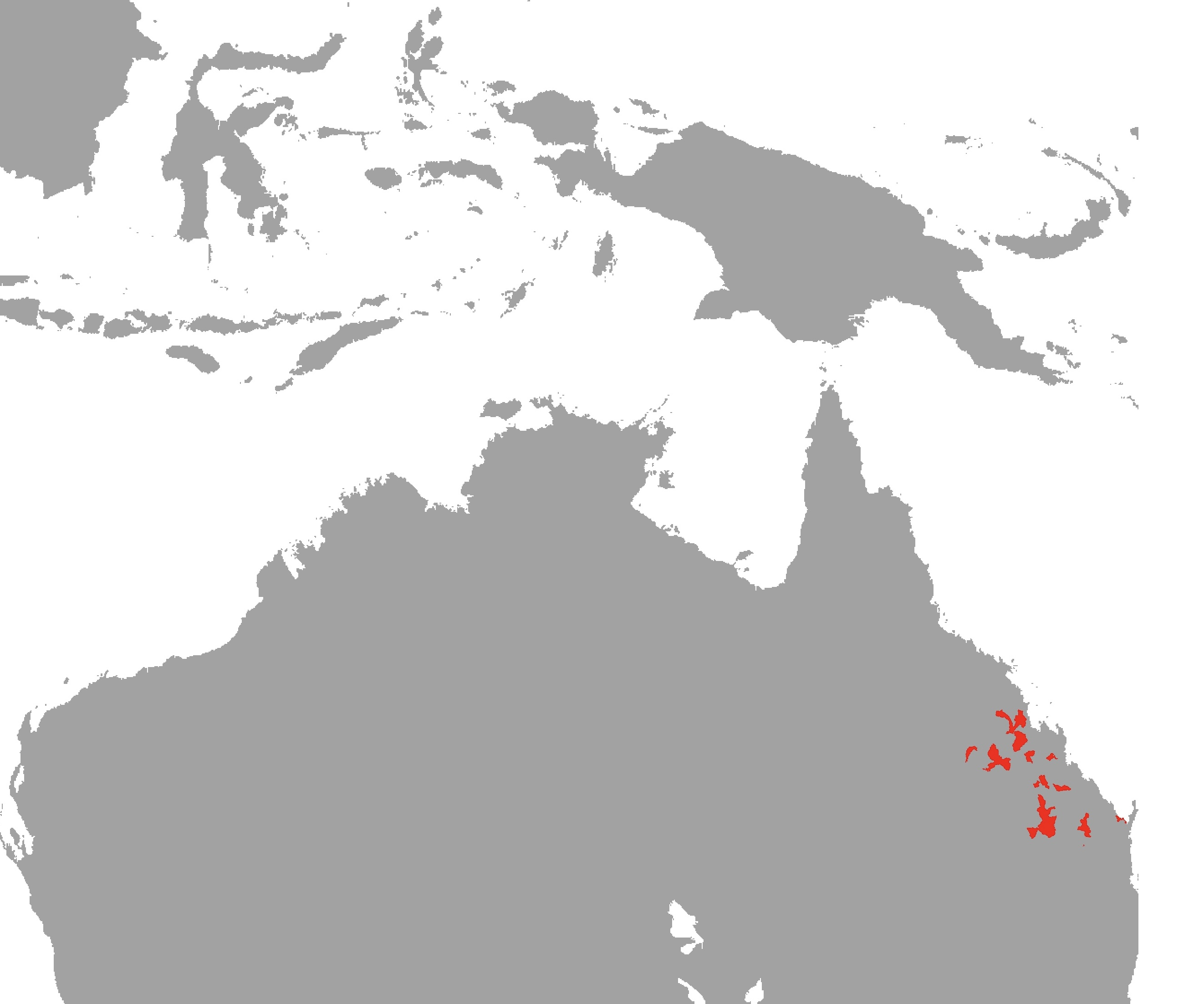

= Southern saratoga =

Species of fish

The southern saratoga (Scleropages leichardti), also known as the spotted bonytongue, spotted saratoga, or simply saratoga, is a freshwater bony fish native to Australia. It belongs to the subfamily Osteoglossinae, or arowanas, a primitive group of teleosts. Like all arowanas, it is a carnivorous mouthbrooder. Along with the gulf saratoga (Scleropages jardinii), the saratoga is also known as the Australian arowana (mainly by non-Australian aquarists) and barramundi, although the latter name is nowadays reserved in Australia for the only distantly related Lates calcarifer.

This species is found in turbid waters and has a more restricted distribution than the other Scleropages native to Australia, Scleropages jardinii.

== Description ==
Southern saratoga can grow up to 90 centimetres (35 in) 4 kilograms (8.8 lb). At sexual maturity, they are usually 48–49 centimetres (19–19 in) in length. They are primitive, surface-dwelling fish with strongly compressed bodies. They have an almost perfectly flat back, with a dorsal fin set back towards the tail of their long bodies. In colouration, they are dark brown to olive green along the back, with lighter sides and a white belly. The large, bony scales have small orange or red dots. The lower jaw slopes steeply upwards and carries two fleshy barbels on the chin.

Like all Scleropages, S. leichardti is a long-bodied fish with large scales, large pectoral fins, and small paired barbels on its lower jaw. Each scale on its dark coloured body has a red or pink spot; this feature distinguishes it from S. jardinii, which has several reddish spots on each scale in a crescent shape. S. leichardti is a slimmer fish than other Scleropages; a 90 centimetres (35 in) fish was weighed at only 4 kilograms (8.8 lb), compared to 17.2 kilograms (38 lb), for a S. jardinii of similar length. The depth of its body is 23–25% of its Standard Length, and it has fewer fin rays than S. jardinii. It is a popular aquarium fish, although it will eat other fish, shrimp, yabbies etc., that are in the tank.

== Distribution and habitat ==
Southern saratoga are native to the Fitzroy River system. They are commonly found in freshwater impoundments on the Mary, Dawson and Burnett rivers. Stocks have also been introduced to dams on the Brisbane, North Pine and Noosa Rivers. Southern saratoga prefer still waters and slow flowing sections of rivers and can be found sheltering in lily-pads or below fallen timber. They are very aggressive and territorial fish.

== Conservation status ==
This species is not currently listed on any CITES appendix. . Its IUCN Red List status is Lower Risk/near threatened (LT/nt). Although it does not occur naturally in Indonesia, it is a protected species in that country.

It has been stocked in a number of dams in Queensland, Australia.
