= August Wilhelm Malm =

Swedish zoologist, entomologist and malacologist

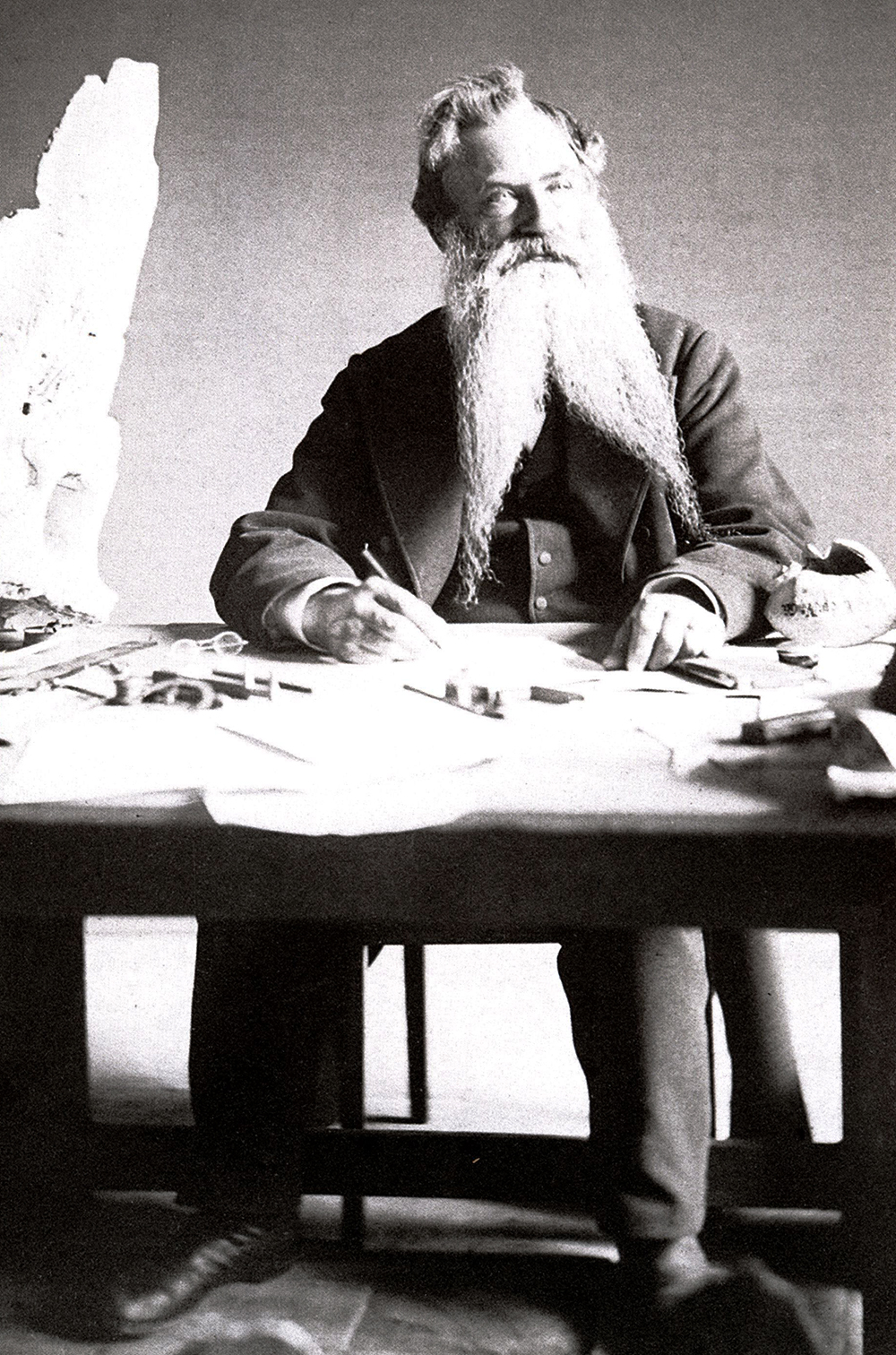
August Wilhelm Malm

August Wilhelm Malm (23 July 1821 – 5 March 1882) was a Swedish zoologist, entomologist and malacologist. He was the first Director of the Gothenburg Natural History Museum.

== Biography ==
August Wilhelm Malm was born in Lund, Sweden. Malm was generally self-taught without an academic degree. In the years 1838–1839, he was student and assistant of Sven Nilsson (1787–1883), professor of Natural History at Lund University. He worked from 1840 as an assistant of Carl Jakob Sundevall (1801–1875) at the Swedish Museum of Natural History, zoological department in Stockholm. He studied zoology in Copenhagen during 1843–44.

From 1848, he was curator of the Gothenburg Natural History Museum (Göteborgs Naturhistoriska Museum). From 1852, he was a teacher of zoology at Gothenburg high school. From 1856-67, he is also the supervisor of Gothenburg and Bohus County Fisheries.

When the Gothenburg Museum was founded in 1861, the founding group included August Malm together with newspaper publisher Sven Adolf Hedlund (1821–1900) and architect Victor von Gegerfelt (1817-1915). In 1862, Gothenburg Natural History Museum was incorporated into the Gothenburg Museum.

== Selected works ==
- 1855 - Om Svenska landt- och söttvattens mollusker, med särskilt afseende på de arter och former, som förkomma i grannskapet af Christianstad (C) och Göteborg (G)
- 1866 - Om den i Bohuslän strandade hvalen
- 1866 - Några blad om hvaldjur i allmänhet och Balænoptera Carolinæ i synnerhet
- 1871 - Hvaldjur i Sveriges museer, år 1869
- 1877 - Göteborg och Bohusläns fauna, Ryggradsdjvren

== Other sources ==
- Göteborgs etnografiska museum (Göteborg: Årstryck. 1983)
- Grönberg, Cecilia; Magnusson, Jonas Leviatan från Göteborg (Göteborg: Glänta. 2002 ) ISBN 9197363650
