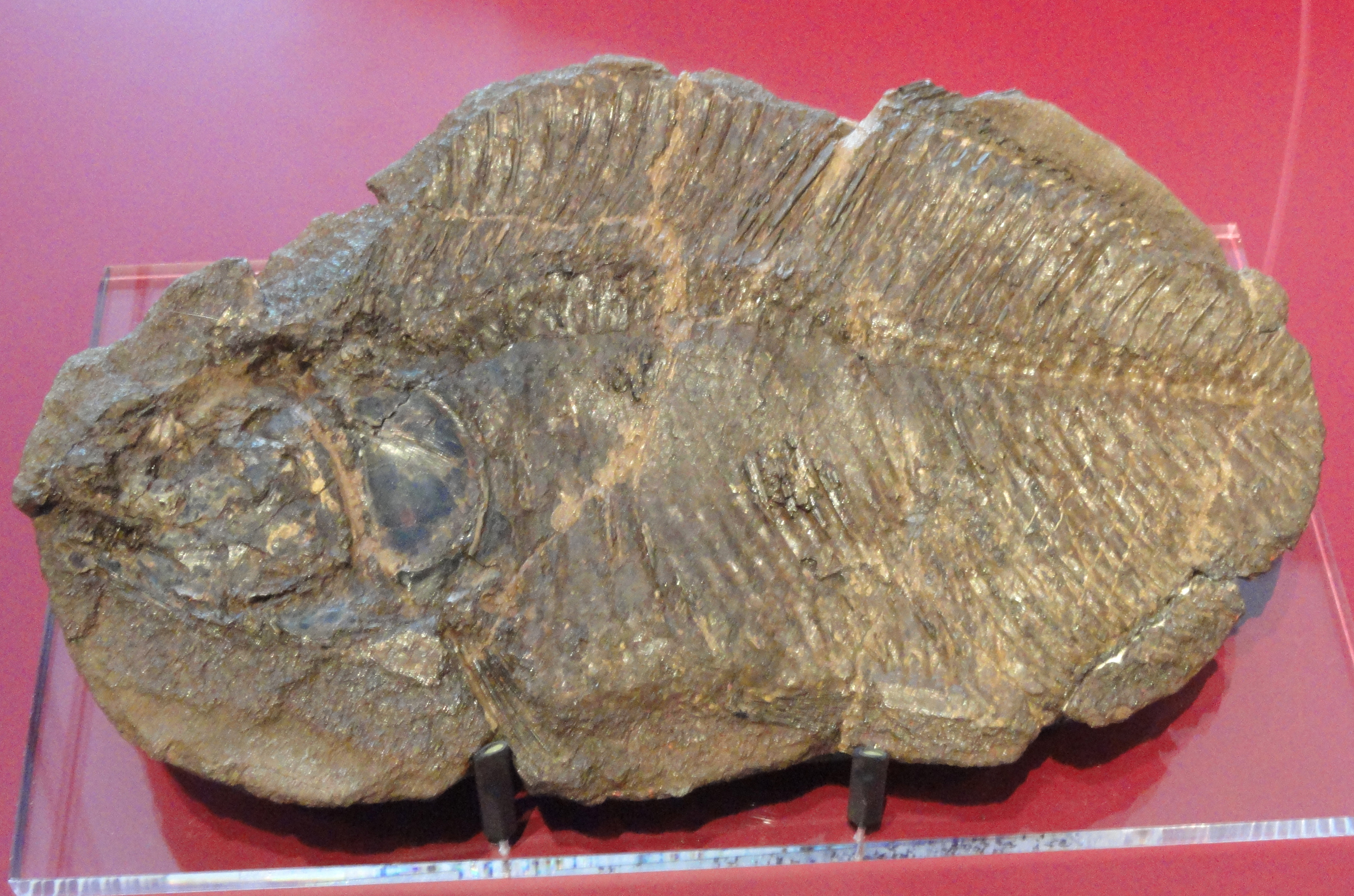
- C. alberticus fossil from Dinosaur Provincial Park, Royal Ontario Museum

Scientific classification
- Kingdom: Animalia
- Phylum: Chordata
- Class: Actinopterygii
- Order: Osteoglossiformes
- Family: Osteoglossidae
- Subfamily: Osteoglossinae
- Genus: †Cretophareodus; Li, 1996

Type species
- Cretophareodus alberticus Li, 1996

= Cretophareodus =

Cretophareodus Temporal range: Late Cretaceous, Late Campanian

Extinct genus of bony fishes

Cretophareodus is an extinct genus of bonytongue from the Campanian of the Dinosaur Park Formation in Alberta. It is known from a nearly complete skeleton lacking only the tail, named in 1996 by Li Guo-qing with the type species C. alberticus. It was moderately-sized, being around 30 cm (12 in) long, and is closely related to the Eocene genera Phareodus and Brychaetus. Additional isolated bones from the Dinosaur Park Formation are also referrable to Cretophareodus.

It is the oldest known crown group osteoglossoid, a group represented today by arowanas and arapaimas.
