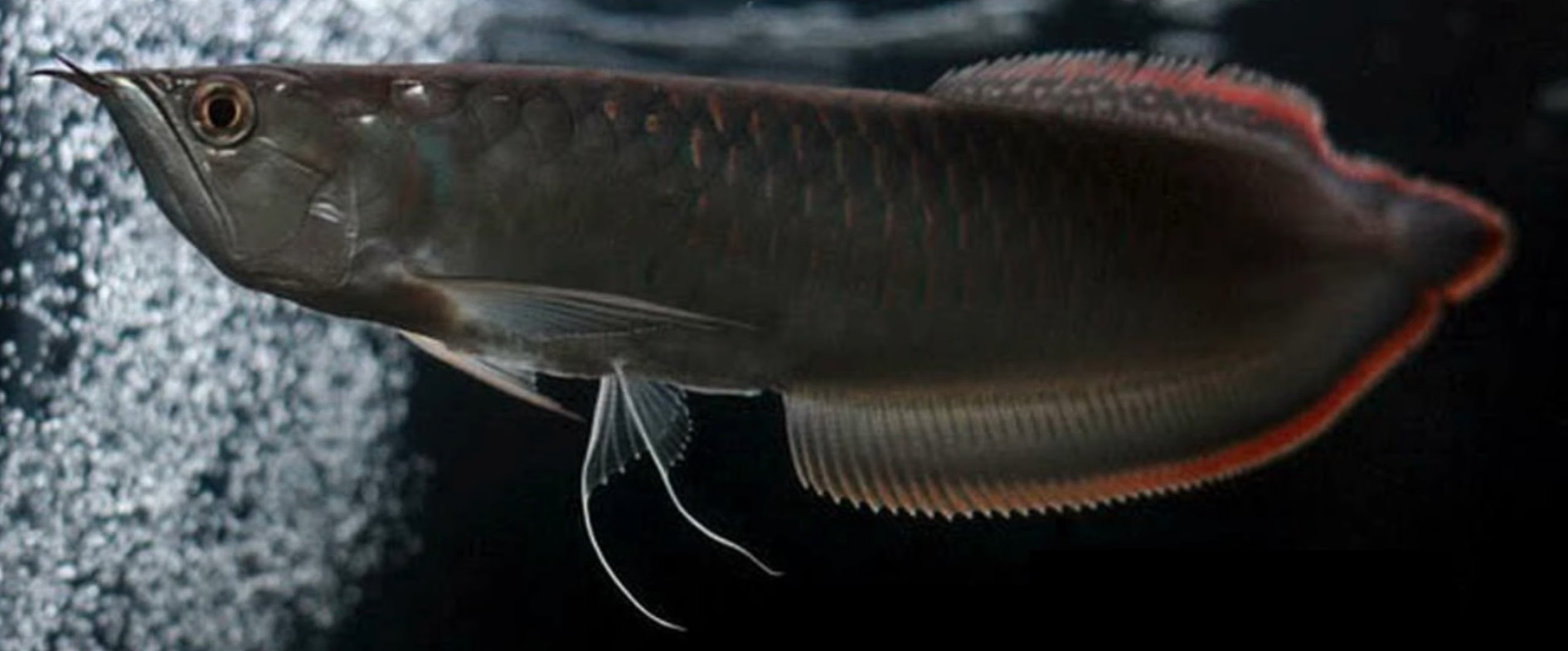

Conservation status
- Least Concern (IUCN 3.1)

Scientific classification
- Kingdom: Animalia
- Phylum: Chordata
- Class: Actinopterygii
- Order: Osteoglossiformes
- Family: Osteoglossidae
- Genus: Osteoglossum
- Species: O. ferreirai

Binomial name
- Osteoglossum ferreirai Kanazawa, 1966
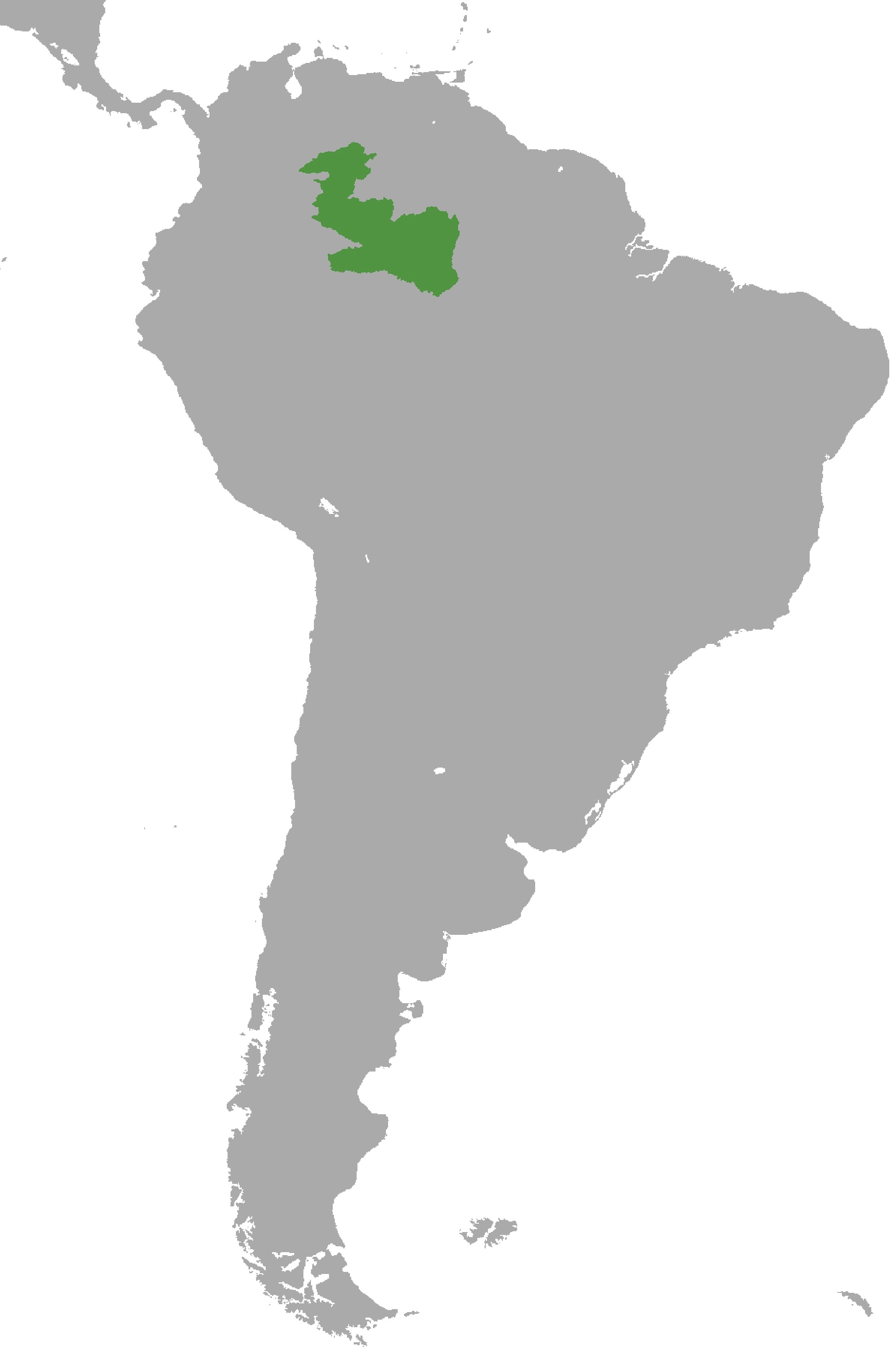

= Black arowana =

Species of fish

The black arowana (Osteoglossum ferreirai) is a South American freshwater bony fish of the family Osteoglossidae. Black arowanas are sometimes kept in aquariums, but they are predatory and require a very large tank. It is generally common, but large numbers are caught as food and for the aquarium fish trade.

== Etymology ==
The specific name ferreirai is named in honour of Alexandre Rodrigues Ferreira, the Portuguese-Brazilian naturalist who first reported this species.

== Range and habitat ==
The black arowana is native to tropical South America where restricted to the Rio Negro basin, including the Branco River. Black arowanas were discovered in the 1970s in the Orinoco basins, but whether this is a natural population or the result of introductions by humans is disputed.

It is essentially a sedentary (non-migratory) species of blackwater habitats. During the dry season it mostly inhabits backwaters, marginal lagoons and small tributaries, but it is often seen in flooded forests during the high water season.

== Description ==
The black arowana has an elongated body and a tapered tail. Their maximum total length is typically considered to be 0.9 m (3.0 ft), but there are reports of individuals up to 1.2 m (3.9 ft). The juveniles are black with yellow markings down the length of the body, head and the tail. Once it reaches about 15 cm (0.5 ft), the markings disappear and the fish will develop a dark iridescent steel grey to blue coloration, hence its common name. Additionally, there are yellow and red outlining or the dorsal, caudal and tail fins. In contrast to the juveniles, adults are very similar to the silver arowana (O. bicirrhosum), but the two species can be separated by meristics.

Some Asian aquarists occasionally refer to arowana as dragonfish due to their unique appearance and believe they bring good luck.

== Behavior ==
South American arowanas are sometimes called water monkey or the monkey fish, because they can jump out of the water to capture their prey. They usually swim near the water surface looking for food. Although it has been known to eat larger prey like small bats and small monkeys, their main diets consist of shrimps, insects, smaller fishes and other animals that float on the water surface, on which its draw-bridge-like mouth is exclusively adapted for feeding.

The females spawn during the high water season. The up to 210 eggs are mouthbrooded by the male and the young only fully released when about 7 cm (2.8 in) long.

== See also ==
- Asian arowana
