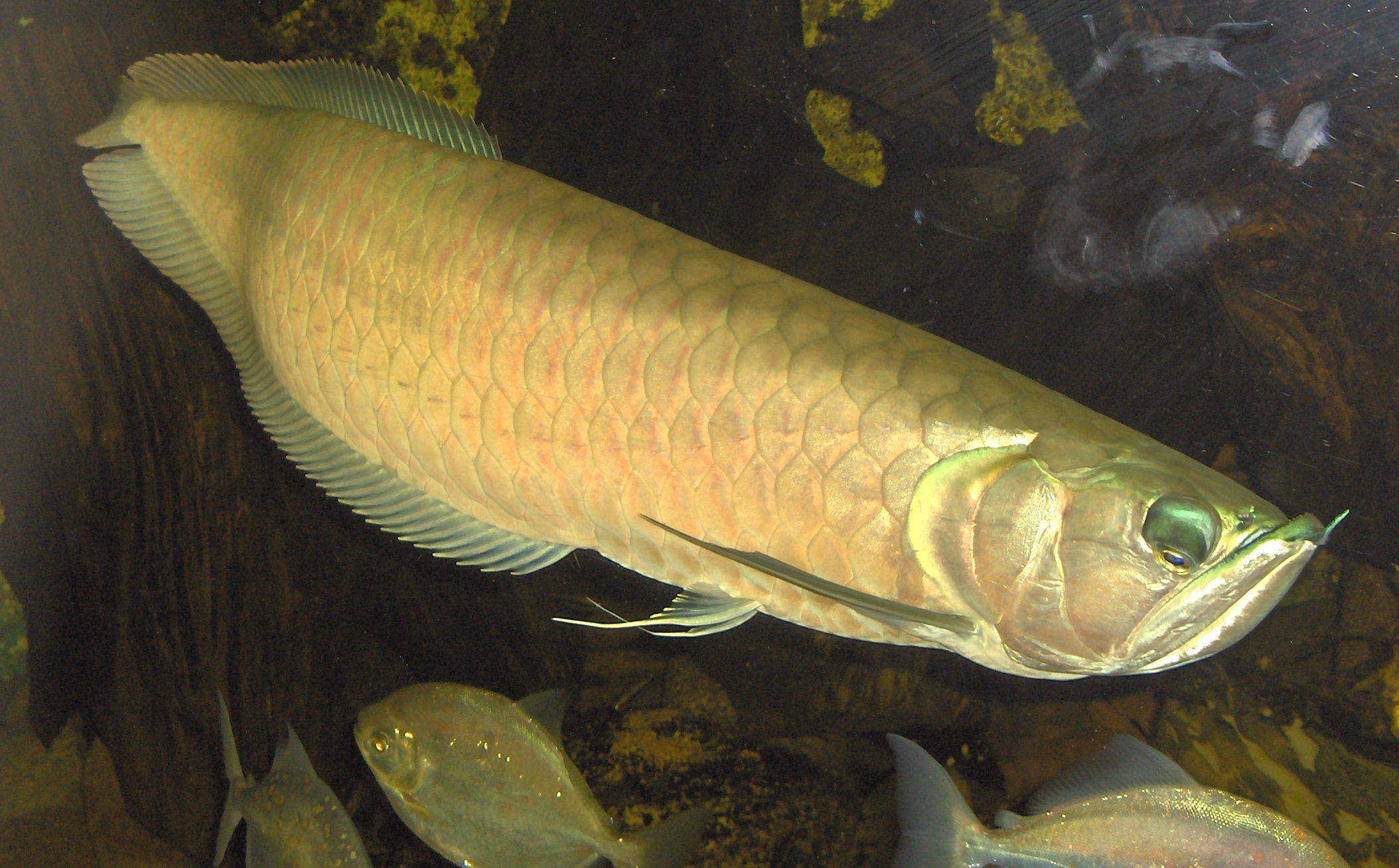

Scientific classification
- Kingdom: Animalia
- Phylum: Chordata
- Class: Actinopterygii
- Order: Osteoglossiformes
- Suborder: Osteoglossoidei; Regan, 1909

Families
- Osteoglossidae (bonytongues) Pantodontidae (butterflyfish) †Singidididae (extinct)

= Osteoglossoidei =

Suborder of fishes

Osteoglossoidei are a suborder of the order Osteoglossiformes (Latin: "bony tongues") that contains the butterflyfish, the arowanas and bonytongues, as well as extinct families.
