= Taverneichthys =

Taverneichthys Temporal range: Lower Eocene ~56.0–48.1 Ma

Scientific classification
- Kingdom: Animalia
- Phylum: Chordata
- Class: Actinopterygii
- Division: Teleostei
- Order: Osteoglossiformes
- Family: Osteoglossidae
- Subfamily: †Phareodontinae
- Genus: †Taverneichthys; Kumar et al., 2005

Type species
- Taverneichthys bikanericus Kumar et al., 2005

Extinct genus of fishes

Taverneichthys is an extinct genus of ray-finned fish in the family Osteoglossidae from what is now India. The fish is only known from the upper Palana Formation which dates to the lower Eocene. It is known from a skull preserving all parts except for the opercular region. Multiple publications place it within the subfamily Phareodontinae, a group of deep-bodied osteoglossids with comparisons being made between the genus and taxa like Phareodus. Based on its long teeth and wide gape, it has been suggested that the fish would have most likely had a diet largely made up of smaller fish. There is only one species assigned to the genus: T. bikanericus.

== History and classification ==
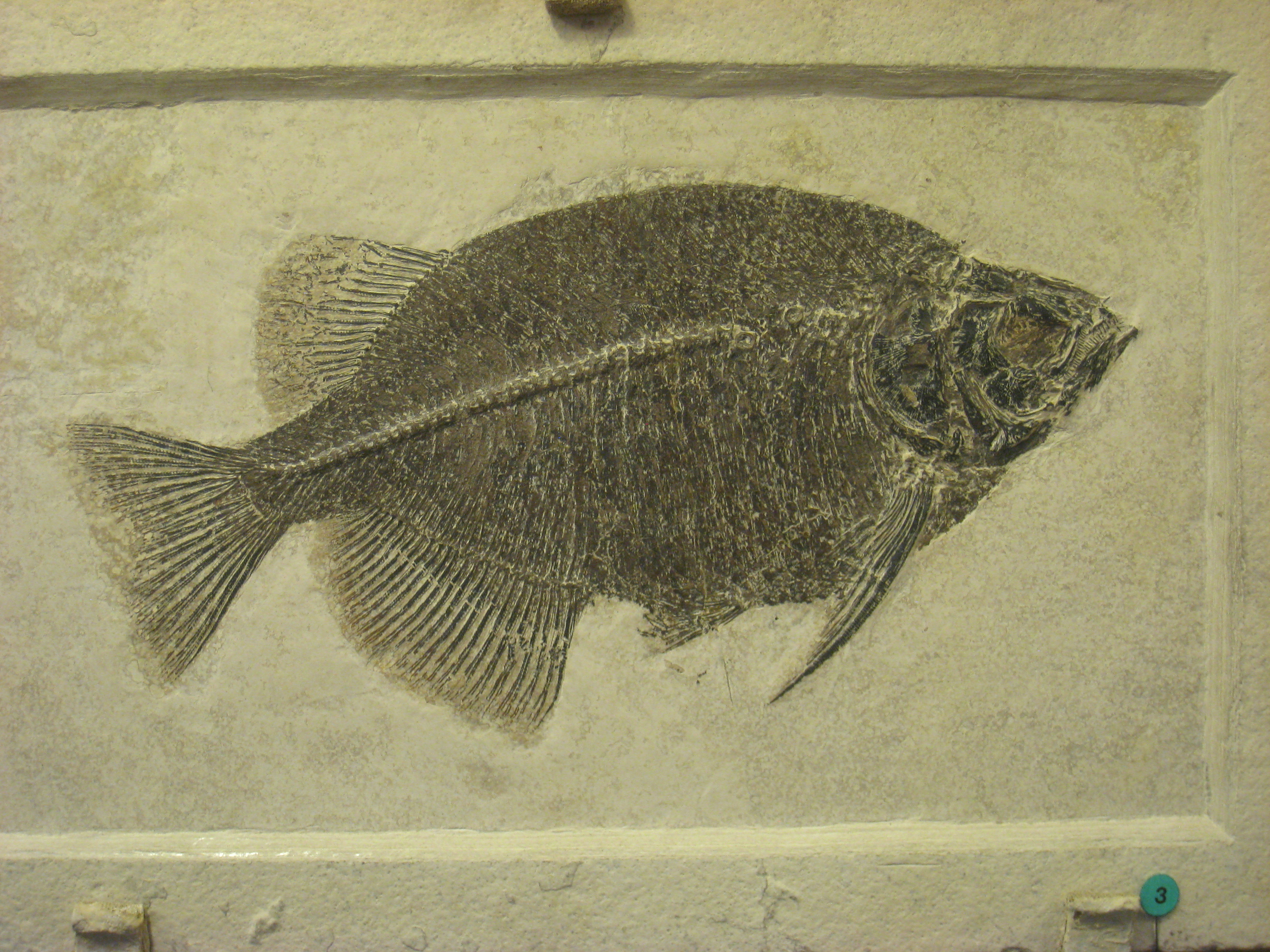
A specimen of Phareodus, a genus that Taverneichthys has been compared and is closely related to.

The first time that the material that would later be assigned to Taverneichthys appeared in the literature was in a 1999 publication by B. S. Paliwal in the journal Current Science. The specimen (JNVU / GEOL / PAL 502) was the first fish skull found in lower Eocene strata of the Palana Formation with the specimen being found in a dug-well in the village of Hadla-Bhatiyan, 45 kilometres (28 mi) southwest of Bikaner. This original, less detailed description of the material differed from the later description in a number of ways including the identification of the infraorbitals as the opercular series. The fish was suggested to either be a silurid or osteoglossid in this publication. A more in-depth description of the material was later published by Kishor Kumar, Rajendra S. Rana, and B. S. Paliwal in 2005, being published in Palaeontology. This paper agreed with the osteoglossid indentification suggested in the previous paper, making it the first known osteoglossid known non-fragmentary material in the Indian subcontinent. In 2009, a paper by Louis Taverne, Kishor Kumar, and Rajendra S. Rana was published as a compliment to the 2005 paper which described parts of the anatomy that the original description either lacked or didn't go into detail with.

The name Taverneichthys derives from Louis Taverne, a paleontologist who has done a large amount of work on Osteoglossiformes, along with the Greek word for fish "ichthys". The specific name bikanericus, on the other hand refers to Bikaner, the city where the fossil was found.

=== Classification ===
The placement of Taverneichthys would originally be within the subfamily Osteoglossinae though comparisons would be made to taxa such as to fish such as Phareodus and Brychaetus. Since then, a number of other publications has referred to the genus as a member of Phareodontinae.

== Description ==
The most well known features of Taverneichthys are found in the three-dimensionally preserved skull, though this specimen lacks a majority of the opercular region along with the back of the mandible. Even with it being incomplete, the specimen measures 110 millimetres (4.3 in) with the estimates placing the entire skull length at 160 millimetres (6.3 in). Based on comparisons with Phareodus, a fish suggested to be closely related to Taverneichthys, authors suggest that the fish could have had a total length ranging between 700–900 millimetres (28–35 in). Also like Phareodus, features of the skull such as the head shape of has been suggested to indicate that Taverneichthys was a deep-bodied fish.

Though the orbital region is not well preserved, the orbit was most likely large based on the positions of the third and forth infraorbitals. Both of these bones are about the same size with the main difference being that the third is shallower than the forth. In contrast to the poor preservation of the orbital region, the skull roof is much more complete. One of the most notable features of the fish is that the anterior portion of the frontal bones along with the frontals and dermethmoid bones of the fish are separated by the nasals. The nasals are large and smooth bones that are semicircular in shape, only being in contact with one another towards the midpoint. Though the nasals separate the frontals and the dermethmiods, the frontals span far past were the make initial contact with the nasals. This is the case due to the frontals branching, the second branch being in contact with the outer edge nasals and almost reaching the anterior ends of the nasals. Though a small bone when compared to others like the frontals and nasals, the dermethmoids are much larger than in other osteoglossids, measuring 15% of the neurocranium length. Also unlike other osteoglossids and other fish in Osteoglossomorpha as a whole, the dermethmiods of Taverneichthys are paired rather than just made up of a fused structure.

The jaws of Taverneichthys make up a large amount of the skull length with the lower jaw having an estimated length of 70 millimetres (2.8 in). The preserved portion of the upper jaw is made up of the premaxilla and maxilla with there being no evidence of a supramaxilla unlike closely related genera like Brychaetus. The premaxilla is different from other members of Osteoglossidae, having an outline compared to a shoe. The maxilla on the other hand is a much larger, more slender bone that ranges from the premaxilla to the angular bone of the mandible. Behind the orbits, Taverneichthys possesses a cleft, unlike any other members of its family. The jaw as a whole is moderately deep with a maximum depth of 25 millimetres (0.98 in), with it becoming more shallow anteriorly. Its surface is generally smooth though it does possess a few grooves that meet towards the front on the jaw. The teeth differ throughout the jaws with the smaller teeth only being present on the maxilla, though all teeth in the dentition are conical. The larger teeth on the premaxilla and dentary are slightly compressed, especially towards the base of the tooth, and hollow. Though the exact number of teeth is unknown, it has been suggested that the lower dentition would have been made up of 25-30 teeth. The mesethmoid endoskeleton is preserved at the snout, the base of it is made up of the supraethmoid which is both sutured to the hypoethmoid along with three other small plate-like bones. These sutured bones lay on top of the paired ethmopalatines anteriorly where they then sit on top of a toothed vomer.

== Paleoecology ==
Based on the wide gape of the jaw and large conical teeth of Taverneichthys, the fish was most likely predatory. When compared to the teeth of other osteoglossids, the large teeth seen in Taverneichthys are also usually seen in fish that mainly feed on smaller fish. Based on plant remains found at the formation, it is most likely that the fish lived freshwater bodies of water within a coastal, tropical forest with a large amount of seasonality.
