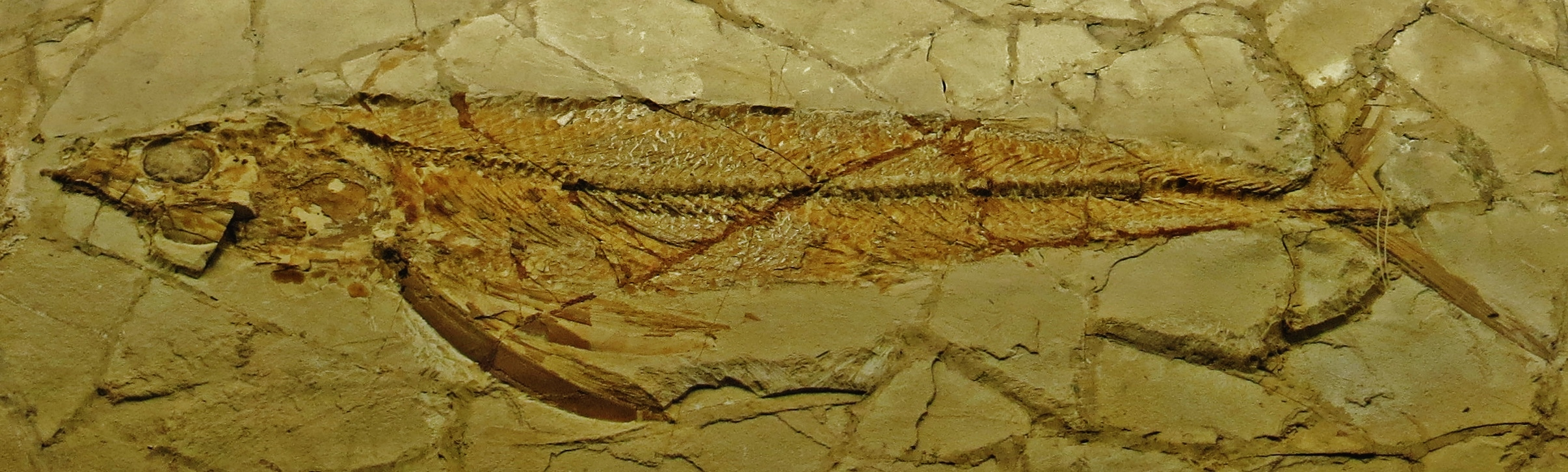
- Specimen from Monte Bolca

Scientific classification
- Kingdom: Animalia
- Phylum: Chordata
- Class: Actinopterygii
- Order: †Crossognathiformes
- Family: †Pachyrhizodontidae
- Genus: †Platinx; Agassiz, 1835
- Species: †P. macropterus

Binomial name
- †Platinx macropterus (de Blainville, 1818)

Synonyms
- Platinx cognitus Daniltshenko, 1968; Platinx elongatus Agassiz, 1835; Platinx intermedius Eastman, 1905

= Platinx =

Platinx Temporal range: Early to Middle Eocene

Extinct genus of ray-finned fishes

Platinx is an extinct genus of marine ray-finned fish that inhabited the northern Tethys Ocean during the early to middle Eocene. It was the last surviving member of the ancient order Crossognathiformes, which was a dominant and successful group throughout the preceding Mesozoic era.

It contains a single species, P. macropterus, whose remains are primarily known from the late Ypresian-aged rocks of Monte Bolca, Italy. However, specimens have also been recovered from the earliest-Ypresian Danata Formation of Turkmenistan (sometimes placed in their own distinct species, P. cognitus Daniltshenko, 1968, although these do not appear to be distinct enough from P. macropterus), as well as incomplete remains from the middle Eocene of Syria.

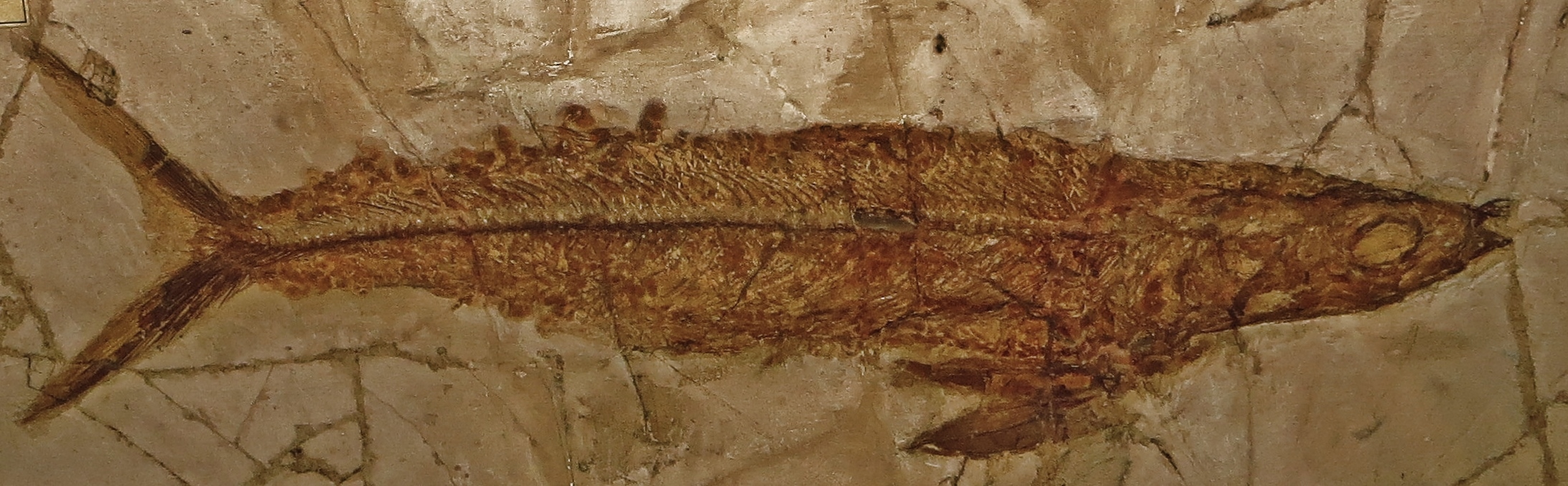
Fossil specimen

The extinct bonytongues Monopteros and Thrissopterus, which co-occur with Platinx in Monte Bolca, were for a time briefly reclassified as a species of Platinx (P. gigas), although they are now known to be distinct.
