= Chanopsis =

Chanopsis Temporal range: Aptian to Albian

Scientific classification
- Kingdom: Animalia
- Phylum: Chordata
- Class: Actinopterygii
- Division: Teleostei
- Order: Osteoglossiformes
- Family: Osteoglossidae (?)
- Genus: †Chanopsis; Casier, 1961
- Species: †C. lombardi

Binomial name
- †Chanopsis lombardi Casier, 1961

Extinct genus of fishes

Chanopsis is an extinct genus of prehistoric freshwater bonytongue relative that lived from the late Aptian to the Albian stage of the Early Cretaceous epoch. It contains a single species, C. lombardi from the Democratic Republic of the Congo.

Chanopsis was a large fish known from both the late Aptian/early Albian Loia Formation and the overlying Albian Bokungu Formation. Initially described as a chanid (hence the genus name), later studies found it to be a osteoglossiform, most likely a stem-bonytongue. The exact placement of Chanopsis within the osteoglossoids remains uncertain as it lacks some of the key traits of the group, but as one of the earliest potential members of the osteoglossoid crown group, it would be crucial to understanding divergence estimates of the order.

== See also ==
- Prehistoric fish
- List of prehistoric bony fish
