= Arowana & Co. =

Arowana
- Industry: Investment
- Founded: 2007
- Founder: Kevin Chin
- Website: https://arowanaco.com/

Arowana & Co is a corporation with operating enterprises in education, renewable solar energy, power services, asset management and venture capital, as well as other investments.

The company has offices in London, Dubai, Singapore, Manila, Brisbane and Sydney.

Arowana & Co. takes its name from the Arowana fish.

== History ==
Established in 2007, Arowana is a global enterprise that directly owns and operates listed and unlisted enterprises, as well as having investments in specific sectors around the world.

== B Corp certification ==
Arowana is a certified B Corporation, having achieved full accreditation from the global non-profit organisation B Lab in April 2018. It recertified in 2022, with an upgraded score.

== Companies ==
The group currently comprises the following companies:

=== VivoPower International PLC ===
VivoPower International PLC
- Traded as: Nasdaq: VVPR; Russell Microcap Index component
- ISIN: GB00BD3VDH82

Nasdaq listed VivoPower International PLC. VivoPower is a company that offers battery technology, electric vehicle, solar, and critical power services. Founded by Arowana in August 2014, the company is based in the UK but maintains offices in Australia, Canada, the Netherlands, the Philippines, and the US. In October 2021, VivoPower announced the establishment of its office in Dubai, UAE.

=== Tembo e-LV ===
Tembo is a specialist battery-electric and off-road vehicle company focussed on designing and building ruggedised light electric vehicles for customers across the globe in the mining, infrastructure, utilities, government services (including defence, police, and healthcare), and humanitarian aid sectors.

=== Edventure Group ===
Established by Arowana in 2017, EdventureCo is a vocational and professional education and training group with operations across Australia, New Zealand, and Southeast Asia. It is a provider of digital, soft and future skills training.

=== AWN Holdings Limited ===
AWN Holdings (“AWN”) was established through a reverse merger on the Australian Stock Exchange (ASX) in April 2013, in order to open up access for investors to some of Arowana's privately held operating companies. In November 2021, AWN was voluntarily delisted from the ASX, following approval by shareholders.
