= Opsithrissops =

Opsithrissops Temporal range: Thanetian

Scientific classification
- Kingdom: Animalia
- Phylum: Chordata
- Class: Actinopterygii
- Division: Teleostei
- Order: Osteoglossiformes
- Family: Osteoglossidae
- Genus: †Opsithrissops; Daniltshenko, 1968

Type species
- Opsithrissops osseus Danilchenko, 1968

Extinct genus of fishes

Opsithrissops is an extinct genus of prehistoric bony fish that lived during the Thanetian stage of the Paleocene epoch. It is a 120 centimetres (3.9 ft) fish in the family Osteoglossiformes which includes other bony-tongues such as the extant species of arowana and arapaima.

== See also ==
- Prehistoric fish
- List of prehistoric bony fish
