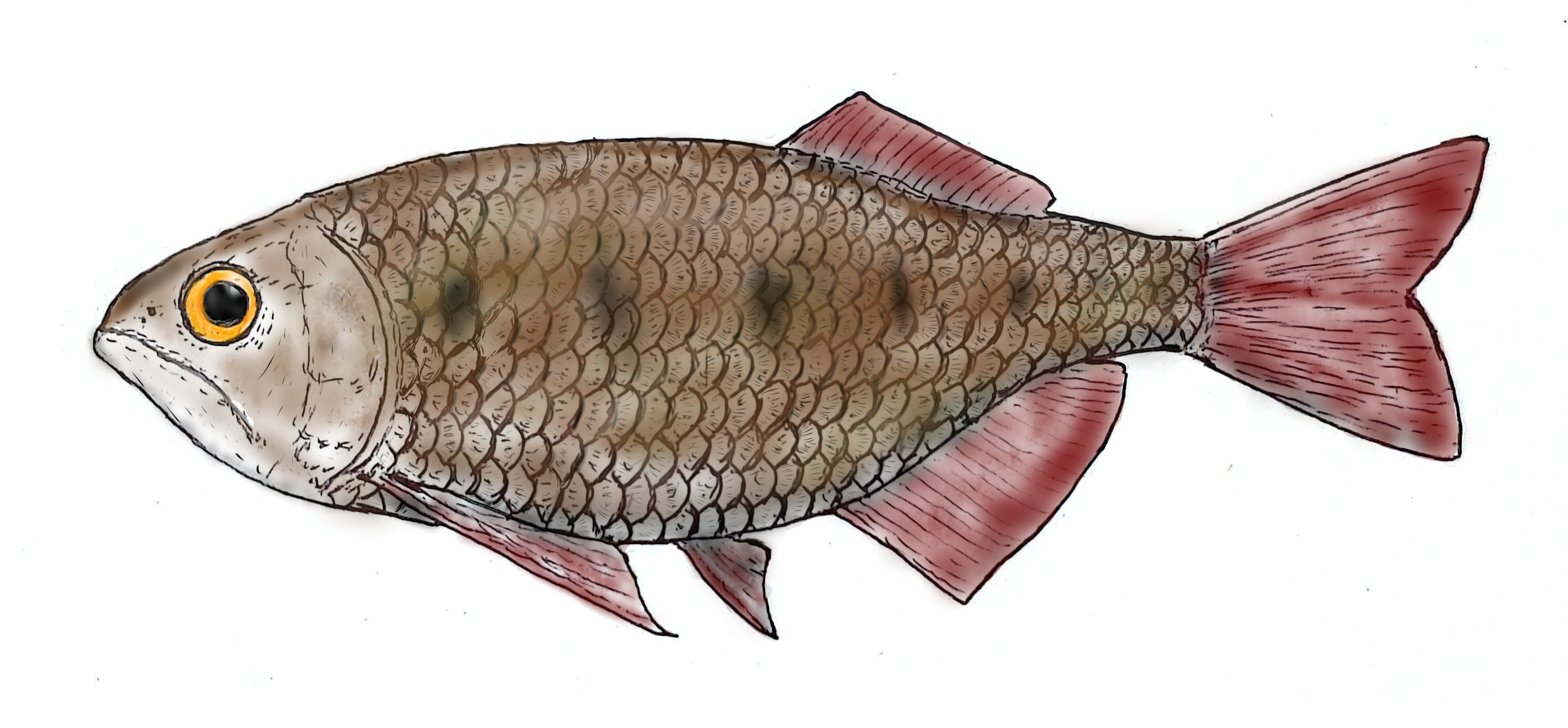

Scientific classification
- Kingdom: Animalia
- Phylum: Chordata
- Class: Actinopterygii
- Order: Osteoglossiformes
- Family: Osteoglossidae
- Subfamily: †Phareodontinae
- Genus: †Musperia; Sanders, 1934
- Species: †M. radiata

Binomial name
- †Musperia radiata (Heer, 1874)

= Musperia =

Musperia Temporal range: ?early-mid Eocene

Genus of fishes

Musperia is a genus of fossil bonytongue fish found in the Sangkarewang Formation, Sumatra, Indonesia. Reaching almost 60 cm in length, it lived in an Early Eocene-aged freshwater environment. It had a deep body profile similar to related taxa such as Phareodus.

Little is known about this genus, as most of the original specimens were destroyed during World War II, with only two very small specimens (approx. 10 cm) left that were discovered later. One among these two specimens still retains its head, albeit severely crushed and displaced.
