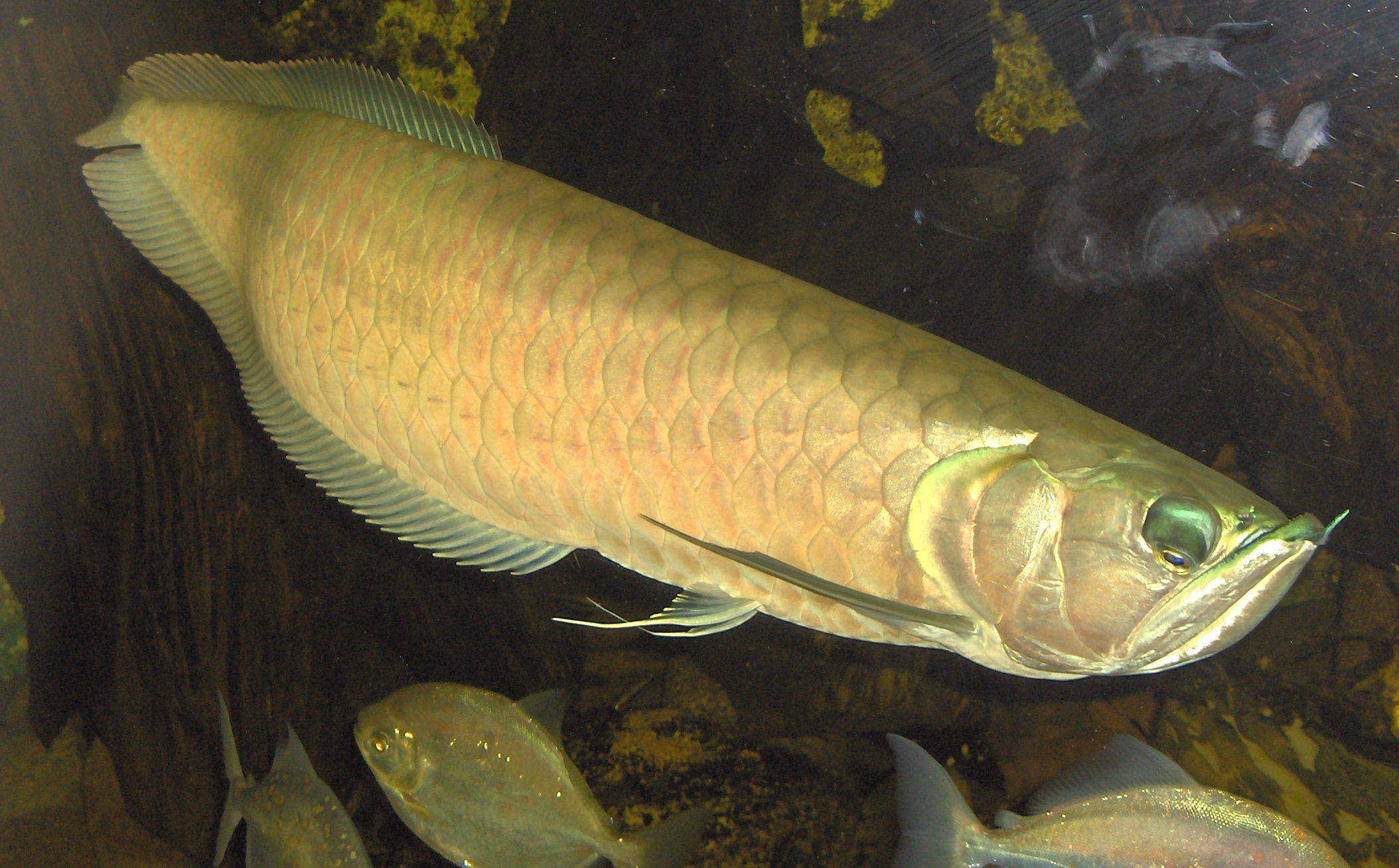

Conservation status
- Least Concern (IUCN 3.1)

Scientific classification
- Kingdom: Animalia
- Phylum: Chordata
- Class: Actinopterygii
- Order: Osteoglossiformes
- Family: Osteoglossidae
- Genus: Osteoglossum
- Species: O. bicirrhosum

Binomial name
- Osteoglossum bicirrhosum Cuvier (ex Vandelli), 1829
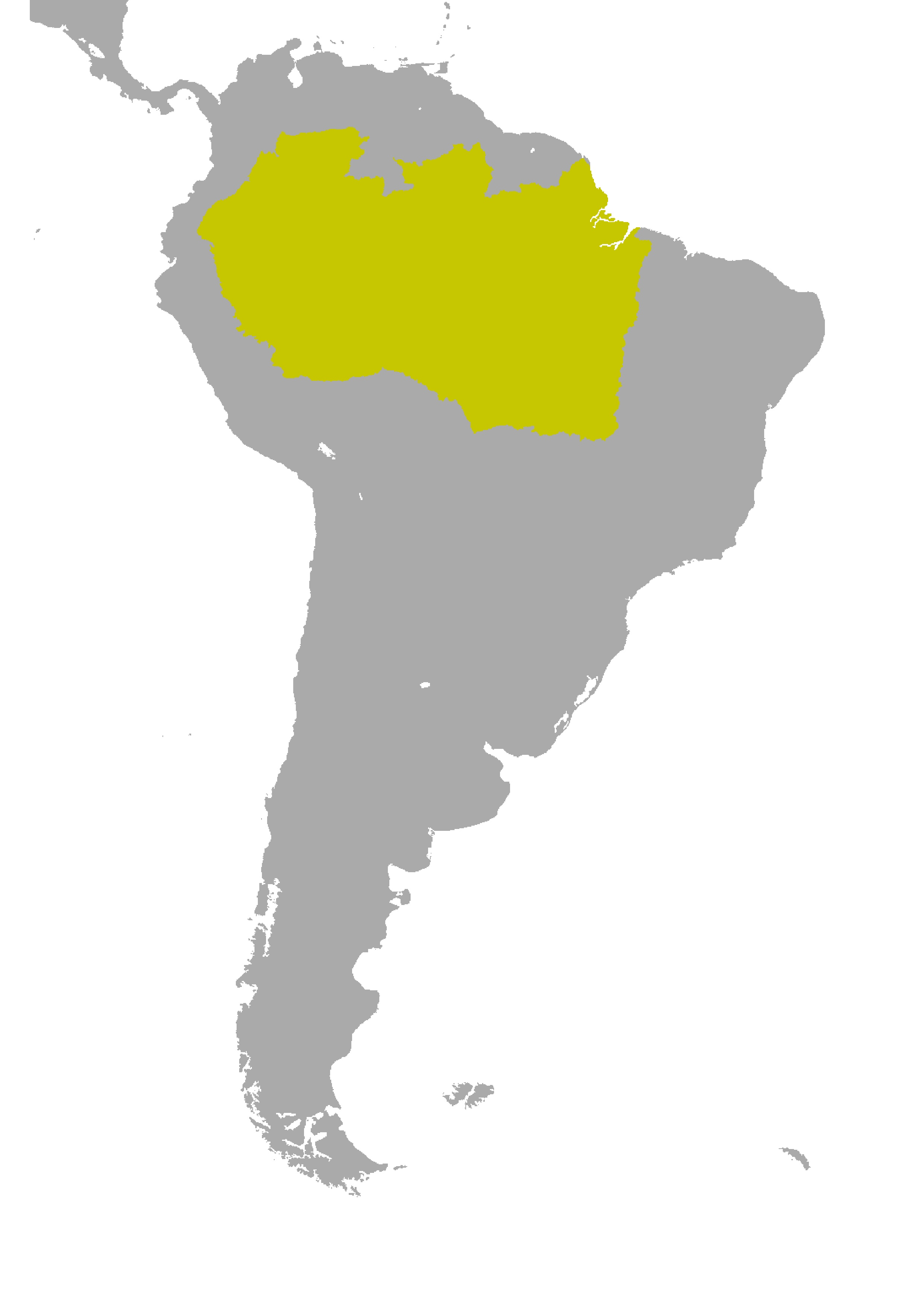

= Silver arowana =

Species of fish

The silver arowana (Osteoglossum bicirrhosum) is a South American freshwater bony fish of the family Osteoglossidae. Silver arowanas are sometimes kept in aquariums, but they are predatory and require a very large tank.

The generic name Osteoglossum means "bone-tongued" and the specific name bicirrhosum means "two barbels" (from the Greek language).

== Range and habitat ==
This South American species is native to the Amazon, Essequibo and Oyapock basins. It is absent from the Rio Negro basin, except the Branco River, which is inhabited by both silver and black arowanas.

The silver arowana occurs in both black- and whitewater habitats, including flooded forests.

== Description ==
This fish has relatively large scales, a long body, and a tapered tail, with the dorsal and anal fins extending all the way to the small caudal fin, with which they are nearly fused. Its maximum total length is typically considered to be 0.9 m (3.0 ft), but there are reports of individuals up to 1.2 m (3.9 ft). Unlike the black arowana, the silver arowana has the same coloring throughout its lifespan. Adults of the two species are very similar, but can be separated by meristics.

Arowanas are sometimes called 'dragon fish' by aquarists because their shiny, armor-like scales and double barbels are reminiscent of descriptions of dragons in East Asian folklore.

== Behavior ==
The species is also called 'water monkey' because of its ability to jump out of the water and capture its prey. It usually swims near the water surface waiting for potential prey. Although specimens have been found with the remains of birds, bats, mice, and snakes in their stomachs, its main diet consists of snails, crustaceans (such as crabs), insects (such as beetles), spiders, smaller fish, and other animals that float on the water surface, for which purpose its drawbridge-like mouth is adapted.

== Conservation status ==
The silver arowana is not currently listed on any CITES appendix and is listed as Least Concern on the IUCN Red List. It is one of the most popular ornamental fish from South America, however, and therefore its conservation status merits attention. Other threats include droughts and deforestation, siltation and drainage of land for human use.

As reported by Environment News Service in August 2005, shared use of the silver arowana population was a cause for a dispute between Brazilian and Colombian authorities. Juvenile silver arowanas are caught in Colombia for sale as aquarium fish, while the people of Brazilian Amazonia catch adult fish for food. A sharp drop in the number of arowanas had caused Brazilian authorities to prohibit fishing of them between September 1 and November 15; the Colombians would prohibit capturing them between November 1 and March 15.

The silver arowana is often kept as a pet by experienced aquarists, being considered an accessible substitute for the Asian arowana, which is listed on CITES Appendix I and is therefore difficult and expensive to obtain legally.

== See also ==
- List of freshwater aquarium fish species
- Asian arowana
