= Ridewoodichthys =

Ridewoodichthys Temporal range: Early Selandian ~61.66–58.95 Ma

Scientific classification
- Kingdom: Animalia
- Phylum: Chordata
- Class: Actinopterygii
- Division: Teleostei
- Order: Osteoglossiformes
- Family: Osteoglossidae
- Subfamily: †Phareodontinae
- Genus: †Ridewoodichthys; Taverne, 2009

Type species
- Ridewoodichthys coheni Taverne, 2009

Synonyms
- Brychaetus caheni Taverne, 1969

Extinct genus of fishes

Ridewoodichthys is an extinct genus of ray-finned fish in the family Osteoglossidae from Angola. The fish is only known from Selandian deposits found near Cacongo. It is not known from much material with the most complete specimen being an incomplete caudal section that includes the lower lobe of the caudal fin. Other than that, only fragmentary skull elements are known with their main defining feature being the large, closely-spaced teeth found on the upper and lower jaws. Even with that being the case, the shape of the ribs on the tail suggest that it was most likely a deep-bodied fish. Ridewoodichthys, unlike its living relatives, was a marine fish. Though not much is known about its ecosystem, it is known to have lived alongside sharks such as Ginglymostoma and the dyrosaur Congosaurus. There is currently only one species in the genus: R. caheni.

== History and Classification ==
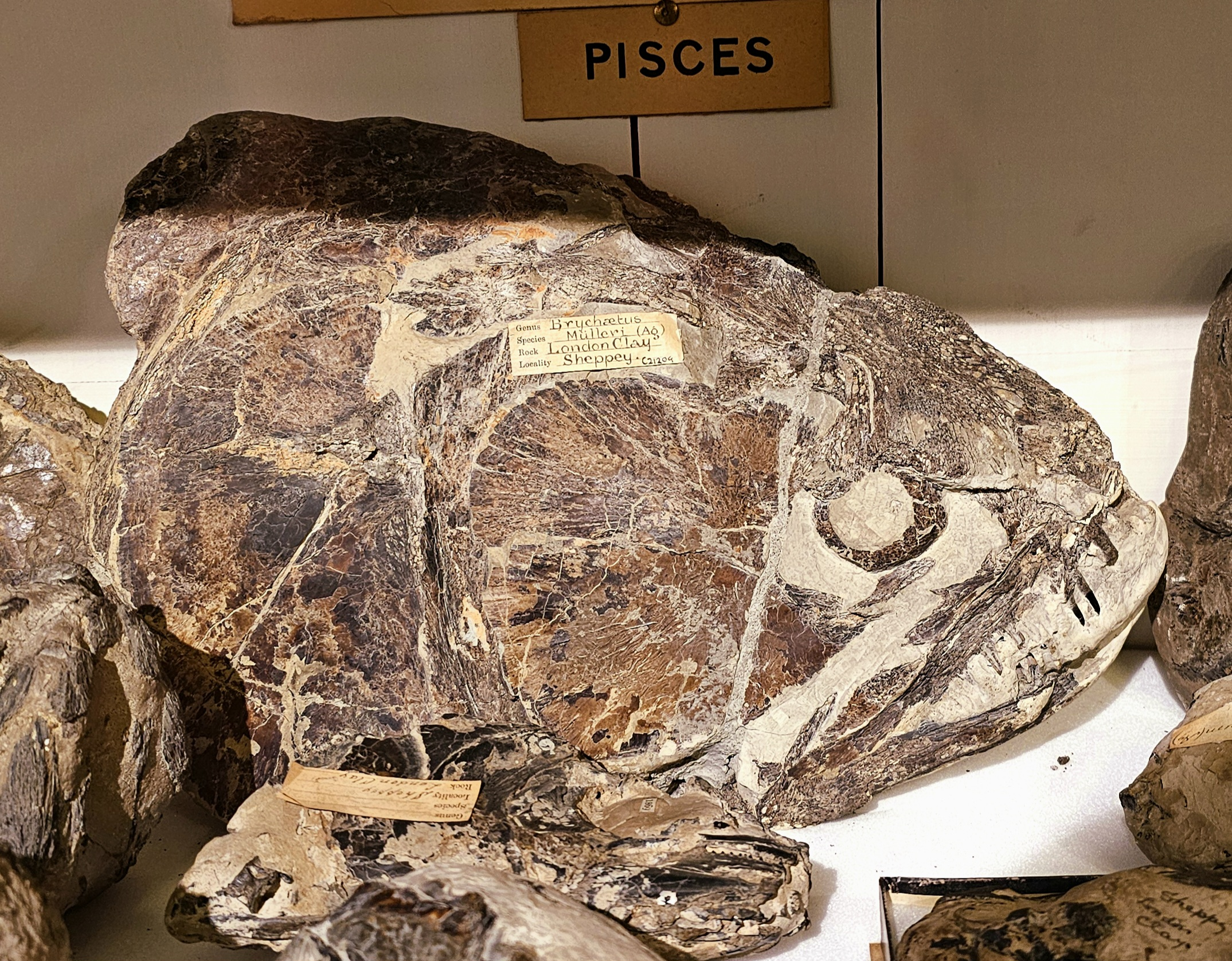
A specimen of Brychaetus, the genus that Ridewoodichthys was originally assigned to

The material that was eventually assigned to the genus Ridewoodichthys was first assigned to the genus Brychaetus by Dartevelle and Casier in their 1959 monograph that focused on fossil fish from the "Lower-Congo" and nearby countries. Though they were not assigned confidently into a species, they would make comparisons between the material to B. muelleri, describing it as B. aff. muelleri. This material was made up of fragmentary skull material found in sediments dating to the Selandian of Angola near the town of Cacongo. More material was then assigned to the taxon by Louis Taverne in 1969, with this material coming in the form of a caudal skeleton (MRAC RG 9183) housed at the Royal Museum for Central Africa in Tervuren, Belgium. The specimen was found in the same area as the original specimens with the author placing the material in its own species, Brychaetus cetheni, based on the differences in tooth shape between the material and other specimens assigned to Brychaetus muelleri.

The species would not be moved to its own genus until another paper was published by Taverne in 2009. The author stated the reasons for this change in assignment was not only due to differences in the caudal skeleton but also due to the fact that the only reason that it was kept in the genus originally was due to the fact that Brychaetus was once the only marine member Osteoglossidae known at the time. In 2016, another caudal skeleton housed at the would be assigned to the genus by Taverne. The specimen (MRAC RG 1275) was originally collected by J. Bequaert in 1913 only to be assigned to "Teleostei indéterminé" by Casier in 1960. The description of this newer specimen in a layer closer to the type material of the genus along with the more derived nature of the first caudal skeleton caused Taverne to suggest that the first caudal specimen was more likely from a different, younger unnamed taxon.

The name Ridewoodichthys derives from the zoologist Walter G. Ridewood, the first author to publish an in-depth description of the cranial osteology in all recent families in Osteoglossomorpha, along with the Greek word for fish "ichthys".

=== Classification ===
In the original description of Ridewoodichthys, Taverne placed the genus within Osteoglossidae due to the original caudal specimen assigned to the genus sharing features with other members of Osteoglossidae such as the fusion of hypural plate and second ural centrum, a common feature even within the order. Though the assignment of that specimen changed in the 2016 publication, Tavern would keep this placement of the genus with the assignment of the other caudal material based on similarities between the specimen and what is seen in genera such as Joffrichthys. However, more recent papers, such as the 2018 publication by Alison Murray and coauthors have argued against the Osteoglossidae assignment of Joffrichthys, suggesting that some of these features were more widespread than previously though and not conclusive evidence for an osteoglossid placement. Ridewoodichthys has also been suggested to be within Phareodontinae, a subfamily containing a number of marine osteoglossomorphs, though there has yet to be a formal phylogenetic analysis on the subfamily so the placement of the subfamily within Osteoglossidae is unknown.

== Description ==
Though a complete specimen of Ridewoodichthys has yet to be described, the material that is known does show that Ridewoodichthys was a large fish with the caudal specimen assigned to the genus measuring 275 millimetres (10.8 in).

=== Skull ===
The skull of Ridewoodichthys is poorly known with the only known material coming from the holotype (MRAC RG 9169), an incomplete premaxilla, along with the two paratypes which are represented by a fragmentary left dentary (MRAC RG 9170) and a single tooth (MRAC RG 9171). The preserved premaxilla lacks the top of the ascending process and back of the oral branch. The bone that is present is largely triangular with concave, rounded posterior edge. The similarly fragmentary dentary is deep though not much else can be told based on the incompleteness of the material. Teeth are preserved on both the premaxilla and dentary with three teeth being preserved on the former and twelve on the latter. There are an additional two on the premaxilla only being represented by the sockets. The teeth that are preserves are large and conical in shape with a majority of the tooth length being made up of the crown. They are closely spaced on but the upper and lower jaws.

=== Postcranium ===
The known postcranium skeleton of Ridewoodichthys is made up of an articulated series of the last seventeen caudal vertebrae, the lower lobe of the caudal fin, and fragmentary remains of the dorsal and anal fins. Based on the length of the neural spines and the orientation of the haemal spines suggest that Ridewoodichthys was a deep-bodied fish. The vertebrae before the ural centra have neural and haemal arches that are fused to the centra with this not being the case in the two located within the tail. Five hypurals are preserved, showing that the first and second were fused together at the proximal regions. Though the entire caudal fin is not preserved, what has been found shows it as an elongate fin with the lower lobe being made up of six fin rays with very short segments.

== Paleoenvironment ==
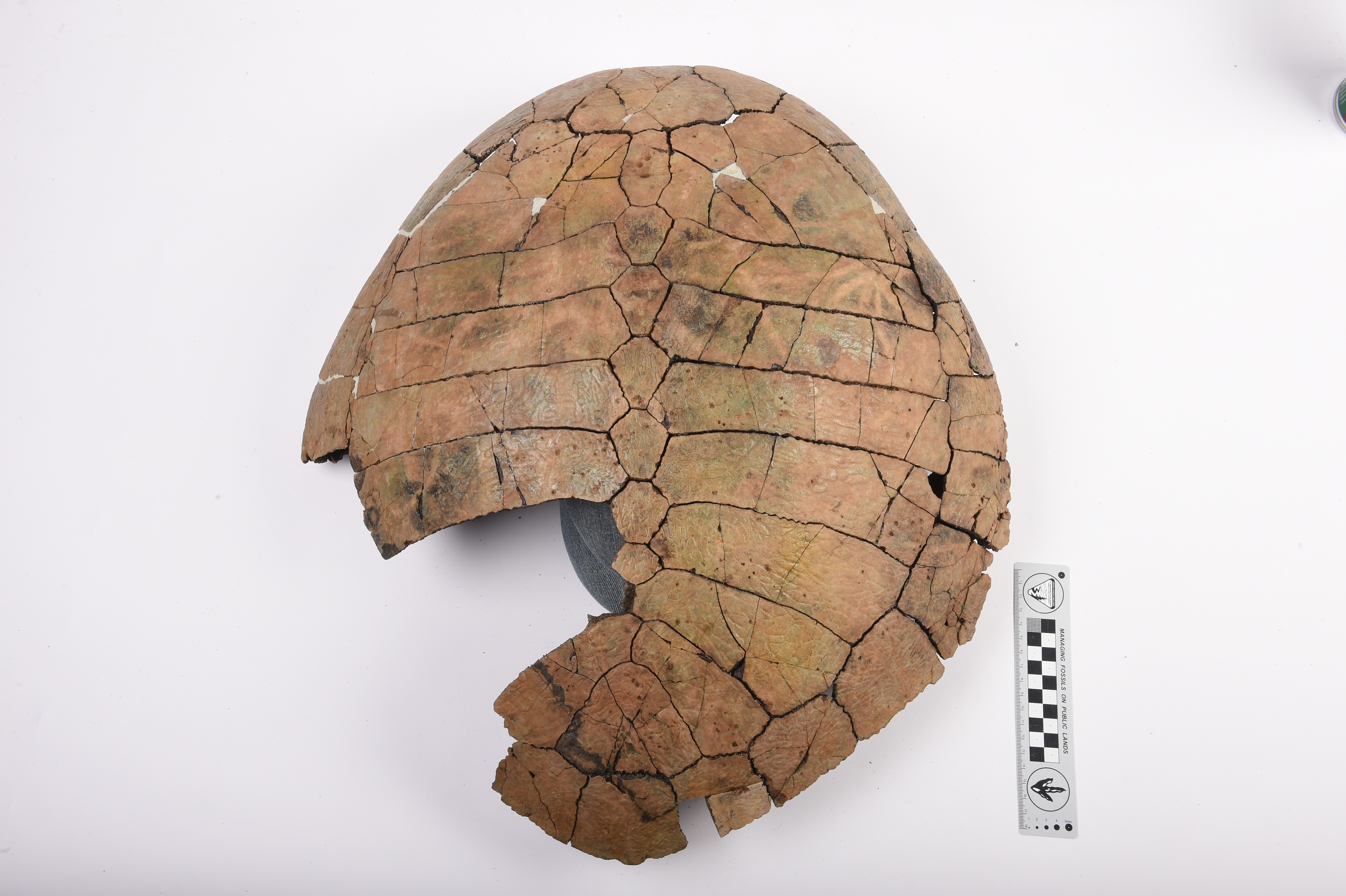
A specimen of Taphrosphys, one of the turtles found in similarly-aged deposits as Ridewoodichthys.

Unlike its modern relatives, Ridewoodichthys was a marine fish. Though the ecosystem of the region is poorly known, a few genera have been found in similarly-aged deposits in the area. This biota is largely made up of the rays Myliobatis dixoni and Eotorpedo hilgendorfi along with the shark Ginglymostoma subafricanum and the elophid fish Landanaelops gunnelli. The only tetrapods found in these deposits is the dyrosaur Congosaurus along with the turtles Taphrosphys and Cabindachelys. Something that is noted is that there was a decrease in faunal diversity during this time including a loss in fish and cephalopod taxa. A few of these fish such as G. subafricanum have been suggested to have survived a bit longer in Western Africa, with them going extinct after the Danian in other regions.
