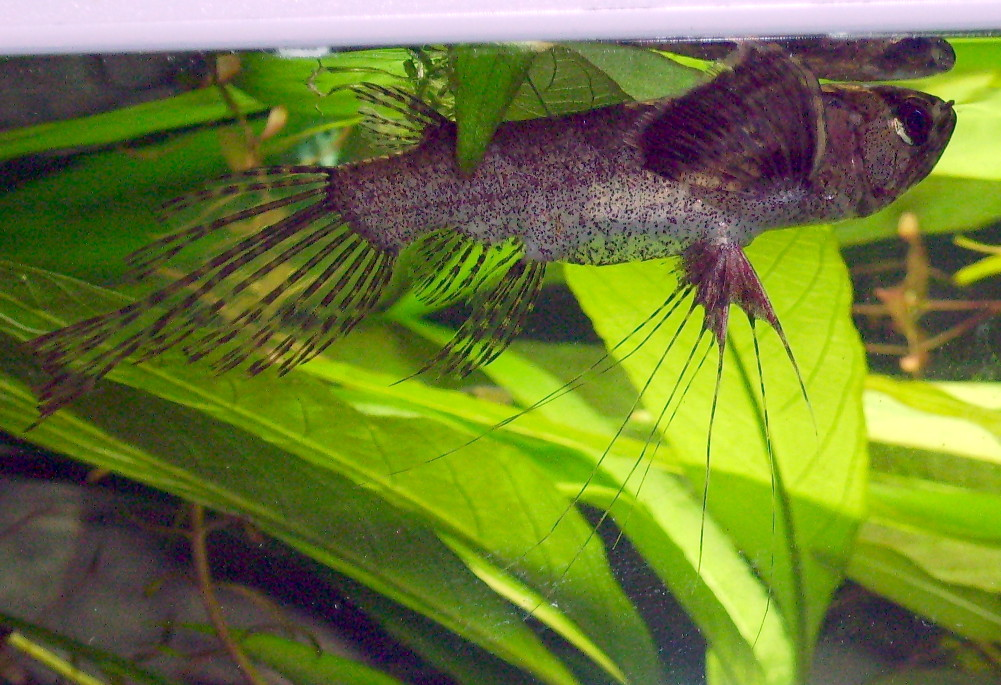

Conservation status
- Least Concern (IUCN 3.1)

Scientific classification
- Kingdom: Animalia
- Phylum: Chordata
- Class: Actinopterygii
- Order: Osteoglossiformes
- Family: Pantodontidae
- Genus: Pantodon; W. K. H. Peters, 1877
- Species: P. buchholzi

Binomial name
- Pantodon buchholzi W. K. H. Peters, 1877
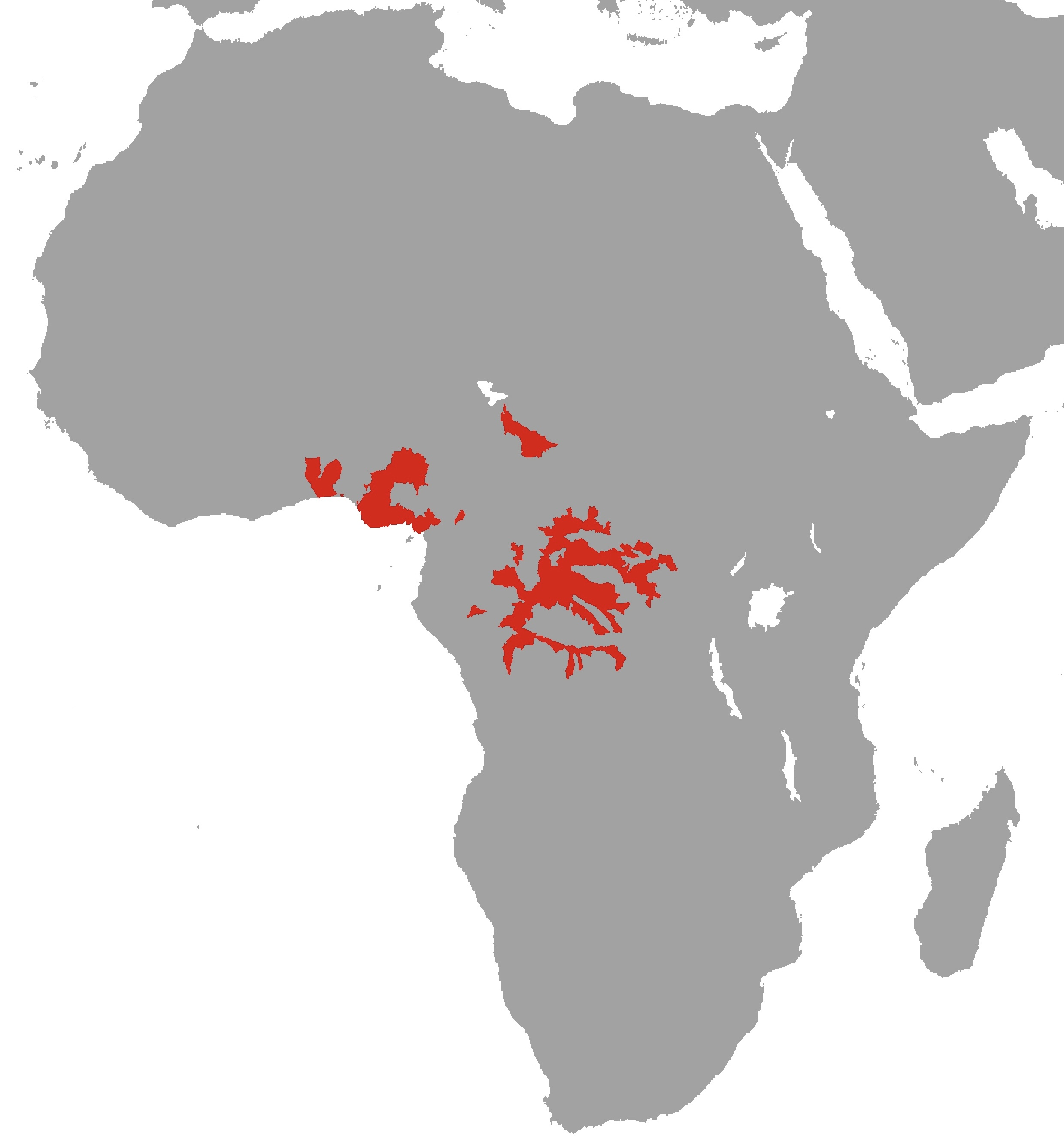

= Freshwater butterflyfish =

Species of fish

The freshwater butterflyfish or African butterflyfish (Pantodon buchholzi) is a species of osteoglossiform fish native to freshwater habitats in the Niger and Congo basins of Western and Central Africa. It is the only extant species in the family Pantodontidae. Despite the name, it is not closely related to saltwater butterflyfishes.

== Evolution ==
The freshwater butterflyfish is the last surviving member of a family that was diverse during the Late Cretaceous period, with many pantodontid genera known from the Cenomanian-aged Sannine Formation of Lebanon. These early pantodontids inhabited a marine environment off the coast of northern Africa and are the earliest known marine osteoglossomorphs, suggesting that the ancestors of Pantodon colonized freshwater habitats independently of other osteoglossiforms. These Cretaceous marine pantodontids appear to vary in their relation to the extant genus; of them, the closest relative and sister genus to Pantodon appears to be Palaeopantodon.

Populations of freshwater butterflyfish in the Niger vs. the Congo basins appear virtually identical in morphology, but mtDNA divergence estimates suggest an extreme level of genetic divergence between them, dating to the Late Paleocene (57 million years ago) or earlier. This is one of the most dramatic cases of morphological stasis (in which two allopatric populations remain similar in appearance despite achieving a great level of genetic divergence from one another) known in a vertebrate taxon, and may suggest some level of cryptic speciation within the genus.

Genetic studies suggest that the freshwater butterflyfish has experienced one of the greatest losses of whole Hox gene clusters in a teleost fish, with only 5 Hox clusters present after a presumed loss of 3 Hox clusters in the past. Despite this, it retains a similar overall number of Hox genes to other teleosts, due to a high proportion of duplicated genes in certain clusters. Due to its small size, widespread availability in captivity, and relatively small genome, the freshwater butterflyfish may serve as an attractive model organism, despite being studied less compared to other model fish taxa, which are clupeocephalans.

== Description and ecology ==
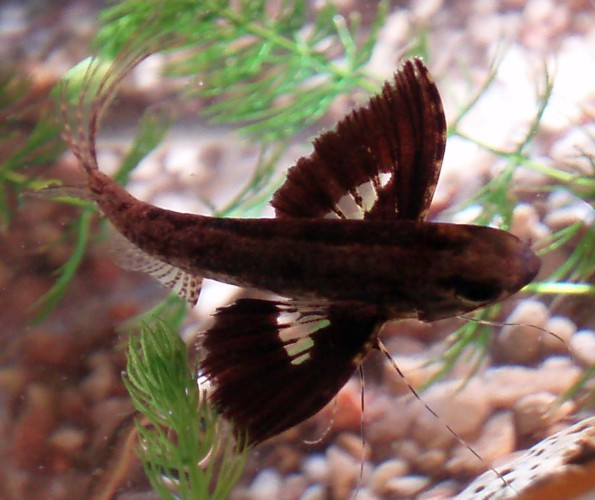
Seen from above

The freshwater butterflyfish is a relatively small species, usually reaching no more than 13 cm (5.1 in) in length. Its pectoral fins are very large relative to body size. It has a large and well-vascularized swim bladder, enabling it to breathe air at the surface of the water. It is carnivorous, feeding primarily on aquatic insects and smaller fishes.

The freshwater butterflyfish is a specialized surface hunter. Its eyes are constantly trained to the surface and its upturned mouth is specifically adapted to capturing small prey along the water surface. If enough speed is built up in the water, a butterflyfish can jump and glide a small distance above the surface to avoid predation. As it glides, it wiggles its pectoral fins with the help of specialized, enlarged pectoral muscles, and it is this ability that gave this fish its common name.

When freshwater butterflyfish spawn, they produce a mass of large floating eggs at the surface. Fertilisation is believed to be internal. Eggs hatch in about seven days.

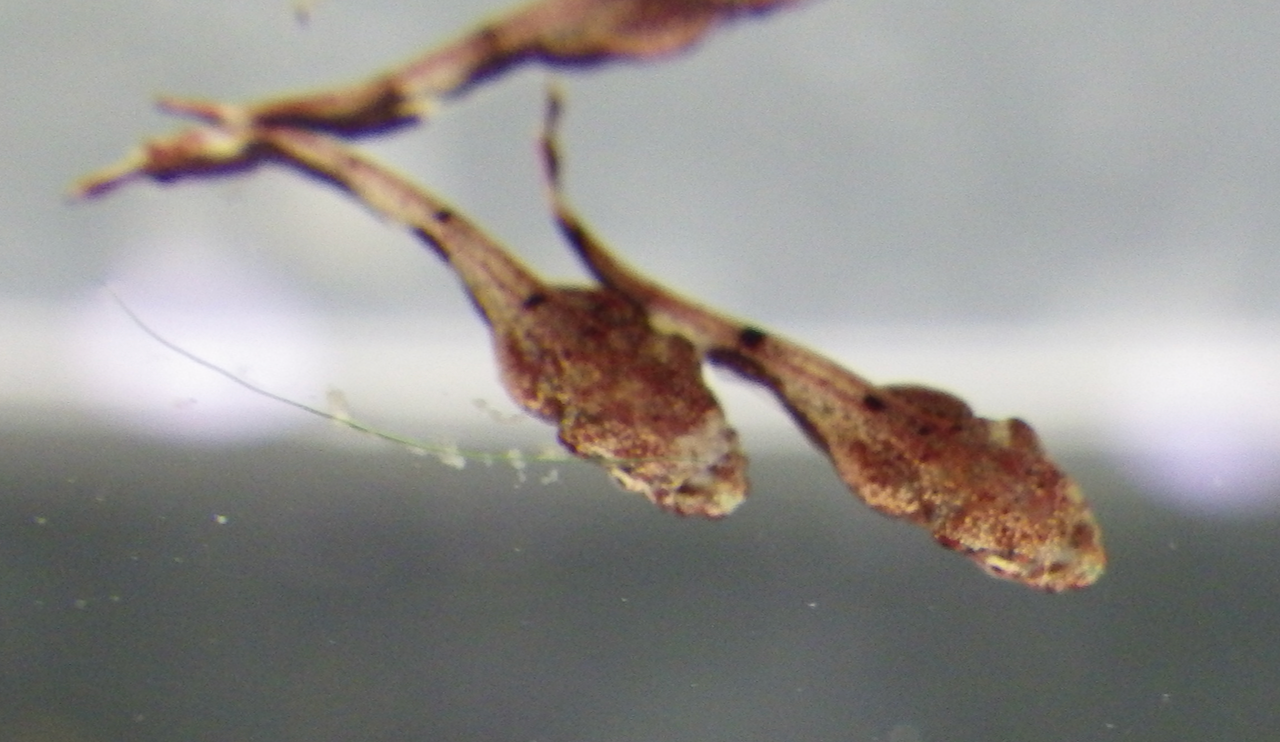
Freshwater butterflyfish fry

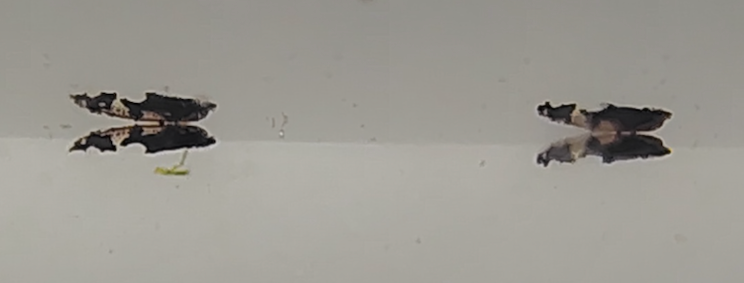
Freshwater butterflyfish fry, side view

== Distribution and habitat ==
The freshwater butterflyfish is commonly seen in Lake Chad, the Congo Basin, throughout lower Niger, Cameroon, Ogooue, and upper Zambezi. They have also been seen in the Niger Delta, lower Ogooue, and in the lower Cross River. Within these bodies of water, this species is found in slightly acidic standing water with high amounts of surface foliage for cover. This species requires a year-round temperature of 73–86 °F (23–30 °C).

== In the aquarium ==
Freshwater butterflyfish may be kept in large aquaria, although only a single specimen should be kept, as they can be aggressive to their own kind and other fish (such as hatchetfish) near the water surface. The top of the tank must be tightly sealed because of their jumping habits. They do better in a tank with live plants, especially ones that float near the surface, providing hiding places to reduce stress. They require a pH of 6.9–7.1, and a KH of 1–10. They should not be kept with fin-eating or aggressive fish, as such fish may nip at their long, trailing fins. They eat any fish small enough to fit in their mouths, so they should be maintained with bottom-dwelling fish or top- and mid-dwelling fish too large in size to be bothered by them. They generally will not eat prepared food, and do best on a diet of live or possibly canned crickets and other insects, as well as live, gut-loaded feeder fish (goldfish should be avoided). They prefer still water, so filtration should not be too powerful.

== See also ==
- Flying and gliding animals
- List of freshwater aquarium fish species
