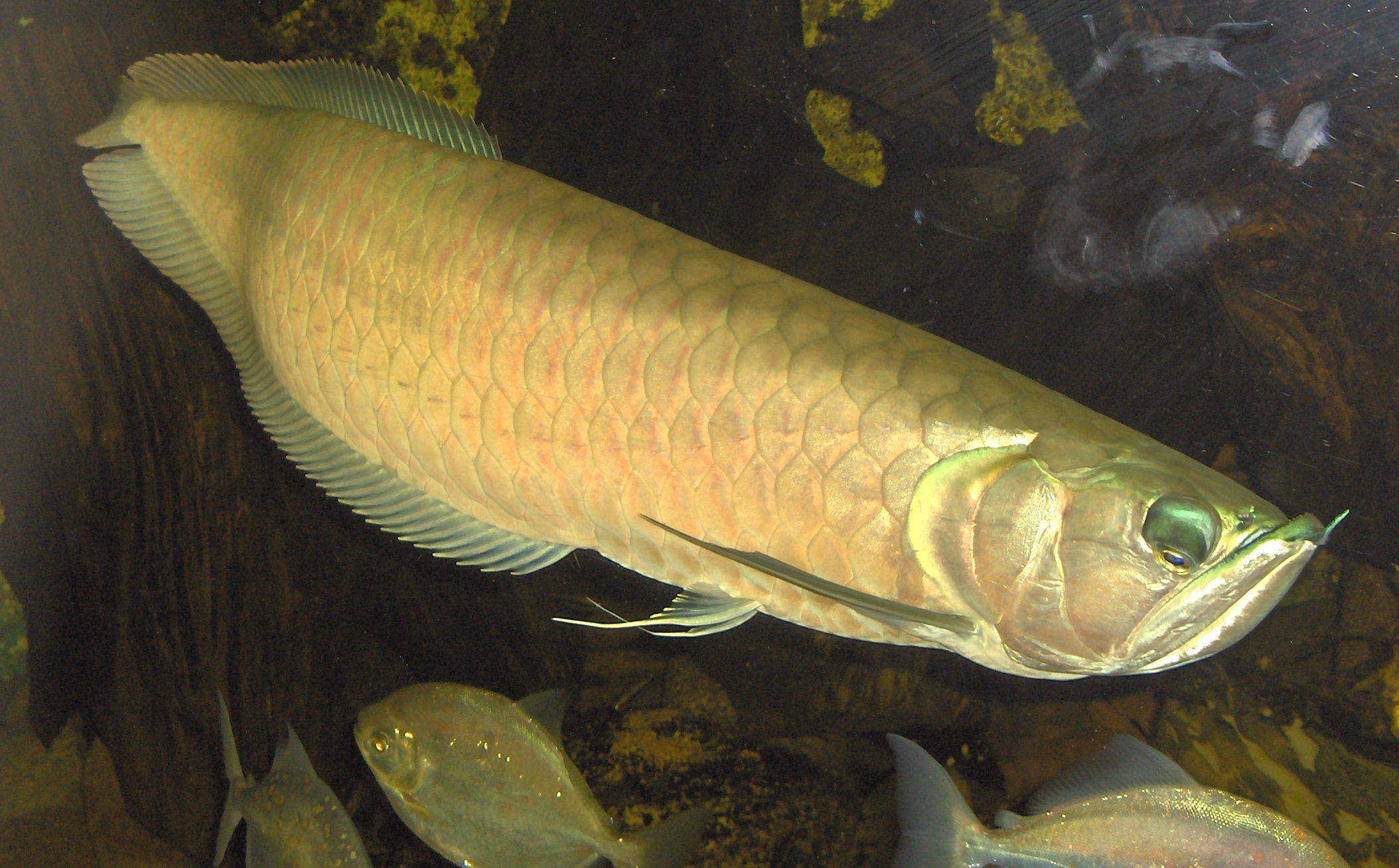
- Osteoglossum bicirrhosum

Scientific classification
- Kingdom: Animalia
- Phylum: Chordata
- Class: Actinopterygii
- Order: Osteoglossiformes
- Family: Osteoglossidae
- Genus: Osteoglossum; Cuvier, 1829

Species
- 2, see text
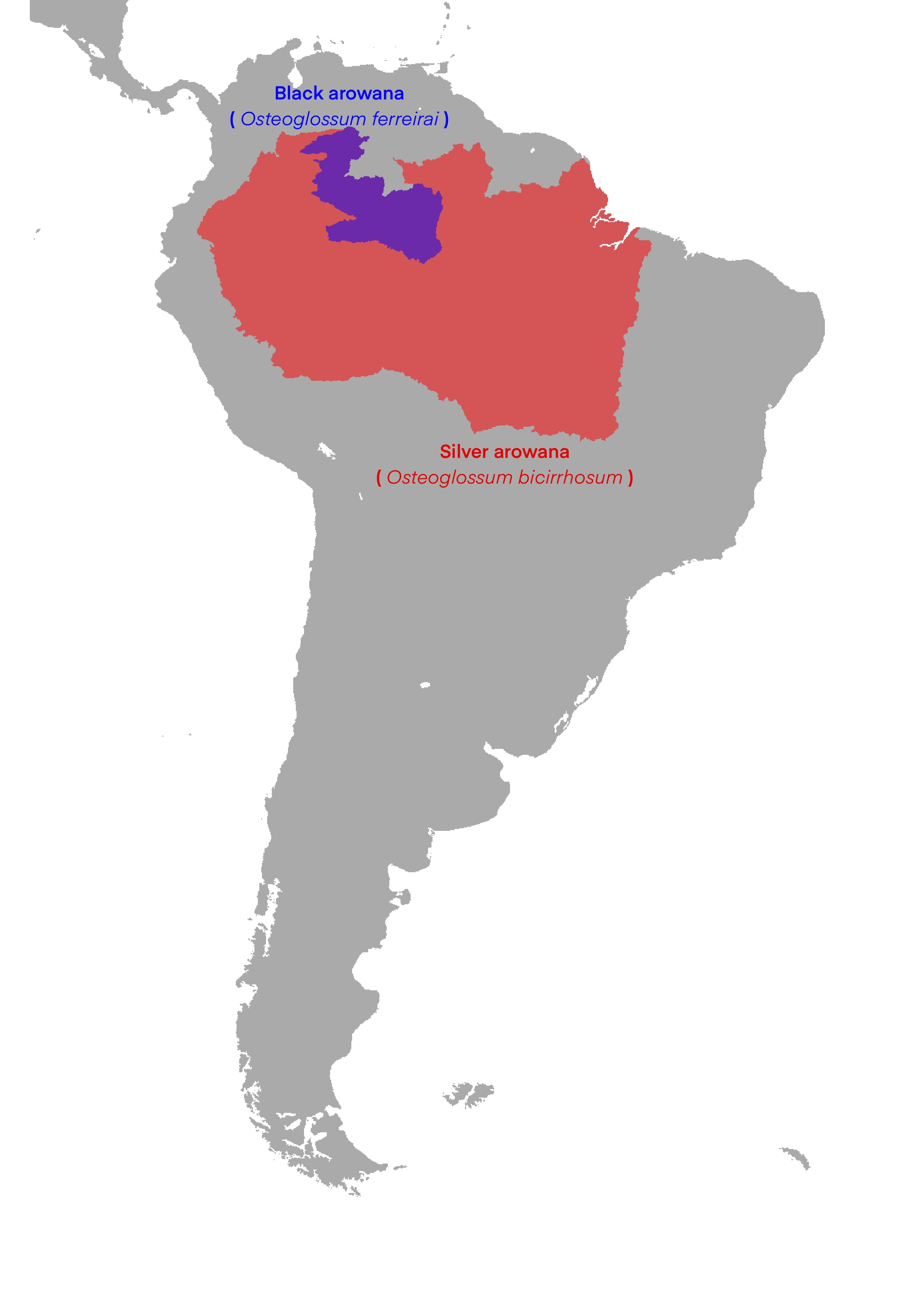

= Osteoglossum =

South American Arowanas

Genus of fishes

Osteoglossum is a genus of fish in the family Osteoglossidae. They reach about 1 m (3.3 ft) in length and are restricted to freshwater habitats in tropical South America.

These predators mostly feed on arthropods like insects and spiders, but may also take small vertebrates such as other fish, frogs, lizards, snakes, mice, bats and small birds. They jump up to 2 m (6.6 ft) out of the water to pick the prey off branches, tree trunks or foliage, which has earned them the local name "water monkeys". They are the largest fish in the world that catch most of their food out of water. When breeding, the male protects the eggs and young by carrying them in the mouth.

They are sometimes kept in aquariums, but they are predatory and require a very large tank.

== Species ==
There are two species:

Image	Scientific name	Common name	Distribution
	Osteoglossum bicirrhosum Cuvier (ex Vandelli), 1829	Silver arowana	Amazon, Essequibo and Oyapock basins
	Osteoglossum ferreirai Kanazawa, 1966	Black arowana	Rio Negro basin, including the Branco River
