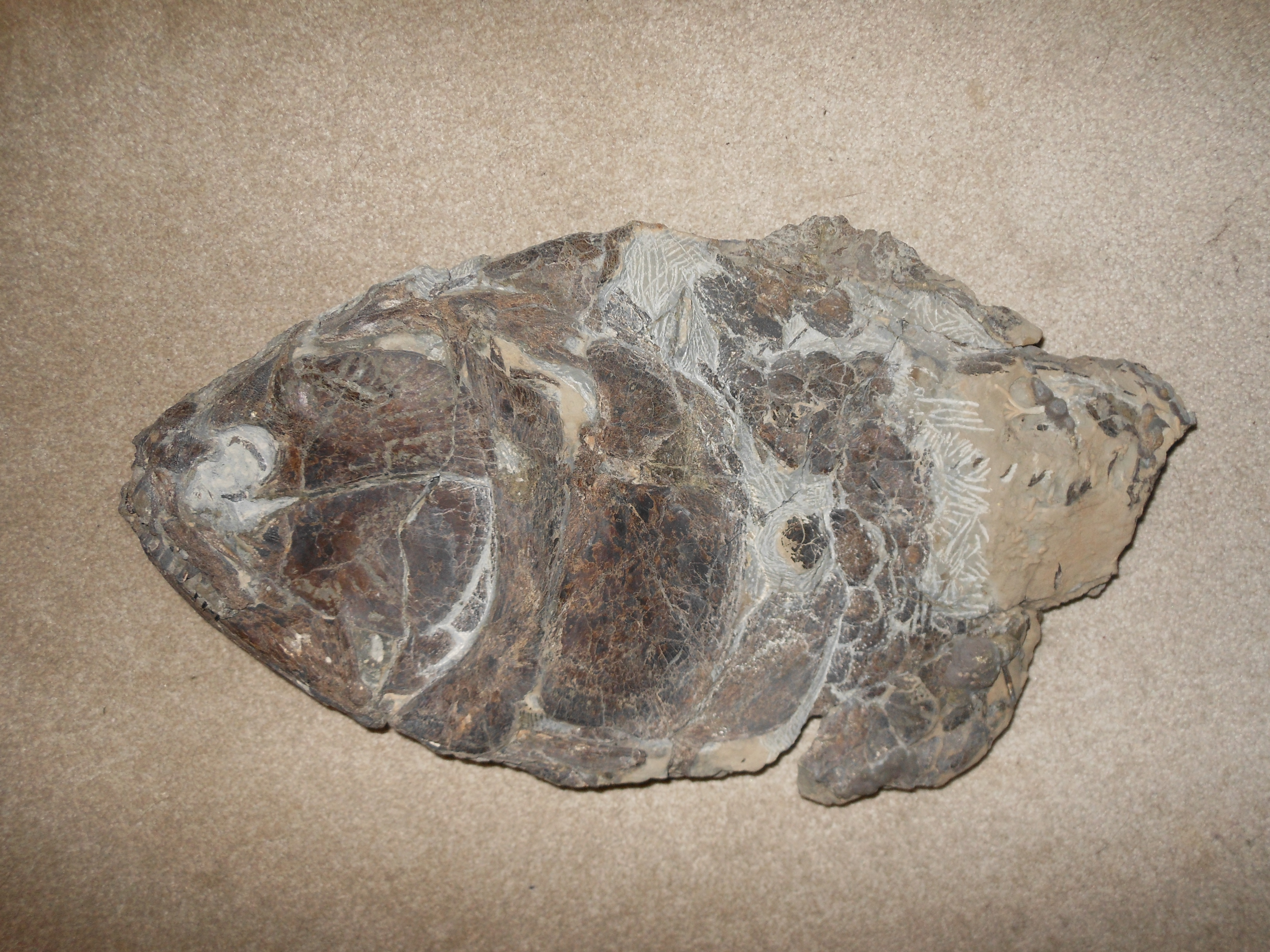
- B. muelleri fish head from the Eocene London Clay on the Isle of Sheppey UK

Scientific classification
- Kingdom: Animalia
- Phylum: Chordata
- Class: Actinopterygii
- Order: Osteoglossiformes
- Family: Osteoglossidae
- Subfamily: †Phareodontinae
- Genus: †Brychaetus; Woodward, 1901

Species
- †B. muelleri Woodward, 1901

Synonyms
- Pomphractus; Platops

= Brychaetus =

Brychaetus Temporal range: Maastrichtian–Late Eocene

Extinct genus of fishes

Brychaetus is an extinct genus of prehistoric marine bonytongue fish known from the Late Cretaceous to the late Eocene of Europe, North America, and northern Africa.

== Taxonomy ==
Brychaetus contains a single valid species, B. muelleri from the Ypresian of England (London Clay) and the eastern United States (Nanjemoy Formation in Maryland and Virginia, Tuscahoma Formation of Mississippi), with specimens from elsewhere being placed only at genus level due to their fragmentary nature. A record of B. muelleri from the Paleocene of Niger was reassigned to an extinct arowana, Scleropages africanus. Another species, B. schnarrenbergeri Zotz, 1928, was described from the Eocene of Alsace (France), but its assignment to Brychaetus was later found to be a misidentification. Another species, B. caheni from the Paleocene of Cabinda (Angola), was later reclassified into its own genus, Ridewoodichthys.

It was the first marine bonytongue described from the fossil record; although other marine bonytongues such as Monopteros and Thrissopterus were described before it, they were not initially recognized as bonytongues. It belonged to a now-extinct clade of marine and freshwater bonytongues known as the Phareodontinae, which also contained the well-known Phareodus and several other species.

== Description ==
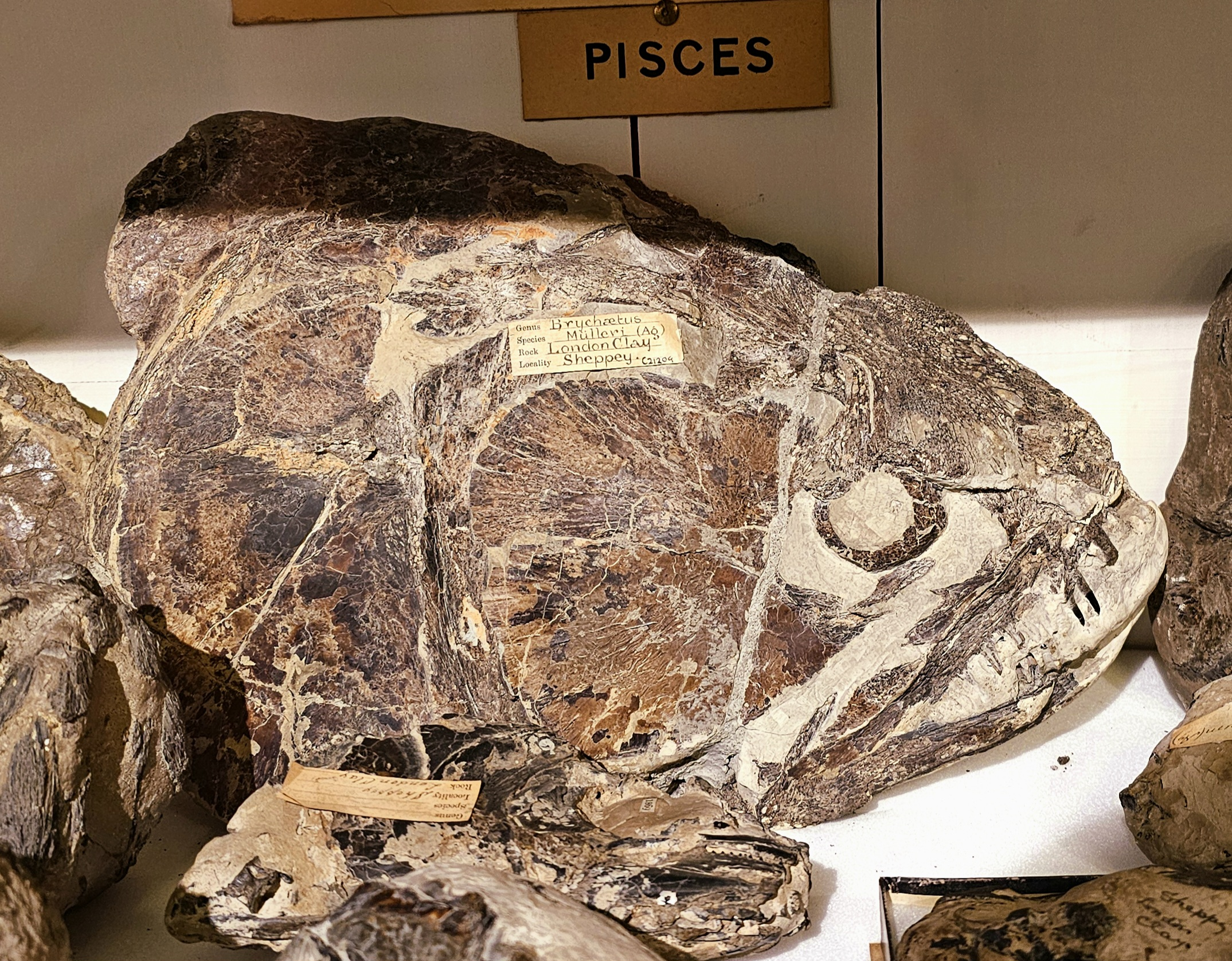
Skull and front part of body in Sedgwick Museum

Brychaetus had very long teeth which were half bone and half enamel. It is thought to be related to the modern arowana, although the presence of a sclerotic ossicle in their specimens suggests that they were a deep-water fish unlike modern day arowanas, which are surface feeders.

== Paleoecology ==
The earliest record of Brychaetus is a dentary from the Maastrichtian of Mali, indicating that it inhabited the Trans-Saharan seaway and survived the Cretaceous-Paleogene extinction event. This dentary is relatively gracile compared to the later species. Brychaetus remains become more common during the Eocene, being known from England, Denmark, and the United States (Louisiana, Mississippi, Maryland, and Virginia), and Nigeria, as well as still being known from the Trans-Saharan seaway in Mali. A potential record is also known in teeth and a dentary fragment from the Eocene of Morocco, which was initially identified as B. muelleri; however, the subsequent identification of other concurrent marine osteoglossid genera from the Mediterranean (Monopteros and Thrissopterus) suggests that this identification is questionable. The last record of Brychaetus is from the late Eocene Yazoo Clay of Louisiana.

== See also ==
- Prehistoric fish
- List of prehistoric bony fish
