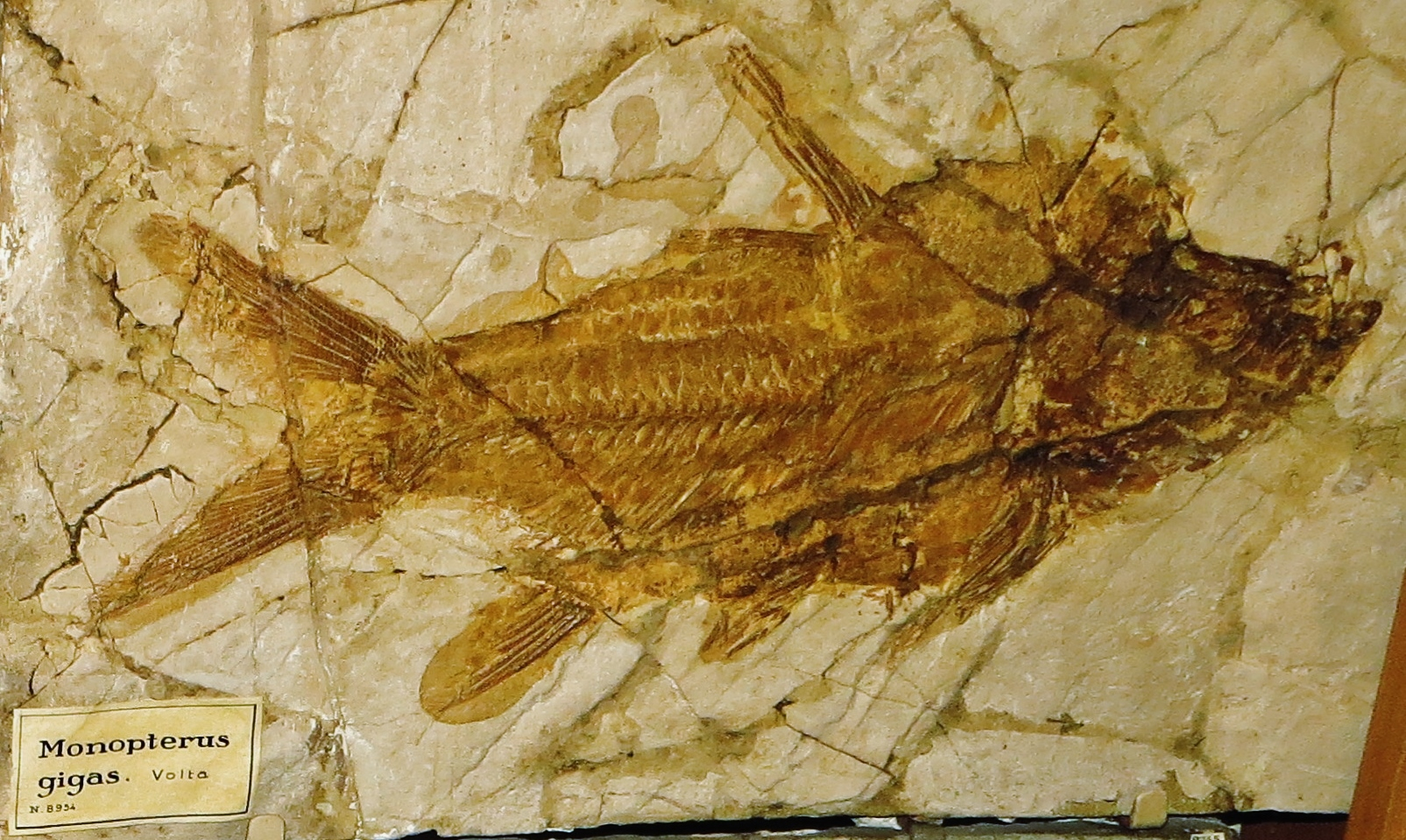

Scientific classification
- Kingdom: Animalia
- Phylum: Chordata
- Class: Actinopterygii
- Order: Osteoglossiformes
- Family: Osteoglossidae
- Subfamily: †Phareodontinae
- Genus: †Monopteros; Volta, 1796
- Species: †M. gigas

Binomial name
- †Monopteros gigas Volta, 1796

= Monopteros (fish) =

Monopteros Temporal range: Early Eocene

Monopteros is an extinct genus of marine bonytongue fish known from the Eocene. It contains a single species, M. gigas, known from the Early Eocene of Monte Bolca, Italy. Its genus name, Monopteros meaning "one wing", comes from its large, elongated pectoral fins. The species name, gigas, refers to its relatively large size at 448 millimetres (1.470 ft) in length.

It is thought to be a member of the extinct subfamily Phareodontinae, or at least closely related to it. Some earlier authorities erroneously placed it as a species of the late-surviving crossognathiform Platinx, which it co-occurred with.
