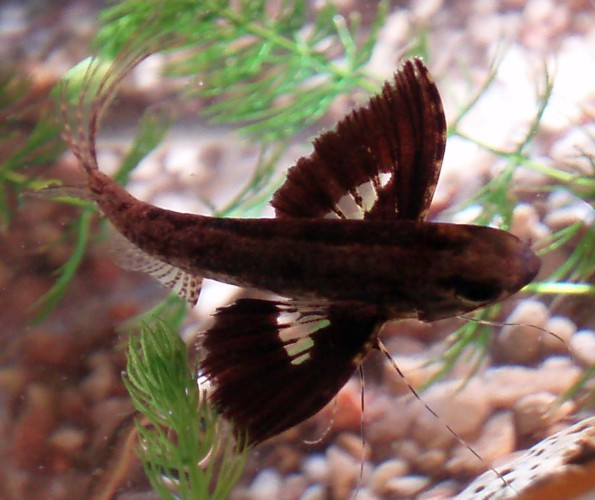
- Freshwater butterflyfish (Pantodon buchholzi)

Scientific classification
- Kingdom: Animalia
- Phylum: Chordata
- Class: Actinopterygii
- Order: Osteoglossiformes
- Family: Pantodontidae; Peters, 1876

Genera
- See text

= Pantodontidae =

Pantodontidae Temporal range: Late Cenomanian to recent

Family of ray-finned fishes

Pantodontidae is a family of ray-finned fish in the order Osteoglossiformes. It contains the living freshwater butterflyfish (Pantodon buchholzi) of Africa, as well as several extinct marine species from the Late Cretaceous (Cenomanian) of the Sannine Formation in Lebanon.

== Taxonomy ==
The Cretaceous marine pantodontids are among the earliest known marine osteoglossomorph genera. They physically differ greatly from Pantodon, to the extent that some of them were previously considered either ancestral codlets or crestfish, but they all share specific cranial elements with the extant Pantodon, supporting their relationship to it. They seem to form a grade leading to the extant Pantodon, where Capassopiscis appears to be the most basal genus, while Palaeopantodon appears to be the sister genus to Pantodon, with the rest occupying successive positions between these two genera. The marine nature of ancestral pantodontids suggests that Pantodon colonized freshwater habitats independent of other osteoglossiform fish.

=== Genera ===
- Pantodon Peters, 1877
  - Pantodon buchholzi Peters, 1877 (freshwater butterflyfish)
- †Capassopiscis Taverne, 2022
  - †Capassopiscis pankowskii Taverne, 2022
- †Cretapantodon Taverne, 2024
  - †Cretapantodon polli Taverne, 2024
- †Palaeopantodon Taverne, 2021
  - †Palaeopantodon vandersypeni Taverne, 2021
- †Pankowskipiscis Taverne, 2021
  - †Pankowskipiscis haqelensis Taverne, 2021
- †Petersichthys Taverne, 2021
  - †Petersichthys libanicus Taverne, 2021
- †Prognathoglossum Taverne & Capasso, 2012
  - †Prognathoglossum kalassyi Taverne & Capasso, 2012
