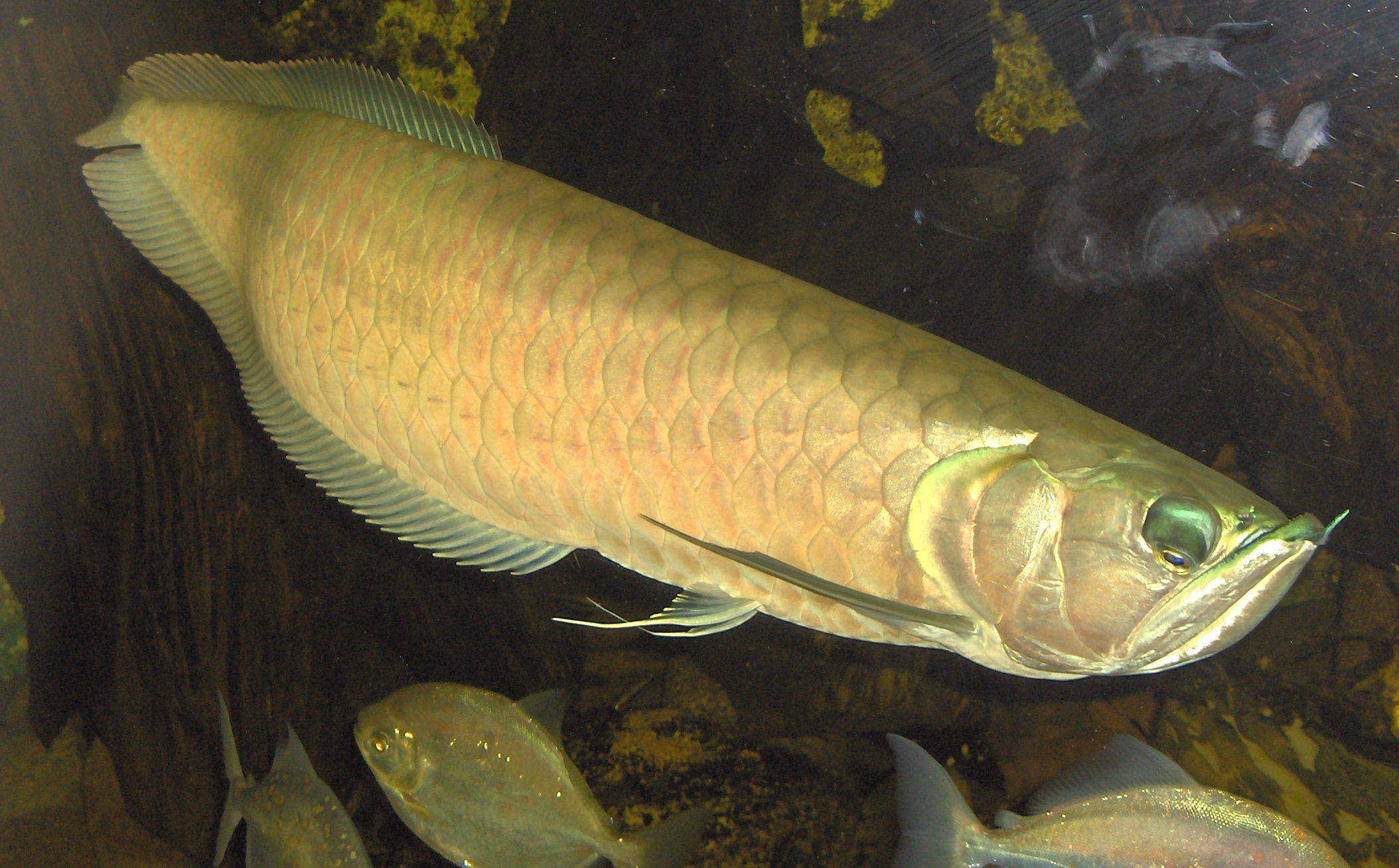
- Silver arowana, Osteoglossum bicirrhosum
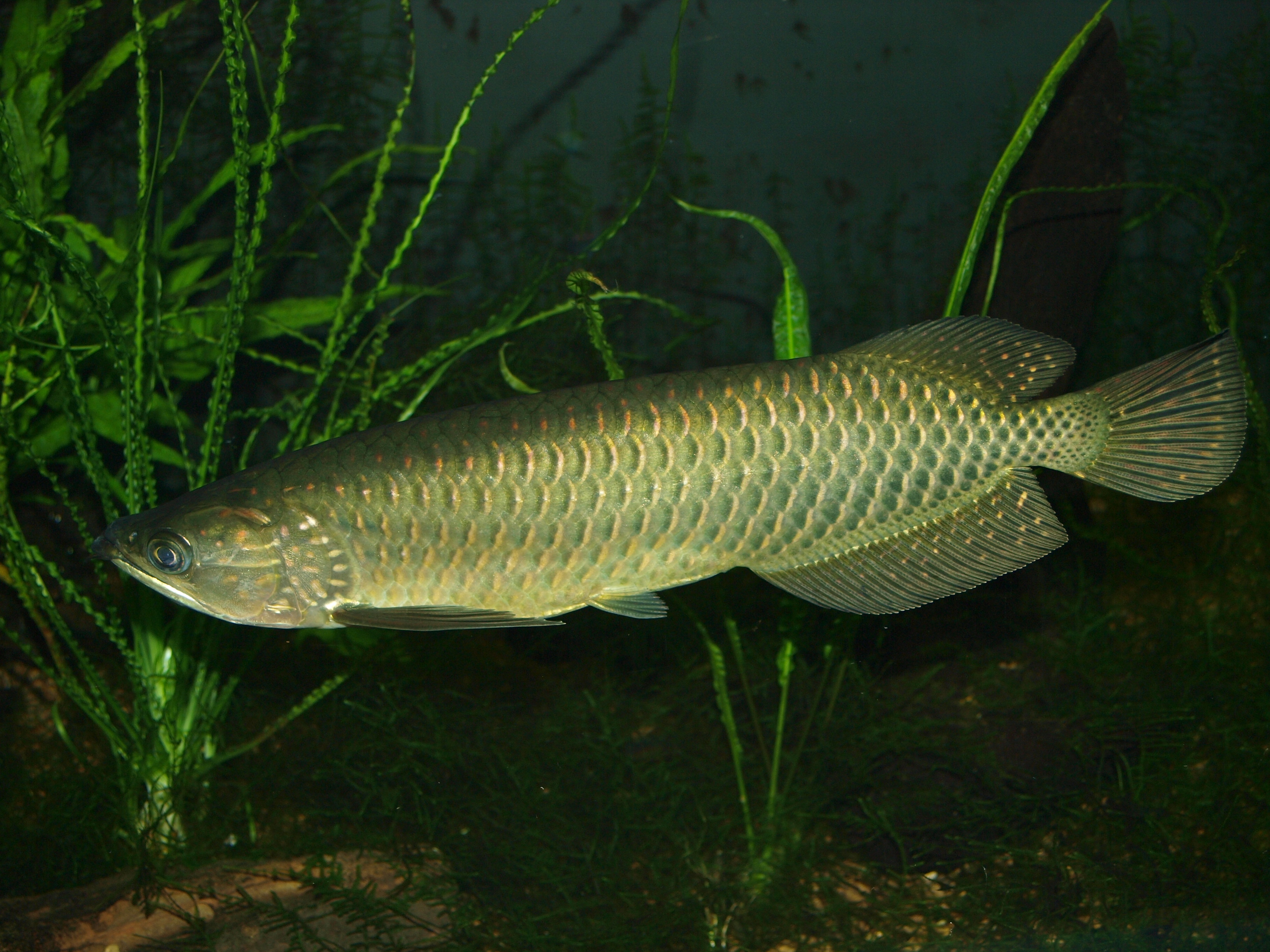
- Southern saratoga, Scleropages leichardtii

Scientific classification
- Kingdom: Animalia
- Phylum: Chordata
- Class: Actinopterygii
- Division: Teleostei
- Order: Osteoglossiformes
- Family: Osteoglossidae
- Subfamily: Osteoglossinae; Bonaparte, 1831

Genera
- Osteoglossum; Scleropages
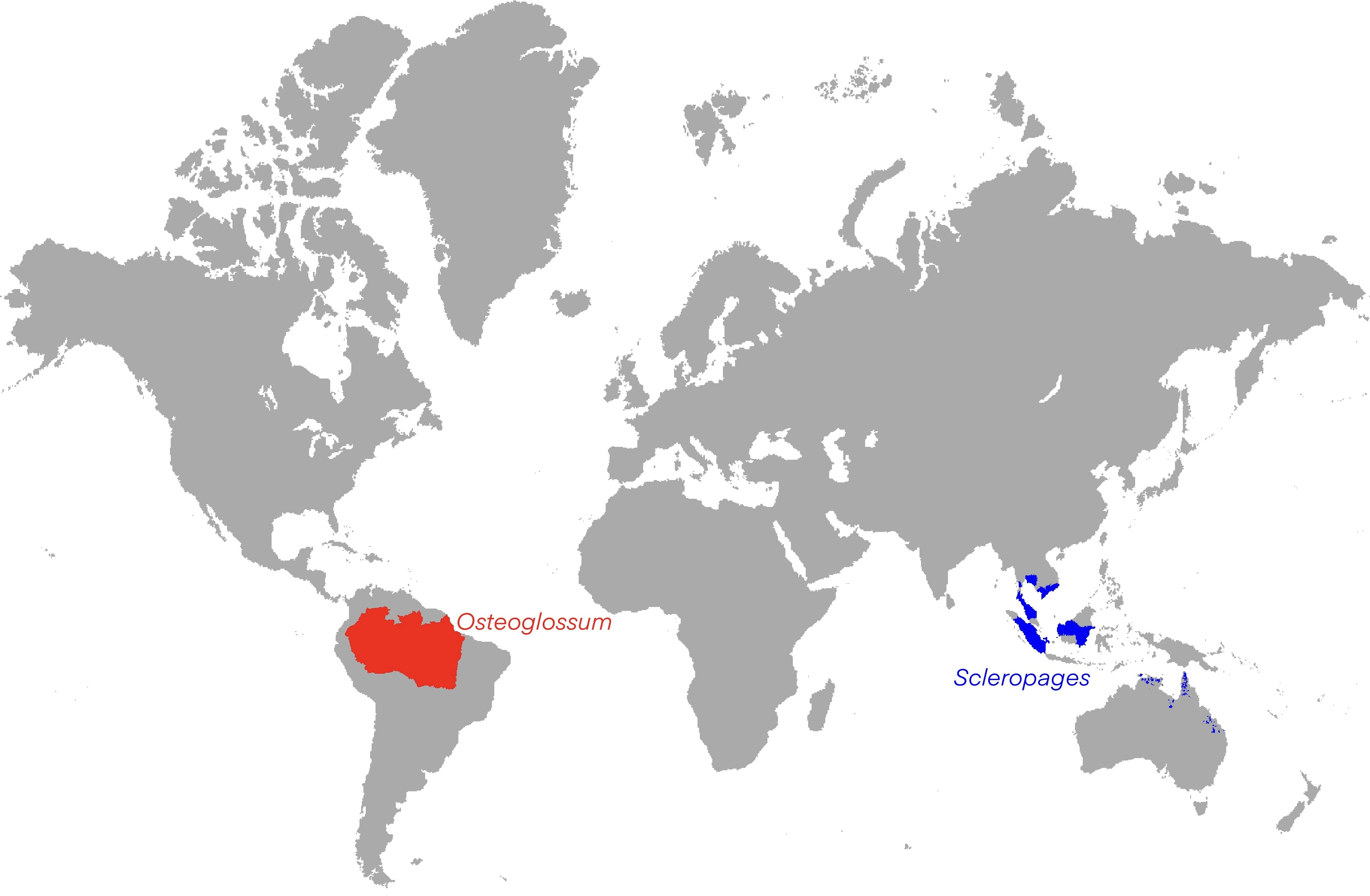

= Arowana =

Subfamily of freshwater fish

Osteoglossinae are a subfamily of freshwater bony fish, commonly known as arowanas or bonytongues (though the latter is also used for other osteoglossiform fish). The name "bonytongues" is derived from a toothed bone on the floor of the mouth, the "tongue", equipped with teeth that bite against teeth on the roof of the mouth. In this family of fish, the head is bony and the elongated body is covered by large, heavy scales, with a mosaic pattern of canals. The dorsal and anal fins have soft rays and have long fin origins, while the pectoral and ventral fins have stiffer, longer rays. Arowanas are facultative air breathers and can obtain oxygen by ingesting air into its swim bladder, which is lined with capillaries like lung tissue. Despite this, they are not considered amphibious.

The two genera each inhabit a different continent despite its members being freshwater fish, which suggests vicariance from the breakup of Gondwana.

== Nomenclature ==
The name comes from the Tupí language arua'ná, aruanã, or arauaná.

=== Taxonomy ===
- Subfamily Osteoglossinae Bonaparte, 1831
  - Genus Scleropages Günther, 1864
  - Genus Osteoglossum Agassiz ex Spix & Agassiz, 1829 non Basilewsky, 1855

== Evolution ==
At least five extinct genera, known only from fossils, are classified as osteoglossids; these date back at least as far as the Late Cretaceous. Other fossils from as far back as the Late Jurassic or Early Cretaceous are widely considered to belong to the arowana superorder Osteoglossomorpha. Osteoglossomorph fossils have been found on all continents except Antarctica. These fossil genera include Brychaetus, Joffrichthys, and Phareodus.

Within Osteoglossinae, the South America Osteoglossum arowanas diverged from the Asian and Australian Scleropages arowanas about 170 Mya, during the Middle Jurassic.

Osteoglossidae (represented by Scleropages) are the only exclusively freshwater fish family found on both sides of the Wallace Line. This may be explained by the theory that Asian arowanas (S. formosus) diverged from the Australian Scleropages, S. jardinii and S. leichardti, about 140 Mya, making it likely that Asian arowanas were carried to Asia on the Indian subcontinent.

== Behavior ==
Osteoglossids are carnivorous, often being specialized surface feeders. They are excellent jumpers; Osteoglossum species have been seen leaping more than 6 feet (1.8 m) from the water surface to pick off insects and birds from overhanging branches in South America, hence the nickname "water monkeys". Arowana species typically grow to around 2 to 3 feet (0.6 to 0.9 m) in captivity.

Several species of osteoglossids exhibit parental care. They build nests and protect their young after they hatch. All species are mouthbrooders, the parents holding sometimes hundreds of eggs in their mouths. The young may make several tentative trips outside the parent's mouth to investigate the surroundings before leaving permanently. Unlike most fishes that start reproducing at around six months of age, the arowana usually takes three to four years to reach sexual maturity.

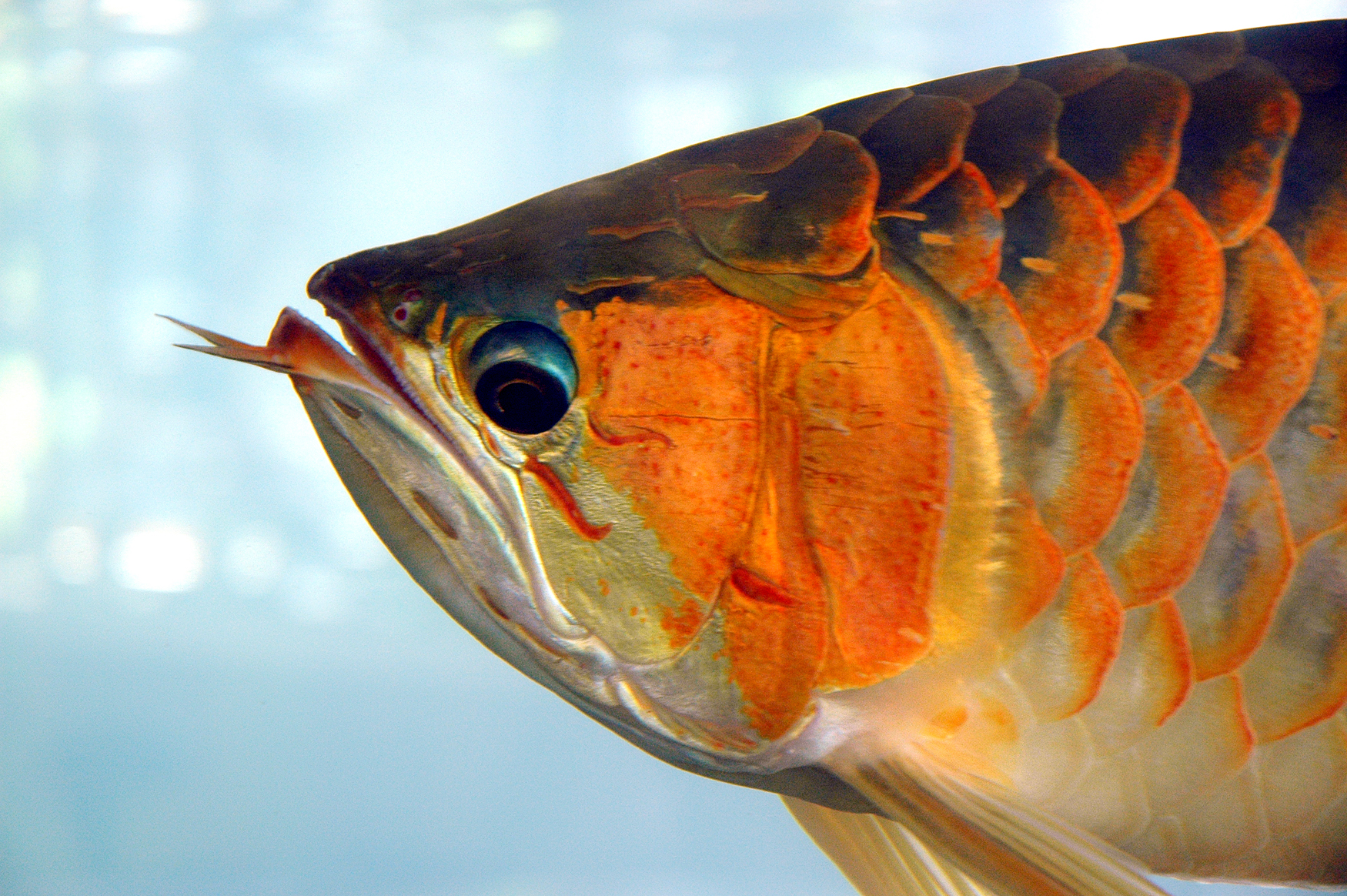
The "super red" form of the Asian arowana (Scleropages formosus, sometimes considered its own species S. legendrei), is one of the most highly valued aquarium fish.
