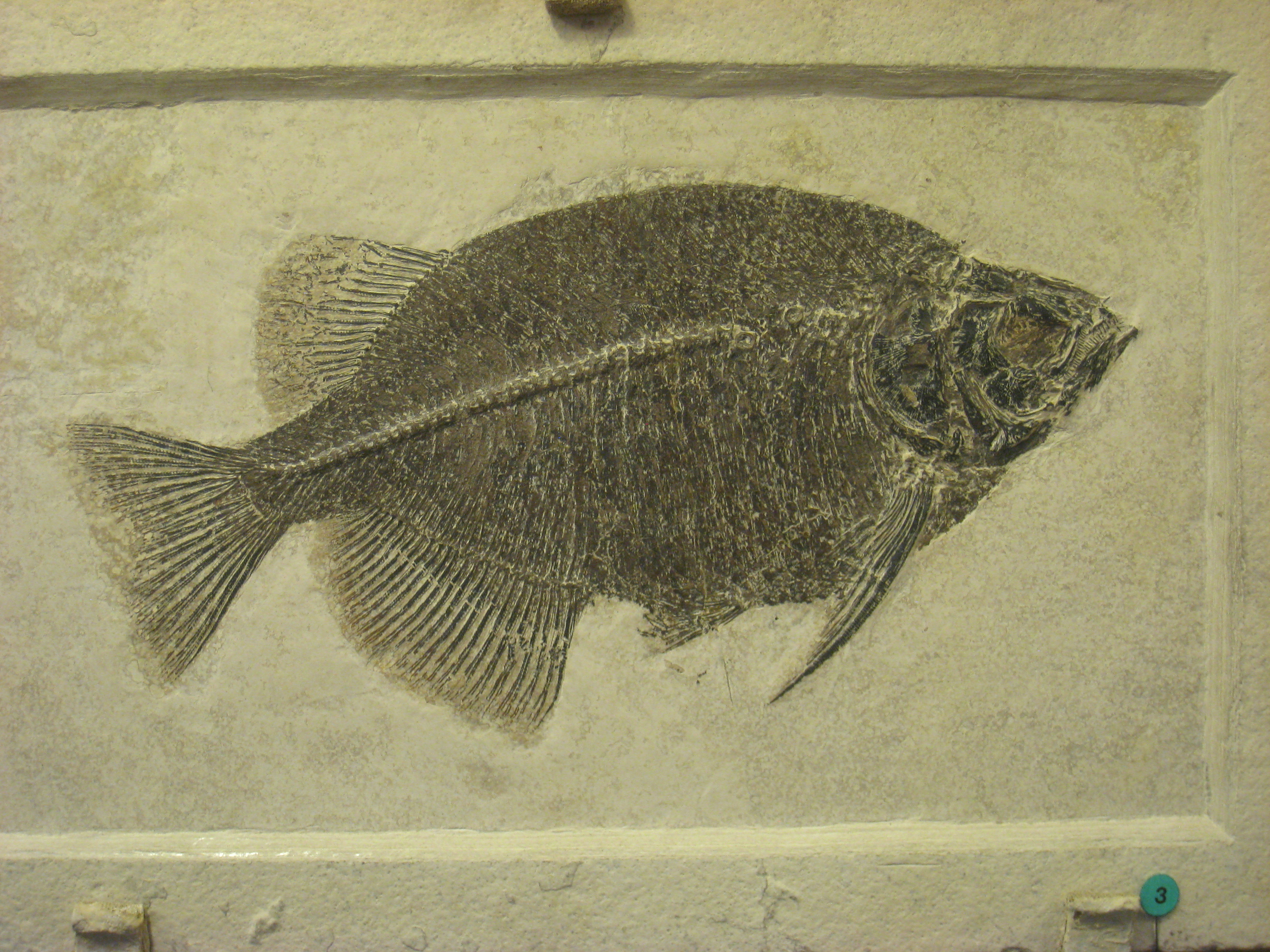
- Phareodus testis fossil, at the Buffalo Museum of Science

Scientific classification
- Kingdom: Animalia
- Phylum: Chordata
- Class: Actinopterygii
- Division: Teleostei
- Order: Osteoglossiformes
- Family: Osteoglossidae
- Subfamily: †Phareodontinae
- Genus: †Phareodus; Leidy, 1873

Type species
- Phareodus encaustus Cope, 1871

Other species
- P. testis (Leidy, 1873); P. queenslandicus (Hills, 1934)

Synonyms
- Dapedoglossus

= Phareodus =

Phareodus Temporal range: Paleocene-Eocene ~65–46 Ma

Extinct genus of bony fishes

Phareodus is a genus of freshwater fish from the Paleocene to Eocene of North America and Australia.

This genus includes three species, P. testis (Leidy, 1873) and P. encaustus of North America, and P. queenslandicus.

Formerly included was P. muelleri of Europe, now accepted in the related genus Brychaetus as B. muelleri. P. queenslandicus of Australia was reassigned to Phareoides in 1973, however this genus was later deemed a junior synonym of Phareodus, and the species was reassigned back into Phareodus in 1994. Representatives have been found in the middle Eocene of North America's Green River Formation in Wyoming, United States, and the Eocene of Australia's Redbank Plains Formation in Queensland. A tentatively identified Phareodus fossil was reported in 2023 from the Chuckanut Formation in Washington.

Fossils similar to the genus have also been found in the Paleocene (Tiupampan) Santa Lucía Formation of Bolivia.

Phareodus was a freshwater fish with an oval outline, a small head, and a slightly pointed snout. Its dorsal and anal fins were situated posteriorly, with the anal fin being larger. Its caudal fin was slightly forked. It had small pelvic fins but long, narrow pectoral fins.

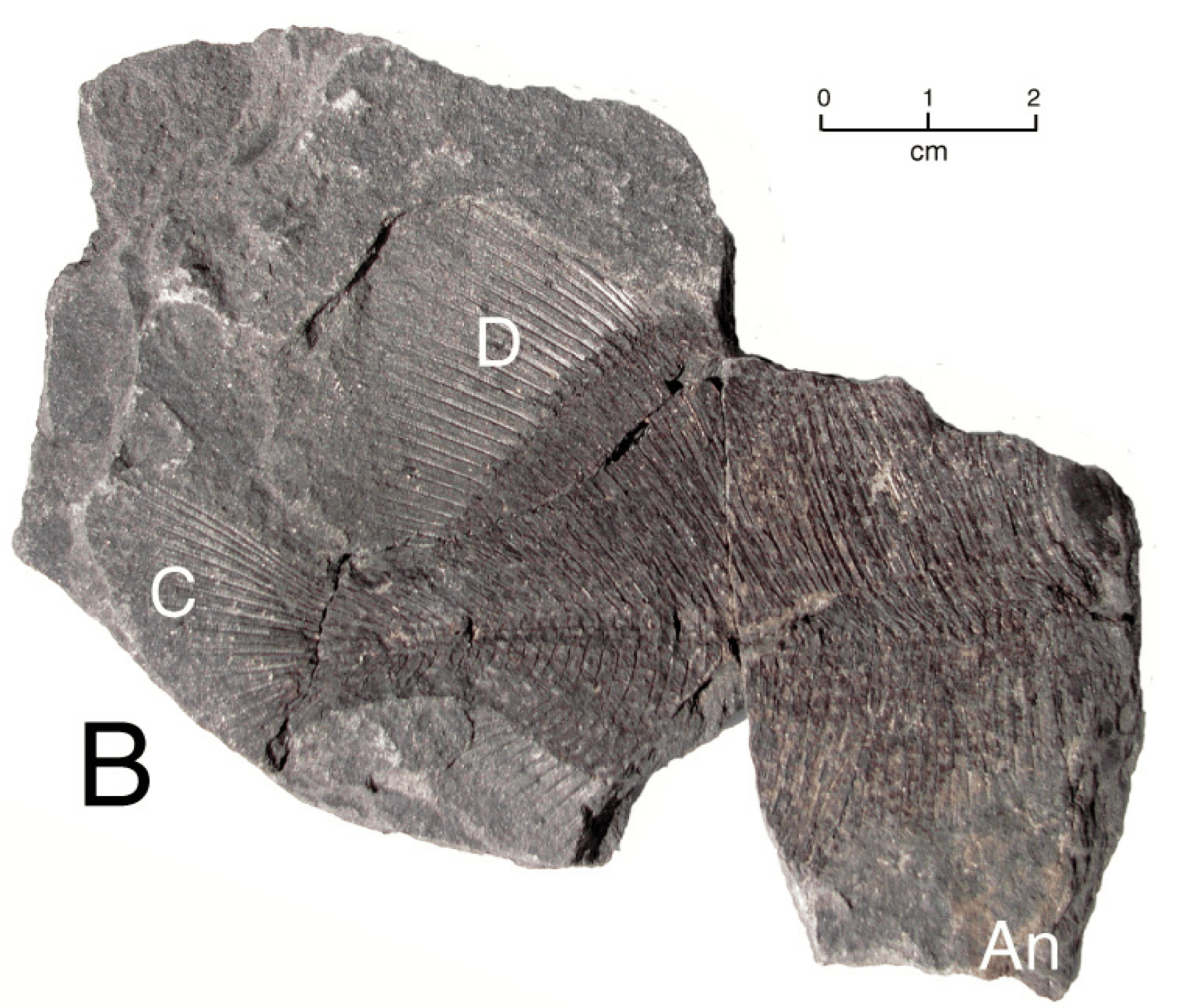
Phareodus sp, from the Chuckanut Formation, Western Washington University specimen
