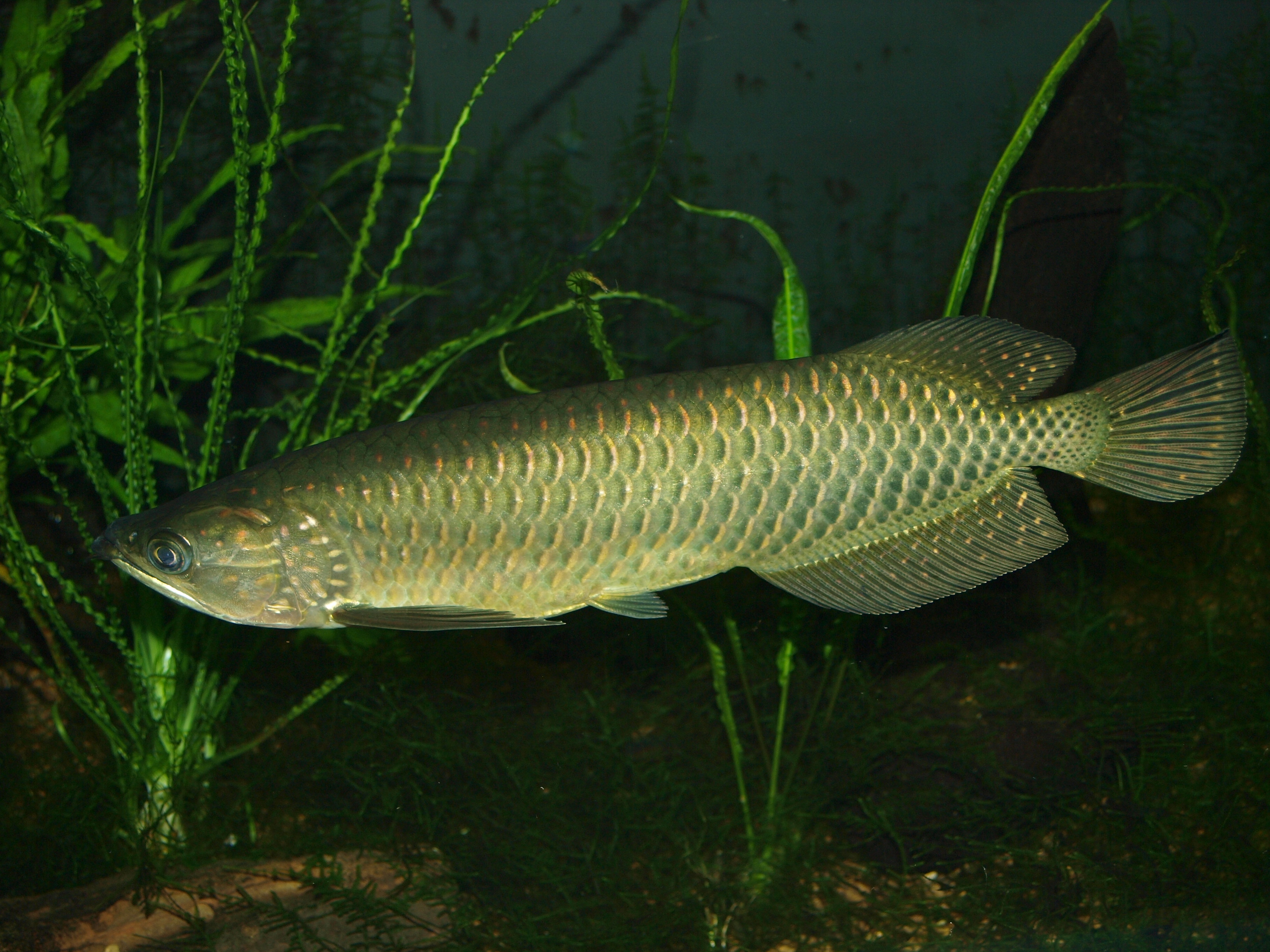
- Scleropages leichardti, an osteoglossine from Queensland, Australia

Scientific classification
- Kingdom: Animalia
- Phylum: Chordata
- Class: Actinopterygii
- Order: Osteoglossiformes
- Family: Osteoglossidae; Bonaparte, 1831

Genera
- See text

= Osteoglossidae =

Osteoglossidae Temporal range: Campanian to present Possible Albian record

Family of ray-finned fishes

Osteoglossidae is a family of large-sized freshwater fish, which includes the arowanas. They are commonly known as bonytongues. The family has been regarded as containing two extant subfamilies Arapaiminae and Osteoglossinae, with a total of five living genera, but these are regarded as valid families in Eschmeyer's Catalog of Fishes The extinct Phareodontinae are known from worldwide during the Late Cretaceous and Paleogene; they are generally considered to be crown group osteoglossids that are more closely related to one of the extant osteoglossid subfamilies than the other, though their exact position varies.

== Evolution ==
Osteoglossids are basal teleosts that originated during the Cretaceous, and are placed in the actinopterygian order Osteoglossiformes. The traditionally defined wider family includes several extant species from South America, one from Africa, two from Asia, and two from Australia. The earliest known osteoglossid is Cretophareodus from the middle Campanian of the Dinosaur Park Formation, Canada, but a potentially older genus may be Chanopsis from the Albian of the Democratic Republic of the Congo.

Although currently restricted to freshwater habitats in the tropics, the group was much more widespread during the Cretaceous and Paleogene, with genera known from North America and Europe, including marine taxa such as Brychaetus. An indeterminate marine osteoglossid is known to have inhabited the seas around Greenland in the Early Paleocene, and they later become diverse in marine habitats during the Eocene, with many genera known from Europe.

Modern osteoglossids of both subfamilies have a roughly Gondwanan distribution confined to freshwater habitats. For this reason, it was formerly assumed that extant osteoglossids descend from an ancestor that inhabited the supercontinent of Gondwana during the Mesozoic, which split into different genera following its fragmentation. However, more recent studies have found that many of the closest extinct relatives to extant osteoglossid genera were marine fish, and thus that their current distribution likely originates from marine dispersal between different continents during the Paleogene. Incorporating both extant and extinct osteoglossids, at least four different colonizations of freshwater habitats from marine ones are predicted to have occurred.

== Taxonomy ==
The following taxa are known from the family:

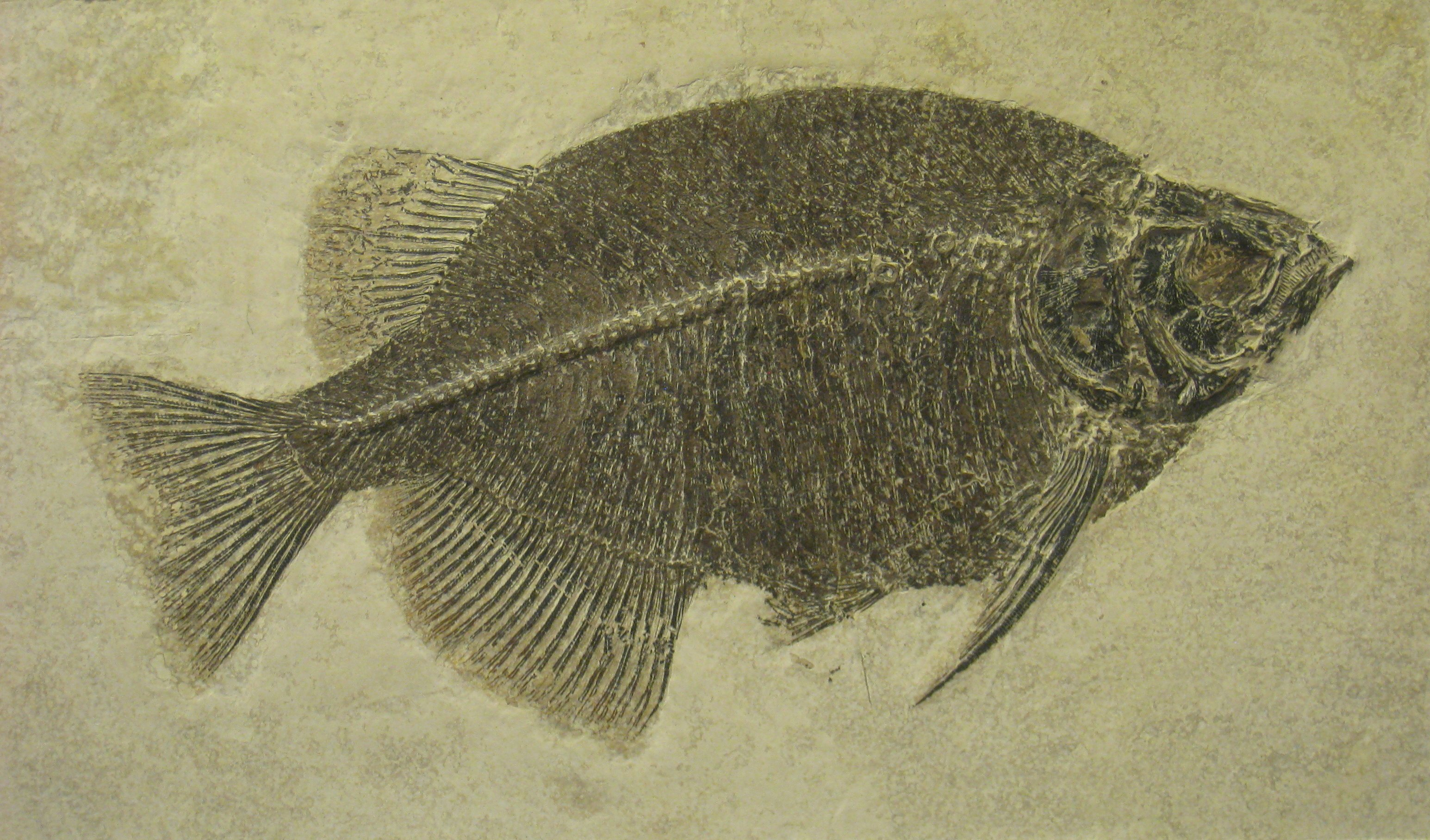
- Phareodus testis, a famous member of the extinct subfamily Phareodontinae
  Family Osteoglossidae Bonaparte, 1831
  - Genus ?†Chanopsis Casier, 1961
  - Genus ?†Chauliopareion Murray and Wilson, 2005 (possibly a basal osteoglossiform)
  - Genus †Heterosteoglossum Bonde, 2008 (possibly an arapaimine)
  - Genus ?†Singida Greenwood & Patterson, 1967 (possibly a basal osteoglossiform)
  - Genus †Xosteoglossid Bonde, 2008 (possibly an arapaimine)
  - Subfamily Osteoglossinae Bonaparte, 1831
    - Genus Osteoglossum Cuvier, 1829
    - Genus Scleropages Günther, 1864
  - Subfamily †Phareodontinae D. S. Jordan, 1925
    - Genus †Brychaetoides Bonde, 2008
    - Genus †Brychaetus Woodward, 1901
    - Genus †Cretophareodus Li, 1996
    - Genus ?†Foreyichthys Taverne, 1979
    - Genus †Furichthys Bonde, 2008
    - Genus †Macroprosopon Capobianco, Zouhri & Friedman, 2024
    - Genus †Magnigena Forey & Hilton, 2010
    - Genus †Monopteros Volta, 1796
    - Genus †Musperia Sanders, 1934
    - Genus ?†Opsithrissops Daniltshenko, 1968
    - Genus †Phareoides Taverne, 1973 (sometimes treated as synonymous with Phareodus)
    - Genus †Phareodus Leidy, 1873
    - Genus †Phareodusichthys Gayet, 1991
    - Genus †Ridewoodichthys Taverne, 2009
    - Genus †Taverneichthys Kumar, Rana & Paliwal, 2005

The Phareodontinae is sometimes treated as a valid family, the Phareodontidae, proposed by Jordan in 1925.
