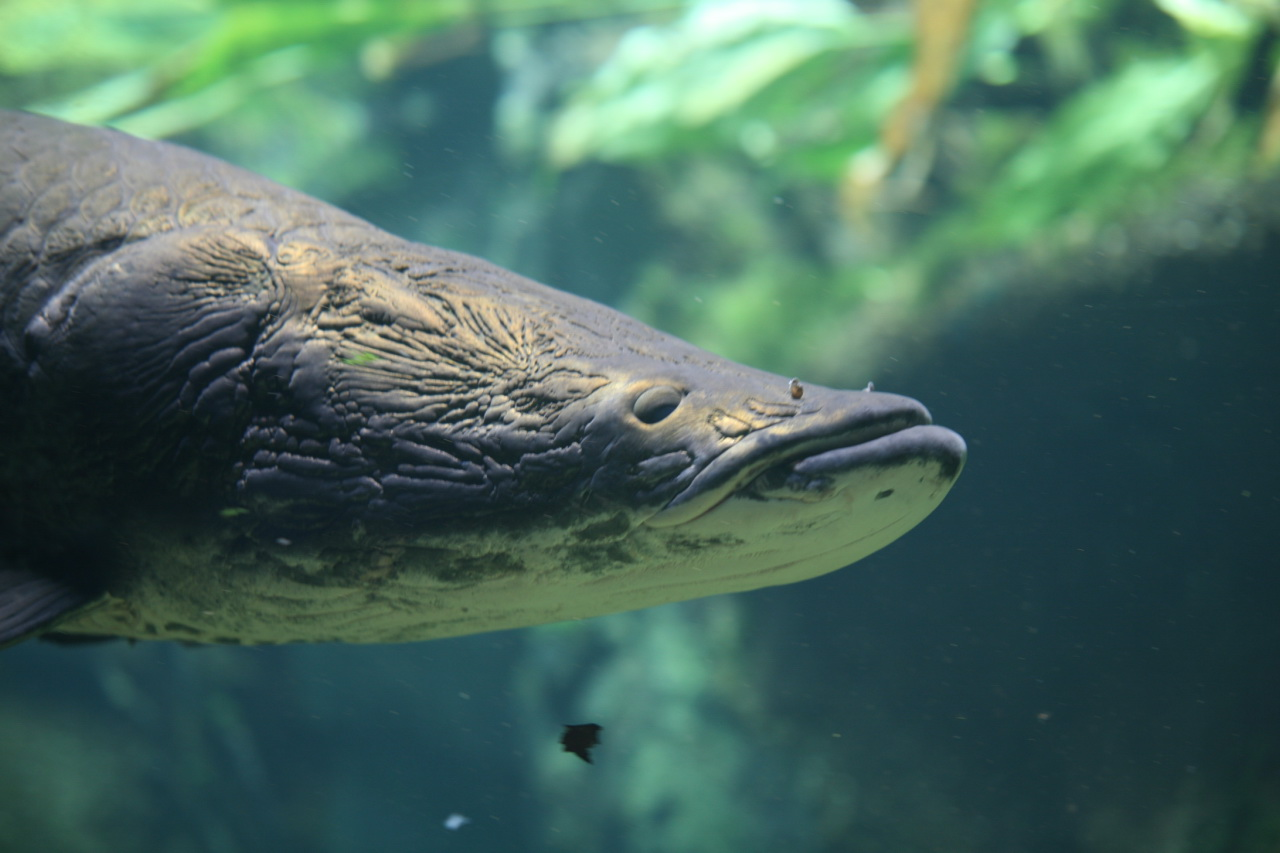
- Arapaima (Arapaima gigas)

Scientific classification
- Kingdom: Animalia
- Phylum: Chordata
- Class: Actinopterygii
- Clade: Osteoglossocephala
- Cohort: Osteoglossomorpha; Greenwood, Rosen, Weitzman & Myers, 1966

Orders
- Hiodontiformes; Osteoglossiformes; †Lycopteriformes; and see text

= Osteoglossomorpha =

Osteoglossomorpha Temporal range: Late Jurassic–Recent

Superorder of fishes

Osteoglossomorpha is a superorder of bony fish in the Teleostei.

== Notable members ==
A notable member is the arapaima (Arapaima gigas), the largest freshwater fish in South America and one of the largest bony fishes alive. Other notable members include the bizarre freshwater elephantfishes of family Mormyridae.

== Systematics ==
Most osteoglossomorph lineages are extinct today. Only the somewhat diverse "bone-tongues" (Osteoglossiformes) and two species of mooneyes (Hiodontiformes) remain.

The ichthyodectiform fishes from the Jurassic and Cretaceous periods were once classified as osteoglossomorphs, but are now generally recognized as stem teleosts.

Basal and incertae sedis (Extinct)

- Genus †Coriops Estes, 1969 (possible hiodontid affinities)
- Genus †Harenaichthys Kim et al., 2022
- Genus †Paralycoptera Chang & Chou, 1977
- Genus †Jinanichthys Ma & Sun 1988 [Liaoxiichthys Su 1992]
- Genus †Joffrichthys Li & Wilson 1996 (possibly an osteoglossid)
- Genus ?†Kokuraichthys Yabumoto 2013
- Genus ?†Nierrkunia Su 1992
- Genus ?†Shuleichthys Murray, You & Peng 2010
- Genus ?†Suziichthys Su 1992
- Genus ?†Wilsonichthys Murray, Newbrey, Neumand & Brinkmand 2016
- Family †Jiaohichthyidae Ma 1983
  - Genus †Jiaohichthys Ma 1983
- Family †Kuyangichthidae Liu, Ma & Liu, 1982
  - Genus †Kuyangichthys Liu, Ma & Liu 1982
  - Genus †Pulinia Ma 1983

Order †Lycopteriformes Chang & Chou 1977

- Family †Juiquanichthyidae Ma, 1984
  - Genus †Jiuquanichthys Ma 1984
  - Genus †Changma Ma 1984
  - Genus †Qilianichthys Ma 1984
- Family †Lycopteridae Liu, Su, Huang & Chang, 1963
  - Genus †Aokiichthys Yabumoto 1994
  - Genus †Changichthys Su 1991
  - Genus †Manchurichthys Saito 1936
  - Genus †Neolycoptera Dolgopol de Saez 1939
  - Genus †Pingolepis Chang & Chow 1974
  - Genus †Tongxinichthys Ma 1980
  - Genus †Yixianichthys Wu 2003
  - Genus †Yungkangichthys Chang & Chou 1977
  - Genus †Lycoptera Liu et al. 1963 [Asiatolepis Takai 1944; Sungarichthys Takai 1944]

Order Hiodontiformes McAllister 1968 sensu Taverne 1979

- Genus †Chetungichthys Chang & Chou, 1977
- Genus †Plesiolycoptera Zhang & Zhou 1976
- Genus †Yanbiania Li 1987
- Family Hiodontidae Valenciennes 1846 sensu stricto (mooneyes)
  - Genus †Eohiodon Cavender 1966
  - Genus Hiodon Lesueur 1818

Order Osteoglossiformes Regan 1909 sensu Zhang 2004

- Genus †Lopadichthys Murray, Zelenitsky, Brinkman & Neuman, 2018
- Genus †Tanolepis Jin 1994 [Tanichthys Jin 1991 non Lin 1932]
- Genus †Wilsonichthys Murray, Newbrey, Neuman & Brinkman, 2016
- Genus †Xixiaichthys Zhang 2004
- Family †Huashiidae Chang & Chou, 1977
  - Genus †Kuntulunia Liu, Ma & Liu 1982
  - Genus †Huashia Chang & Chou 1977
- Suborder Pantodontoidei
  - Family Pantodontidae Peters 1876 (freshwater butterflyfishes)
    - Genus Pantodon Peters 1877
- Suborder Osteoglossoidei Regan 1909
  - Genus †Genartina Frizzell & Dante 1965
  - Genus †Monopteros Volta 1796
  - Genus †Musperia Sanders 1934
  - Genus †Phareoides Taverne, 1973
  - Genus †Chauliopareion
  - Family †Brychaetidae Bonde 1966
    - Genus †Brychaetus Woodward 1901
  - Family †Singididae Greenwood & Patterson 1967
    - Genus †Singida Greenwood & Patterson 1967
  - Family Phaerodontidae Jordan 1925a
    - Genus †Phareodusichthys Gayet 1991
    - Genus †Cretophareodus Li 1996
    - Genus †Phareodus Leidy 1873
  - Family Osteoglossidae Bonaparte 1832 sensu lato (arowanas)
- Suborder Notopteroidei Greenwood 1973
  - Family †Ostariostomidae Schaeffer, 1949
    - Genus †Ostariostoma Schaeffer 1949
  - Superfamily Notopteroidea
    - Family †Wakinoichthiidae Yabumoto 1994
      - Genus Wakinoichthys Yabumoto 1994 corrig.
    - Family †Kipalaichthyidae Benveniste 1998
      - Genus †Kipalaichthys Casier 1965
      - Genus †Paradercetis Casier 1965
    - Family Notopteridae Bleeker 1851 (Brown knifefish; featherbacks)
  - Superfamily Mormyroidea
    - Family Gymnarchidae Bleeker 1859 (Aba, African Knifefish)
    - Family Mormyridae Bonaparte 1832 (freshwater elephantfishes)

== Phylogeny ==
Phylogeny based on the following works:

- Osteoglossomorpha
  - Hiodontiformes
    Hiodontidae
  - Osteoglossiformes
    - Pantodontoidei
      Pantodontidae
    - - Osteoglossoidei
        Osteoglossidae
      - Notopteroidei
        - Notopteroidea
          Notopteridae
        - Mormyroidea
          - Gymnarchidae
          - Mormyridae
