= Harenaichthys =

Harenaichthys Temporal range: Late Cretaceous, ~70 Ma

Scientific classification
- Kingdom: Animalia
- Phylum: Chordata
- Class: Actinopterygii
- Order: Osteoglossiformes
- Genus: †Harenaichthys; Kim et al., 2022
- Species: †H. lui

Binomial name
- †Harenaichthys lui Kim et al., 2022

Extinct genus of bony fish

Harenaichthys is an extinct genus of osteoglossiform from the Late Cretaceous of Mongolia. All specimens of the fish have been found in the Nemegt Formation, with the fish also being the only fish known from the formation. It has been suggested that this is due to barriers that freshwater fish have when migrating vertically. Multiple specimens assigned to the genus are fairly complete and articulated, though skull material is not well known. Before the description of the genus, it was believed that the material represented either Lycoptera to a member of Hiodontidae. However, in its description, it was found to be a much more basal member of the group, placing near Joffrichthys. Only one species is assigned to the genus: H. lui.

== History and Classification ==
The earliest that the specimen that would later be assigned to Harenaichthys was referenced in the literature was in a 2009 publication by Paul Sereno and coauthors based on a centrum that was found in association with the holotype of the tyrannosaur Raptorex from the Nemegt Formation. It would be referred to as "cf. Lycoptera" in this initial publication only for a 2011 reanalysis of the specimen of the dinosaur by Danial Fowler and coauthors to argue that the centrum instead belonged to either Ellimmichthyiformes or Hiodontiformes. This was due to the thickness of the walls of the centra along with the presence of fossae that both argue against the assignment to Lycoptera. A more detailed analysis of the specimen by Micheal Newbrey and coauthors in 2013 along with more fish specimens from the same formation would agree with the previous suggestion that the material belonged to a member of Hiodontidae based on comparisons made with material from the Dinosaur Park Formation. Harenaichthys was finally named in a 2022 by Su-Hwan Kim and coauthors based on both the original specimen along with over 50 specimens collected during the Korea-Mongolia International Dinosaur Expedition in 2006-2010. These specimens were found at a number of localities at the same formation, all located in Mongolia. This redescription of the material would not only include isolated centra and small amounts of skull material described in past publications but also a more complete specimen (MPC-f 20/148) that would become the holotype of the genus. The holotype contains not only skull material but also a partially articulated set of abdominal and caudal centrum. Another more complete specimen (MPC-f 20/117) representing an articulated series of abdominal centra with disarticulated ribs and epineurals would also be referred to the genus.

The name Harenaichthys derives from "harena", the Latin word for sand, along with "ichthys" which is the Greek word for fish. The species name 'lui' on the other hand is named in memory of Prof. Junchang Lü, one of paleontologists who elped with the Korea-Mongolia International Dinosaur Expedition.

=== Classification ===
Like the most recent assignment of the material before Harenaichthys was named, the current understanding of the genus places it as a member of Osteoglossomorpha. However, instead of it placing within Hiodontiformes, it is considered to be a very basal member of Osteoglossomorpha close to the genera Joffrichthys and Xixiaichthys. This placement largely comes from the anatomy of the centra and the presence of seven hypurals in the caudal fin of the fish. Below is the phylogenic analysis from the 2022 description of the genus.

- - Amia
  - - Elops
    - Lycoptera
    - - - Paralycoptera
        - Tanolepis
    - - - - Shuleichthys
          - Wilsonichthys
        - - Eohiodon
          - Hiodon
      - - Ostariostoma
        - Lopadichthys colwellae
        - - - Ellimmichthyiformes
            - Clupeiformes
        - - - Harenaichthys lui
            - - Xixiaichthys
              - - Joffrichthys symmetropterus
                - Joffrichthys tanyourus
          - - - Notopteridae
              - - Palaeonotopterus
                - Mormyroidea
            - - Chauliopareion
              - - - Singida
                  - Pantodon
                - - - Osteoglossum
                    - Scleropages
                  - - Phareodus
                    - - Arapaima
                      - Heterotis
                      - Sinoglossus

== Description ==
=== Skull ===
Not much of the skull of Harenaichthys is known with the only three bones assigned to the genus being from the jaws. The only part of the upper jaw known is the premaxilla which is incomplete, lacking the posterior region of the bone. It is a shallow bone that swells at the front one to two-thirds of the length. The lower jaw is known from slightly more complete remains, with specimens preserving the dentary and quadrate of the fish, both decently well preserved. The dentary bones of the fish would have curved inwards to form a symphysis. Two rows of foramina, one being a row of six nutrient foramina and below it is a row located at the mandibular sensory canal which contains seven foramina. The quadrate preserves the condyle which is long and extends upwards at a 90° angle from the anterior surface of the bone. Though broken off, the shape of the posteroventral process would have most likely had a deep notch in between the ventral margin and posteroventral process of the bone. The presence of teeth is preserved on both the upper and lower jaws with only the teeth themselves being preserved on the upper jaw. They are arranged in two rows on both the upper and lower jaws though the rows fuse towards the back of the dentary.

=== Postcranium ===
Most of the material known from Harenaichthys is made up of vertebrae, mostly isolated. The first vertebrae of the column, the atlas, differs from other vertebrae of the animal due to the occipital joint being made up of three parts. These include two exoccipital facets that are rounded protrude forwards from the bone. The third facet, the basioccipital facet, is located near the bottom of the bone and is more concave. The parapophyses of the atlas are weakly developed and there are a number of foramina between them. The abdominal centra are mainly different from other centra in the column due to the fact that the neural and haemal arches are autogenous from the centrum itself. Along with this, the centra are concave at the front and back with the notochord being positioned at the center of the bone. The pleural ribs are weakly articulated with the centra behind the fused parapophyses, the ribs themselves are flat from front to back. The exact anatomy of the abdominal centra differ from front to back with the posterior vertebrae being slightly longer than the anterior ones. The anterior vertebrae also have shorter and less robust parapophyses, with these vertebrae lacking the septum of bone present in front of and behind the parapophyses of the posterior abdominal centra. Unlike in the abdominal centra, the neural and haemal arches are fused to the centra.

The no fin material is known from Harenaichthys though the bones of the caudal skeleton are. The caudal skeleton is made up of two preural and five ural centra. The first two ural centra are separate from other another both possess hypural facets. Though the third and forth centra also have hypural facets, these two bones are fused unlike what was seen in the previous two. The fifth ural centra is fused with the fifth hypural, both of these bones being in contact with the sixth hypural.

== Paleobiology ==
One of the more important features of Harenaichthys is the composition of the sites that it has been found in, with all sites only containing the single fish species. This is noted as strange by the authors due to the fact that the dentition shows that the diet of the fish with largely made up of other fish. The authors of the 2022 publication suggest that this is due to the an altitude barrier caused by tectonic events taking place in Mongolia at the time. Altitude is a noted cause of low diversity in freshwater ecosystems today due to the difficulty of making vertical migrations. Along with this, the authors also suggest that lower water temperatures could have played an extra role into the low fish diversity at Nemegt. Pathologies associated with both ages and diseases have been found on some vertebrae attributed to Harenaichthys.
