= Paleozoological Museum of China =

Coordinates: 39°56′11″N 116°19′40″E

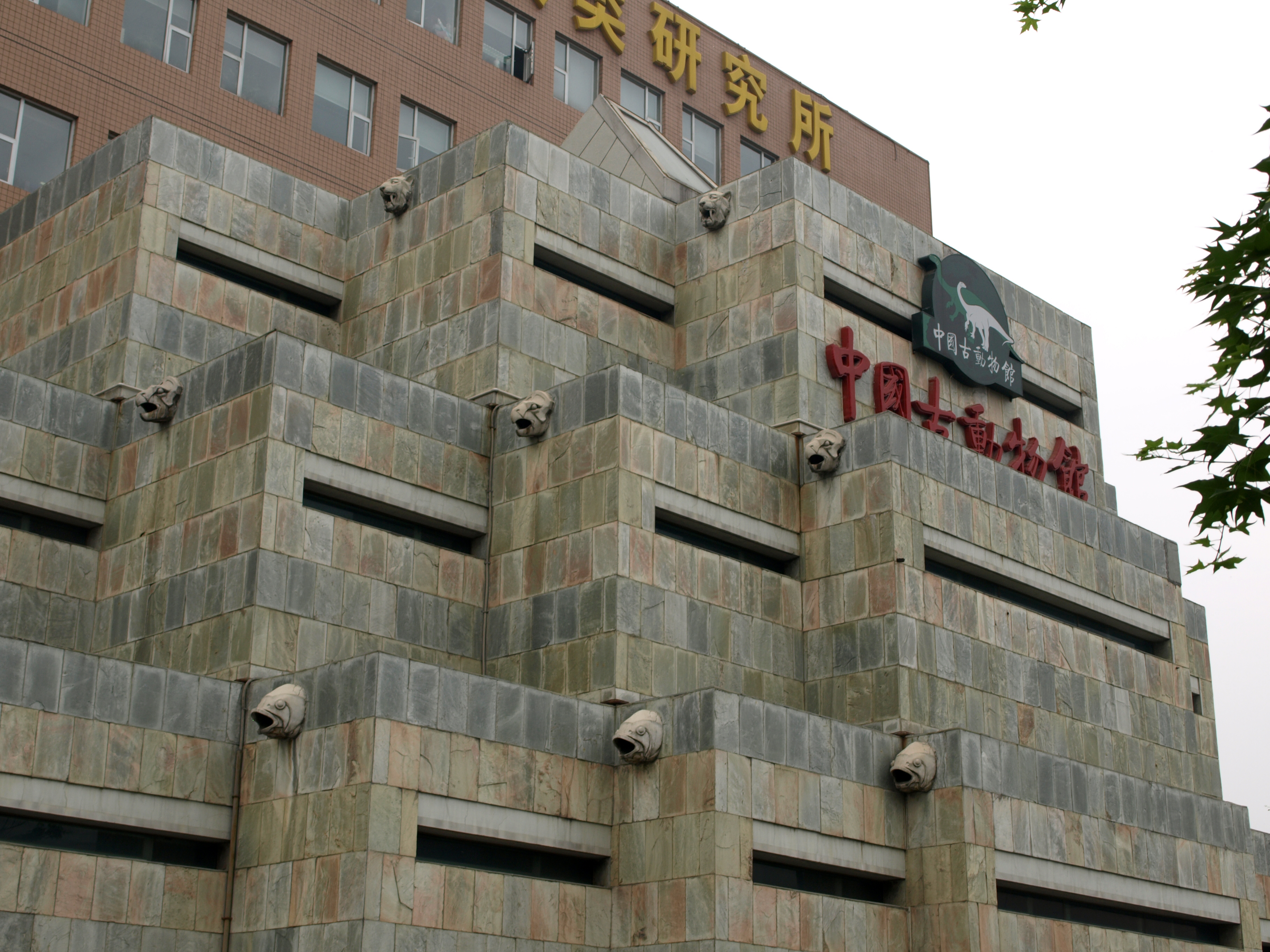
- Former name: Shu-hua Museum of Paleoanthropology, Museum of Vertebrate Paleontology
- Established: 1929
- Location: 142 Xi-Zhi-Men-Wai Street, Beijing 100044, China
- Type: Paleontology Museum
- Director: Wang Yuan
- Website: www.paleozoo.cn

The Paleozoological Museum of China (PMC; Chinese: 中国古动物馆) is a museum in Beijing, China. The same building also houses the Institute of Vertebrate Paleontology and Paleoanthropology of the Chinese Academy of Sciences. The museum contains exhibition halls with specimens aimed at the public, while the rest of the building is used for research purposes.

== Building ==
The main building consists of three floors, with the first floor displaying a number of fish and amphibian fossils, along with many Mesozoic reptiles, while reptiles and birds are represented on the second floor, and mammals (including examples of megafauna like Stegodon) on the third floor. Many of the fossil specimens on display are of extinct animals examples of which have only been found within the boundaries of modern-day China, such as Sinokannemeyeria. It also has several examples of the evolutionary precursors to birds, including the holotypes of Confuciusornis and Microraptor, found on field expeditions to Liaoning. An adjoining gallery to the main floor looks at the origins of man, including information on Peking Man (an example of Homo erectus), discovered in nearby Zhoukoudian (Choukoutien) during excavations in 1923-27. It also contains a number of stone tools used by paleolithic peoples, and examples of other, later fossil skulls from early hominids who once inhabited the area. There are life-sized models depicting what the inhabitants probably looked like at that time. In another gallery on the main floor, there are special temporary exhibits. The museum underwent a renovation in 2014.

== First Floor ==
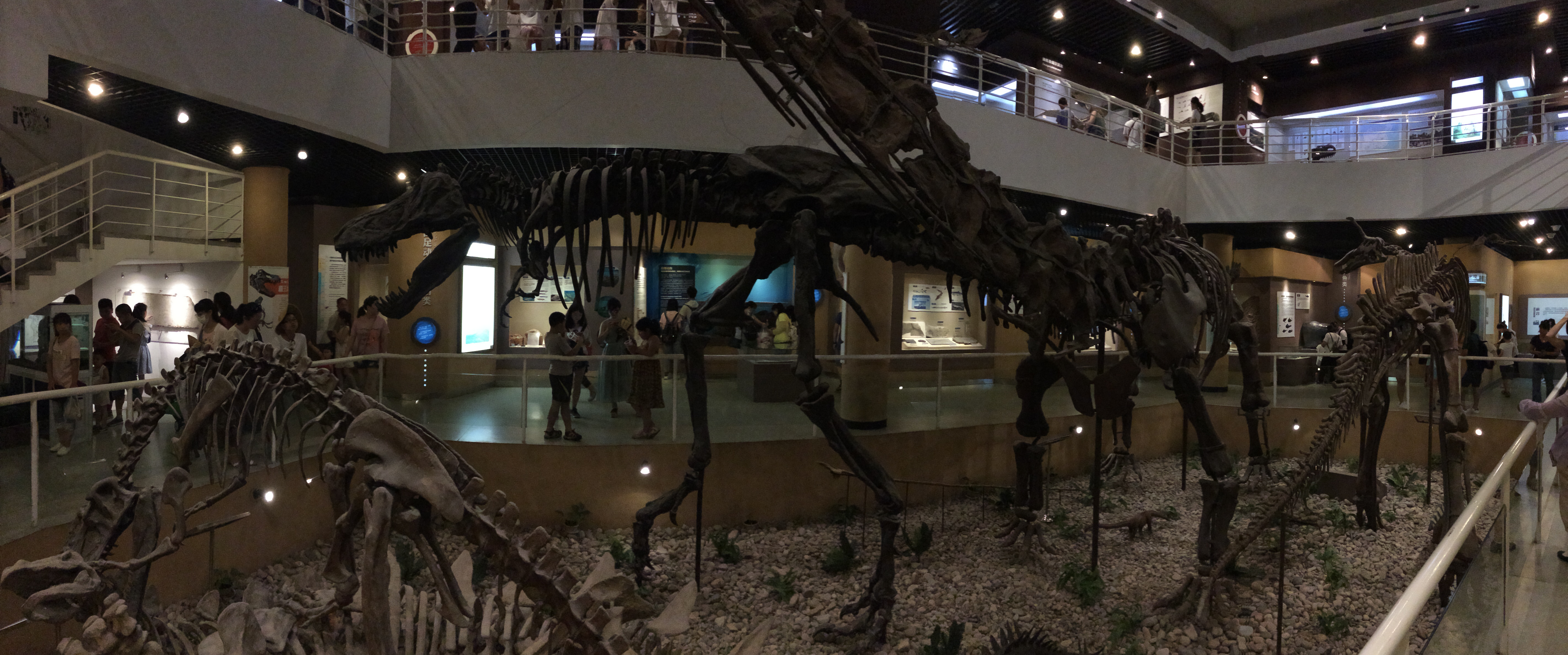
The first floor of the Paleozoological Museum of China.

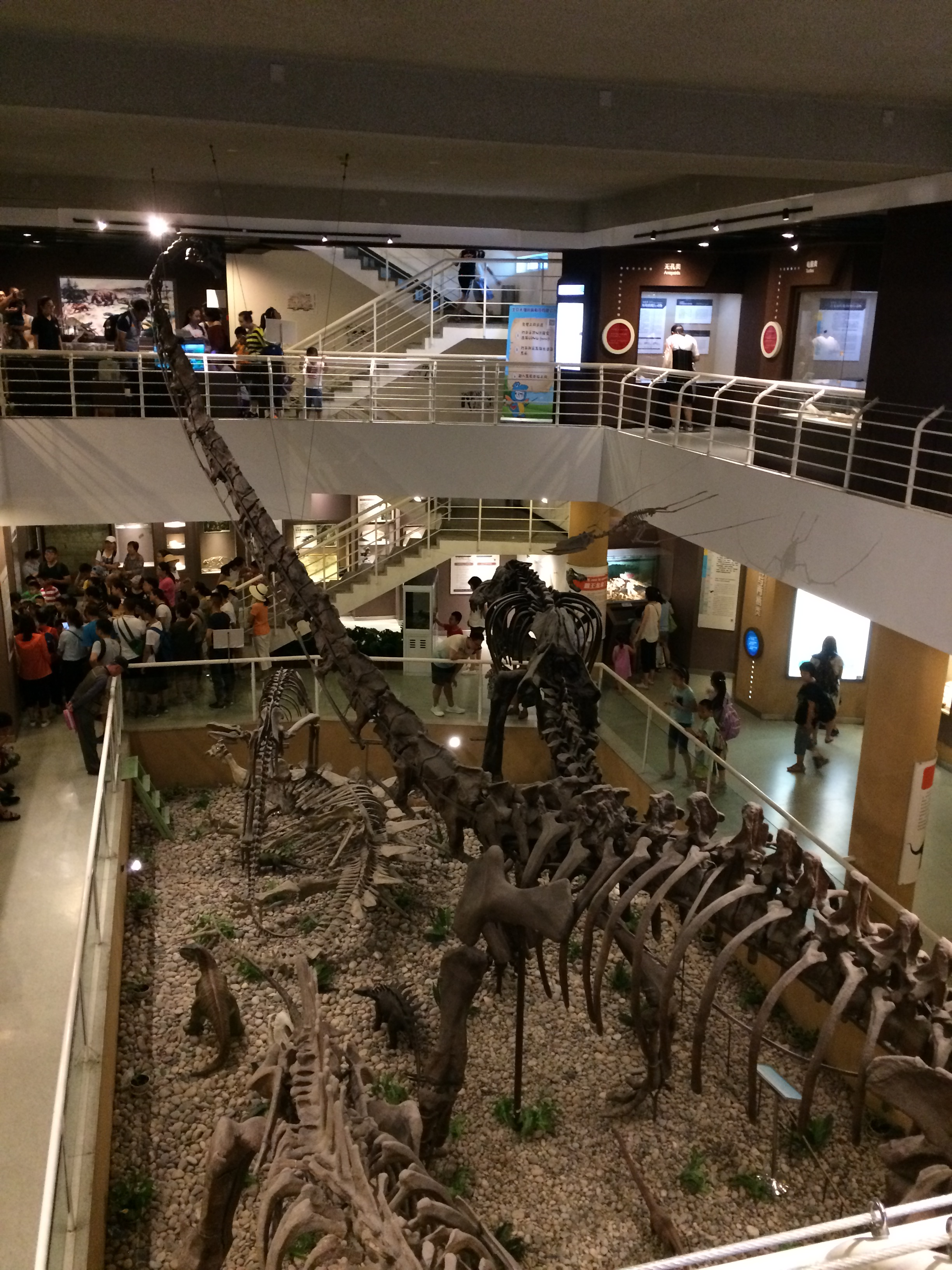
The first floor viewed from the second floor.

The first floor of the museum contains a space for temporary exhibitions, the gift shop, a theater, and the exhibition space for a sub-museum of the Institute of Vertebrate Paleontology and Paleoanthropology, called the Shu-hua Museum of Paleoanthropology. It also contains the first floor of the main exhibition area, belonging to the other sub-museum of the IVPP, the Museum of Vertebrate Paleontology. The exhibition belonging to the Shu-hua Museum details the origins of man in China. Multiple casts of the skulls of early hominidae, which were discovered in Zhoukoudian, are displayed. A bronze bust of Peking Man is also on display. A small diorama of Homo erectus making fire is installed in a glass case.

== Museum of Vertebrate Paleontology ==
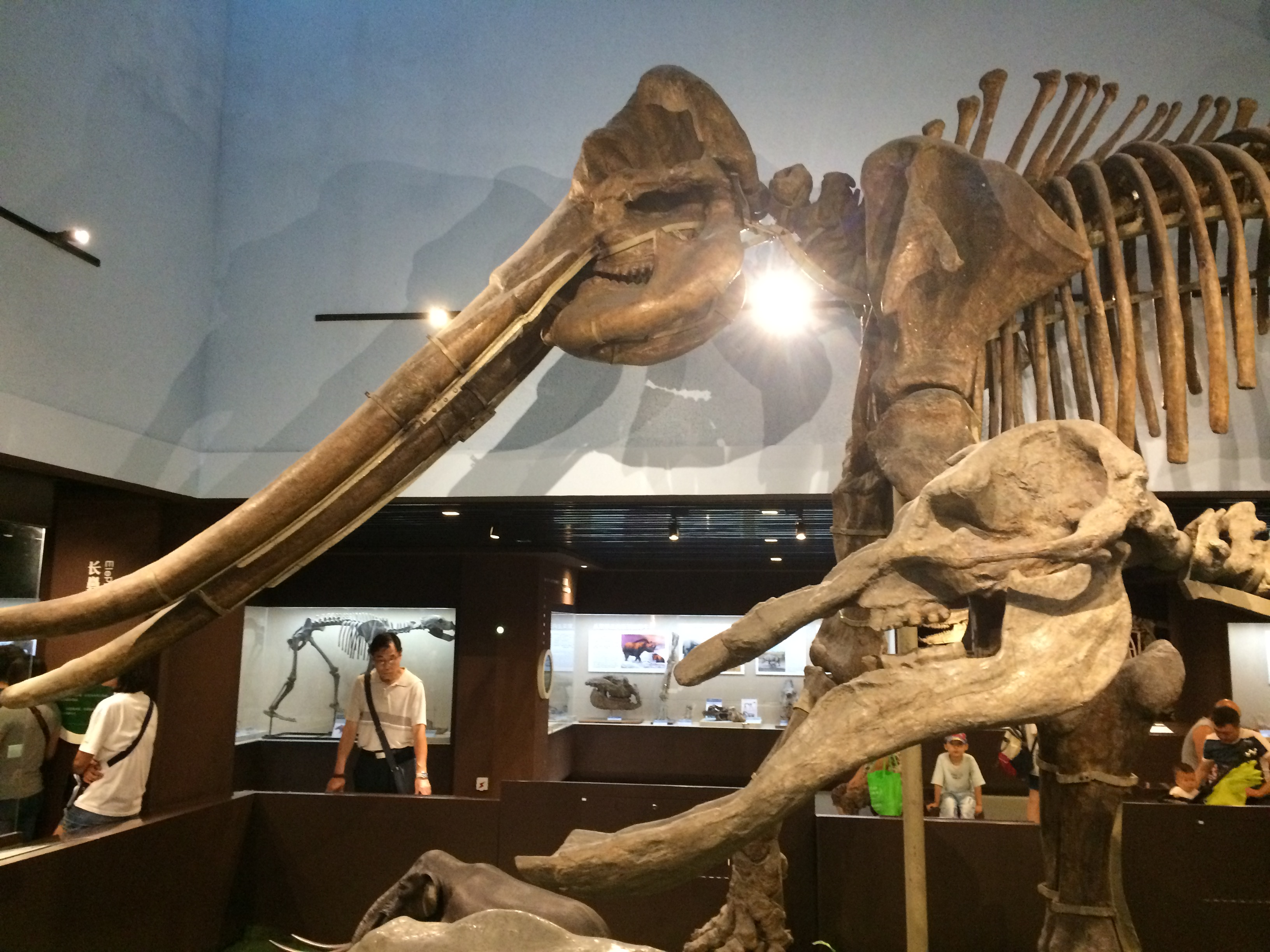
The Cenozoic gallery on the third floor.

The first floor of the exhibition area focuses on fish, amphibians, and Mesozoic reptiles. The centerpiece of the floor is a large installation displaying mounts of Tsintaosaurus, Mamenchisaurus, Tyrannosaurus, and a Monolophosaurus preying on a Tuojiangosaurus. Near the entrance of the exhibit, a collection of Cambrian fossils from Southern China are displayed. A model of a Dunkleosteus head is also installed. Further in the gallery, along with fossils of prehistoric fish such as Sinohelicoprion and Helicoprion, a preserved coelacanth from South Africa, Latimeria, is displayed in a glass case. At the other end of the exhibit, the displays focus on prehistoric flight. The holotype specimen of Microraptor is displayed on the wall, and multiple specimens of pterosaurs are installed along with crushed specimens of other reptiles, such as Hyphalosaurus. On the second floor, the exhibit fully focuses on Mesozoic life, starting with a mount of Sinokannemeyeria next to displays of other dicynodonts, like Lystrosaurus. The exhibit then focuses on dinosaurs, installing mounts of Archaeornithomimus, Probactrosaurus, and the designate museum treasure of the IVPP, a Lufengosaurus skeleton that was the first dinosaur fossil found in China. In display cases, fossils of Mamenchisaurus and Tienshanosaurus are set. Further in the second floor, a section of the exhibit is dedicated to dinosaur eggs. The gallery also displays many fossils with preserved feathers from Liaoning, including a composite fossil dubbed "Archaeoraptor". The floor also mounts a cast of a Shansisuchus along with the skull and neck of Vjushkovisaurus. The third floor focuses on Cenozoic mammals, with an installation of mounts of Stegodon and Platybelodon along with the skull of a woolly mammoth as the gallery's centerpiece. A mount of Rhinotitan is also displayed.

== Collection ==
The collection is significant as it contains many holotypes that were used in scientific journals to describe a number of ancient extinct lines of creatures unique to China. It has an active research facility, and its personnel include the famed Chinese paleontologist Xu Xing, who has named and described many dinosaurs and other fossil animals, some examples of which are on display at the museum.

== Gallery ==
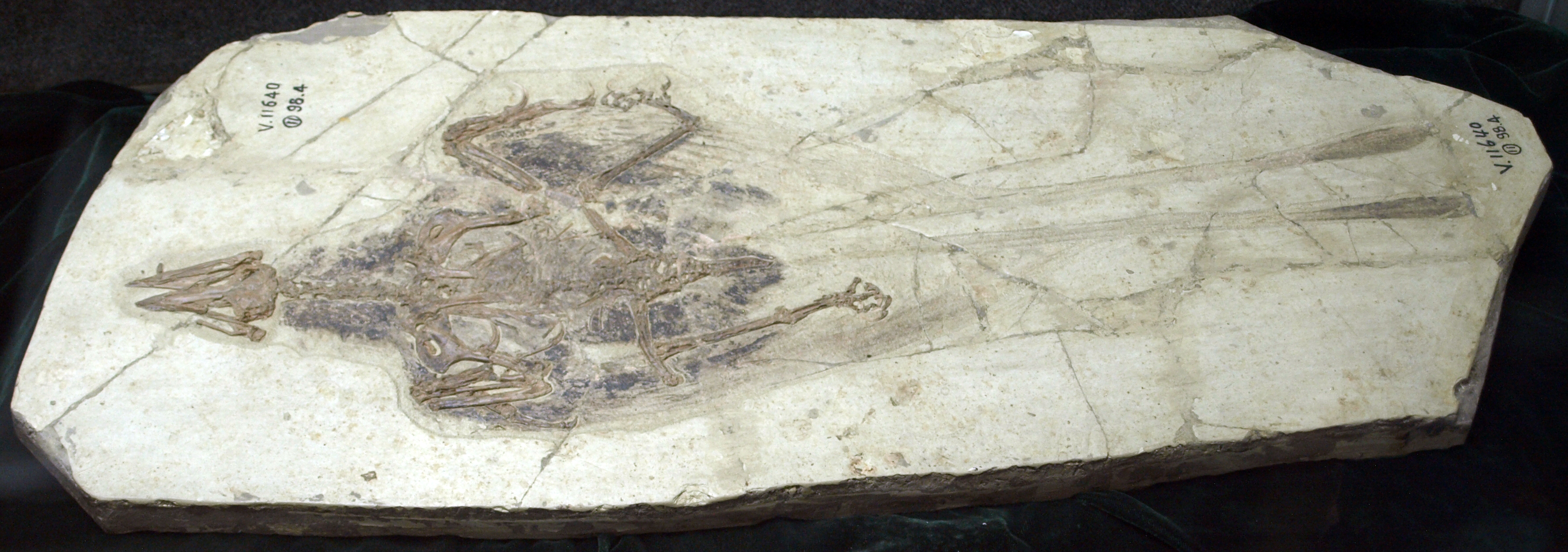
A specimen of Confuciusornis sanctus on display at the museum.

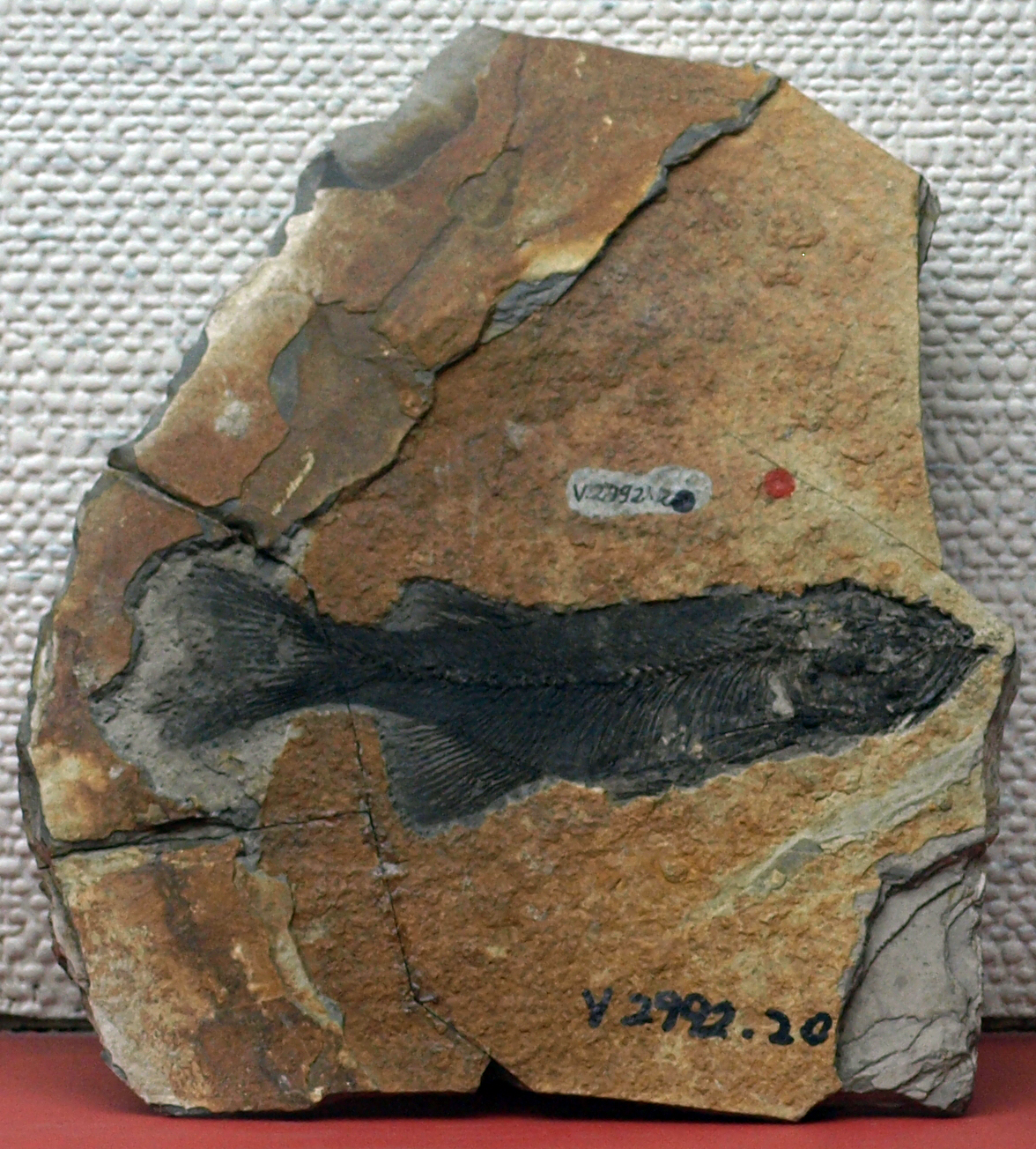
A specimen of Paralycoptera wui on display at the museum.

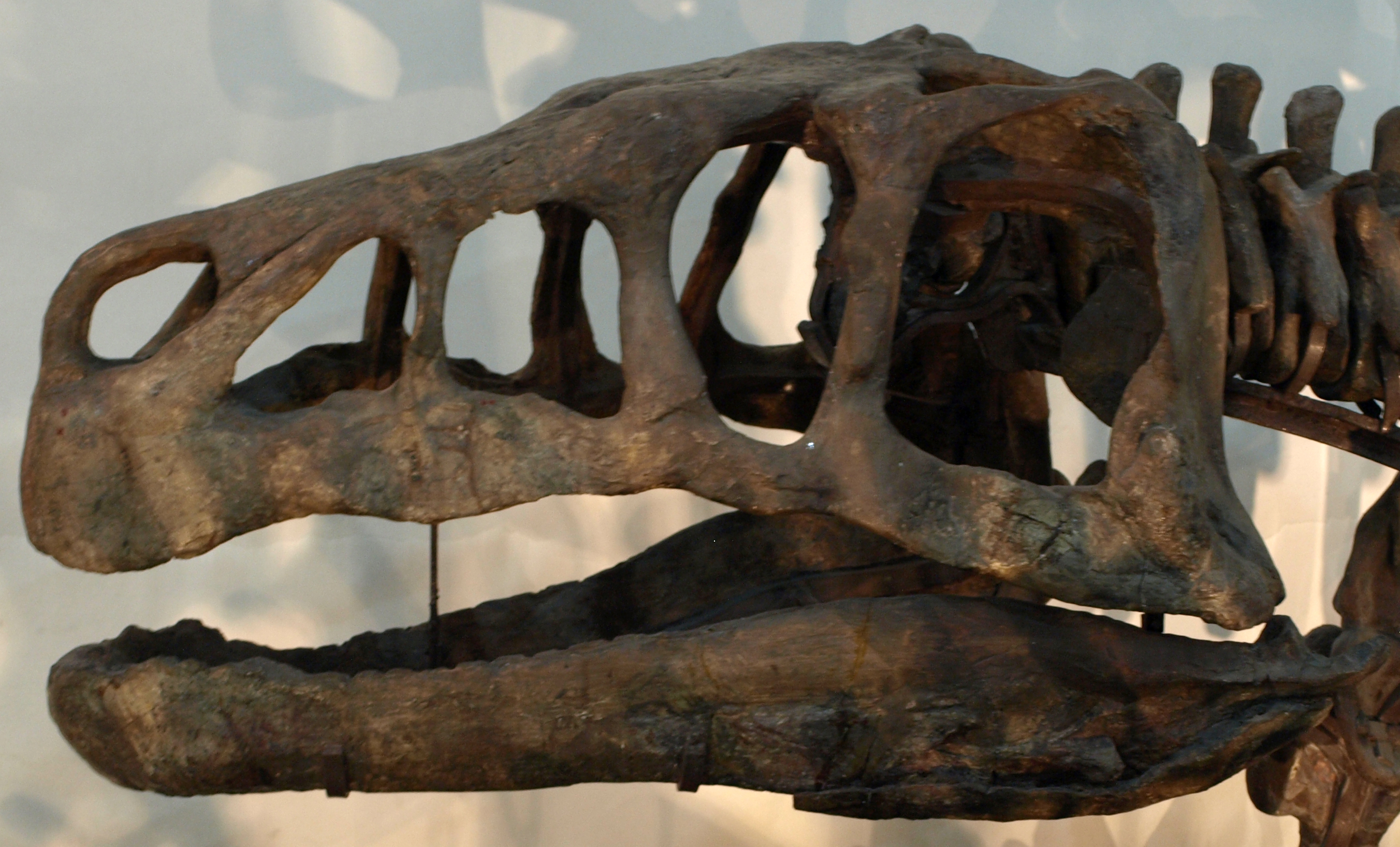
Skull of Shansisuchus on display at the museum.

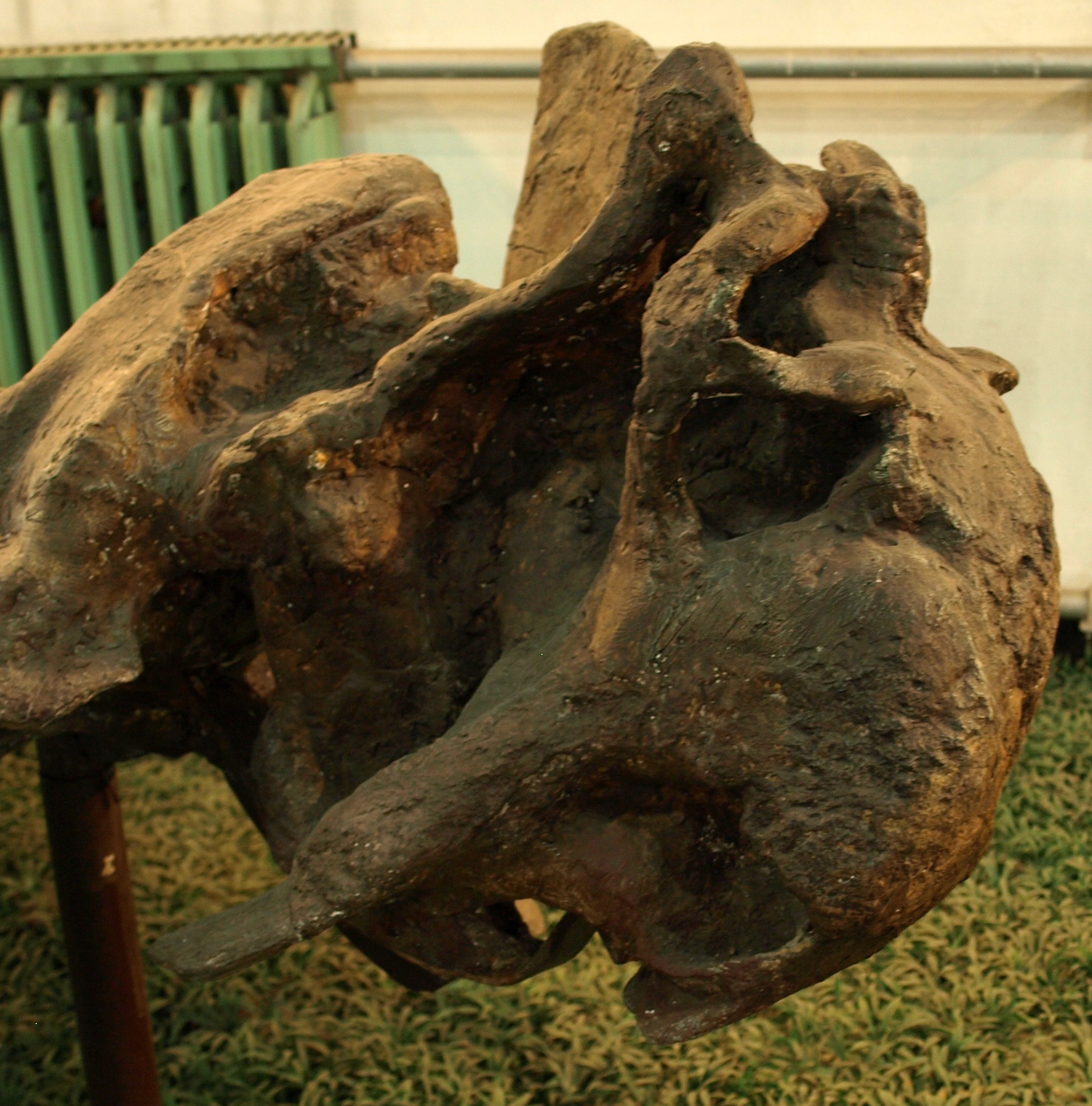
A specimen of Parakannemeyeria youngi on display at the museum.

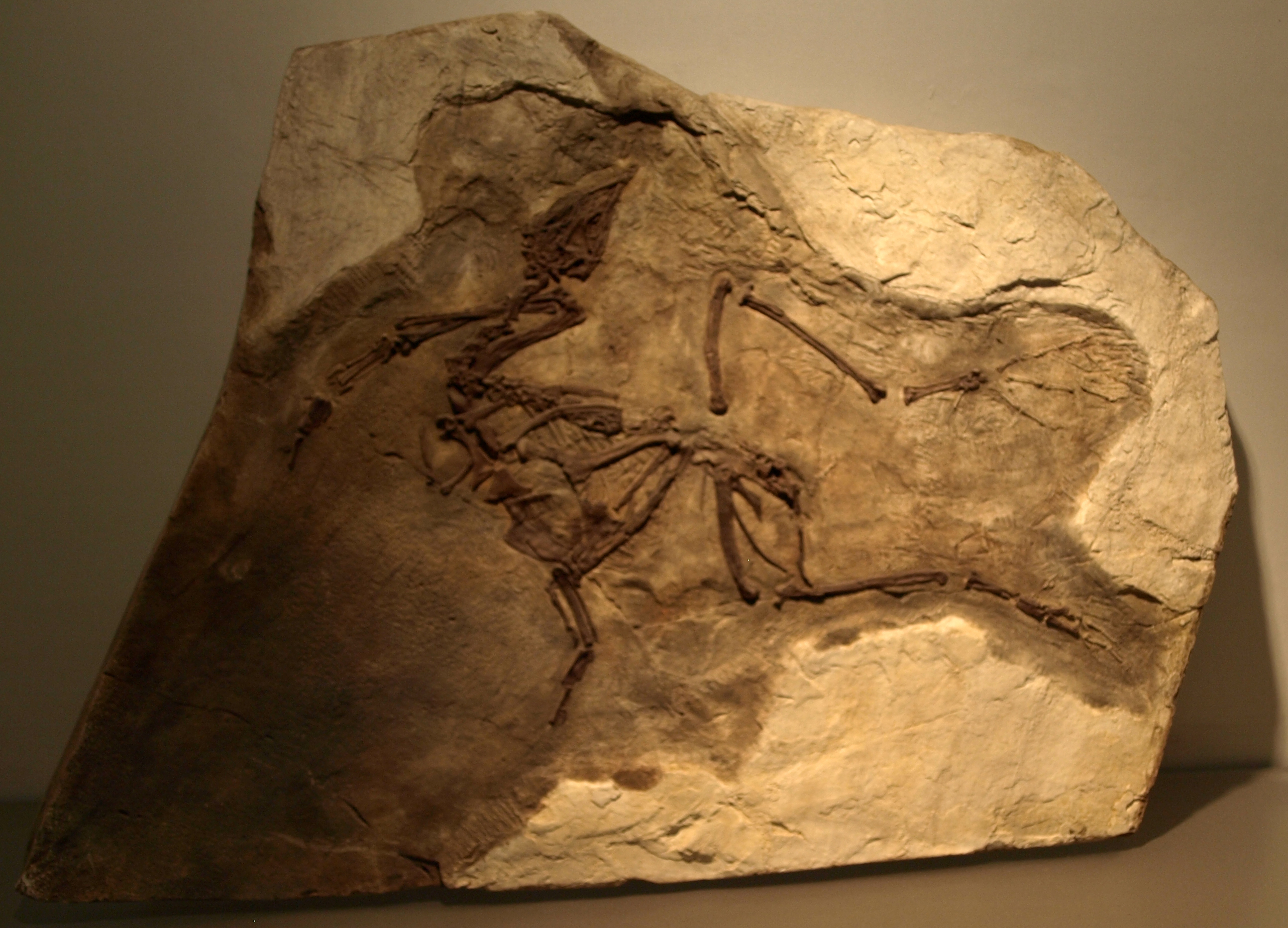
Fossil specimen of Yixianornis Grabaui on display at the museum.

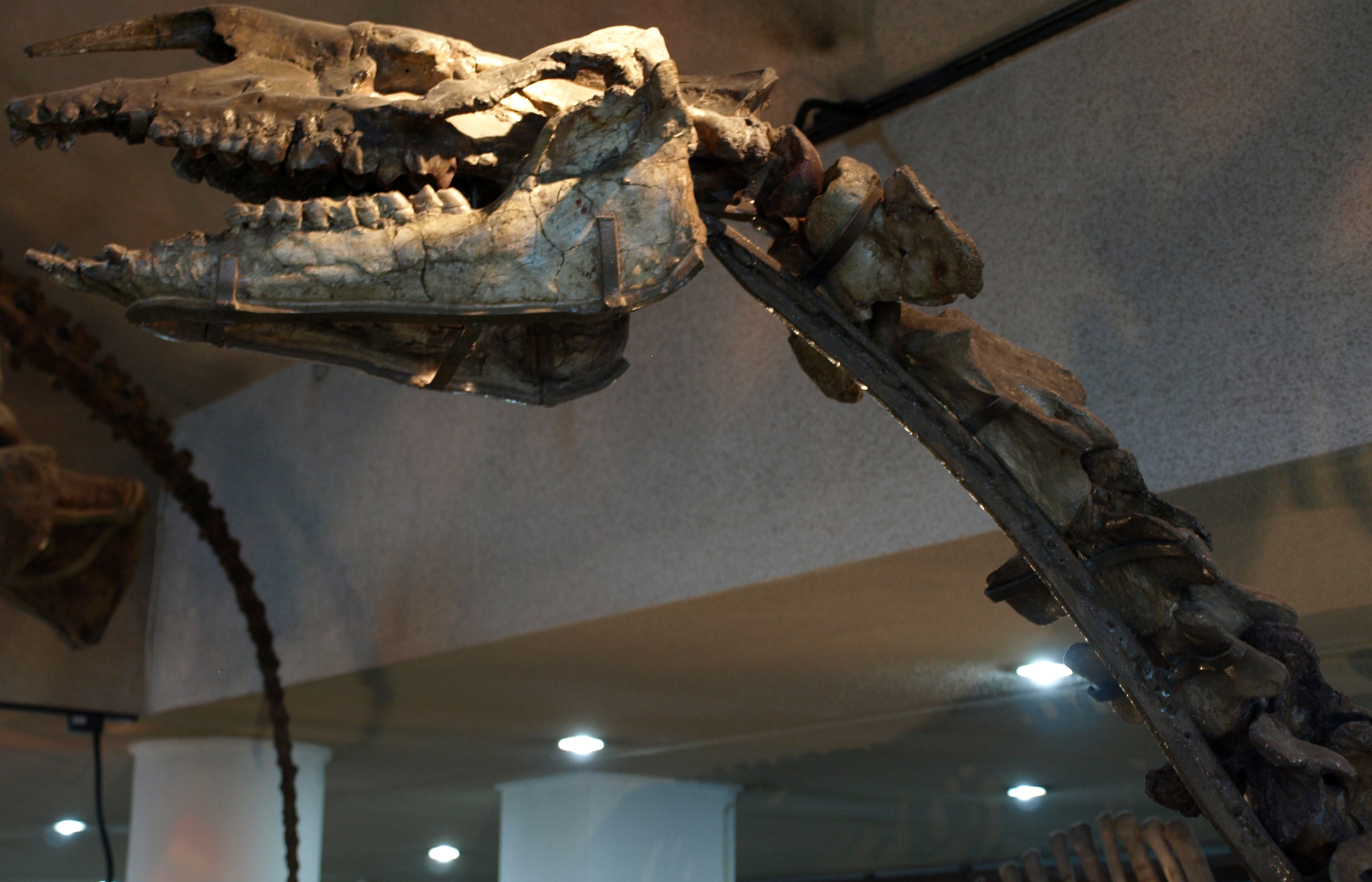
A mounted specimen of Juxia Sharamurenense on display at the museum.

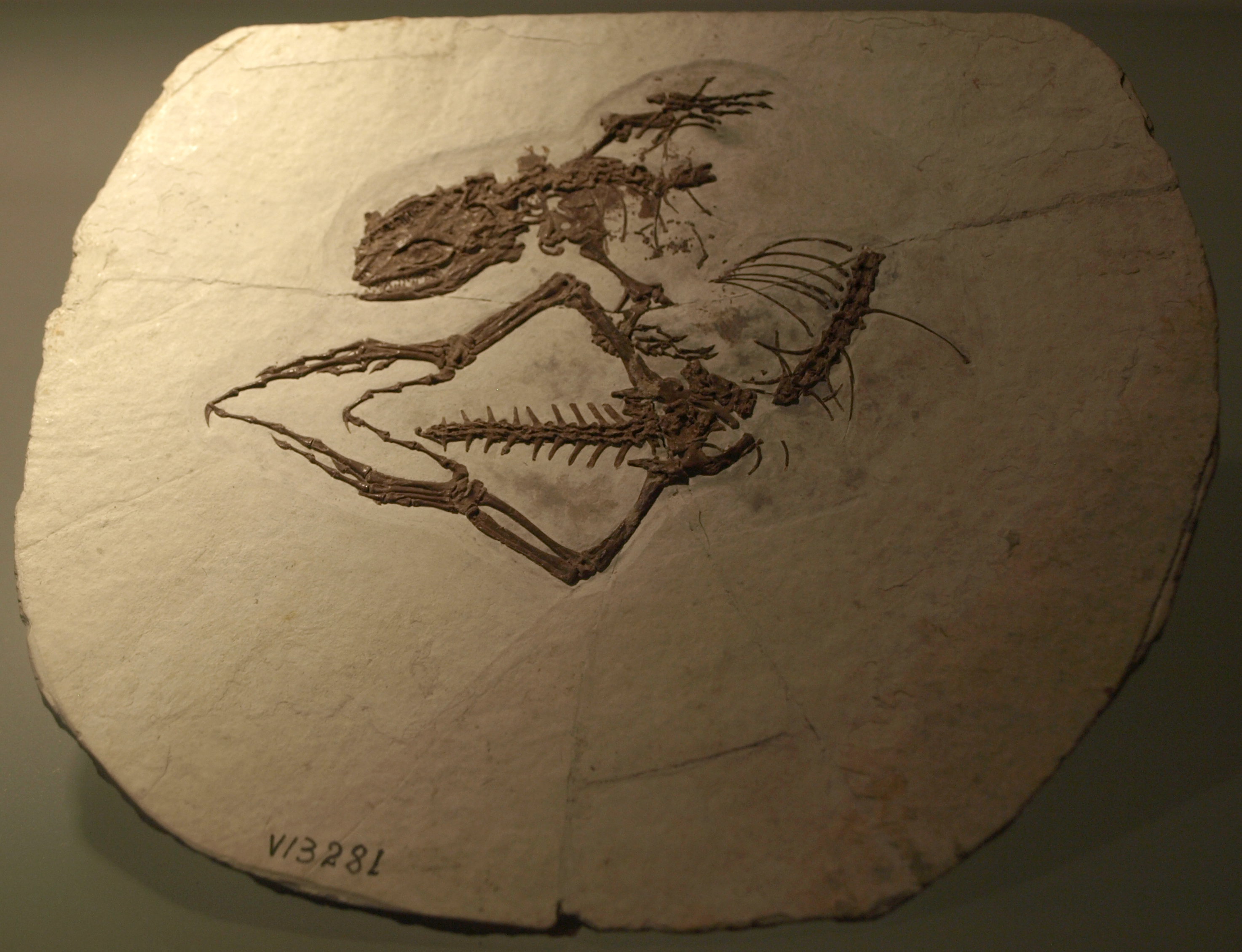
A specimen of Dalinghosaurus longidigitus, on display at the museum.

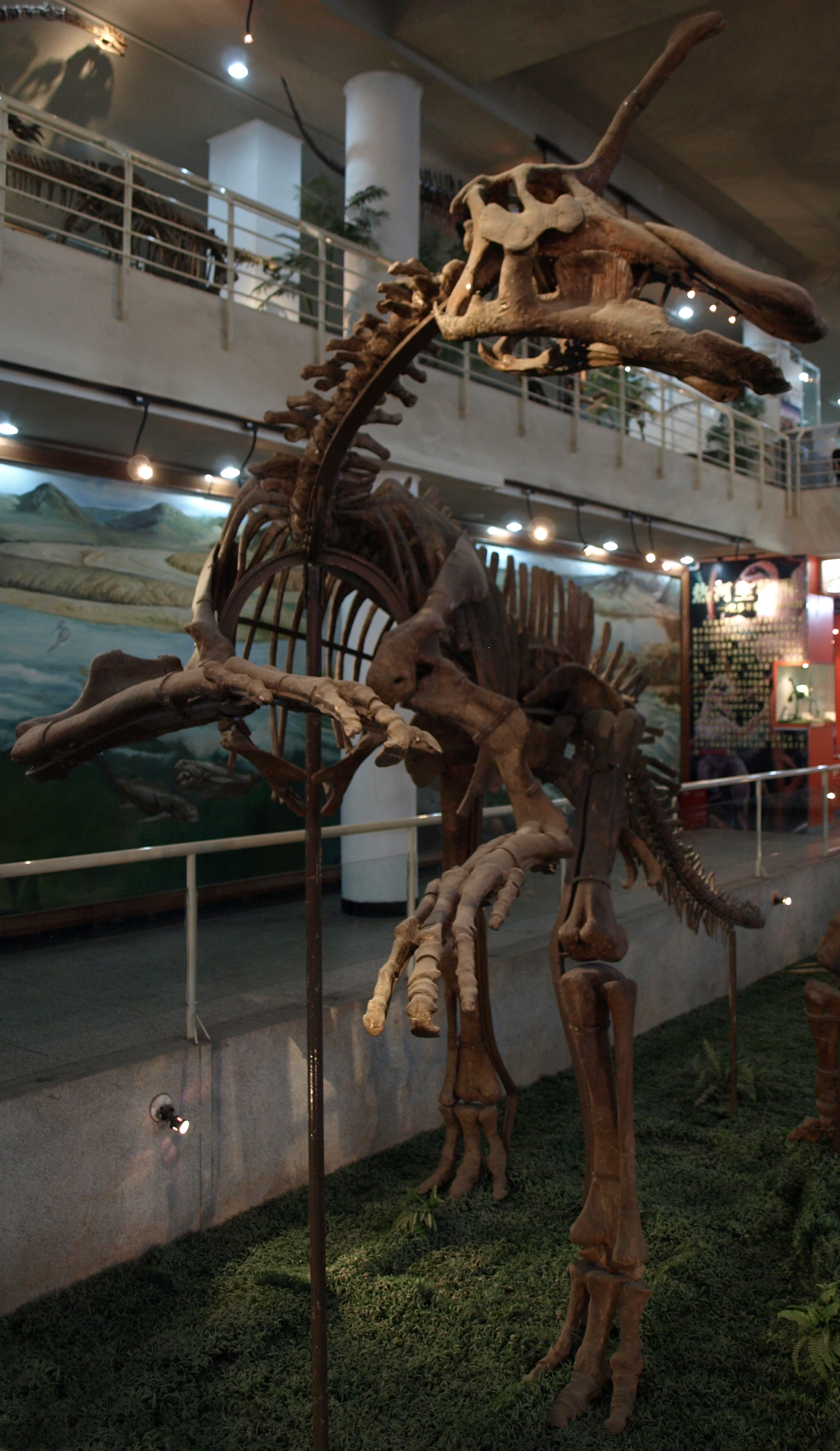
Tsintaosaurus skeleton.

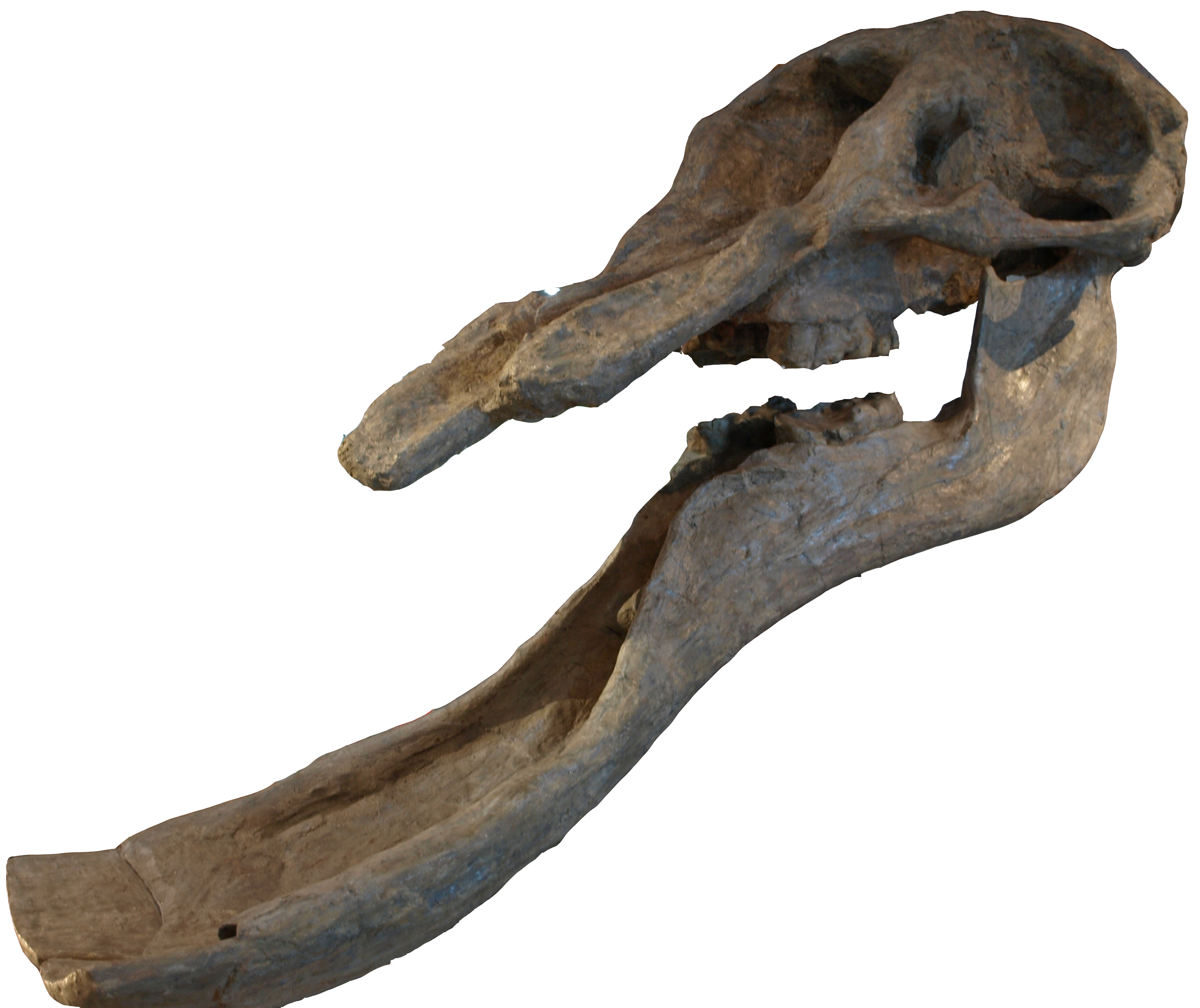
Platybelodon skull.

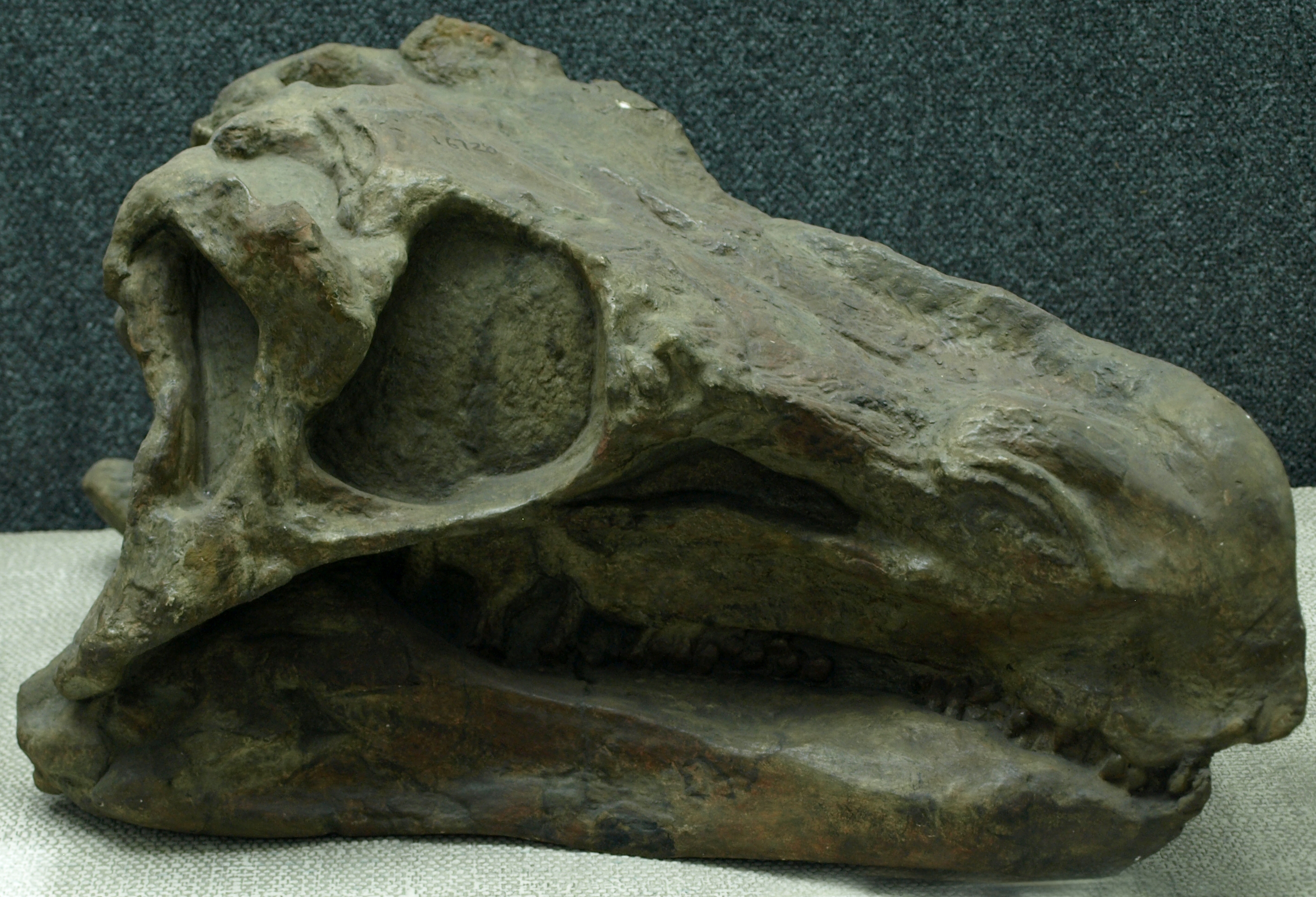
Huayangosaurus skull.

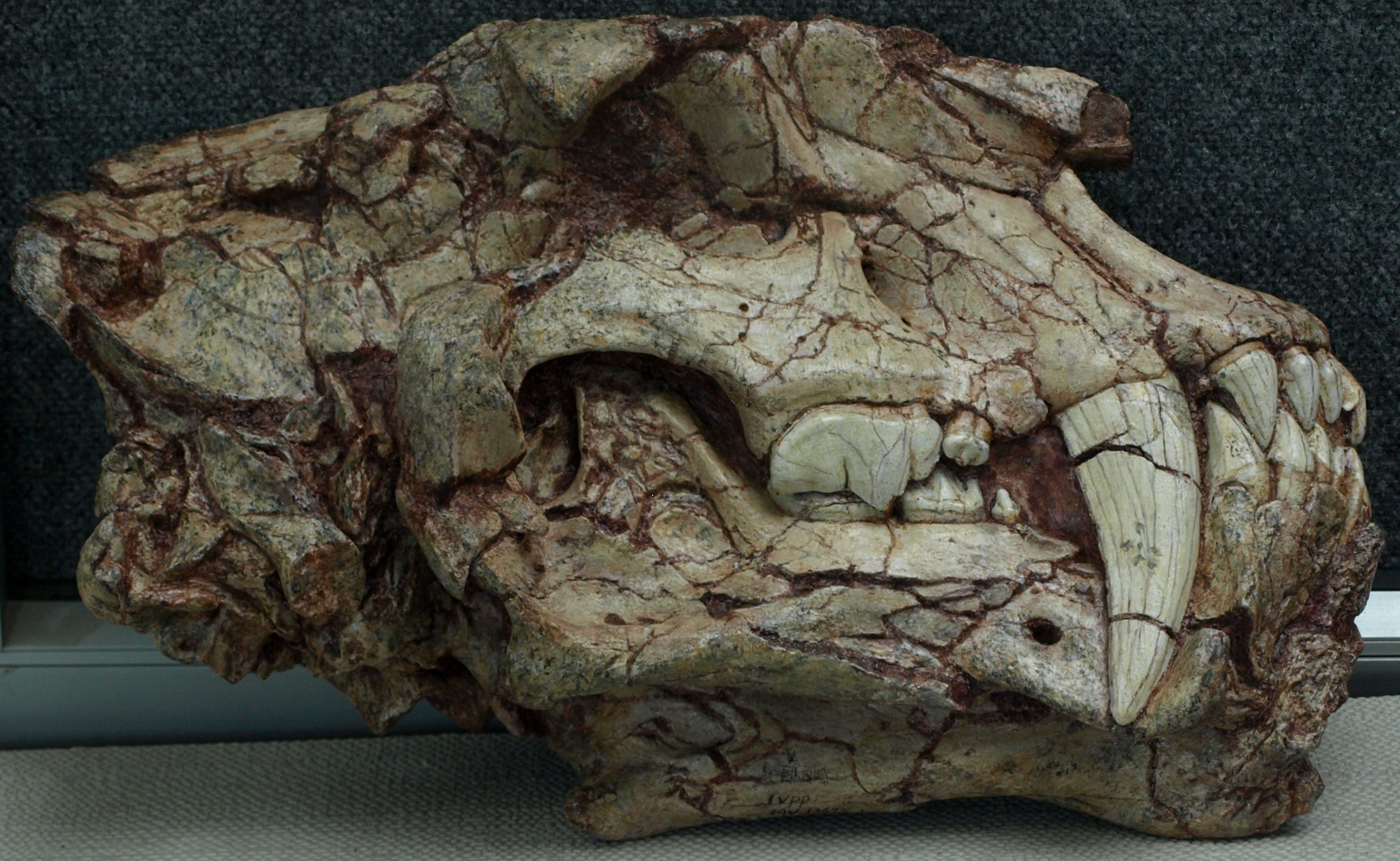
Homotherium skull.

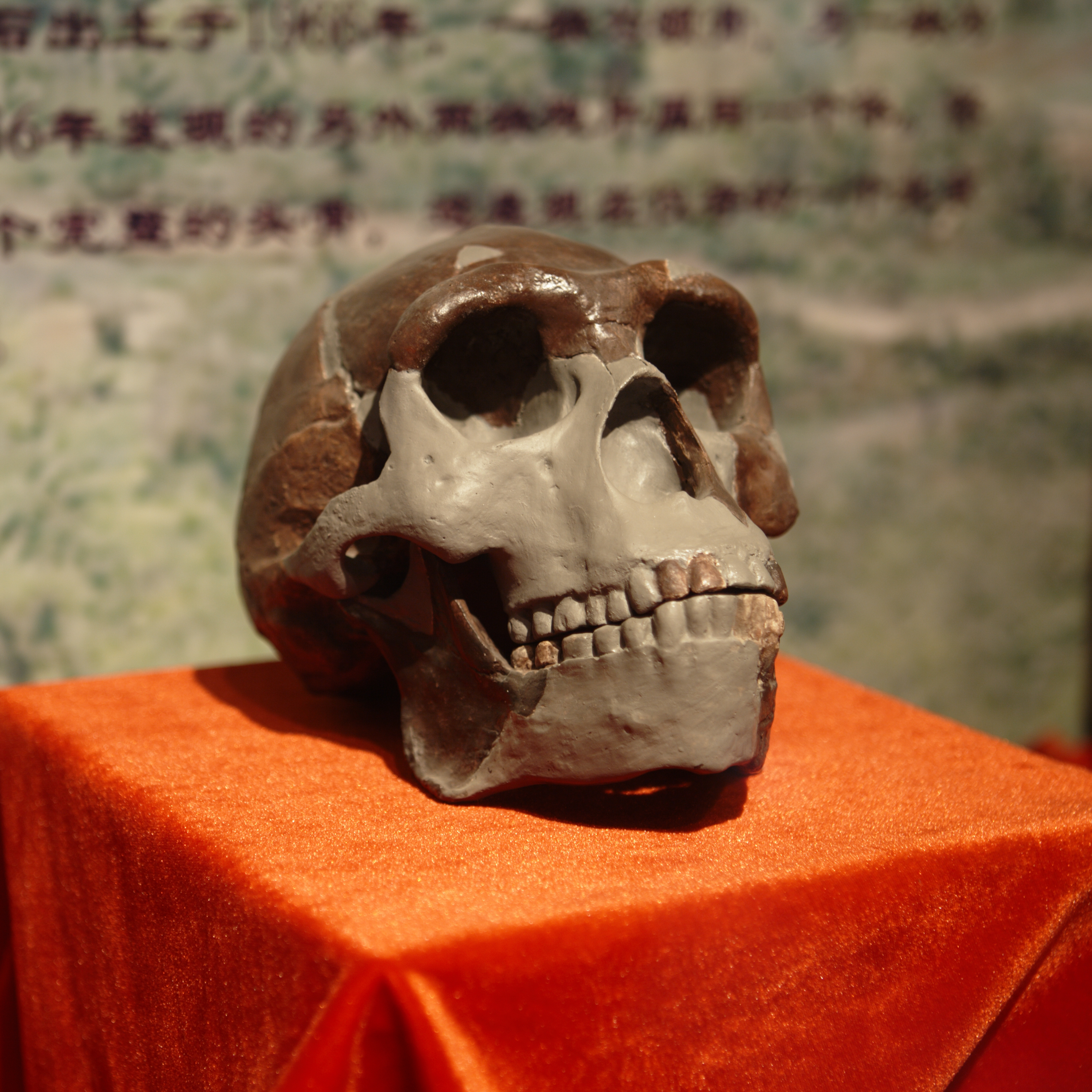
Peking Man skull (replica).

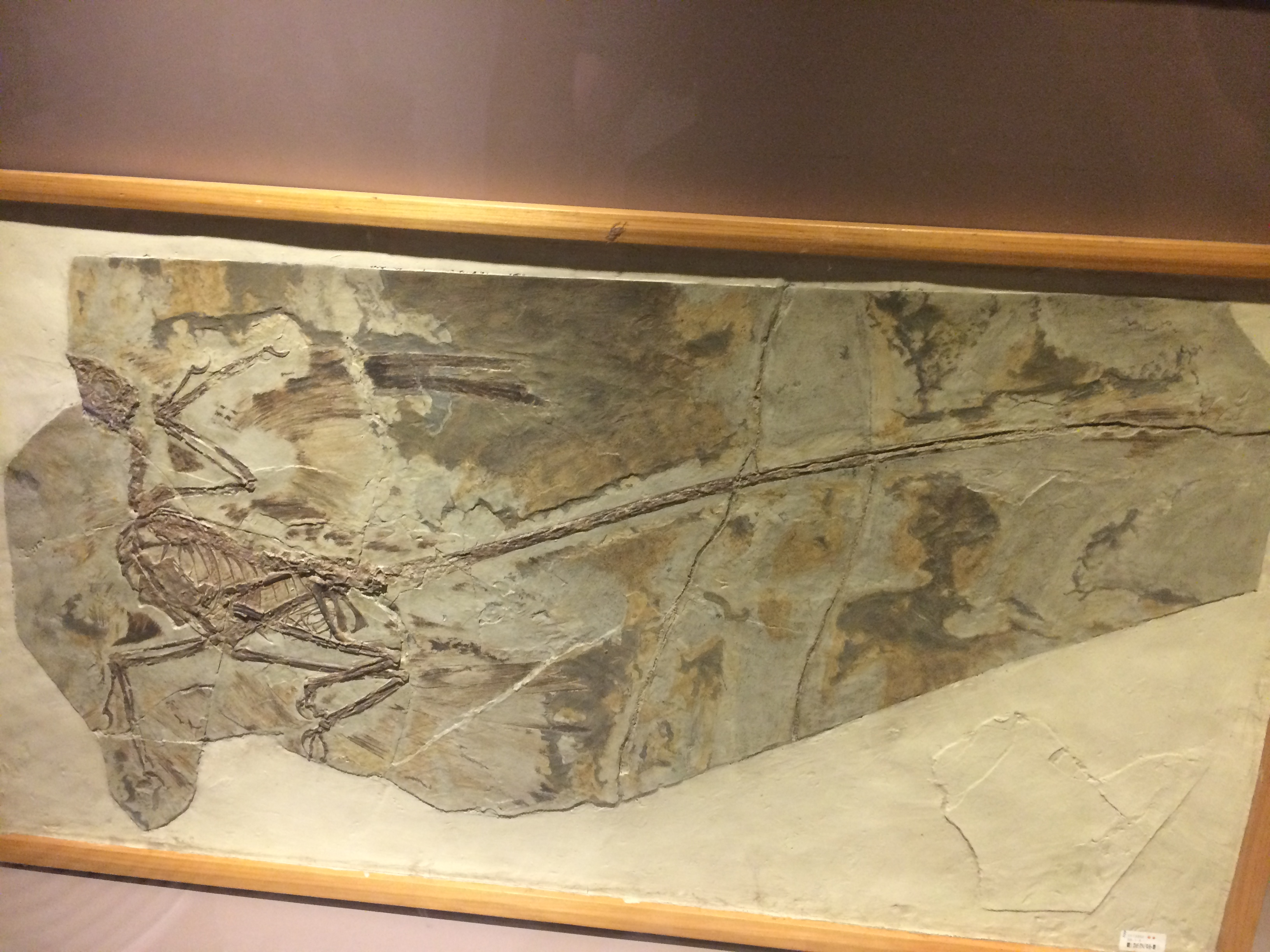
The holotype of Microraptor on display at the museum.

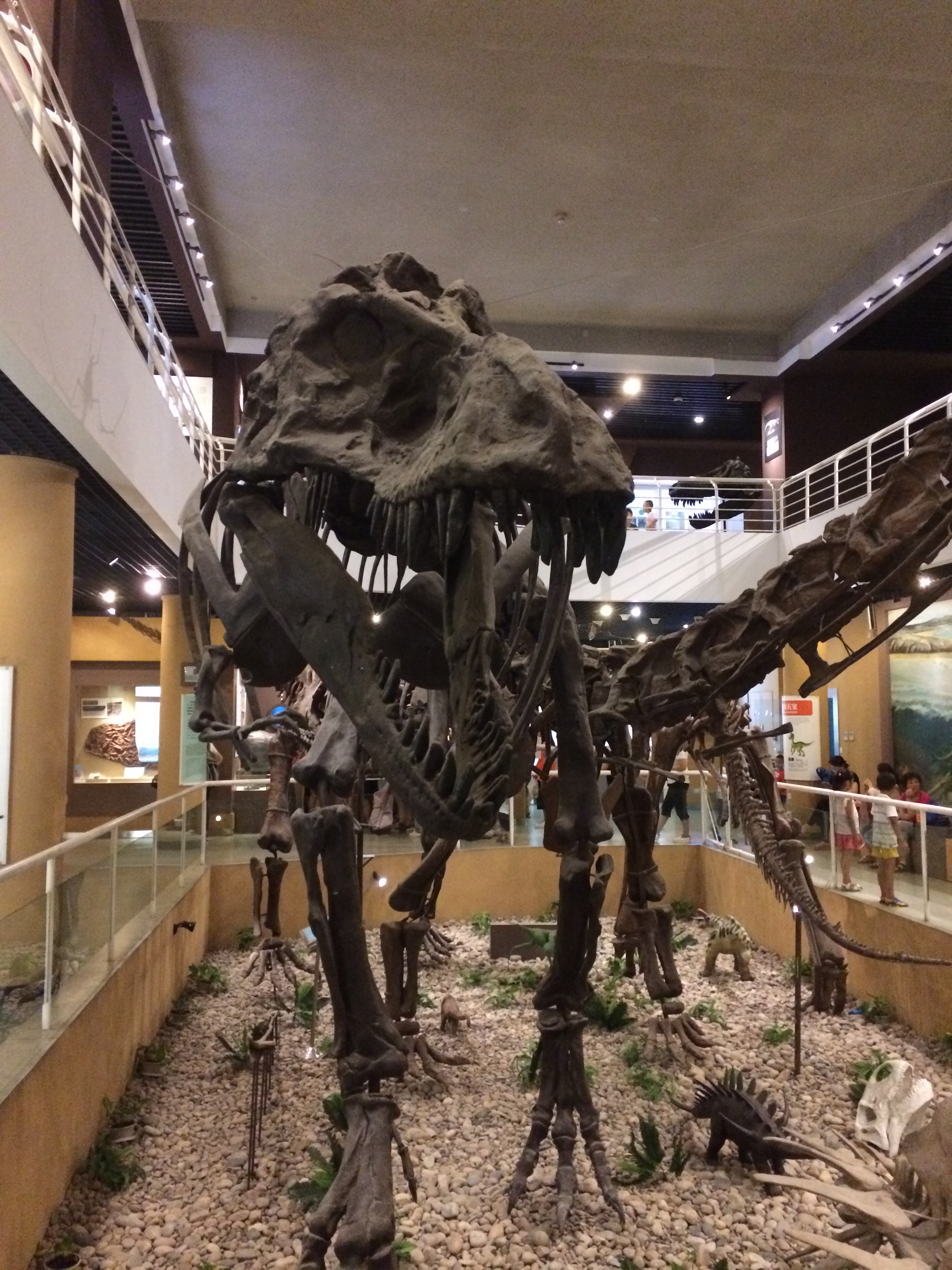
A mounted cast of Tyrannosaurus specimen RTMP 81.6.1(Black Beauty), on the first floor of the museum.

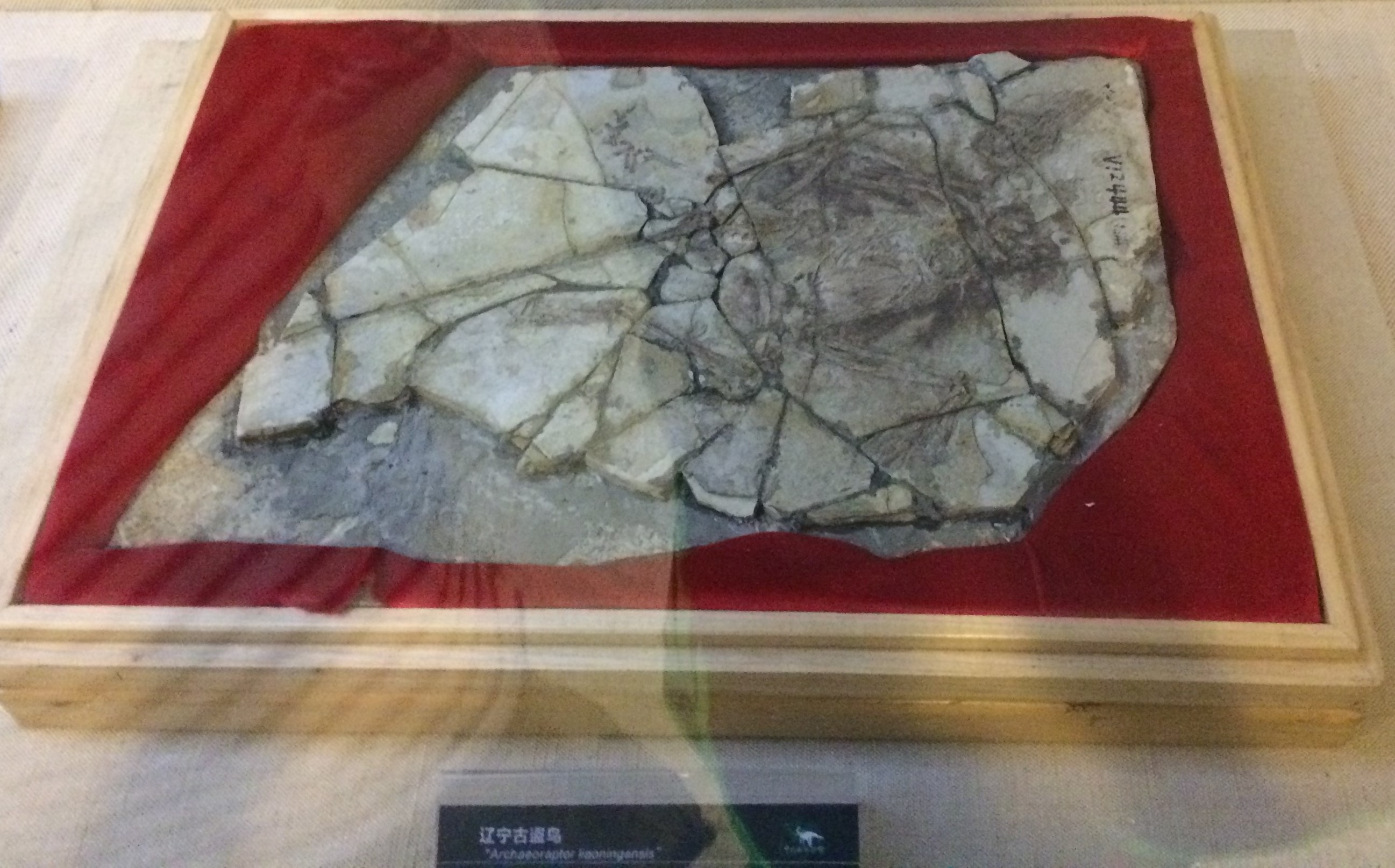
A composite fossil which generated much controversy in 1999, informally named "Archaeoraptor", displayed on the second floor of the museum.

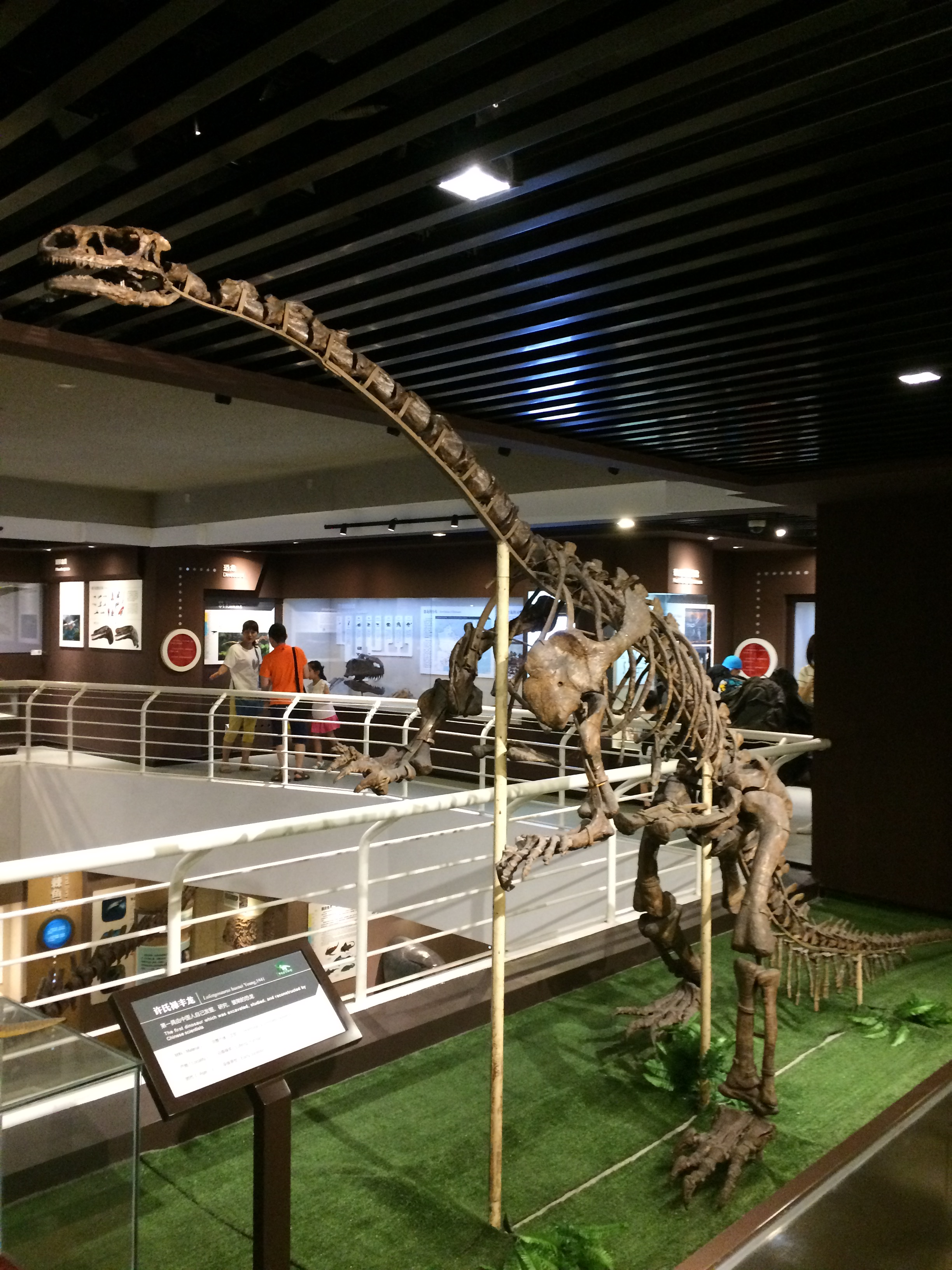
The holotype specimen of Lufengosaurus, the first fossil found in China, mounted at the museum.

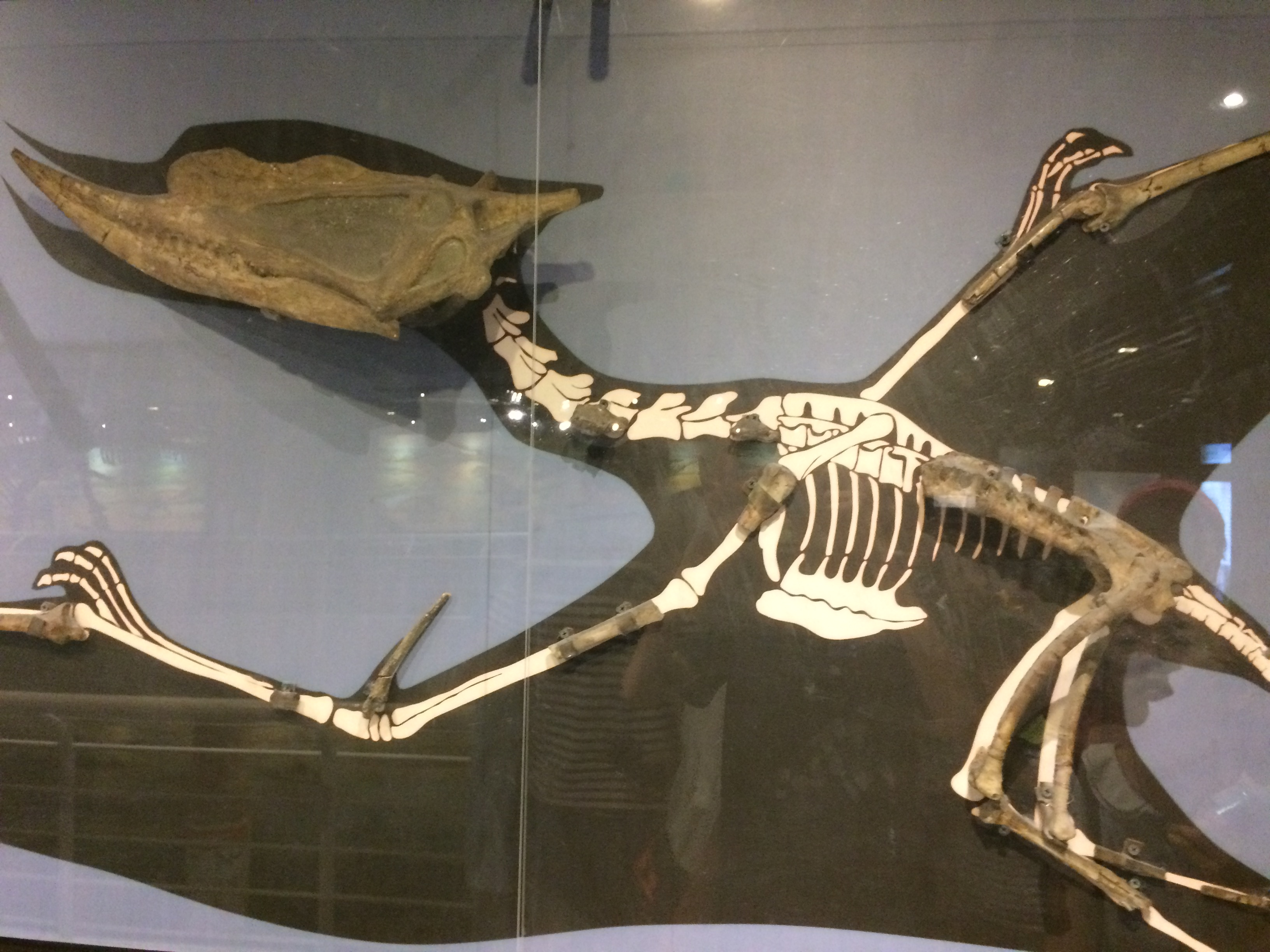
The holotype of Dsungaripterus displayed on the second floor.

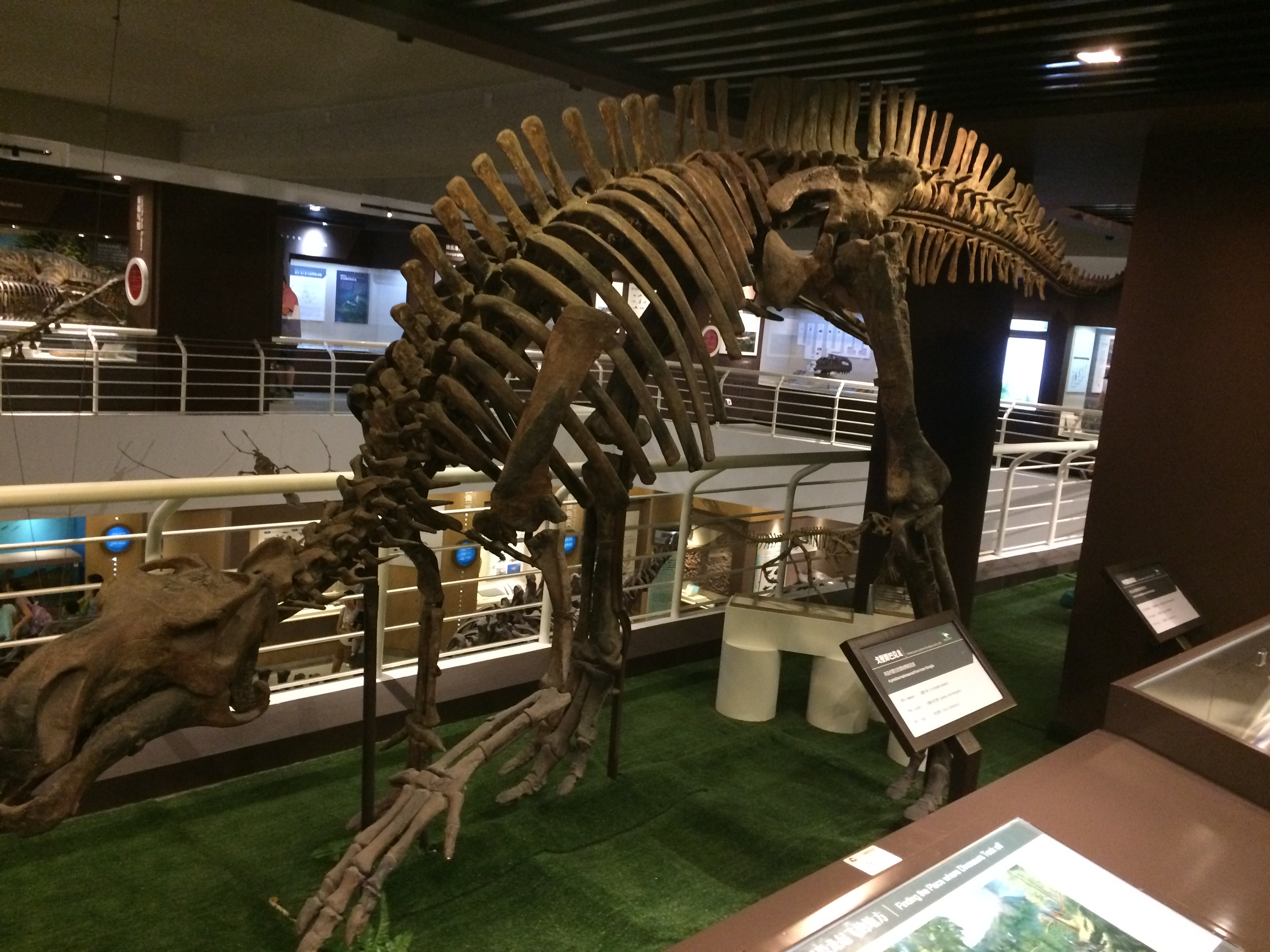
A mount of Probactrosaurus on the second floor.

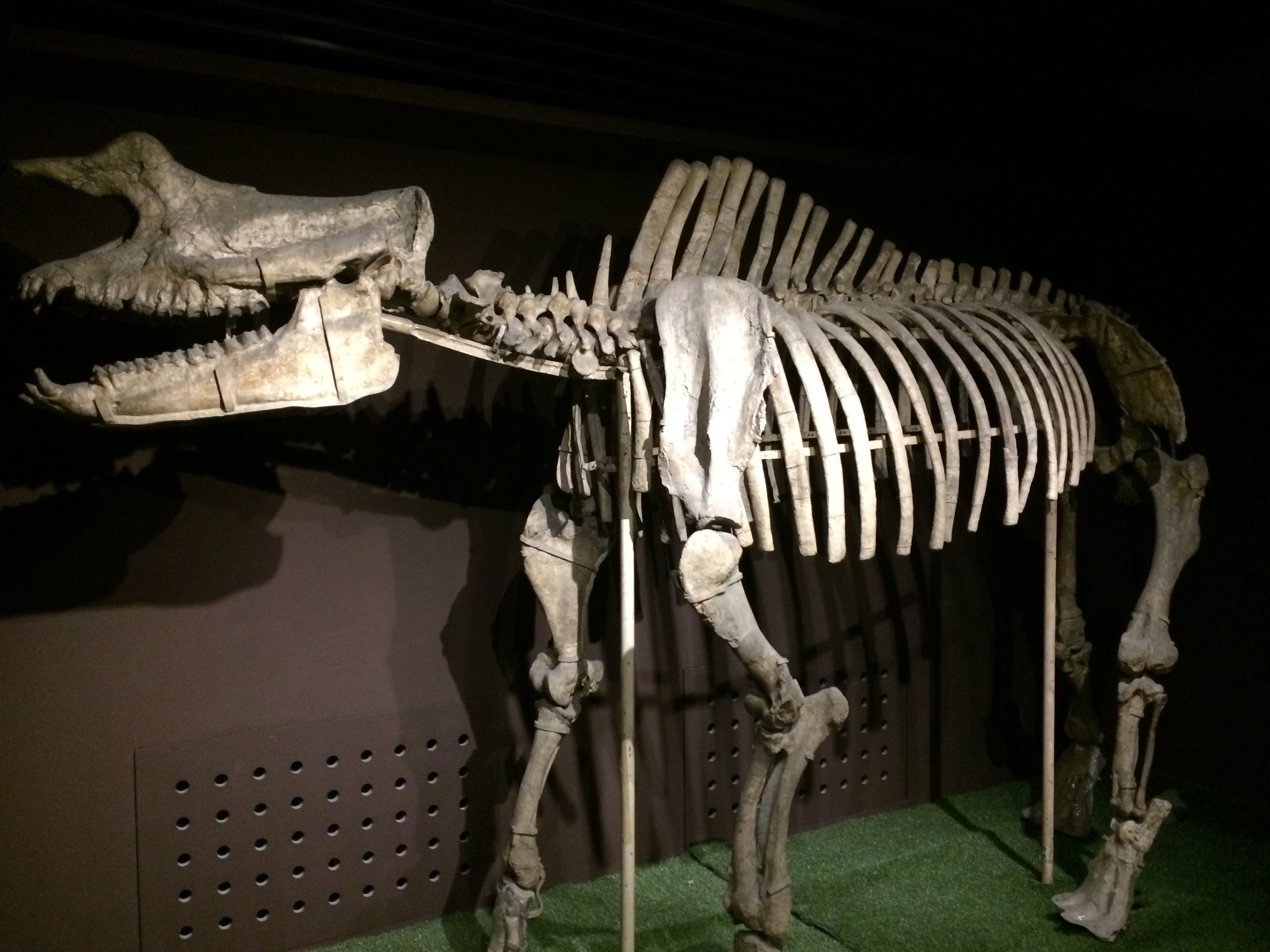
Rhinotitan mount on the third floor.

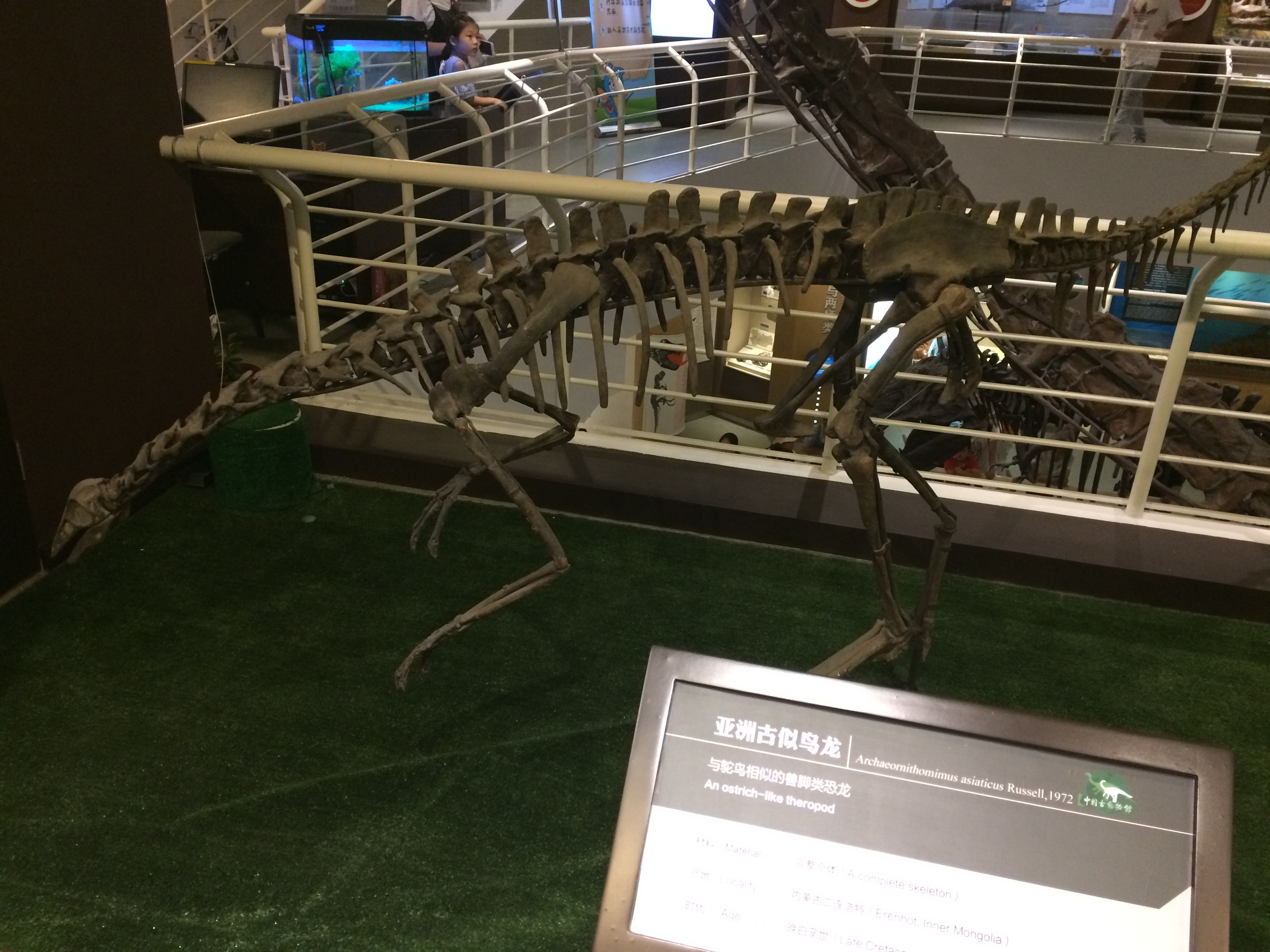
An Archaeornithomimus from Inner Mongolia mounted on the second floor.

== See also ==
- List of museums in China
