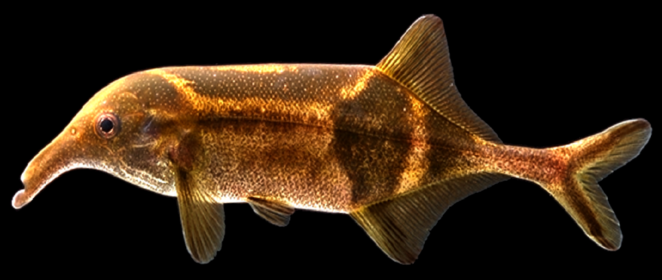
- Campylomormyrus tamandua

Scientific classification
- Kingdom: Animalia
- Phylum: Chordata
- Class: Actinopterygii
- Order: Osteoglossiformes
- Suborder: Notopteroidei; Jordan, 1923

Subgroups
- †Laeliichthys; †Lopadichthys; †Ostariostoma; †Palaeonotopterus; †Sinoglossus?; Notopteridae (featherfin knives); Mormyroidea; Gymnarchidae (aba); Mormyridae (elephantfishes)

= Notopteroidei =

Suborder of ray-finned fishes

Notopteroidei is a suborder of the order Osteoglossiformes that contains the extant families Gymnarchidae (aba), Notopteridae (feather backs and knifefish) and Mormyridae (elephantfishes), as well as several extinct taxa. The Mormyridae are weakly electric fishes, able to locate prey in turbid water.
