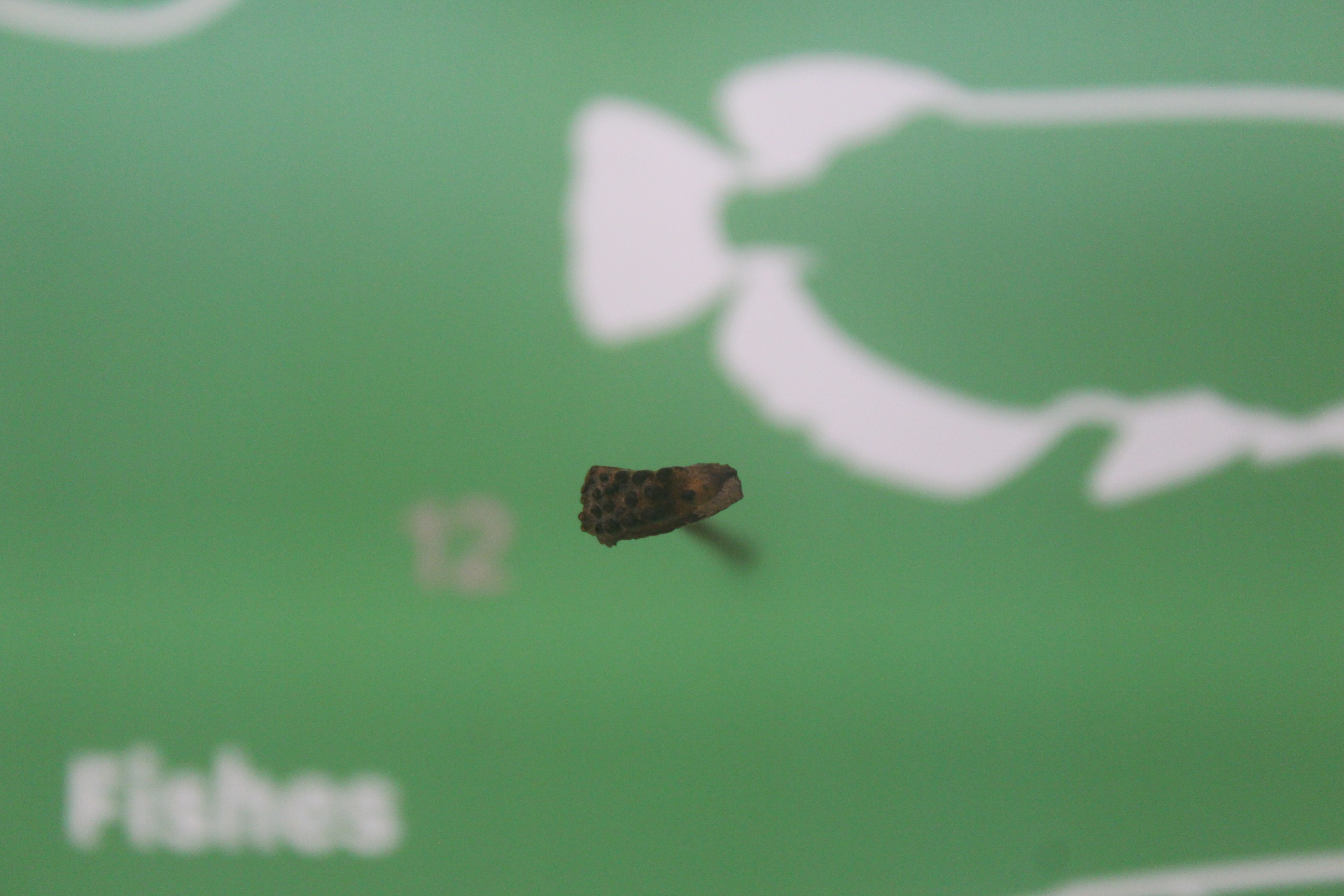
- Fossil tooth plate, National Museum of Natural History

Scientific classification
- Kingdom: Animalia
- Phylum: Chordata
- Class: Actinopterygii
- Cohort: Osteoglossomorpha
- Genus: †Coriops; Estes, 1969
- Species: †C. amnicolus

Binomial name
- †Coriops amnicolus Estes, 1969

= Coriops =

Coriops Temporal range: Cenomanian to Danian

Extinct genus of fishes

Coriops is an extinct genus of freshwater osteoglossomorph fish, possibly a hiodontiform, with a single species (C. amnicolus) known from the Late Cretaceous and Early Paleocene of western North America.

== Taxonomy ==
Sepkoski's compendium of marine fossil genera has it classified as an eel, but it has also been previously classified in the Elopiformes and the Osteoglossomorpha. More recent studies have affirmed it as being an osteoglossomorph, and have suggested that it may be a relative of the extant mooneyes (Hiodontidae). An indeterminate hiodontid specimen (found alongside the Raptorex holotype) from the Nemegt Formation of Mongolia was found to share close similarities with both Hiodon and Coriops.

== Distribution ==
Fossils of an indeterminate Coriops species are known as early as the Cenomanian of the Naturita Formation in Grand Staircase-Escalante National Monument in Utah, USA. Fossils of the species C. amnicolus become more common across a large area of North America around the Campanian, where they are known from the Kaiparowits Formation of Utah, the Mesa Verde Formation of Wyoming, and the Dinosaur Park Formation & Belly River Group in Alberta, Canada. During the Maastrichtian, remains of C. amnicolus are abundant and widespread in the Hell Creek Formation of Montana, the Dakotas, & Wyoming. The youngest records of Coriops are from the Early Paleocene-aged Fort Union Formation of Montana, suggesting that it at least briefly survived the Cretaceous–Paleogene extinction event that killed the dinosaurs. Even younger Coriops vertebrae were previously thought to have been identified from a Late Paleocene-aged locality of the Ravenscrag Formation in Saskatchewan, Canada. However, a re-analysis of these vertebra found them to instead more likely belong to the osteoglossomorph Lopadichthys, previously described from the Paleocene of Canada.

The wide distribution of Coriops in the North American interior, its disappearance and reappearance in southern regions such as Utah, and its general higher abundance in high latitude formations over lower latitude ones, suggests that it may have been a northernly-distributed species whose range repeatedly expanded south during cooler climactic intervals.

== See also ==
- Flora and fauna of the Maastrichtian stage
- List of prehistoric bony fish
