= Xixiaichthys =

Xixiaichthys Temporal range: Early Cretaceous, Barremian–Aptian

Scientific classification
- Kingdom: Animalia
- Phylum: Chordata
- Class: Actinopterygii
- Order: Osteoglossiformes
- Genus: †Xixiaichthys; Zhang, 2004
- Species: †X. tongxiensis

Binomial name
- †Xixiaichthys tongxiensis Zhang, 2004

Extinct genus of bony fish

Xixiaichthys is an extinct genus of osteoglossiform fish that lived in China during the Early Cretaceous and was found in the Madongshan Formation and also the Xinminbao Group. The type species is Xixiaichthys tongxiensis and is based on the holotype (specimen V 13114.1), a complete skeleton, and several other specimens of varying completeness.

Kim et al. (2022) compared a fish centrum found with the holotype of the theropod dinosaur Raptorex kriegsteini with Harenaichthys lui and Xixiaichthys tongxinensis, and interpreted their findings as supporting the conclusion that the holotype of R. kriegsteini comes from the Nemegt Formation. They also tentatively assigned the centrum to their new genus Harenaichthys.
