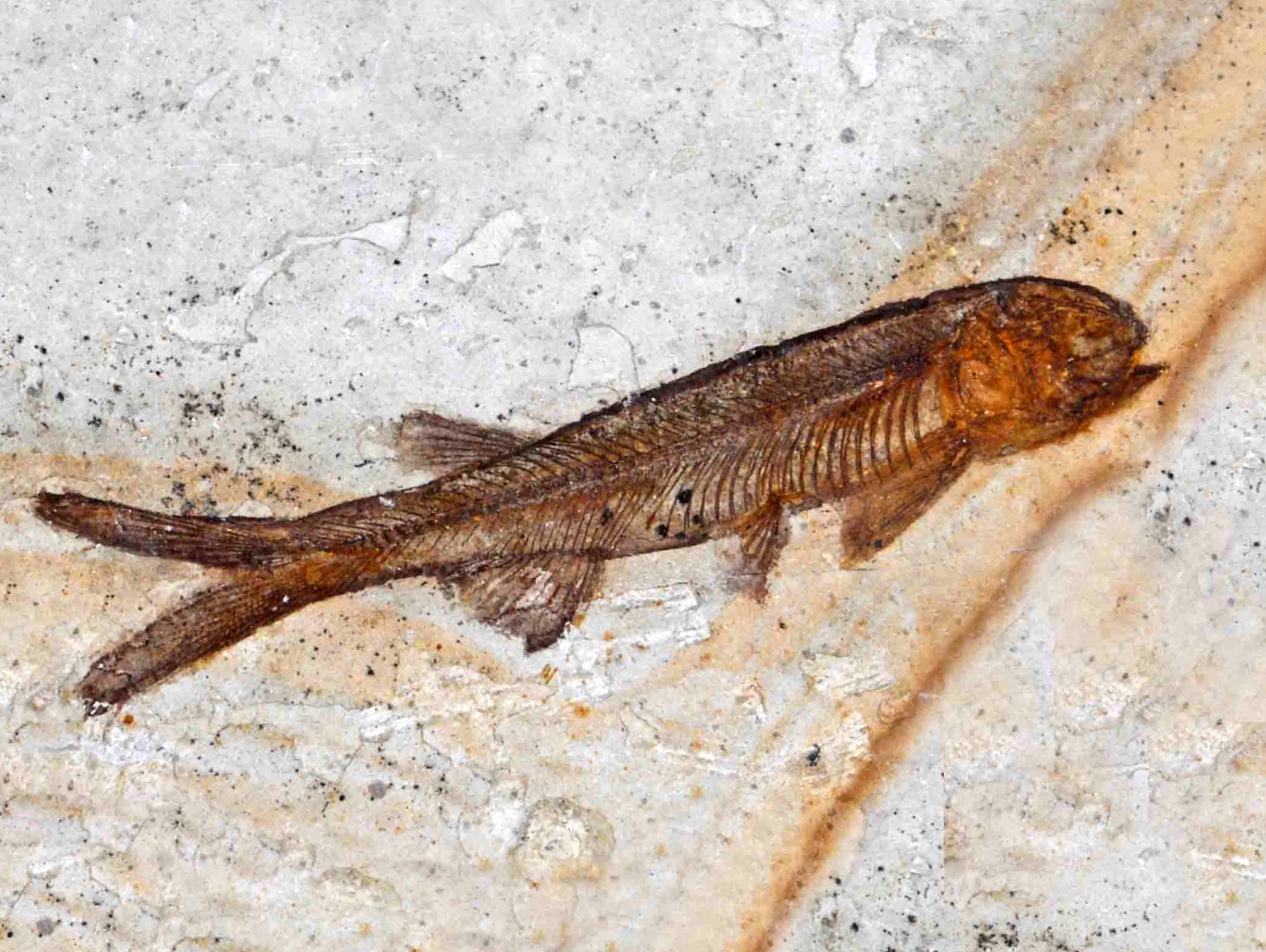
- Lycoptera species from China

Scientific classification
- Kingdom: Animalia
- Phylum: Chordata
- Class: Actinopterygii
- Division: Teleostei
- Cohort: Osteoglossomorpha
- Order: †Lycopteriformes
- Family: †Lycopteridae; Liu, Su, Huang & Chang, 1963

= Lycopteridae =

Lycopteridae Temporal range: from Jurassic to Cretaceous

Extinct family of ray-finned fishes

Lycopteridae is an extinct family of freshwater osteoglossomorph ray-finned fishes.

== Genera ==
- Lycoptera Müller, 1848
- Aokiichthys Yabumoto 1994
- Changichthys Su 1991
- Manchurichthys Saito 1936
- Neolycoptera Dolgopol de Saez 1939
- Pingolepis Chang & Chow 1974
- Tongxinichthys Ma 1980
- Yixianichthys Wu 2003
- Yungkangichthys Chang and Chou 1974

== Description ==
These ray-finned fishes were small, often only a finger's length, with small, almost circular scales.

== Distribution ==
They occurred in East Asian rivers and lakes from the Jurassic to Cretaceous. Fossils of these fishes have been found in China and Japan.
