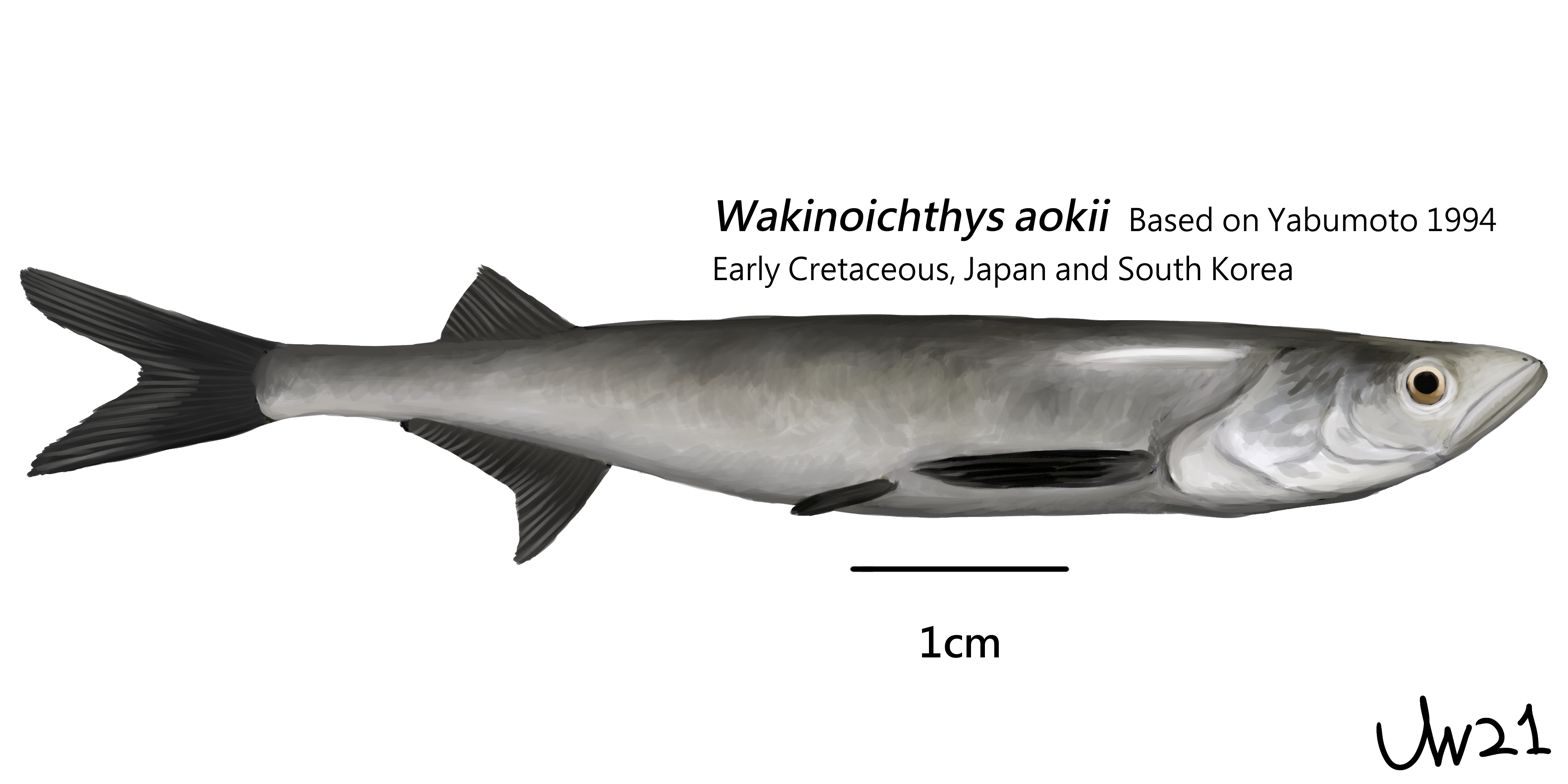
- Life reconstruction of W. aokii

Scientific classification
- Kingdom: Animalia
- Phylum: Chordata
- Class: Actinopterygii
- Order: Osteoglossiformes
- Family: †Wakinoichthiidae; Yabumoto, 1994
- Genus: †Wakinoichthys; Yabumoto, 1994

Type species
- Wakinoichthys aokii Yabumoto, 1994

Species
- Wakinoichthys aokii Yabumoto, 1994; Wakinoichthys robustus Yabumoto, 1994

= Wakinoichthys =

Wakinoichthys Temporal range: Albian

Extinct genus of fishes

Wakinoichthys is a small freshwater fish from the Early Cretaceous (Albian) of South Korea and Japan. Two species are currently known, W. aokii and W. robustus.

== History and naming ==
The first specimens of Wakinoichthys have been discovered from the Gamou Formation (referred to as Third Formation) of the Wakino Subgroup, a part of the Kanmon Group from Kitakyushu, Japan. Starting in 1977 Japanese and Korean researchers have cooperated in excavating fossils from the Jinju Formation of the Gyeongsang Supergroup in South Korea, previously known to have yielded the fossils of plants and molluscs. In these collaborative efforts multiple fossil fish had been discovered, including a specimen of Wakinoichthys.

First described in 1994, the generic name derives from the Wakino Subgroup and ichthys, the Greek word for fish. W. aokii was named for Mr. Tateyu Aoki, who collected and donated the specimens to the Kitakyushu Museum and Institute of Natural History, while W. robustus was named for its more robust build compared to its relative. The Jinju Formation is dated to the Albian age, and it is likely that the Gamou Formation is around the same age.

== Description ==
Wakinoichthys aokii was a proportionally long and slender fish, reaching lengths between 7–12 cm (2.8–4.7 in) which are 6.4 times longer than its body depth. The median fins are positioned relatively posterior and the dorsal fin's origin lies behind that of the anal fin. The base of the dorsal fin is about half the length of the anal fin's base. The pectoral fins are elongated with a stout first pectoral fin ray. The pelvic fin is located at the centre of the abdoman and the caudal fin is forked. Wakinoichthys had long lower jaws that housed small canine-like teeth, while those of the upper jaw were larger and more pronounced. The endopterygoid meanwhile housed villiform teeth.

W. robustus differs from W. aokii due to its more robust build. Its total body length is only 3.8 times longer than its body depth and with a proportionally bigger head. The dorsal outline of the skull is slightly convex. The holotype specimen of W. robustus is 3.86 cm (1.52 in) long, while the other specimen are typically smaller.

== Phylogeny ==
Yabumoto assigns Wakinoichthys to the order of the Osteoglossiformes, which includes the modern arowana, butterflyfish, elephantfish and knifefish based on a series of characters such as the position of the median fins, dentition of the premaxilla and dentary and villiform endopterygoid teeth among other morphological traits.
