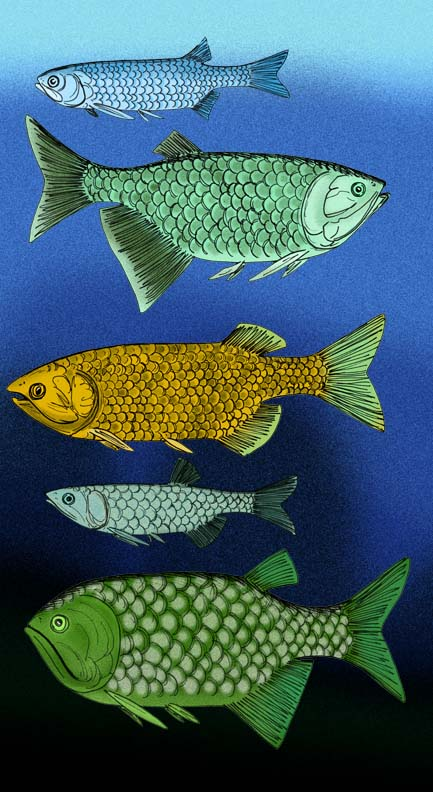

Scientific classification
- Domain: Eukaryota
- Kingdom: Animalia
- Phylum: Chordata
- Class: Actinopterygii
- Order: †Lycopteriformes
- Family: †Lycopteridae
- Genus: †Aokiichthys; Yabumoto, 1994

Type species
- Aokiichthys toriyamai Yabumoto, 1994

Species
- See text

= Aokiichthys =

Aokiichthys Temporal range: 132.9–129.4 Ma Hauterivian

Extinct genus of fishes

Aokiichthys is an extinct genus of basal osteoglossoid from an Early Cretaceous freshwater palaeolake of what is now Kyushu, Japan. The genus formed a species radiation in the First Formation within the Wakino Subgroup of the Kwanmon Group, as a dominant member and namesake of the Nipponamia-Aokiichthys fauna. The genus became extinct at the end of either the 1st Formation, or possibly during the 2nd Formation, when the palaeolake became shallower.

Aokiichthys is described as being closely related to the genera Yungkangichthys, and Paralycoptera (at the time of Aokiichthys' description, all three genera were thought to be lycopterids). In their 2009 study, Xu and Chang reassess Paralycoptera to be a basal osteoglossoid, and synonymized both Yungkangichthys and Aokiichthys into Paralycoptera.

== Etymology ==
The generic name honors one (Mr. Tateyu) Aoki, who collected and donated the majority of the first specimens.

== Species ==
=== Aokiichthys toriyamai ===
Aokiichthys toriyamai is the type species of the genus. It has a comparatively moderate body. Body lengths range from about 35 to 75 millimeters. The specific name honors the late Dr. Ryuzu Toriyama, who was the lead advisor on the first two expeditions for Mesozoic fossils in Kitakyushu City.

=== Aokiichthys changae ===
Aokiichthys changae has large teeth on its parasphenoid. It has a comparatively moderate body. Body lengths range from about 63 to 83 millimeters. The specific name honors the Chinese palaeoichthyologist, Dr. Chang Mee-Mann, one of the leading experts in Chinese Mesozoic fish fossils.

=== Aokiichthys otai ===
Aokiichthys otai is a very deep-bodied species that closely resembles Yungkangichthys. Body lengths range from 55 to 60 millimeters. The specific name honors Dr. Masamichi Ota, who organized the first expedition for Mesozoic fossils in Kitakyushu City.

=== Aokiichthys uyenoi ===
Aokiichthys uyenoi is a fairly deep-bodied species. The average body length is around 56 millimeters. The specific name honors the Japanese ichthyologist, Dr. Teruya Uyeno, who advised Yoshitaka Yabumoto in his description of the Wakino Subgroup fish taxa.

=== Aokiichthys praedorsalis ===
Aokiichthys praedorsalis is the largest species in the genus, with a typical length of 147 millimeters. The specific name refers to how the large dorsal fin is placed more anteriorly in comparison to the other species.
