= Shuleichthys =

Shuleichthys Temporal range: Aptian ~125–113 Ma

Scientific classification
- Kingdom: Animalia
- Phylum: Chordata
- Class: Actinopterygii
- Cohort: Osteoglossomorpha
- Genus: †Shuleichthys; Murray et al., 2010

Type species
- †Shuleichthys brachypteryx Murray et al., 2010

Extinct genus of ray-finned fishes

Shuleichthys brachypteryx is an extinct species of ray-finned fish which existed in China during the Cretaceous period. Fossils of the fish were found in the Aptian Xiagou Formation of the Changma Basin. It is the only species in the genus Shuleichthys and cannot be placed in any order of the Osteoglossomorpha without making that order paraphyletic.
