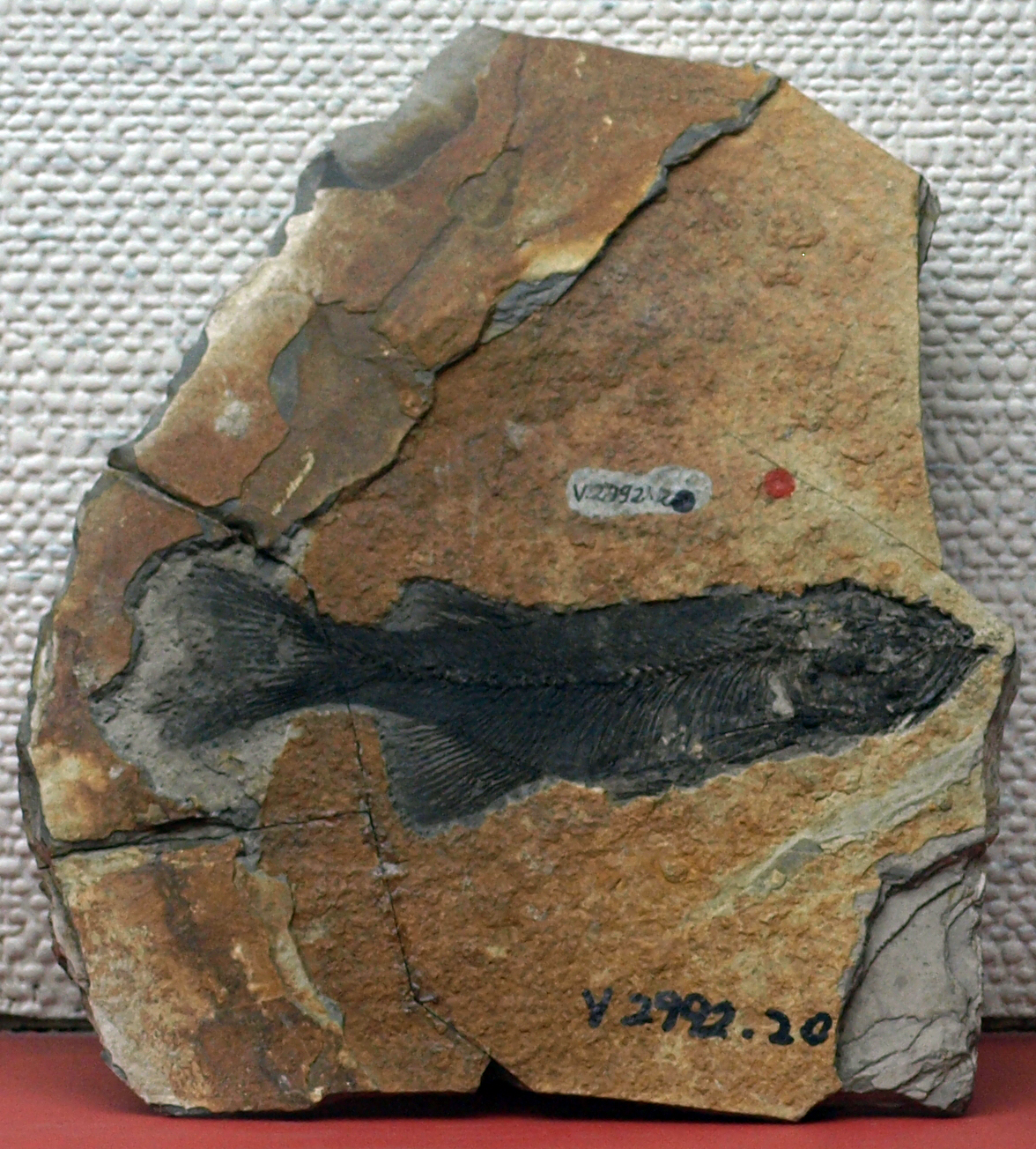

Scientific classification
- Kingdom: Animalia
- Phylum: Chordata
- Class: Actinopterygii
- Division: Teleostei
- Order: Osteoglossiformes
- Genus: †Paralycoptera; Chang & Chou, 1977
- Species: †P. wui

Binomial name
- †Paralycoptera wui Chang & Chou, 1977

Synonyms
- Paralycoptera changi Ma & Sun, 1988

= Paralycoptera =

Paralycoptera Temporal range: 125–100.5 Ma Aptian-Albian

Extinct genus of fishes

Paralycoptera wui is an extinct species of basal osteoglossoid from Early Cretaceous freshwater environments of what is now China. P. wui was originally described as a lycopterid osteoglossomorph close to Lycoptera, though, later, on the basis of several well preserved specimens, Xu and Chang (2009) reassessed it as a basal osteoglossoid on the basis of better-preserved fossil material. Xu and Chang also synonymized the second described species, P. changi, as well as Tanolepis and Yungkangichthys hsitanensis (while neglecting the Japanese species, Y. macrodon), alleging that all of them were too similar to P. wui to merit separate generic or specific status, and that any anatomical differences between these taxa were due to taphonomic distortions of the specimens. In the same study, Xu and Chang also synonymized the related Japanese osteoglossomorph genus, Aokiichthys, on the basis of the two genera having an almost identical number of vertebrae, though they did not specify whether they were simply merging the two genera together, or if all the species within Aokiichthys were to be demoted as synonyms of P. wui.
