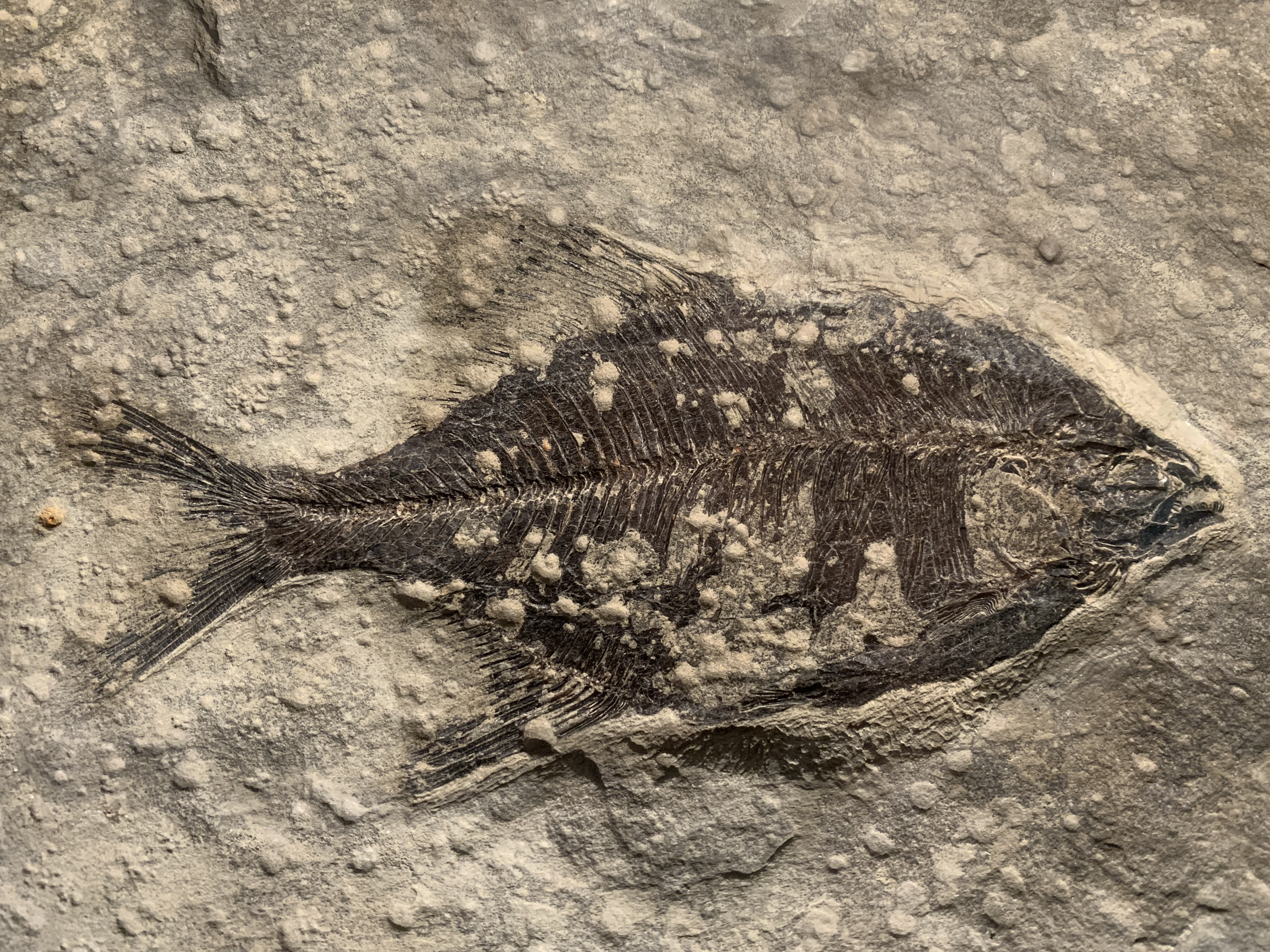
- J. tanyourus holotype, Paskapoo Formation, Late Palaeocene

Scientific classification
- Kingdom: Animalia
- Phylum: Chordata
- Class: Actinopterygii
- Division: Teleostei
- Order: Osteoglossiformes
- Family: Osteoglossidae
- Genus: †Joffrichthys; Li and Wilson, 1996

= Joffrichthys =

Extinct genus of fishes

Joffrichthys is a genus of prehistoric bony fish. This North American genus includes three species, J. symmetropterus, J. tanyourus and J. triangulpterus. The last species is known from the Paleocene of the Sentinel Butte Formation of North Dakota.

== See also ==
- Prehistoric fish
- List of prehistoric bony fish
