= Ostariostoma =

Ostariostoma Temporal range: Late Cretaceous

Scientific classification
- Domain: Eukaryota
- Kingdom: Animalia
- Phylum: Chordata
- Class: Actinopterygii
- Order: Elopiformes
- Genus: †Ostariostoma; Schaeffer, 1949

Extinct genus of fishes

Ostariostoma is an extinct genus of prehistoric bony fish that lived during the Late Cretaceous epoch.

== See also ==
- Prehistoric fish
- List of prehistoric bony fish
