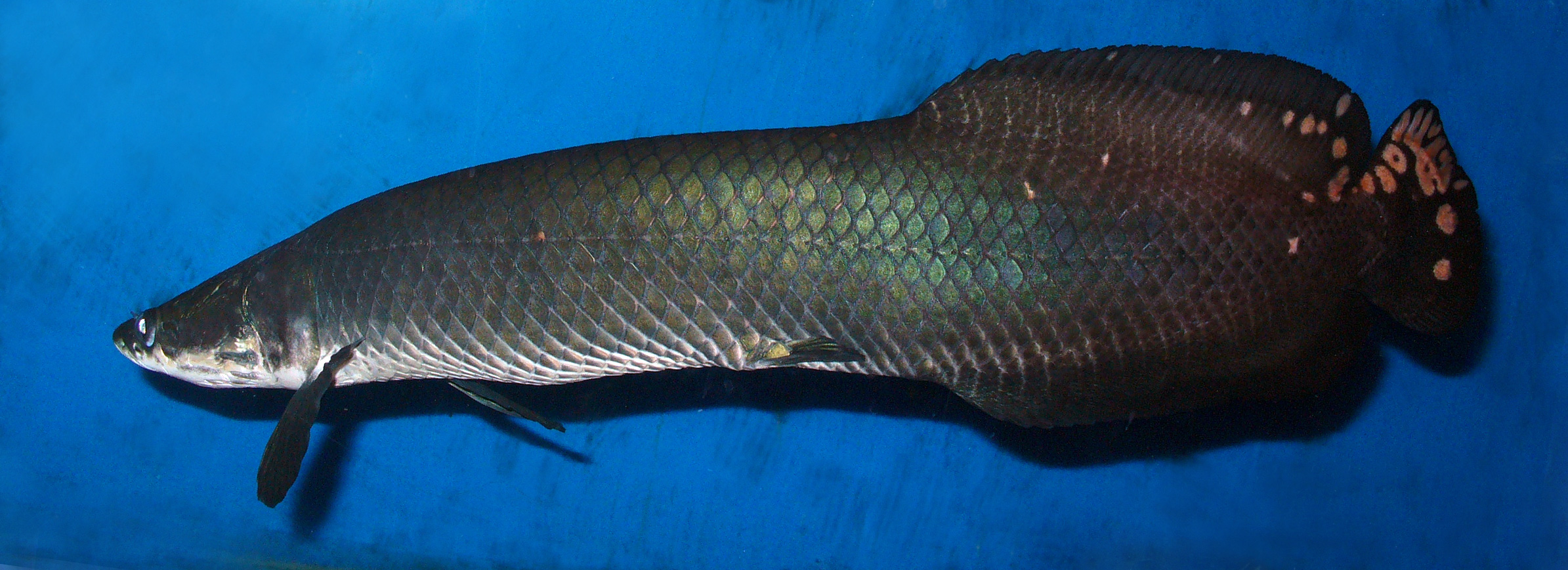
- In Sevastopol Zoo

Conservation status
- Data Deficient (IUCN 3.1)
- CITES Appendix II

Scientific classification
- Kingdom: Animalia
- Phylum: Chordata
- Class: Actinopterygii
- Order: Osteoglossiformes
- Family: Arapaimidae
- Genus: Arapaima
- Species: A. leptosoma

Binomial name
- Arapaima leptosoma Stewart, 2013

= Arapaima leptosoma =

Species of fish

Arapaima leptosoma is a species of freshwater fish endemic to Brazil. It is a member of the arapaimas, a genus of air-breathing fish that contains some of the world's largest freshwater fish. Like other members of the genus Arapaima, this fish can breathe air. It is known only from the confluence of the Solimões and Purus Rivers in Amazonas, Brazil, although due to the lack of obvious geographic barriers, it likely has a larger range.

Described in 2013, it is the first new member of Arapaima to be described since 1847. It is known from a single holotype that likely represents a juvenile individual. Live individuals occasionally show up in the aquarium trade, although they are usually misidentified as Arapaima gigas. It has a deep caudal peduncle relative to other species in its genus.

It is classified as data deficient by the IUCN Red List due to the lack of information about the population or threats to species. However, it is presumably threatened by overfishing as with other members of the genus.
