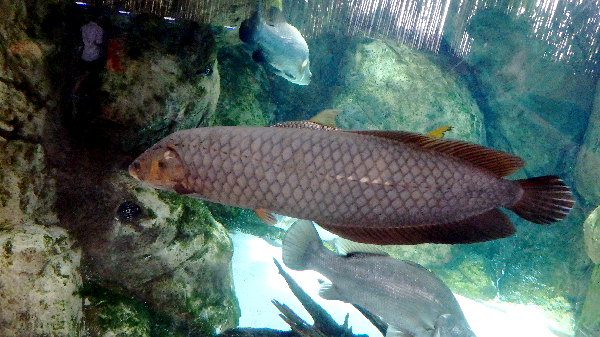

Conservation status
- Least Concern (IUCN 3.1)

Scientific classification
- Kingdom: Animalia
- Phylum: Chordata
- Class: Actinopterygii
- Order: Osteoglossiformes
- Family: Arapaimidae
- Genus: Heterotis; Rüppell, 1828
- Species: H. niloticus

Binomial name
- Heterotis niloticus (G. Cuvier, 1829)
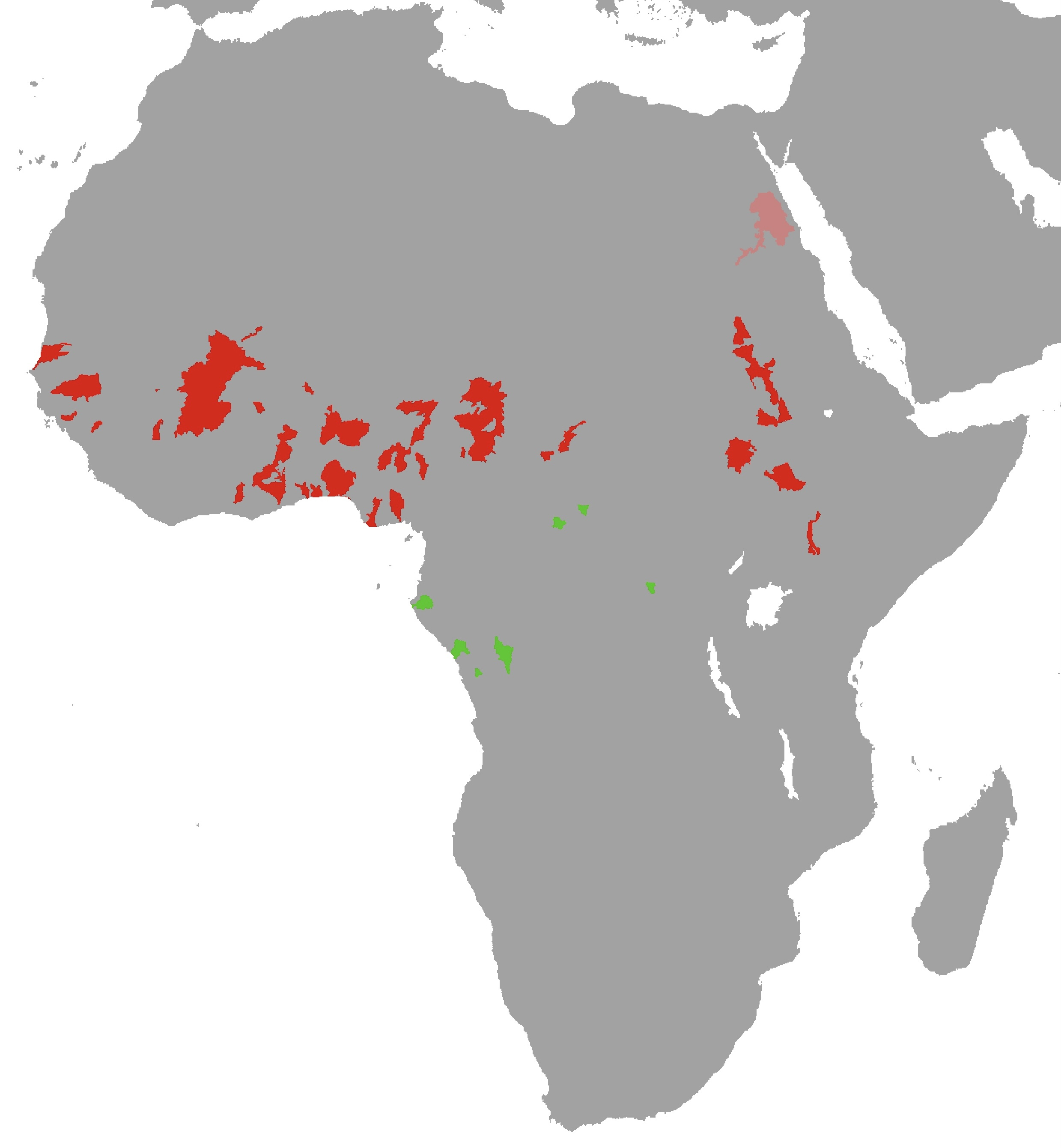
- Red:extant, Light red: possibly extant, Green:introduced

Synonyms
- Genus: Clupisudis Swainson, 1839; Helicobranchus Hyrtl, 1854; Species List: * Clupisudis niloticus (G. Cuvier, 1829); * Sudis nilotica G. Cuvier, 1829; * Sudis adansonii G. Cuvier, 1829; * Heterotis adansonii (G. Cuvier, 1829); * Sudis niloticus Rüppell, 1829 (ambiguous); * Heterotis adansoni Valenciennes, 1847; * Heterotis ehrenbergii Valenciennes, 1847

= African arowana =

Species of ray-finned fish

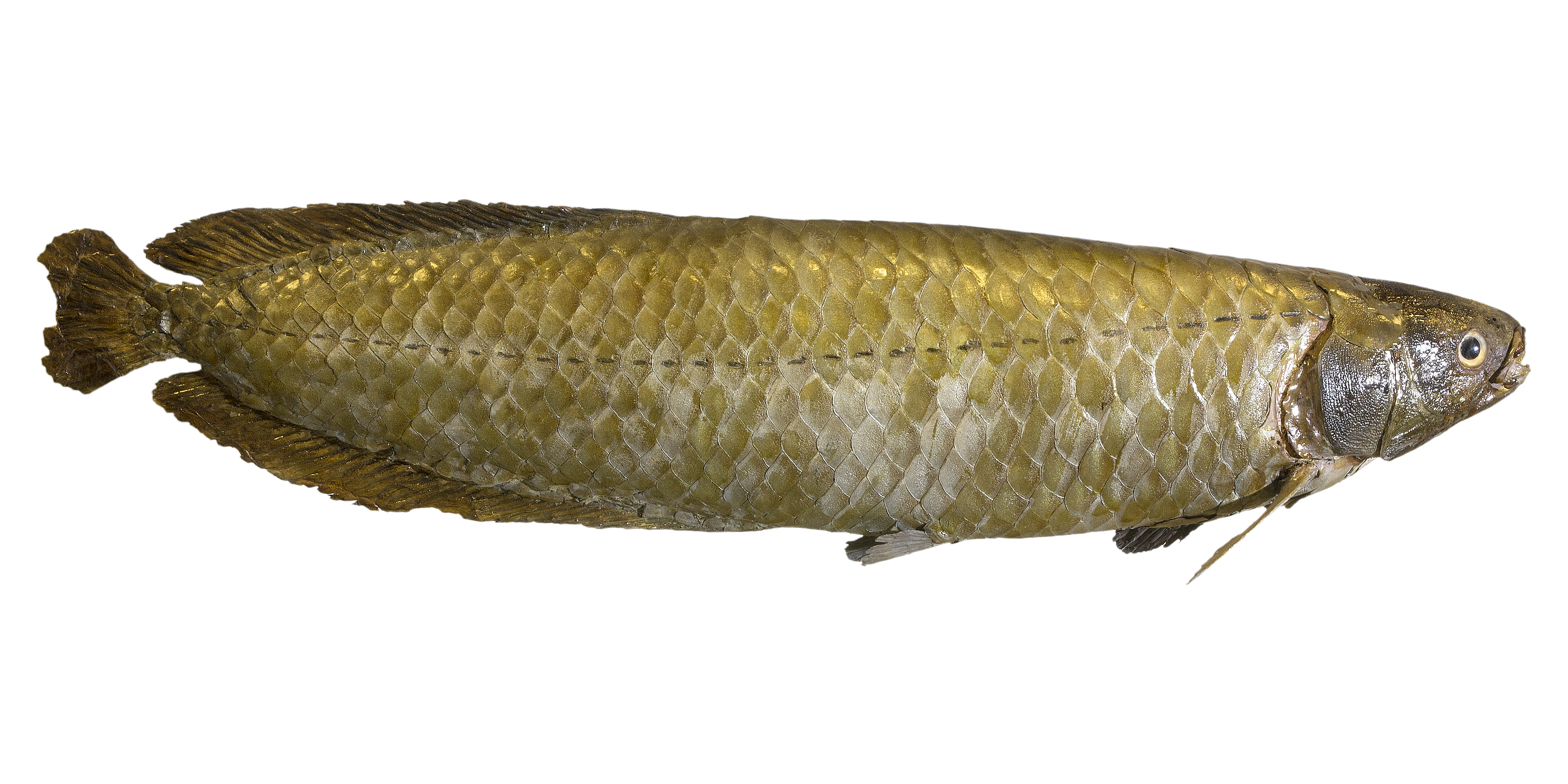
Heterotis niloticus - MHNT

The African arowana or Nile arowana (Heterotis niloticus) is a species of bonytongue. Despite being called an "arowana", the African arowana is more closely related to arapaimas, the only other members in the subfamily Arapaiminae, than the South American, Asian, and Australian arowanas in the subfamily Osteoglossinae (Arapaiminae is sometimes considered to be a separate family from Osteoglossidae). Compared to these, the African arowana has a more terminal mouth and is the only one that feeds extensively on plankton.

== Description ==
The African arowana is a long-bodied fish with large scales, long dorsal and anal fins set far back on the body, and a rounded caudal fin. Its height is 3.5 to 5.0 times standard length. It has been reported to reach up to 1 m (3.3 ft) long and weigh up to 10.2 kg (22 lb).

This fish is gray, brown, or bronze in color. Coloration is uniform in adults, but juveniles often have dark longitudinal bands.

African arowanas have air-breathing organs on its branchiae, enabling them to survive in oxygen-depleted water. A suprabranchial organ allows it to concentrate small planktonic food particles and also has a sensory function.

== Range ==
This species is widespread throughout Africa, where it is native to all the watersheds in Sahelo-Sudanese region, Senegal, and Gambia, as well as parts of eastern Africa. This range includes the basins of the Corubal, Volta, Ouémé, Niger, Bénoué, and Nile Rivers, as well as those of Lake Chad and Lake Turkana. It has been successfully introduced to Côte d'Ivoire, the Cross River in Nigeria, the Sanaga and Nyong Rivers in Cameroon, and the Ogooué River in Gabon, as well as the lower and middle Congo River basin, including Ubangui and Kasaï Rivers. It has also been introduced in Madagascar. In some cases, introduction is reported to have had a negative impact on the local ecology.

== Human use ==
Capture (blue) and aquaculture (green) production of African arowana (Heterotis niloticus) in thousand tonnes from 1950 to 2022, as reported by the FAO

African arowana is used locally as a food fish and has been collected in the past for the aquarium trade. It is not aggressive like its relatives. It is aquacultured in its native range, being a very successful culture due to its tolerance for crowding and ease of feeding.
