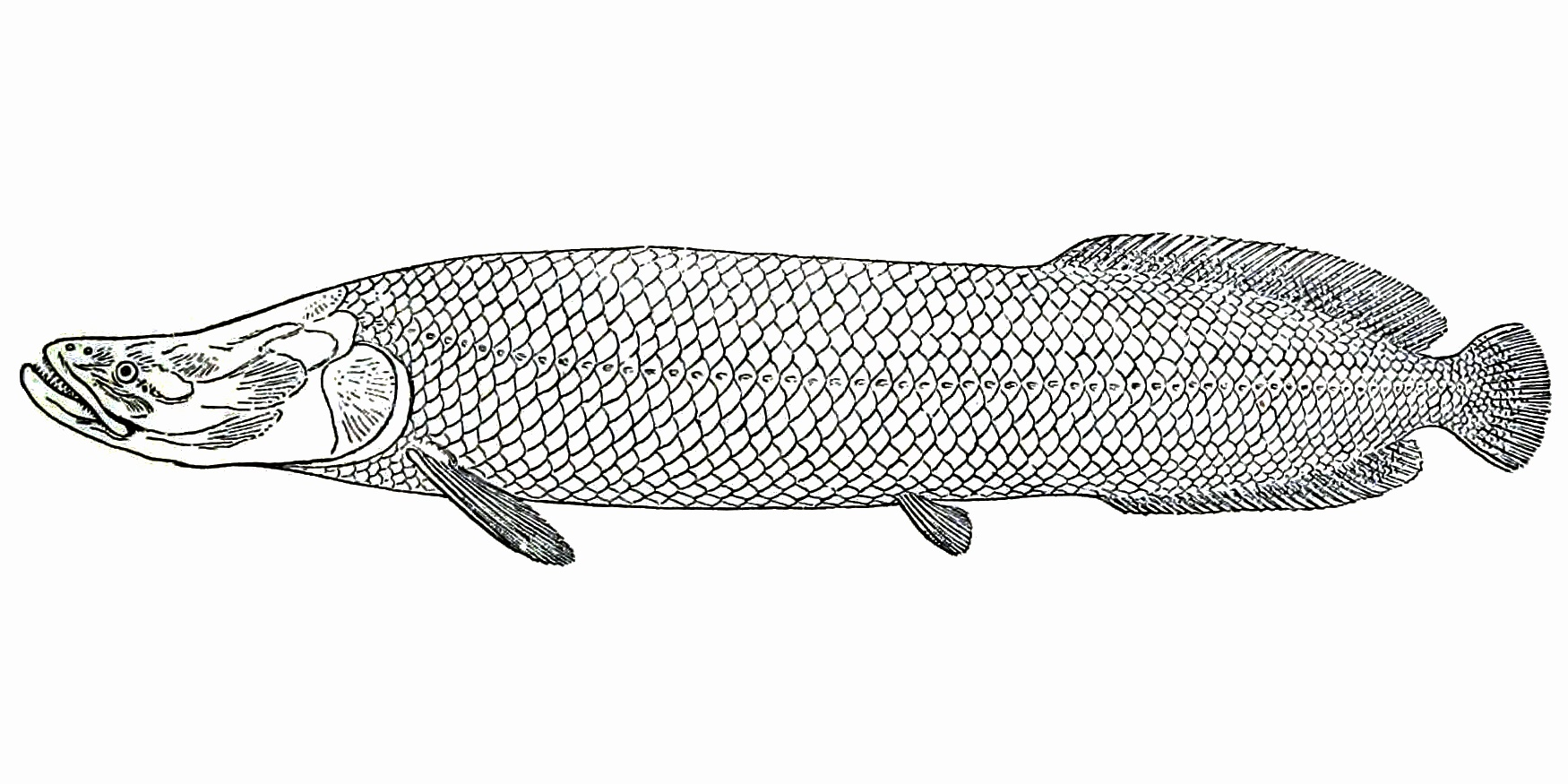
- Arapaima sp.

Scientific classification
- Kingdom: Animalia
- Phylum: Chordata
- Class: Actinopterygii
- Order: Osteoglossiformes
- Family: Arapaimidae; Bonaparte, 1846

Genera
- Arapaima; Heterotis

Synonyms
- Sudidinae

= Arapaimidae =

Subfamily of ray-finned fishes

Arapaimidae is a family of freshwater ray-finned fish belonging to the order Osteoglossiformes. It includes the South American arapaimas of the Amazon and Essequibo basins and the African arowana (Heterotis niloticus) from the watersheds of the Sahelo-Sudanese region, Senegal, Gambia, and parts of Eastern Africa. This family is sometimes treated as the subfamily Arapaiminae. A commonly used synonym is Heterotidinae, but according to the ICZN, Arapaimidae has priority.

Arapaimides, along with other osteoglossomorphs, are of phylogenetic and evolutionary interest due to their trans-oceanic distribution, excellent fossil record, and position as one of the oldest living teleost lineages. The type-species of the group, Arapaima gigas, is an important South American food source and charismatic representative of the region. Both Arapaima and Heterotis are cultured for food in their respective countries due to their heartiness and meat, and the arapaima is a prized sport-fish, being the largest truly freshwater fish.

== Phylogeny and systematics ==
The internal placement of Osteoglossomorpha within crown-group teleosts is contested, with competing morphological and molecular analyses placing them either as sister to all other extant teleosts, or internal to Elopimorpha and sister to the clade consisting of Otocephala and Euteleostei.

The placement and name of the clade containing Arapaima and Heterotis is also uncertain. Some include this clade in the family Osteoglossidae with the South American and Asian arowana. Others place Arapaima and Heterotis together in their own family, Arapaimidae.

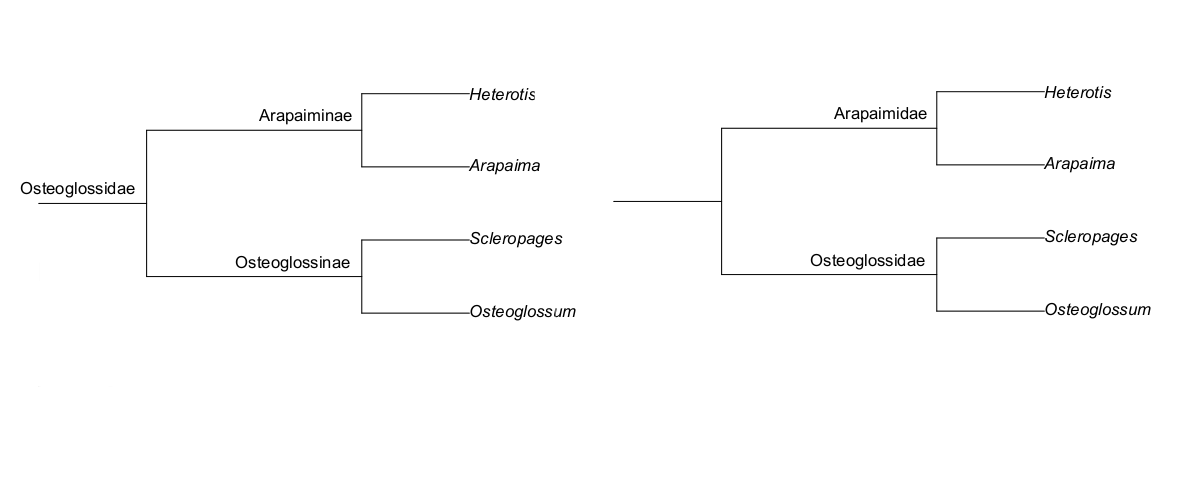

== Taxonomy ==
Arapaima taxonomy was recently revised to revalidate old names and describe a new species, proposing 6 existing species (see below) and invalidating current museum specimens. However, these four proposed or reestablished species are known only from singular holotype specimens, and only that of A. mapae and A. leptostoma still currently exist. Typically, all species of Arapaima described by Valenciennes, Spix, and Agassiz are referred to as A. gigas, though current taxonomy could be revised with more thorough evidence. Currently, population genetic evidence supports a singular Arapaima species with two distinct genetic populations: an Amazonas population (exhibiting a pattern of isolation by distance), and an Araguaia-Tocantins basin population. There is little debate that Heterotis is a monotypic genus represented by only H. niloticus.

- Arapaimidae Bonaparte, 1846
  - †Arapaimidarum [otolith]
  - †Heterotidinarum Nolf, Rana & Prasad 2008 [otolith]
  - †Thrissopterus Heckel 1856
  - †Joffrichthys? Li & Wilson 1996
  - †Sinoglossus? Su 1986
  - Heterotis Rüppell 1829 ex Ehrenberg 1836 (African arowana)
    - H. niloticus (Cuvier, 1829)
  - Arapaima Müller 1843 (arapaima)
    - A. agassizii (Valenciennes, 1847)
    - A. gigas (Schinz, 1822)
    - A. leptosoma Stewart, 2013
    - A. mapae (Valenciennes, 1847)
    - A. sp. incertae sedis

== Description and biology ==
=== Description ===
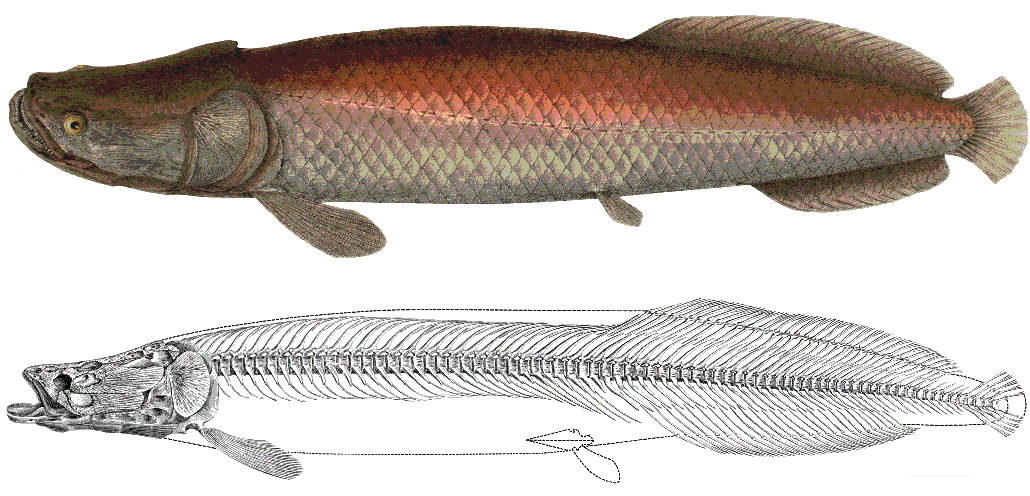
Illustration by Louis Agassiz of what is now considered the type specimen for A. agassizii, with osteological study (from Spix and Agassiz, 1829)

Arapaimides are characterized by elongate, slender bodies with large scales and long dorsal and anal fins positioned close to a short caudal peduncle. The pelvic fins are small and abdominal if present. They lack chin barbels, have a glossolaryngeal (tongue) bone with teeth present, and the premaxillae are fixed to the skull. Branched caudal fin rays are less than sixteen, branchiostegal rays between three and seven, and hypurals less than 6. Heterotis possesses a specialized suprabranchial organ for concentrating and filtering small food particles.

=== Biology ===
Both genera make use of similar freshwater habitats in the respective region, with Arapaima found in the floodplains of the Amazon and Esequibo river basins of South America and Heterotis found in littoral zones of large, open rivers in all Sahelo-Sudanese basins of Africa. Arapaima is typically a top-water fish predator, while Heterotis is a benthic mud-filterer primarily feeding on phytoplankton and small crustaceans with their suprabranchial organ. Both groups are obligate air-breathers and nest-builders, with males guarding eggs and young.

== Evolution ==
A genetic study shows that Arapaimidae diverged from Osteoglossinae about 220 million years ago, during the Late Triassic. Within Osteoglossinae, the lineage leading to the South American Osteoglossum arowanas diverged about 170 million years ago, during the Middle Jurassic. The Asian and Australian arowanas in the genus Scleropages separated about 140 million years ago, during the Early Cretaceous.

Originally, it was thought that the breakup of Gondwana 150 – 30 million years ago was the evolutionary cause of the trans-continental distribution of the osteoglossomorphs. However, minimum ages of intercontinental clades and presence of marine forms in the fossil records imply that ancestral trans-oceanic dispersal is possible. Tests of these hypotheses are currently inconclusive as they are dependent on an a priori calibrated age of crown-group Teleostei, about which fossil and molecular evidence disagree. I.e., hypotheses do not fail only if Teleostei are of Permian origin, but molecular inferences push crown ages further back.

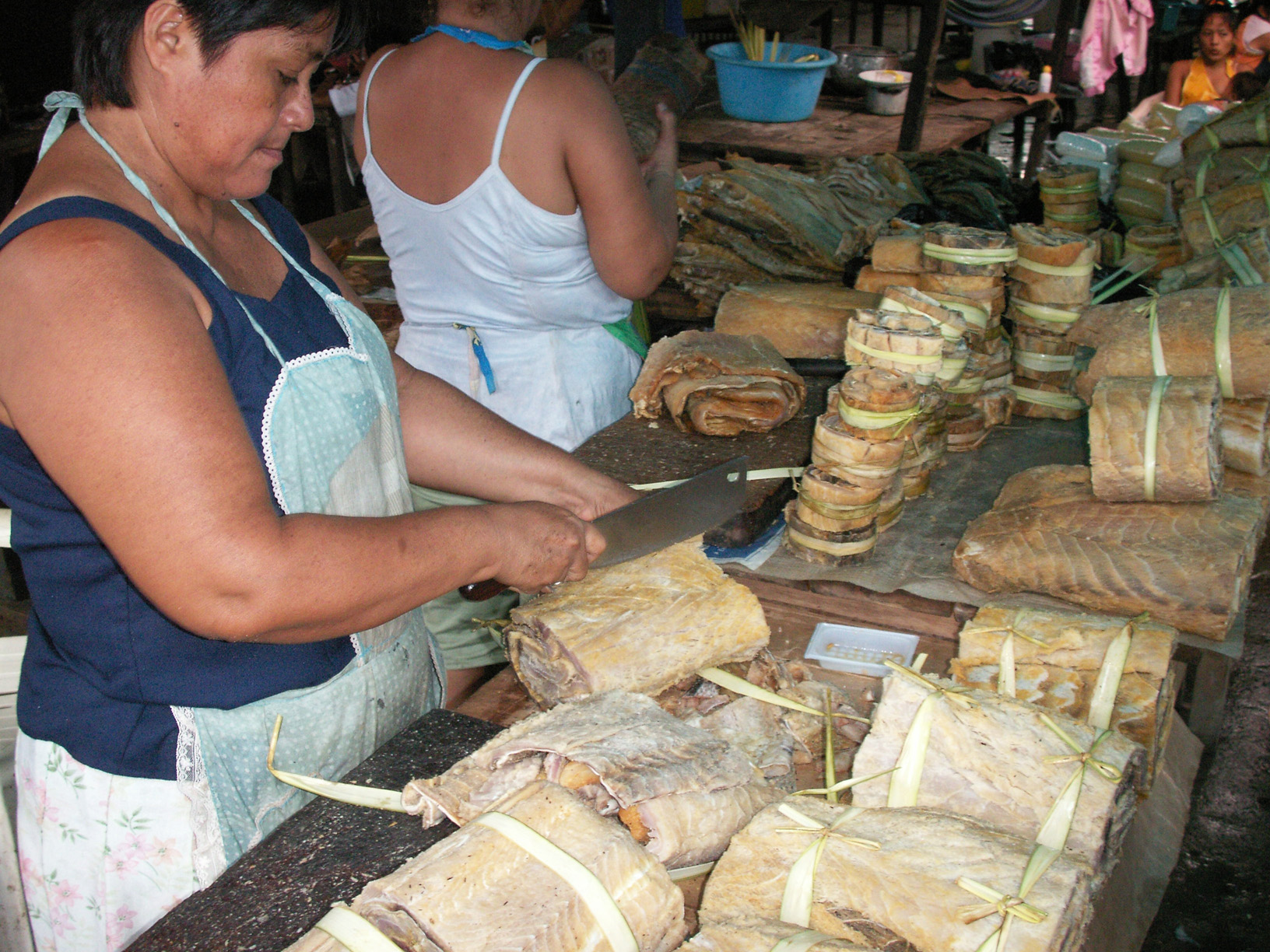
Salted paiche (Arapaima gigas) stall in Mercado de Bele, Iquitos, Peru

== Use by humans ==
Both Arapaima and Heterotis are farmed in their respective regions as relatively large and hardy food-fish.

== Etymology ==
The family is named after the monotypic genus Arapaima, whose name derives from the Tupi-Guyarana indigenous name for Arapaima gigas.

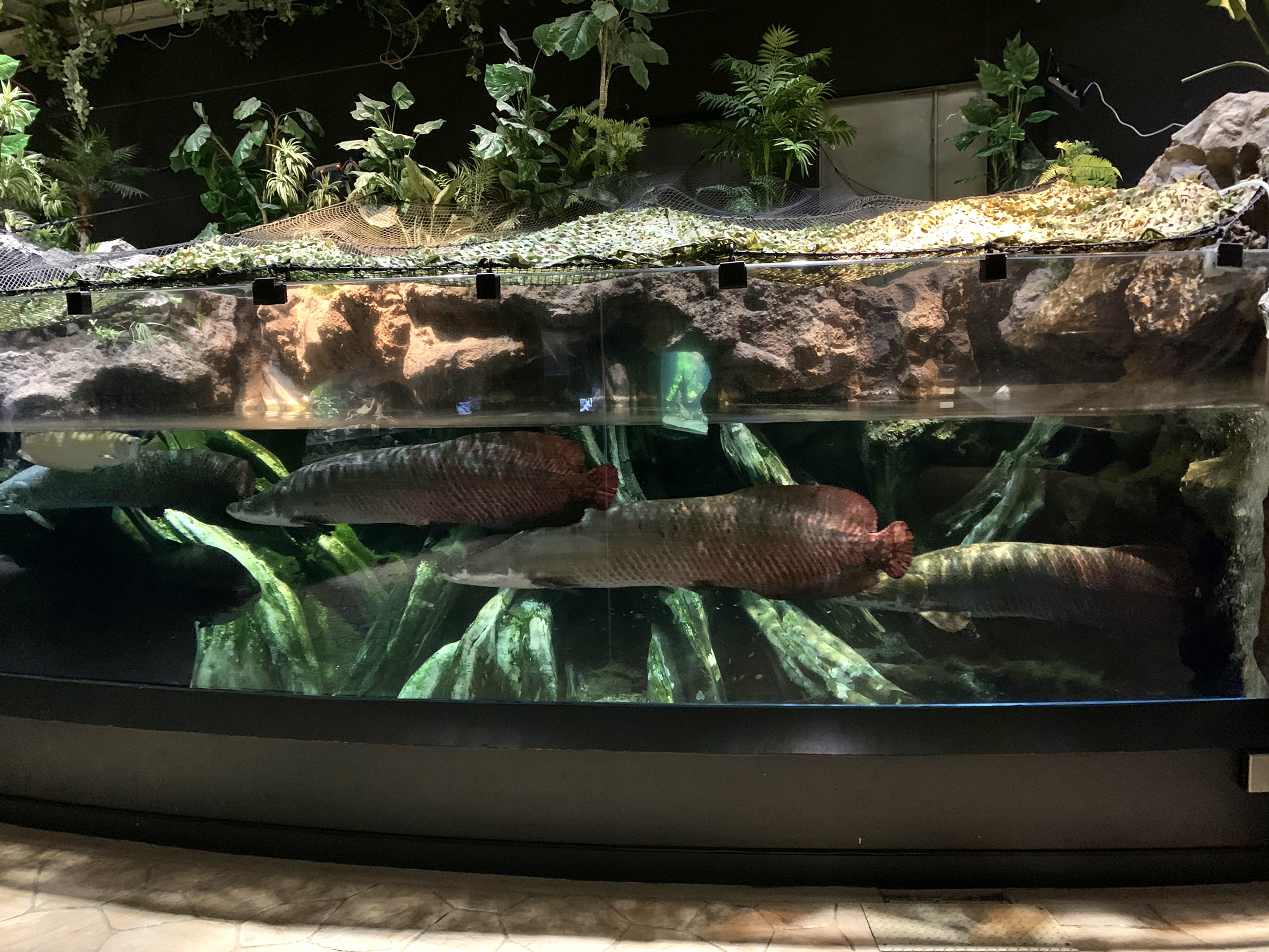
A. gigas in aquarium

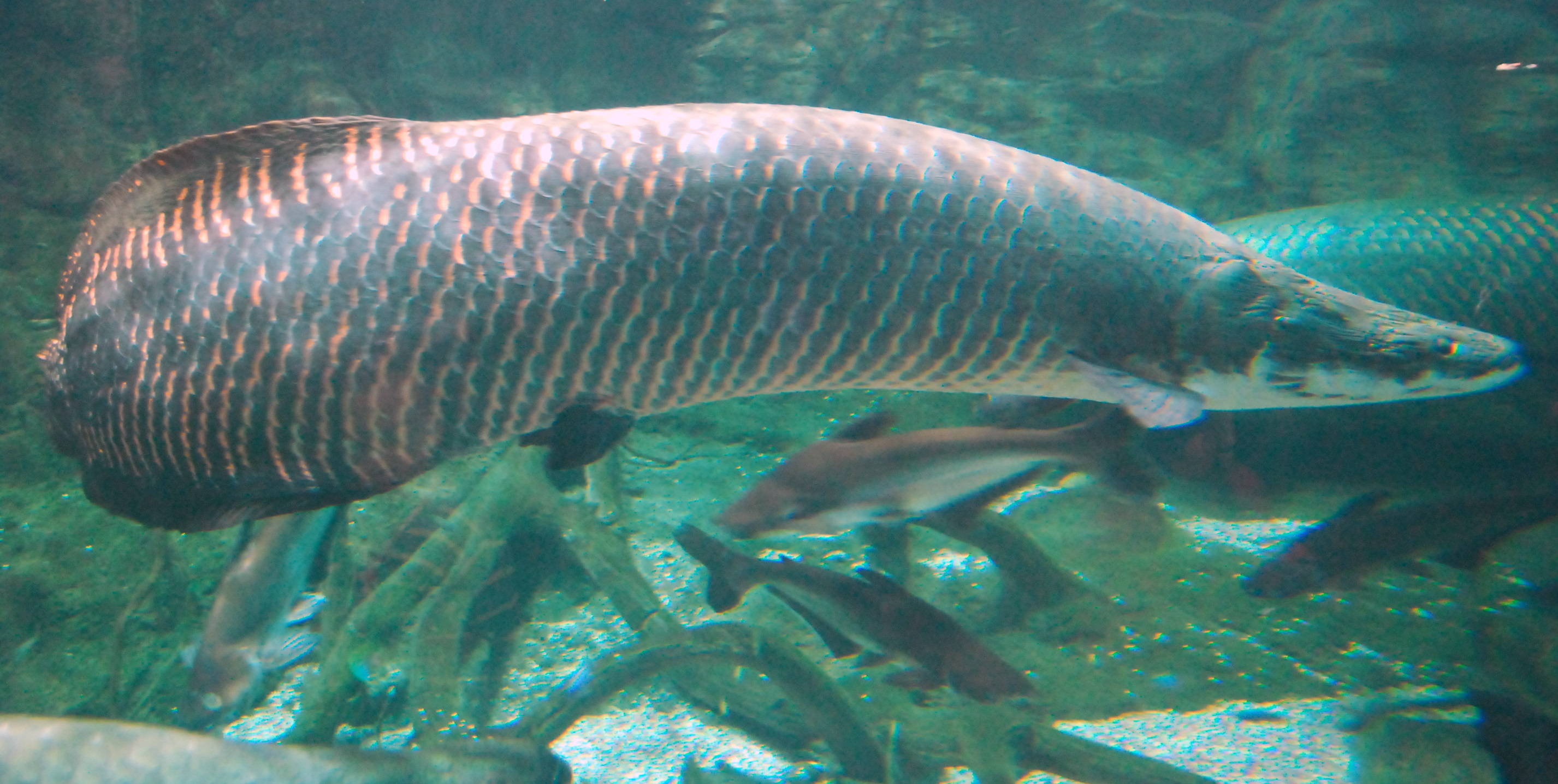
A. gigas in aquarium

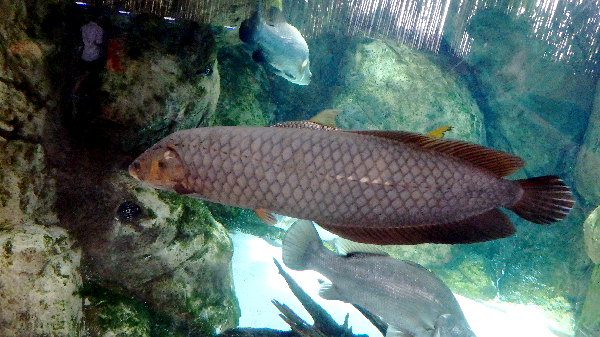
H. niloticus in aquarium

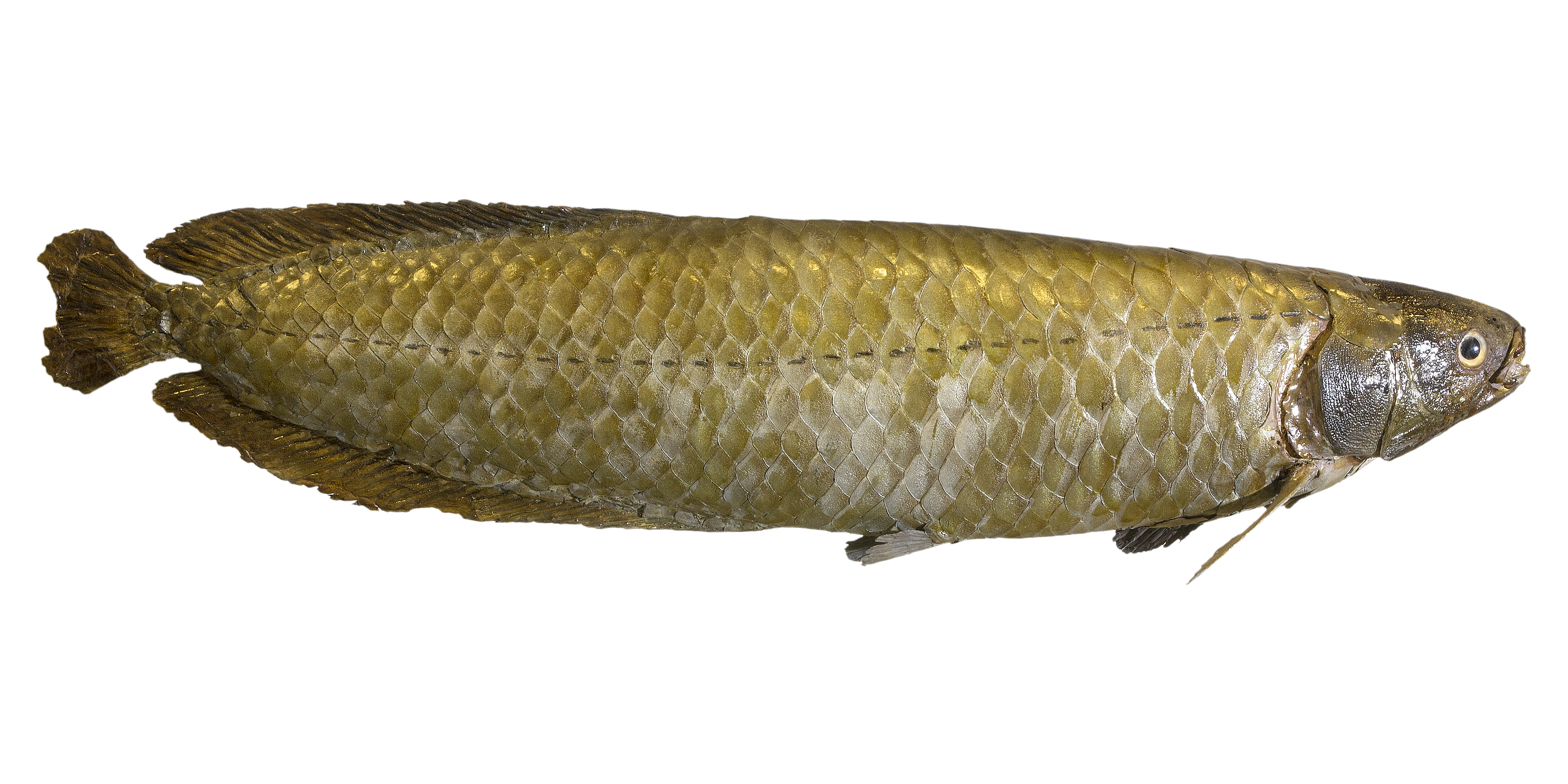
Museum specimen of H. niloticus
