= Arapaima mapae =

Conservation status
- Data Deficient (IUCN 3.1)

Scientific classification
- Kingdom: Animalia
- Phylum: Chordata
- Class: Actinopterygii
- Order: Osteoglossiformes
- Family: Arapaimidae
- Genus: Arapaima
- Species: A. mapae

Binomial name
- Arapaima mapae (Valenciennes, 1847)
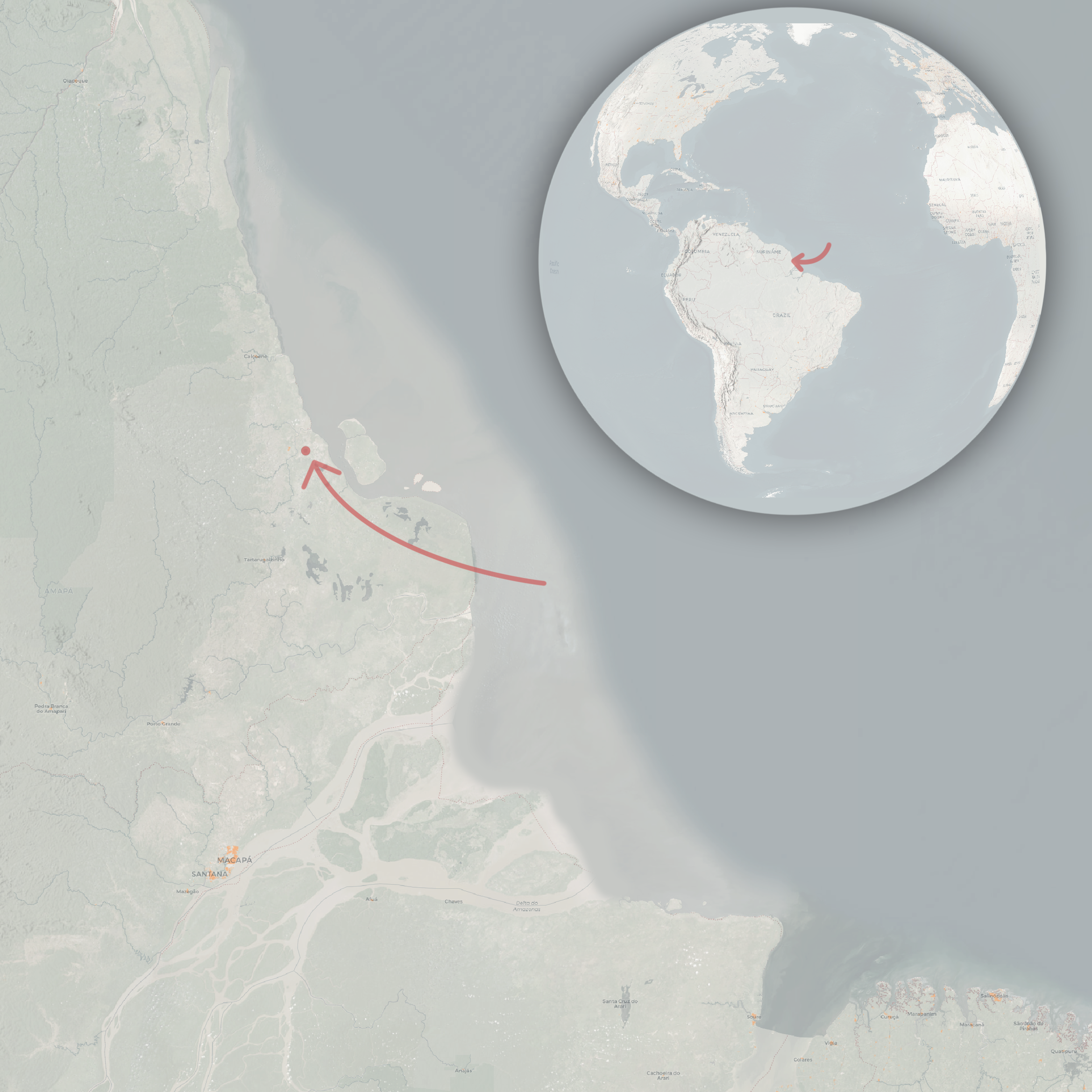
- The collection location of the holotype of Arapaima mapae. No other specimens have been recorded.

Synonyms
- Vastres mapae Valenciennes, 1847

Species of fish

Arapaima mapae is a species of freshwater fish endemic to Brazil, where it is known only from Lago do Amapá in Amapá State.

It is a member of the arapaimas, a genus of air-breathing fish that contains some of the world's largest freshwater fish. It is known only from a single holotype collected in 1837, which was purchased by a French army officer from an indigenous trader in French Guiana, and later described as a new species by Achille Valenciennes. A 2013 review of wild-caught Arapaima specimens worldwide found sufficient morphological evidence to classify it as a distinct species.

There have been no efforts to rediscover the species and assess the status of the population; for this reason, it is classified as data deficient on the IUCN Red List. However, potential threats to this species include overfishing, habitat degradation, and the introduction of alien arapaima species.
