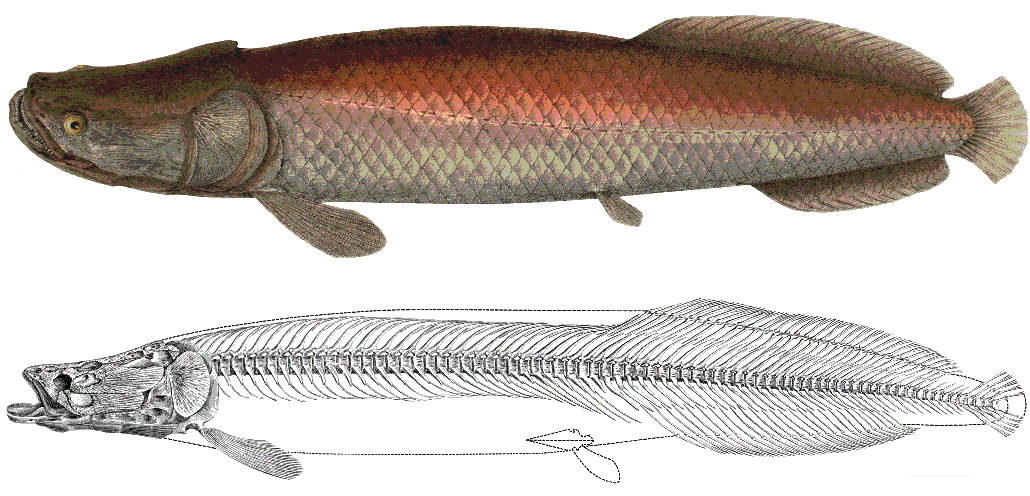

Conservation status
- Data Deficient (IUCN 3.1)

Scientific classification
- Kingdom: Animalia
- Phylum: Chordata
- Class: Actinopterygii
- Order: Osteoglossiformes
- Family: Arapaimidae
- Genus: Arapaima
- Species: A. agassizii

Binomial name
- Arapaima agassizii (Valenciennes, 1847)

Synonyms
- Vastres agassizii Valenciennes, 1847

= Arapaima agassizii =

Species of fish

Arapaima agassizii is a species of freshwater fish endemic to Brazil. It is a member of the arapaimas, a genus of air-breathing fish that contains some of the world's largest freshwater fish.

It is known only from a single now-lost holotype collected between 1817 and 1820 from an unspecified region in the lowlands of the Brazilian Amazon, and an 1847 description by Achille Valenciennes, based on notes & illustrations of the specimen made by Johann Baptist von Spix and Louis Agassiz in 1829. The holotype skeleton was kept at the Bavarian State Collection of Zoology and destroyed during World War II, but the species was redescribed in a 2013 review of wild-caught Arapaima specimens worldwide on the basis of Valenciennes' description, with the review finding sufficient morphological evidence that A. agassizii is distinct from all other species of arapaima.

Due to the lack of knowledge about the origins of the specimen and the present status of the species, it is classified as data deficient by the IUCN Red List.
