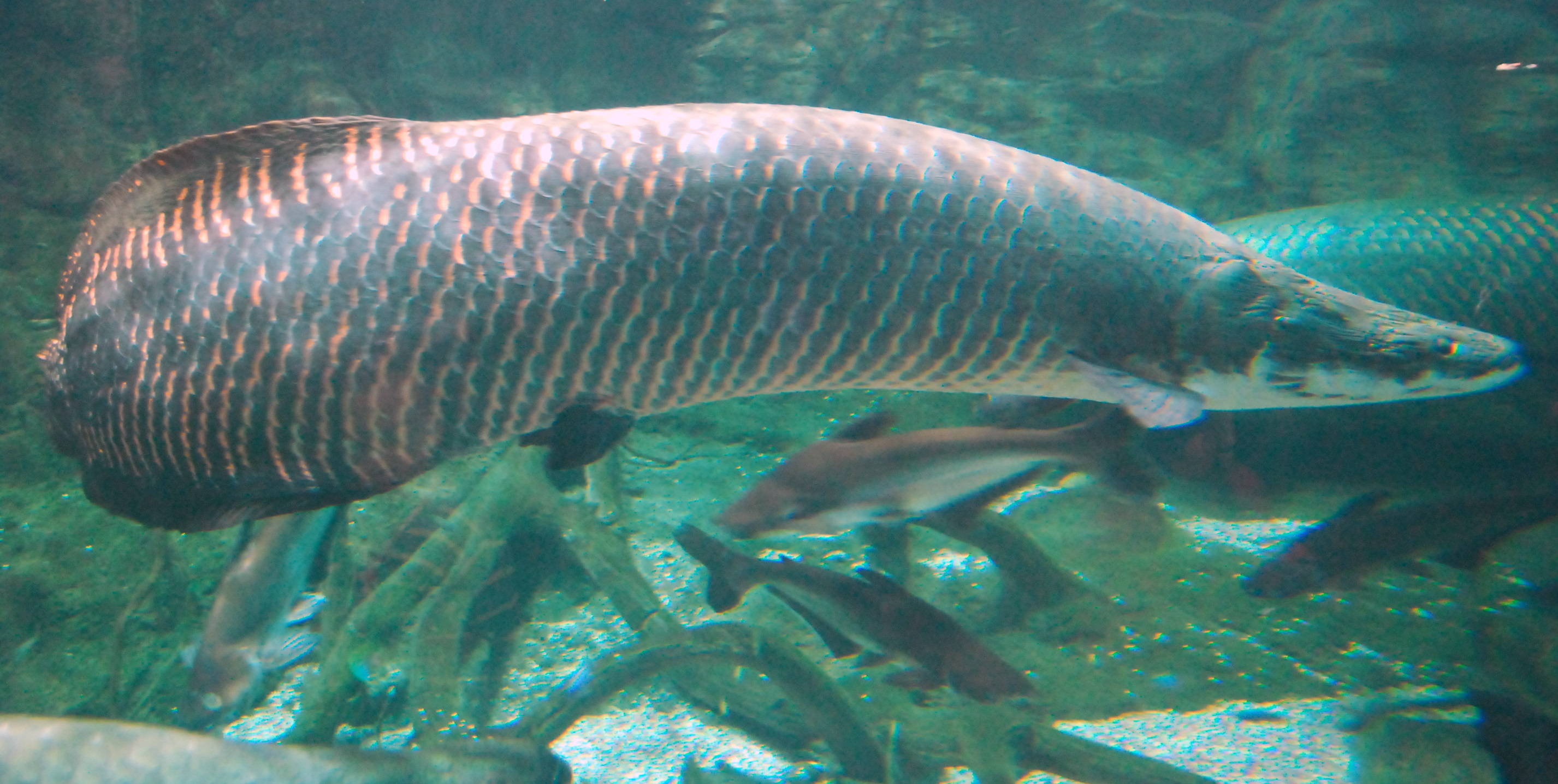
- Beijing Aquarium, China

Conservation status
- Data Deficient (IUCN 2.3)
- CITES Appendix II

Scientific classification
- Kingdom: Animalia
- Phylum: Chordata
- Class: Actinopterygii
- Division: Teleostei
- Order: Osteoglossiformes
- Family: Arapaimidae
- Genus: Arapaima
- Species: A. gigas

Binomial name
- Arapaima gigas (Schinz, 1822)

Synonyms
- Sudis gigas Schinz, 1822; Sudis gigas G. Cuvier, 1829 (ambiguous); Arapaima gigas (G. Cuvier, 1829) (ambiguous); Sudis pirarucu Spix & Agassiz, 1829 (ambiguous); Vastres mapae Valenciennes, 1847; Vastres cuvieri Valenciennes, 1847; Vastres agassizii Valenciennes, 1847; Vastres arapaima Valenciennes, 1847

= Arapaima gigas =

Species of fish

Arapaima gigas, also known simply as Arapaima, pirarucu, or paiche, is a species of arapaima native to the basin of the Amazon River. Once believed to be the sole species in the genus, it is among the largest freshwater fish. It is the best-known species of Arapaimas.

== Taxonomy ==
Arapaima gigas was originally regarded as the only species in the genus Arapaima (monotypic), but the subsequent identification of further species, together with the rarity of specimens and the loss of several type specimens, has led to some uncertainty regarding classification within the genus and the identity of described individuals. Recently, some studies have added extra species to the genus due to common morphological features, including Arapaima leptosoma and Arapaima agassizii. These speciation events may have occurred due to evidence of "long-distance marine or geodispersal" from similar morphological traits in both fossilized and living specimen within the genus. Overall, it is unclear if Arapaima gigas truly is the only species in its genus.

A. gigas swimming in captivity

== Description ==
The species is among the largest known freshwater fish, commonly measuring 200 cm (79 in) and reportedly exceptionally reaching lengths of up to 450 cm (15 ft). Adults may weigh up to 200 kg (440 lb). Of the total body weight, head weight is typically 10.3% to 12.8%.

It is an ancient fish, belonging to a group of primitive carnivorous bony-tongued fishes. A. gigas has a streamlined body with dorsal and anal fins set well back towards the tail. While the body is mainly gray to gray-green, its Brazilian local name pirarucu derives from an indigenous word for "red fish", thought to refer to either the red flecks on the scales towards the tail, or the reddish-orange color of its meat. Red coloration typically shows up in males after sexual maturation, with up to 70% of the total body plan in males having red coloration.

The fish have "flexible, armor-like scales" made up of "a hard, mineralized outer layer" and "a tough-but-flexible inner layer" that help protect it from attacks by piranhas. The scales, which are typically 5–7cm but can reach 10cm in larger individuals, are built from collagen fibers in a layered structure. On the body, they overlap each other to form the armor-like characteristic.

== Distribution and history ==
A. gigas is native to freshwater in the basin of the Amazon River and Tocantins–Araguaia (Brazil) river basins; it is known to occur in Brazil and Peru. In Bolivia and Peru it is known as paiche, and is considered an invasive species in most parts, affecting local native species and the ecosystem. Other small populations have been found in the Iquitos region of Peru, and four distinct rivers in Ecuador, Colombia and Guyana.

Its populations are increasing and becoming more common in its non-native range, yet is rapidly declining in its native range. It was first found in 1976, introduced into the Madre de Dios region in Peru, for aquaculture. In about a decade, arapaimas were found in Bolivian waters due to the connection of the Madre de Dios basin to the Beni River in Bolivia. Rising water of aquaculture ponds allowed fish to escape into the watershed and establishing populations outside of containment.

Current distribution in Bolivia is characterized by 70 registered distribution points, including small rivers, lagoons, and streams between the Beni and Madre de Dios (Peru) rivers. Historical reports of arapaima sightings started north near the border of Peru, then traveled downstream as populations began to establish and spatially separate. In less than 30 years, the species has invaded the Madre de Dios and Beni watersheds.

The species has been introduced to parts of East Asia, both for fishing purposes and accidentally. The fish are found in flooded forest areas where they reproduce during the wet season; they relocate to lakes after water levels drop. It is also distributed by ornamental aquaculture and commonly pet-traded in Europe, North America, South America, and Asia. There are fish farms in Thailand and Malaysia. It is particularly prominent in Java and Sumatra regions in Indonesia. Studies found some single individuals in freshwater or dead in shallow water. One finding recorded a total of 22 individuals in Surabaya, which is the second largest Indonesian city.

A 13-million-year-old fossil of arapaima (or very similar species) has been found in Colombia, in the Villavieja Formation, which dates from the Miocene epoch.

== Physiology ==
Average lifespan in captivity is 15–20 years. There is no sufficient evidence on lifespan in the wild.

A. gigas grows rapidly, reaching about 10kg in its first year, then at moderate growth rates once reaching sexual maturity, around 5 years of age or 1.65m length. Morphology changes occur as an individual undergoes the transition from water-breather to air-breather 8–9 days after hatch. During the transition to air-breathing, the structure of the gills changes, making them better adapted for ion absorption, but less able to undergo gas diffusion. Once developmental changes in the gills take place, the lamella is less recognizable. The adult gills are made up of smooth, column-shaped filaments. The kidneys have an important role in nitrogenous waste excretion in this species and are enlarged in adult fish.

Phenotypic sex of A. gigas juveniles is not differentiated, meaning the gonad cells can produce both sexes. In females, only the left ovary was developed which differs in size during the reproductive cycle. It increases as maturation occurs, then reduces after spawning. Females have a genital pore on their ventral (under) side that connects the reproductive organs with external environment to allow for mating. In males, only a left testis was developed, which was small and did not differ in size during the reproductive cycle. Both reproductive organs are unpaired and situated near the swim bladder. In some cases, right gonads were found but atrophic.

Both males and females have a gland-like secretory organ on the head, mostly used for communication with offspring and is therefore more prominent in males—who provide the majority of parental care. The secretion is made of 400 substances and consist of hormones, proteins, peptides and likely pheromones which also provides nutrients for fry (freshly hatched fish).

== Ecology ==
=== Breathing ===
A. gigas requires breathing surface air to supplement the oxygen it derives from the use of its gills, and as such, is dependent on surfacing every 5–15 minutes to loudly gulp air at the surface. As in other species in the genus, a modified swim bladder that contains lung-like tissue is used for this purpose.

=== Feeding ===
The species are specialized carnivores, feeding primarily on fish. Invertebrates are also part of their diet. Juveniles prefer insects and fish larvae until fully grown. Seasonal growth is observed due food selectivity and strong seasonal changes in food availability. They also consume birds, mammals, fruits, and seeds on the water surface. Prey fish families include Callichthyidae, Loricariidae, Pimelodidae, and Heptapteridae.

=== Migration ===
The species undergoes seasonal lateral migration between river channels and floodplains driven by low depth and low current velocity. The lake and forest habitats seem to be preferred. When water levels are high, A. gigas fish migrated to flooded forests with increasingly rising levels. When water levels decline, fish begin to migrate towards lower levels of flooded forests, then to lakes where they stay when it is physically isolated due to low water levels. Migration to the flooded forest is a mechanism for feeding and parental care, with prey (for both adults and offspring) having increased densities in this habitat at the high-water season. During high water levels, A. gigas populations have high densities in lakes, due to increased survival rates (physical safety), feeding (adequate feeding rates), and promoting reproduction (courtship and mating activities).

=== Spawning ===
Sexual maturity is reached at 5 years, and female fecundity increases with each year. Spawning occurs in lakes and river channels during the time of low water levels (August to March) in small, separate clutches with an average of less than 500 eggs in each batch. Parents have been observed using their mouths to dig holes in the substrate to create a nest for eggs. Small, batched spawning strategy is thought to derive from the unpredictability of the environment, as it lowers the total loss of fertilized eggs due to natural events. In the event of reproductive failures, pairs may breed again for better success. Males remain to protect the offspring for three to six months. Body mass and muscle yield does not differ during sexual maturation cycles, unlike many other fish species. Red pigment among males is thought to be used for sexual selection as it is a proxy for age.

== Conservation ==
A. gigas' genetic diversity has been greatly impacted due to habitat loss, environmental degradation, and commercial overexploitation in native fish stocks, as extreme as causing bottlenecks in some populations. In its native ecosystems, it helps to cycle nutrients and energy. Loss of migration paths from anthropogenic actions separates local populations and forms refuges that can persevere, but without the exchange of genes. The species has in the past been heavily impacted by overfishing, exacerbated by their need to surface for breathing every 5 to 15 minutes, causing them to be easy to harpoon. It is classified under the IUCN as "Data Deficient" due to a lack of detailed information about population developments. In addition, Arapaima gigas is listed in the CITES Appendix II since 1975, forcing legal harvest to be monitored under intergovernmental control with a management plan. Furthermore, in 2004, it was published in the Brazilian List of Overexploited or Threatened with Over Exploitation Aquatic Invertebrates and Fishes. There are reports that local populations have become extinct in certain areas of Brazil and Peru.

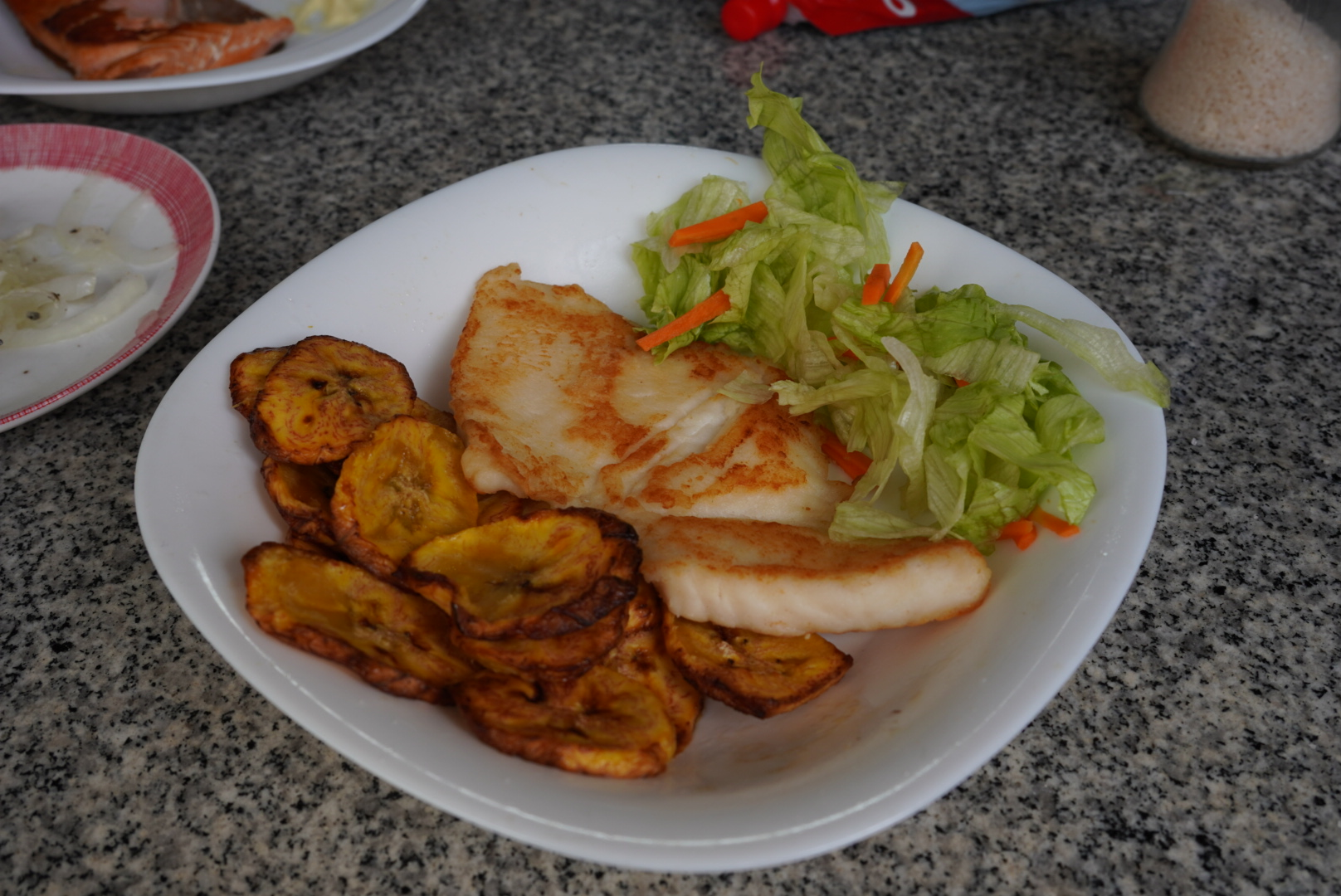
Grilled arapaima, served with plantains, lettuce and carrots

Aquaculture has further threatened diversity through transportation of specimens over hundreds of kilometers. This can cause homogenized genes and, in some cases, wipe out locally adapted populations. A study of "Genetic Diversity of Arapaima gigas in the Araguaia-Tocantins basin estimated by ISSR marker" by Vitorino, et al. found that low heterozygosity existed in populations that underwent bottleneck scenarios, which is assumed to be from inbreeding and low reproductive success. Low heterozygosity can detriment future evolutionary potential of species. The study suggests "periodic monitoring to check eventual reducing levels of population genetic variability and the establishment of management plan." So far, no technology exists to manipulate the reproduction of the species.

Arapaima fishing was banned outright in Brazil from 1996 to 1999, due to declining populations; since then, both subsistence and commercial fishing have been permitted in specially designated areas, and a sophisticated sustainable management strategy has led to massive recovery of stocks, from 2,500 in 1999 to over 170,000 in 2017. However, there are still large markets of illegal arapaima fishing in the lower Amazon, with about 77% of its harvest coming from unlawful practices. Furthermore, local community-based initiatives have been established to protect waterways for natural reproduction and reestablishment of populations.

== Invasion ==
Arapaima gigas follows what is coined as the "Biodiversity Conservation Paradox", where a species has become endangered in its native habitat yet becoming growingly invasive in nonnative home ranges. Previously discussed in the "Distribution" section of this page, aquaculture for both fish meat and ornamental markets has caused the spread of the fish where it has become invasive and threaten the integrity of ecosystems. In some parts of Brazil, juvenile individuals are captured and bred in captivity, then dispersed and exported by traders for aquaculture profit.

=== South America ===
For Bolivia, the Arapaima as an invasive species is considered a threat to local native species according to reports. Various reports show a correlation between the spreading of Arapaima and the decline in numbers of native fish species in parts of the Bolivian Amazon. Effects on local fish species populations and on fishing behaviors vary strongly by region. A joint study of the Bolivian government and different research organizations from 2017 points out the necessity to further evaluate the complex environmental and socioeconomic impact of Arapaima in the country.

Oftentimes, introduction comes from accidentally escaped aquaculture groups, or for purposeful control of undesirable prey in parts of Brazil and south-eastern Peru. As discussed in the Distribution section, once established in the Madre de Dios region in Peru, populations moved to Bolivian waters through connections through the Beni River watershed. The Beni River has few natural barriers, theoretically allowing the arapaima populations to continue evading further south and terrorizing native fishes in Bolivia and even western Brazil.

=== Indonesia ===
As an invasive species in Indonesia, there may be longer term impact, however populations are not yet established enough to significantly affect native species. However, it can be assumed that risks would be similar to events observed in Bolivia and Brazil such as decrease in native populations and fishing stock. Some fishermen even say that these large bony-tongued fish damage their nets, therefore causing socio-economic losses. One study specifically focused on A. gigas in Indonesia found no fry or juveniles in the wild, but one female was found with eggs. This, with the finding of climate matching, causes the inability to rule out successful reproduction and establishment in the region. For now, it is suggested to understand the reproduction and ecology in introduced arapaimas in Indonesia in order to properly propose management strategies and fishing/trading sanctions.

== Cultural importance ==
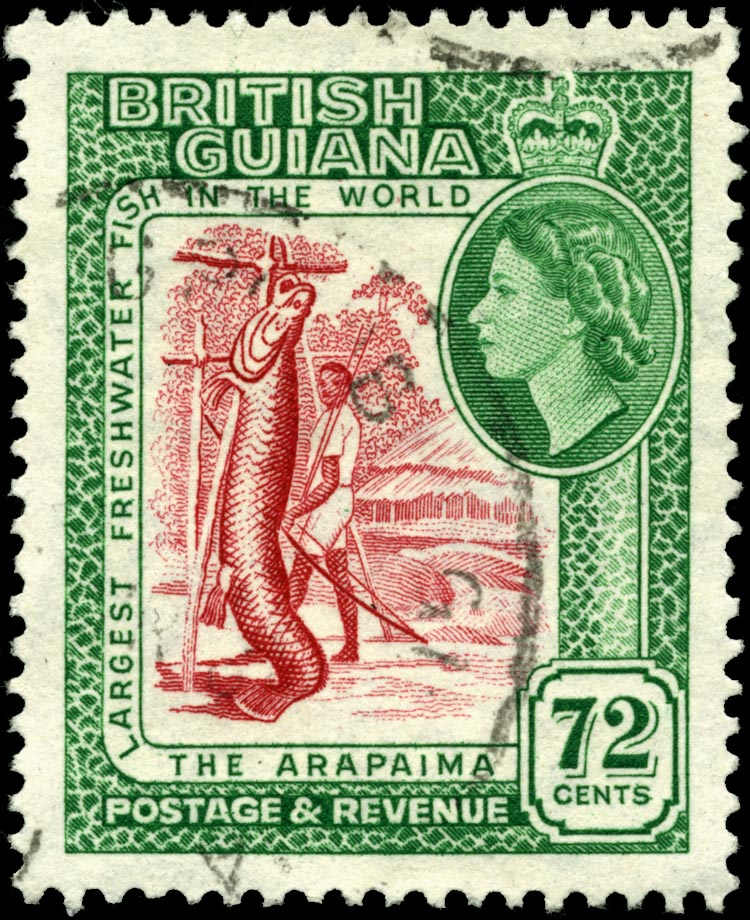
1954 postage stamp of British Guiana with Arapaima

Arapaima gigas are exploited for fish meat markets and ornamental fishing which can include production, as it has been noted that the characteristic armored scales are commonly used as nail files in areas around the Amazon basin. Fishing and aquaculture provides many jobs in the region, in addition to the fish being an important traditional food for local communities.
