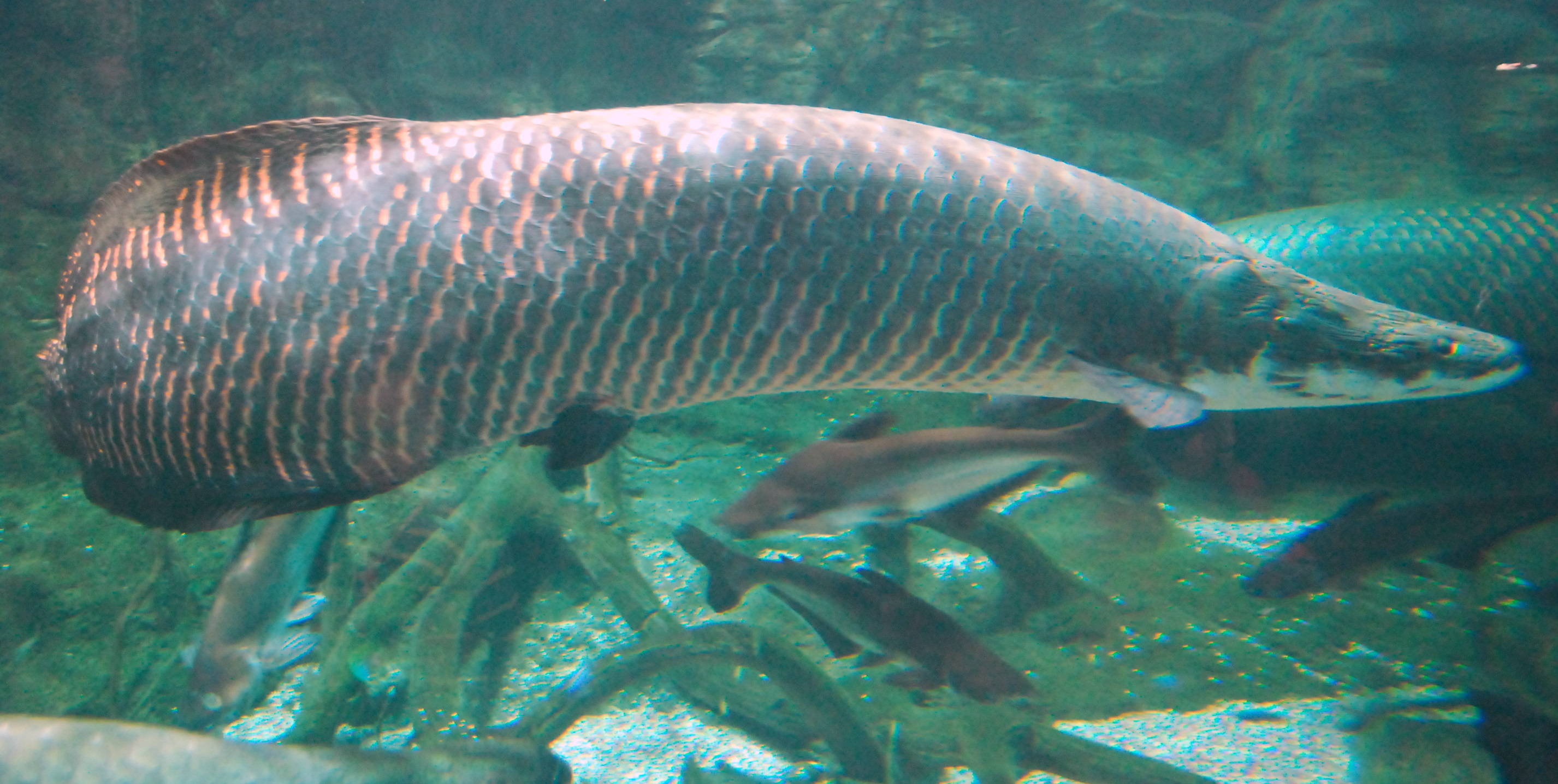
- Arapaima gigas at Beijing Aquarium

Scientific classification
- Kingdom: Animalia
- Phylum: Chordata
- Class: Actinopterygii
- Division: Teleostei
- Order: Osteoglossiformes
- Family: Arapaimidae
- Genus: Arapaima; J. P. Müller, 1843

Type species
- Sudis gigas Schinz, 1822

Species
- 4–5, see text

Synonyms
- Sudis G. Cuvier, 1816 (preoccupied); Vastres Valenciennes, 1847

= Arapaima =

Arapaima Temporal range: Aquitanian – recent

Genus of fish

The arapaima, pirarucu, or paiche is a large species of bonytongue in the genus Arapaima native to the Amazon and Essequibo basins of South America. Arapaima is the type genus of the subfamily Arapaiminae within the family Osteoglossidae. They are among the world's largest freshwater fish, reaching as much as 3 m (9.8 ft) in length. They are an important food fish. They have declined in the native range due to overfishing and habitat loss. In contrast, arapaima have been introduced to several tropical regions outside the native range (within South America and elsewhere), where they are sometimes considered invasive species. In Kerala, India, arapaima escaped from aquaculture ponds after floods in 2018. Its Portuguese name, pirarucu, derives from the Tupi language words pira and urucum, meaning "red fish".

Arapaima was traditionally regarded as a monotypic genus, but later, several species were distinguished. As a consequence of this taxonomic confusion, most earlier studies were done using the name A. gigas, but this species is only known from old museum specimens and the exact native range is unclear. The regularly seen and studied species is A. arapaima, although a small number of A. leptosoma also have been recorded in the aquarium trade. The remaining species are virtually unknown: A. agassizii from old detailed drawings (the type specimen itself was lost during World War II bombings) and A. mapae from the type specimen.

== Taxonomy ==
FishBase recognizes four species in the genus. In addition to these, evidence suggests that a fifth species, A. arapaima, should be recognized (this being the widespread, well-known species, otherwise included in A. gigas).

- Arapaima agassizii (Valenciennes, 1847) (Agassiz's arapaima)
- Arapaima gigas (Schinz, 1822) (pirarucu, arapaima)
- Arapaima leptosoma D. J. Stewart, 2013 (slender arapaima; Solimoes arapaima)
- Arapaima mapae (Valenciennes, 1847) (Mapa arapaima)

These fish are widely dispersed and do not migrate, which leads scientists to suppose that more species are waiting to be discovered in the depths of the Amazon Basin harbors. Sites such as these offer the likelihood of diversity.

== Morphology ==
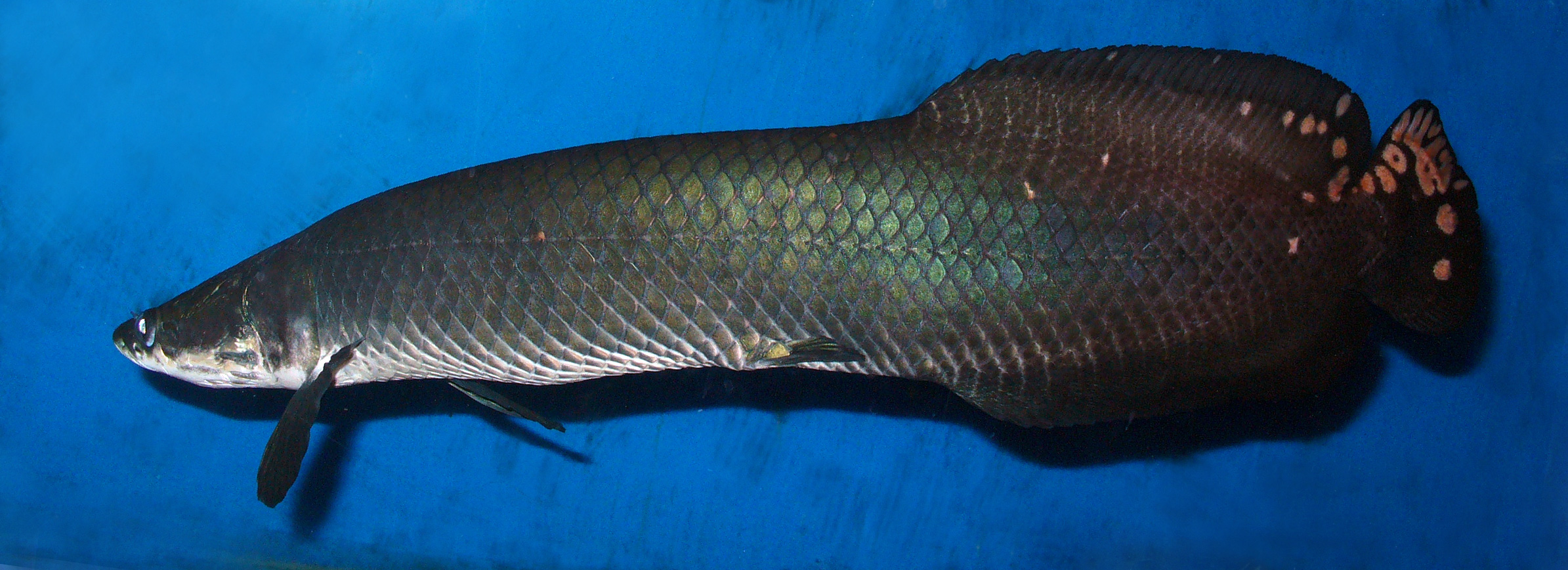
Arapaima leptosoma shown at its full length

Arapaima can reach lengths of more than 2 m (6 ft 7 in), in some exceptional cases even exceeding 2.6 m (8 ft 6 in) and over 100 kg (220 lb). The maximum recorded weight for the species is 200 kg (440 lb), while the longest recorded length verified was 3.07 m (10 ft 1 in). Anecdotal reports suggest that specimens as long as 4.57 m (15 ft 0 in) exist, but verification is deemed impossible, and thus considered questionable. As a result of overfishing, arapaima more than 2 m (6 ft 7 in) are seldom found in the wild.

The arapaima is torpedo-shaped, with large, blackish-green scales and red markings. It is streamlined and sleek, with its dorsal and anal fins set near its tail.

Arapaima scales have a mineralised, hard, outer layer with a corrugated surface under which lie several layers of collagen fibres in a Bouligand-type arrangement. In a structure similar to plywood, the fibres in each successive layer are oriented at large angles to those in the previous layer, increasing toughness. The hard, corrugated surface of the outer layer, and the tough internal collagen layers work synergistically to contribute to their ability to flex and deform while providing strength and protection—a solution that allows the fish to remain mobile while heavily armored. The arapaima has a fundamental dependence on surface air to breathe. In addition to gills, it has a modified and enlarged swim bladder, composed of lung-like tissue, which enables it to extract oxygen from the air.

== Ecology ==
The diet of the arapaima consists of fish, crustaceans, fruits, seeds, insects, and small land animals that walk near the shore (such as mammals and birds). The fish is an air breather, using its labyrinth organ, which is rich in blood vessels and opens into the fish's mouth, an advantage in oxygen-deprived water that is often found in the Amazon River. This fish is able to survive in oxbow lakes with dissolved oxygen as low as 0.5 ppm. In the wetlands of the Araguaia, one of the most important refuges for this species, it is the top predator in such lakes during the low-water season, when the lakes are isolated from the rivers and oxygen levels drop, rendering its prey lethargic and vulnerable.

Arapaima may leap out of the water if they feel constrained by their environment or harassed.

== Life history/behavior ==
=== Reproduction ===
Due to its geographic ranges, arapaima's lifecycle is greatly affected by seasonal flooding. Various pictures show slightly different coloring owing to colour changes when they reproduce. The arapaima lays its eggs when water levels are low or beginning to rise. They build a nest about 50 cm (20 in) wide and 15 cm (5.9 in) deep, usually in muddy-bottomed areas. As the water rises, the eggs hatch and the offspring have the flood season from May to August in which to prosper, such that yearly spawning is regulated seasonally.

=== Breeding ===
The arapaima male is a mouthbrooder, like the related Osteoglossum genus, meaning the young are protected in his mouth until they are older. The female arapaima helps to protect the male and the young by circling them and fending off potential predators.

In his book, Three Singles to Adventure, naturalist Gerald Durrell reported that in British Guyana, female arapaima had been seen secreting a white substance from a gland in the head, and that their young were seemingly feeding on the substance.

== Evolution ==
Some 23-million-year-old fossils of arapaima or a very similar species have been found in the Miocene Villavieja Formation of Colombia. Museum specimens are found in France, England, the United States, Brazil, Guyana, Ecuador and Perú. This makes them some of the oldest known species of freshwater fish.

== Relation to humans ==
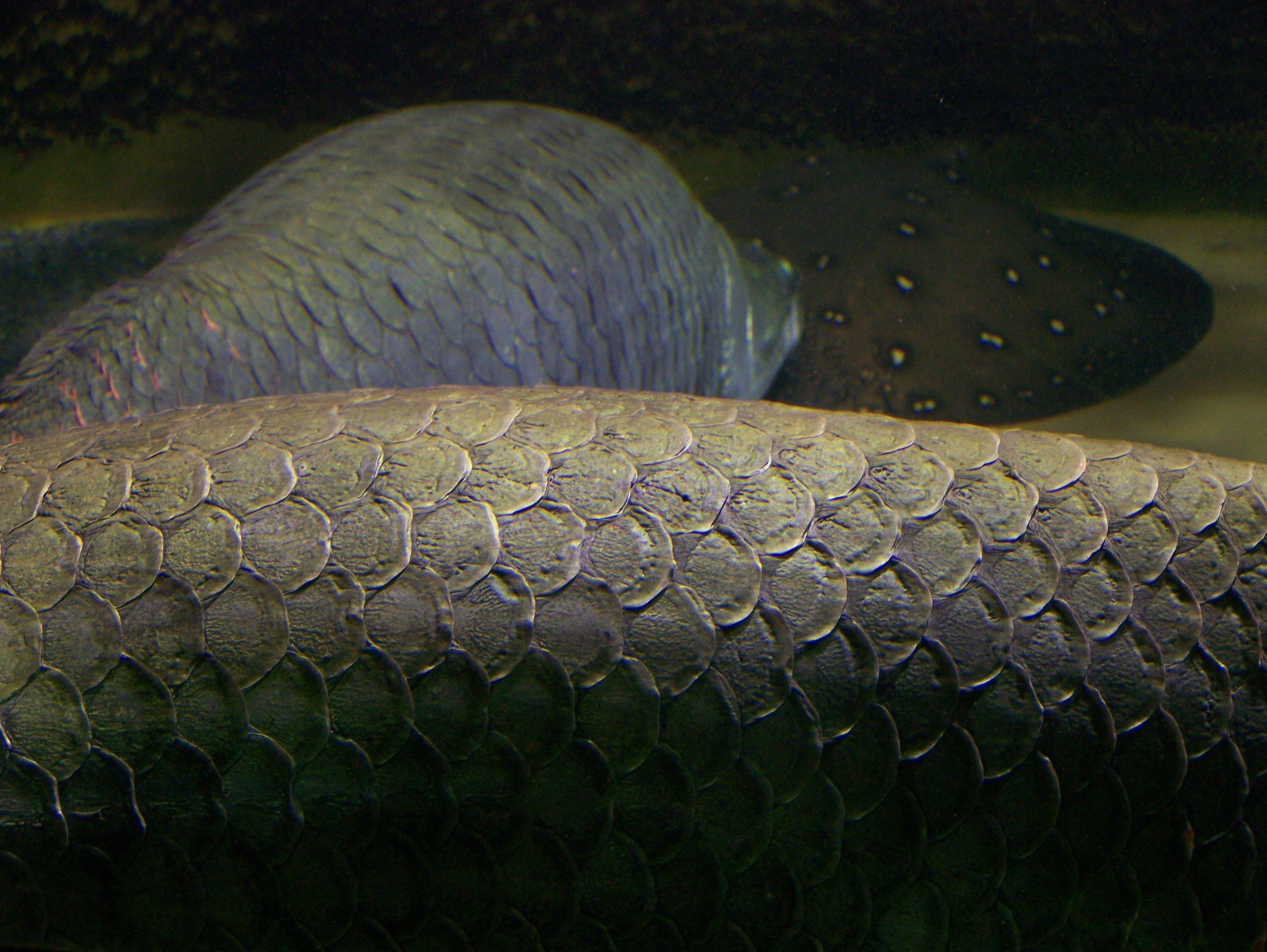
Closeup of scales

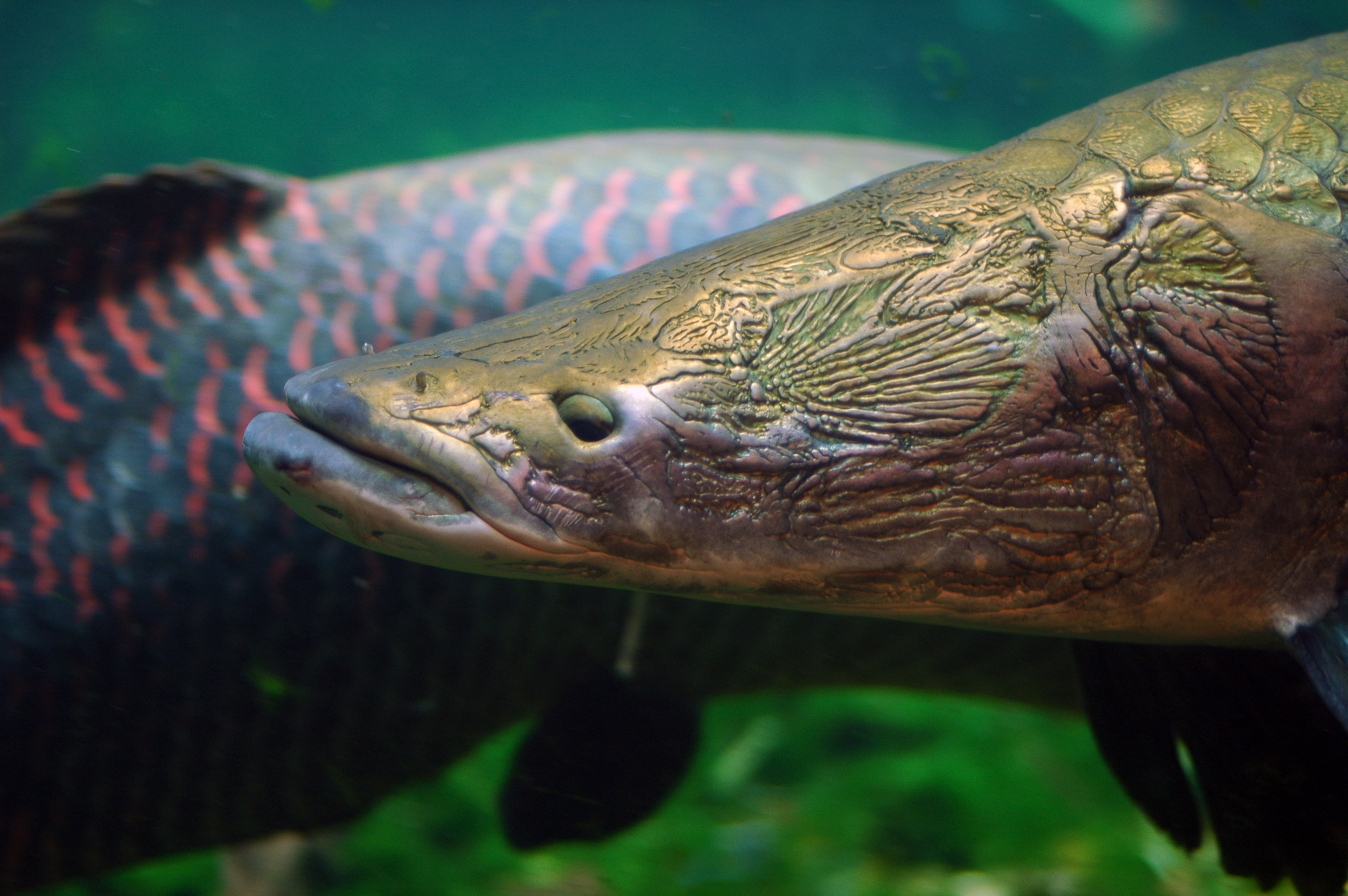
Arapaima or pirarucu close-up

Arapaima is exploited in many ways by local human populations.

Its tongue is thought to have medicinal qualities in South America. It is dried and combined with guarana bark, which is grated and mixed into water. Doses are given to kill intestinal worms. The bony tongue is used to scrape cylinders of dried guarana, an ingredient in some beverages, and the bony scales are used as nail files.

Arapaima produce boneless steaks and are considered a delicacy. In the Amazon region, locals often salt and dry the meat, rolling it into a cigar-style package that is then tied and can be stored without rotting, which is important in a region with little refrigeration. Arapaima are referred to as the "cod of the Amazon", and can be prepared in the same way as traditional salted cod.

Designers have begun using the skin of the arapaima as leather to make jackets, shoes, and handbags, and to cover furniture.

In July 2009, villagers around Kenyir Lake in Terengganu, Malaysia, reported sighting A. gigas. The "Kenyir monster", or "dragon fish" as the locals call it, was claimed to be responsible for the mysterious drowning of two men on 17 June.

In August 2018, India Times reported that arapaima has been spotted in the Chalakudy River, following floods in Kerala; their presence in India is attributed to illegal importation for fish farming.

The arapaima is depicted on both the flag and the seal of the Department of Ucayali, Peru.

=== Fishing ===
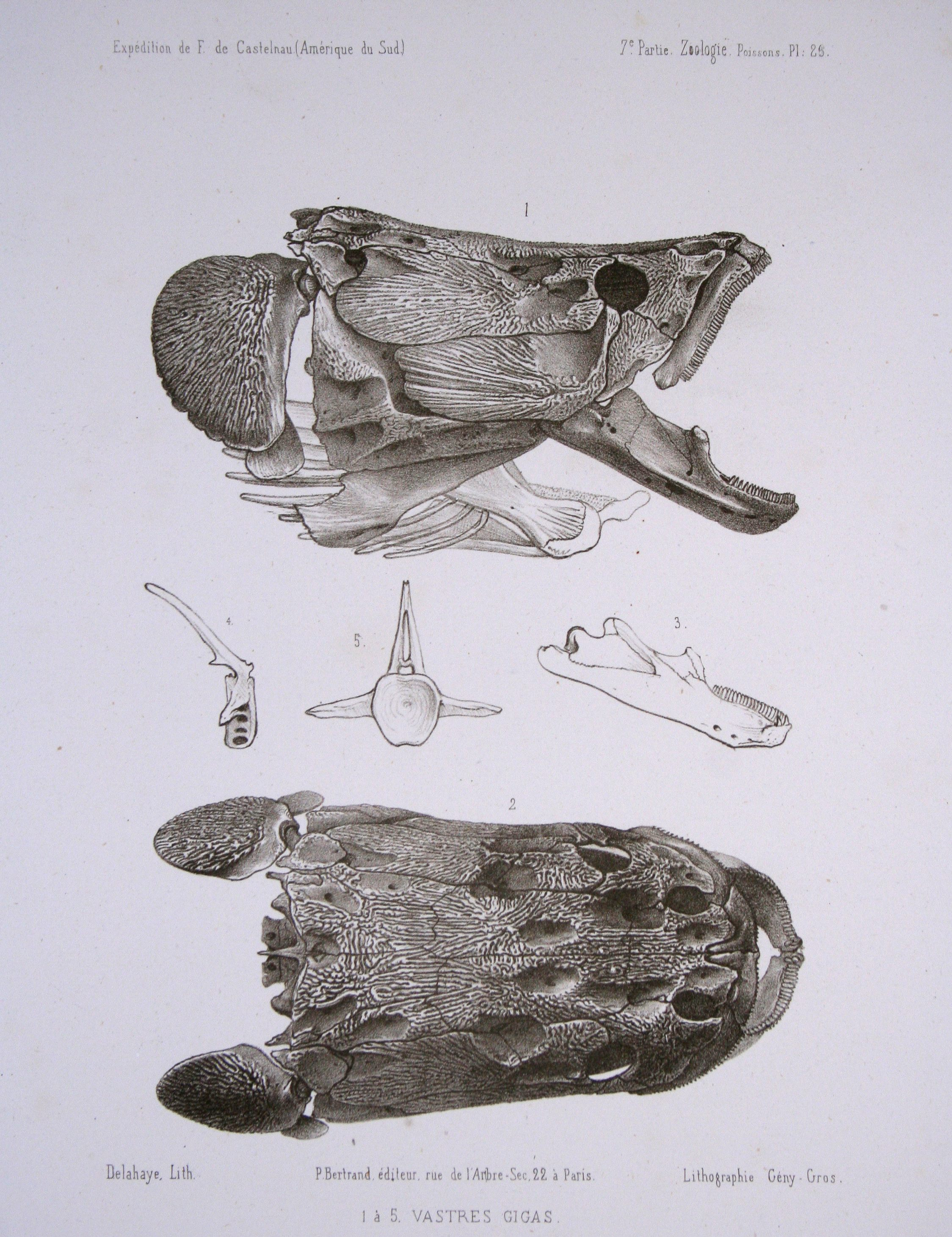
Skull from side and above

Wild arapaima are harpooned or caught in large nets. Since the arapaima needs to surface to breathe air, traditional arapaima fishermen harpoon them and then club them to death. An individual fish can yield as much as 70 kg (150 lb) of meat.

The arapaima was introduced for fishing in Thailand and Malaysia. Fishing in Thailand can be done in several lakes, where specimens over 150 kg (330 lb) are often landed and then released.

On 14 May 2020, a 30 kg (66 lb) specimen was found floating in the river in Angkor Wat area, Krovanh village, Sangkat Norkor Thom, Siem Reap, Cambodia; the locals said it was a rare fish, and not commonly seen in this area.

With catch-and-release after the fish is landed, it must be held for 5 minutes until it takes a breath. The fish has a large blood vessel running down its spine, so lifting the fish clear of the water for trophy shots can rupture this vessel, causing death.

=== Aquaculture ===
In 2013, Whole Foods began selling farm-raised arapaima in the United States as a cheaper alternative to halibut or Chilean sea bass.

In Thailand, the only legal breeding farm is located in Tambon Phrong Maduea, Amphoe Mueang Nakhon Pathom, Nakhon Pathom Province. This has been approved by both the Department of Fisheries and CITES since early 2018, and has been exporting them worldwide as an aquarium fish.

=== Conservation ===
Arapaima are particularly vulnerable to overfishing because of their size and because they must surface periodically to breathe. Some 7000 tons per year were taken from 1918 to 1924, the height of commercial arapaima fishing; demand led to farming of the fish by native ribeirinhos. As efforts at restricting catches were largely unsuccessful, arapaima fishing was banned outright in Brazil in 1996, due to declining populations. Indeed, a 2014 study found that the fish were depleted or overexploited at 93% of the sites examined and well-managed or unfished in only 7%; the fish appeared to be extirpated in 19% of these sites. The status of the arapaima population in the Amazon River Basin is unknown, hence it is listed on the IUCN red list as data deficient. Conducting a population census in so large an area is difficult, as is monitoring catches in a trade that was once largely unregulated. Since 1999, both subsistence and commercial fishing have been permitted in specially designated areas under a sophisticated sustainable management strategy. This approach has led to massive recovery of once-depleted stocks; in a sampling of 10 areas conducted using traditional counting methods, the population was found to have grown from 2,500 in 1999 to over 170,000 in 2017.

Colombia only bans fishing and consumption of the arapaima between 1 October and 15 March, during breeding season.

== Gallery ==
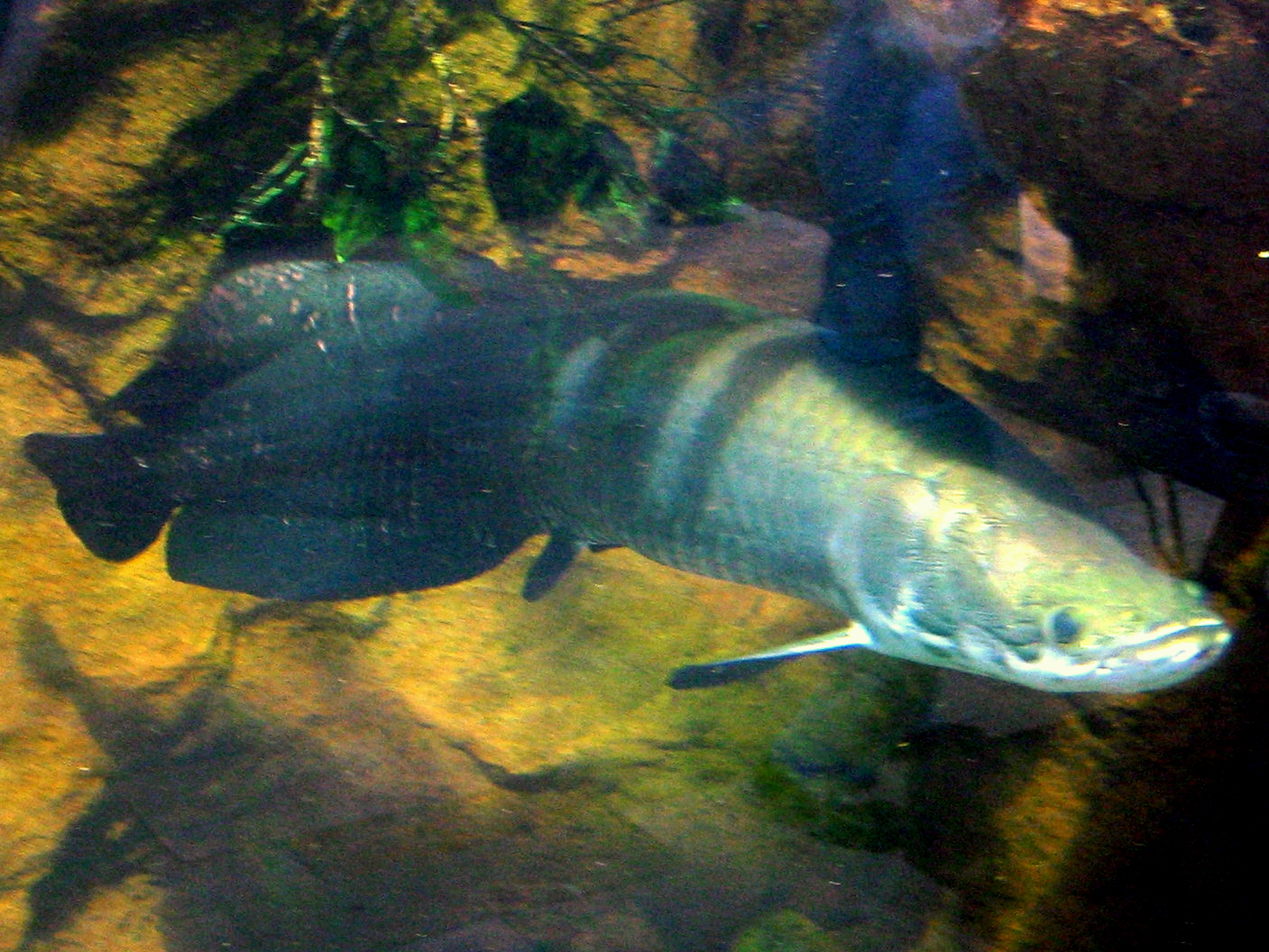
Arapaima at the Shedd Aquarium

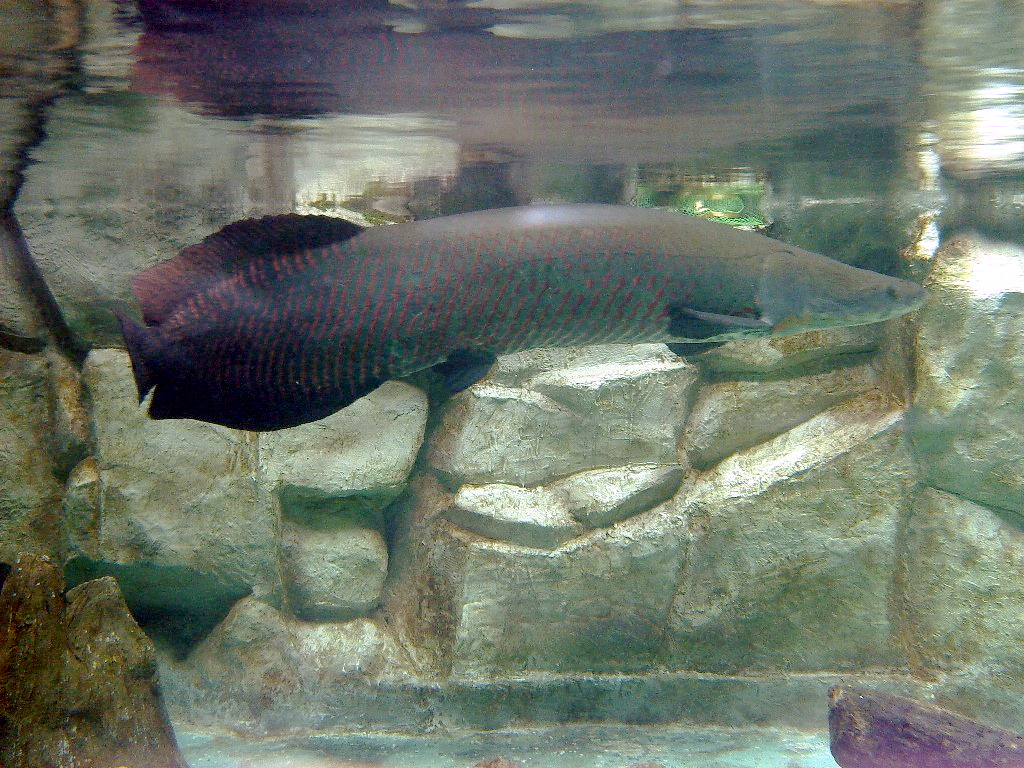
Arapaima at the Manila Ocean Park

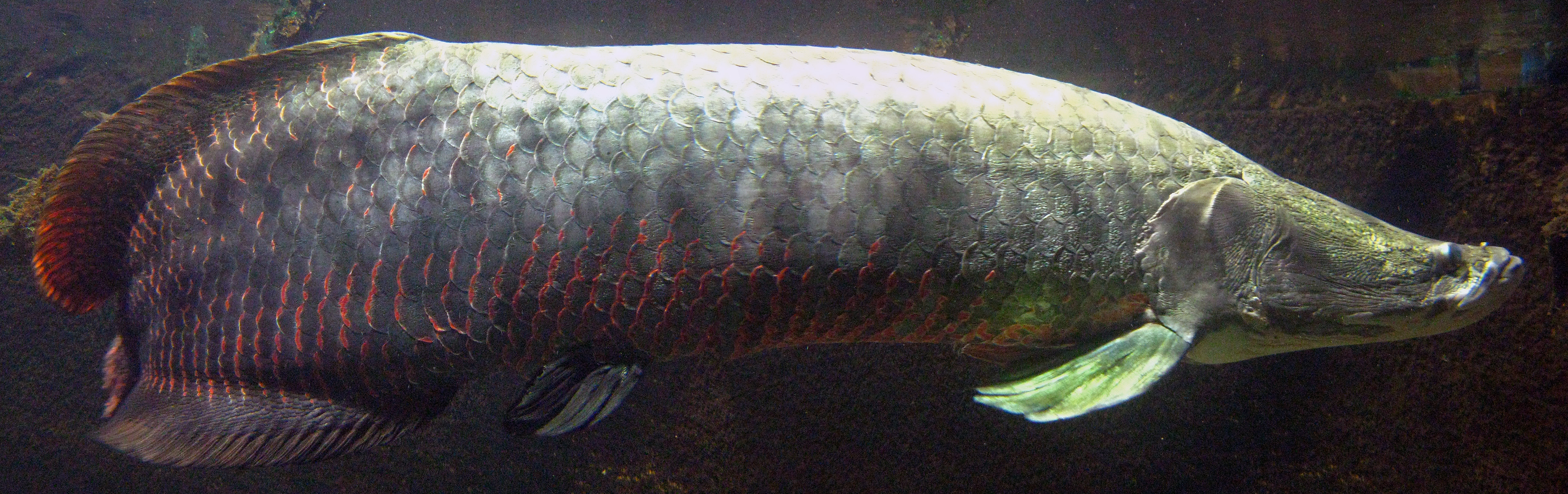
Arapaima at the Cologne Zoological Garden

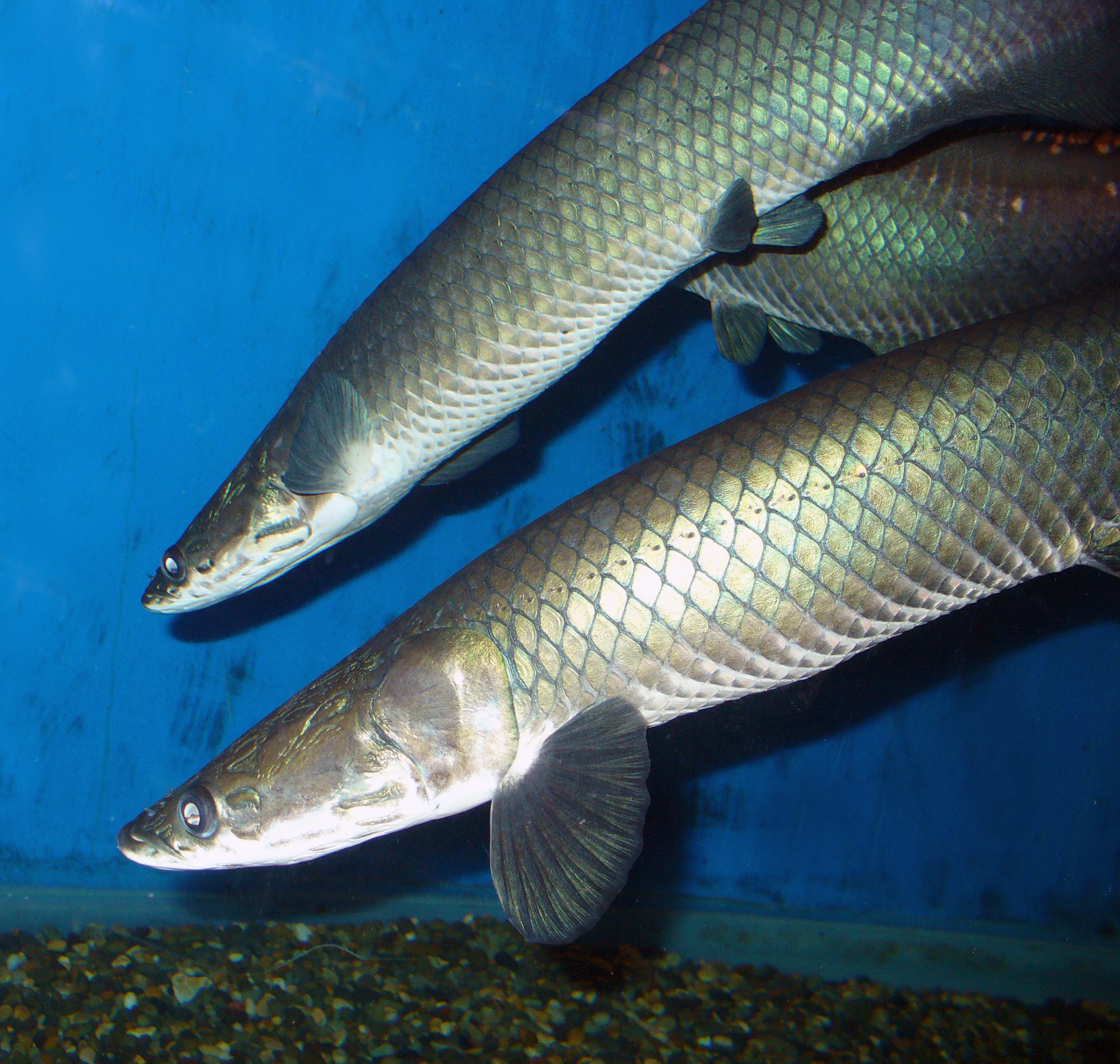
Arapaima leptosoma at the zoo (sea aquarium) in Sevastopol

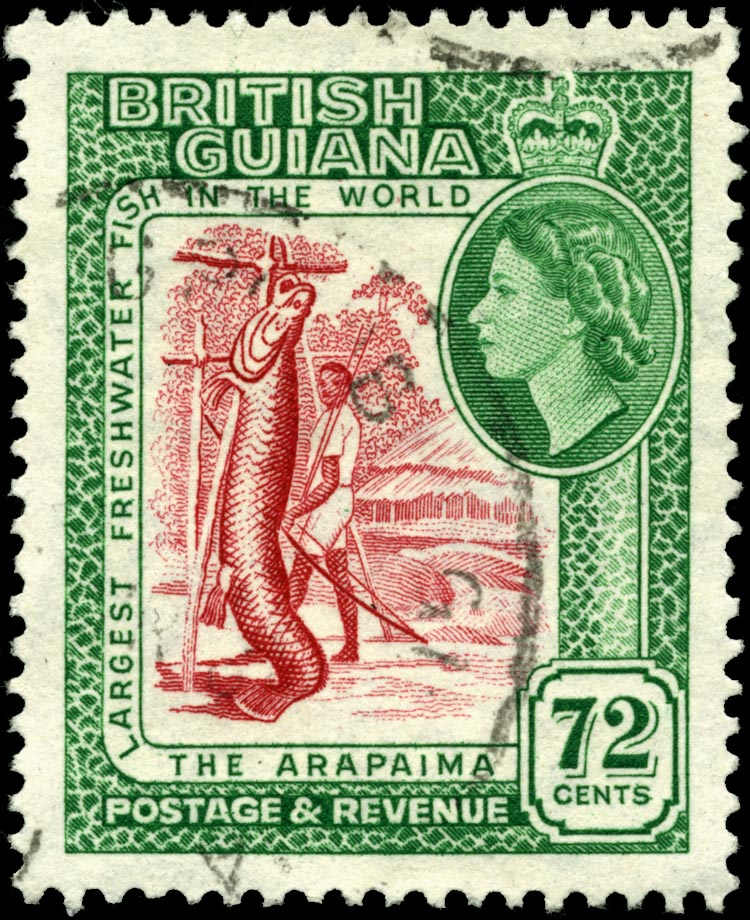
Arapaima depicted on a 1954 postage stamp of British Guiana

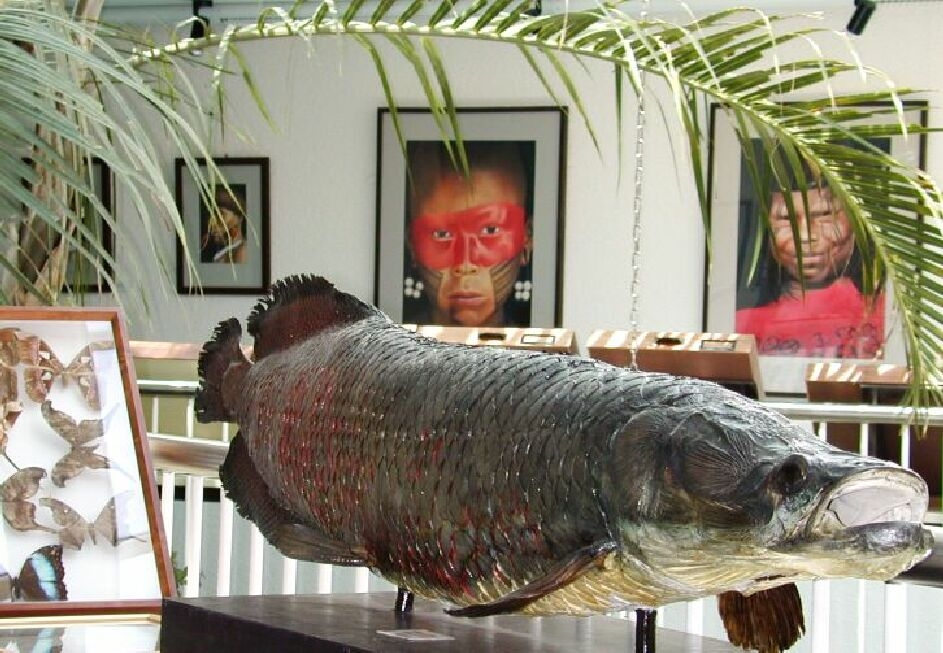
Specimen at a 2002 exhibition at the Bavarian State Collection of Zoology

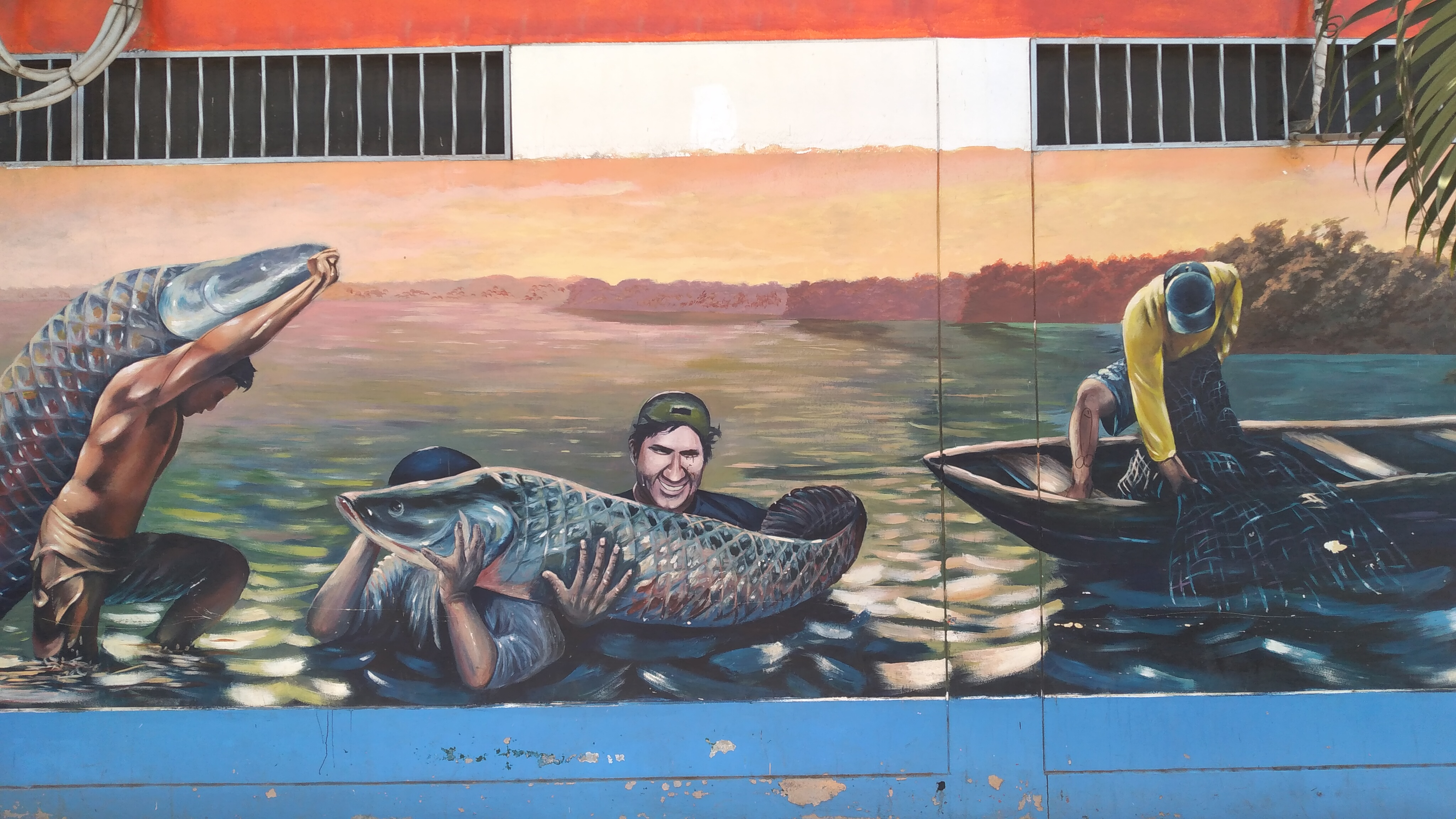
A mural depicting people fishing Arapaima, located in Pucallpa, Peru

Flag of Department of Ucayali, Peru

Seal of Department of Ucayali, Peru
