= Paraheminodus =

Scientific classification
- Kingdom: Animalia
- Phylum: Chordata
- Class: Actinopterygii
- Order: Perciformes
- Family: Triglidae
- Subfamily: Peristediinae
- Genus: Paraheminodus; Kamohara, 1958

Type species
- Satyrichthys laticephalus Kamohara, 1952

Genus of fishes

Paraheminodus is a genus of marine ray-finned fish belonging to the subfamily Peristediinae, the armoured gurnards or armored searobins. These fishes are found in the western Pacific Ocean.

== Taxonomy ==
Paraheminodus was first described as a genus in 1958 by the Japanese ichthyologist Toshiji Kamohara with Satyrichthys laticephalus, which Kamohara had described in 1952, with off Mimase in Kochi Prefecture in Japan as its type locality, designated at its type species, although the genus was described as monospecific. The genus is classified within the family Peristediidae. Within the family Peristediidae there are 2 clades, this genus is in the clade consisting of 5 genera, with the nominate genus Peristedion in the other clade. The name of the genus Paraheminodus means "near Heminodus" from which this genus differs by having well developed barbels on its chin.

== Species ==
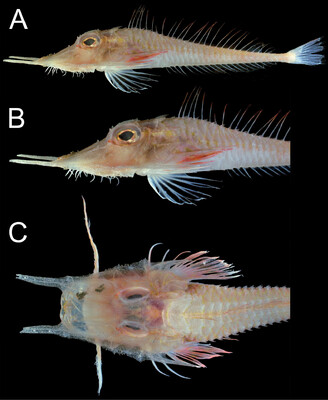
Paraheminodus kamoharai, (A) Lateral view. (B) Close-up image of head in lateral view. (C) Close-up image of head in dorsal view. anterior to left. figure not to scale.

There are currently 4 recognized species in this genus:

- Paraheminodus kamoharai Kawai, Imamura & Nakaya, 2004
- Paraheminodus laticephalus Kamohara, 1952
- Paraheminodus longirostralis Kawai, Nakaya & Séret, 2008
- Paraheminodus murrayi Günther, 1880 (Murray's armoured gurnard)

== Characteristics ==
Paraheminodus armoured gurnards are similar in form to Heminodus and share the band of teeth in the upper jaw with that genus but the barbels on the chin are more developed. Another difference between the two is that in Paraheminodus the rostral process is long and flattened. like a spatula while in Heminodus is short and triangular. The smallest of these fishes is P. kamoharai which has a maximum published standard length of 11.5 cm (4.5 in) while the largest is P. murrayi which has a maximum published standard length of 26.5 cm (10.4 in).

== Distribution and habitat ==
Paraheminodus armoured gurnards are found in the Indo-Pacific, the most widespread species is Murray's armoured gurnard (P. murrayi) which ranges from East Africa to New Caledonia, north to Japan and south to Australia. The other three species are found in the Western Pacific Ocean and are deepwater, demersal fishes.
