= Scalicus investigatoris =

Conservation status
- Least Concern (IUCN 3.1)

Scientific classification
- Kingdom: Animalia
- Phylum: Chordata
- Class: Actinopterygii
- Order: Perciformes
- Family: Triglidae
- Genus: Scalicus
- Species: S. investigatoris

Binomial name
- Scalicus investigatoris (Alcock, 1898)

Synonyms
- Peristethus investigatoris Alcock, 1898; Peristedion investigatoris (Alcock, 1898); Satyrichthys investigatoris (Alcock, 1898)

Species of fish

Scalicus investigatoris is a species of marine ray-finned fish belonging to the family Peristediidae, the armoured gurnards or armored sea robins. This species is found in the Indo-Pacific region. Some authorities regard S, investigatoris as a junior synonyms of S. engyceros.
