= Scalicus hians =

Scientific classification
- Kingdom: Animalia
- Phylum: Chordata
- Class: Actinopterygii
- Order: Perciformes
- Family: Triglidae
- Genus: Scalicus
- Species: S. hians

Binomial name
- Scalicus hians (Gilbert & Cramer, 1897)

Synonyms
- Peristedion hians Gilbert & Cramer, 1897; Satyrichthys hians (Gilbert & Cramer, 1897)

Species of fish

Scalicus hians is a species of marine ray-finned fish belonging to the family Peristediidae, the armoured gurnards or armored sea robins. This species is found in western Pacific Ocean.

== Taxonomy ==
Scalicus hians was first formally described as Peristedion hians in 1897 by the American scientists Charles Henry Gilbert & Frank Cramer with the type locality given as the Hawaiian Islands. Some authorities regard S. amiscus as a junior synonym of S. hians. The specific name hians means "gaping" or "open", it is not clear what this alludes to nor was it explained by Gilbert and Cramer.

== Description ==
Scalicus hians reaches a maximum published total length of 20 cm (7.9 in).

== Distribution and habitat ==
Scalicus hians is found in the western Pacific Ocean off southern Japan, the South China Sea and in the central western Pacific in Hawaii. It is a benthic species of sandy substrates at depths between 275 and 858 m (902 and 2,815 ft)
