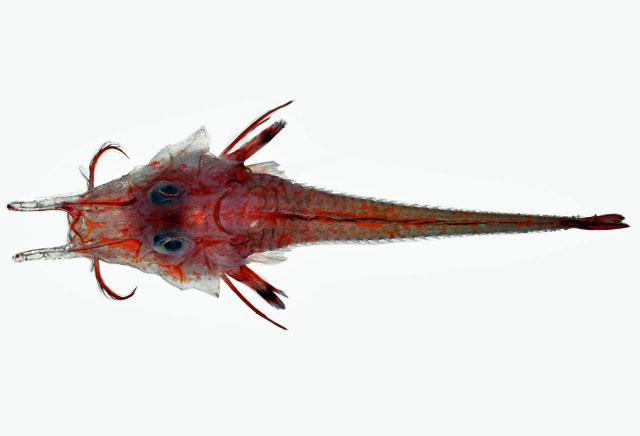
- Top view
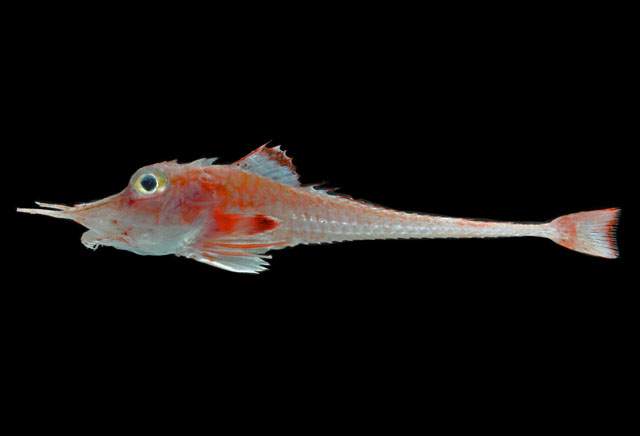
- Side view

Conservation status
- Least Concern (IUCN 3.1)

Scientific classification
- Kingdom: Animalia
- Phylum: Chordata
- Class: Actinopterygii
- Order: Perciformes
- Family: Triglidae
- Genus: Peristedion
- Species: P. greyae

Binomial name
- Peristedion greyae G. C. Miller, 1967
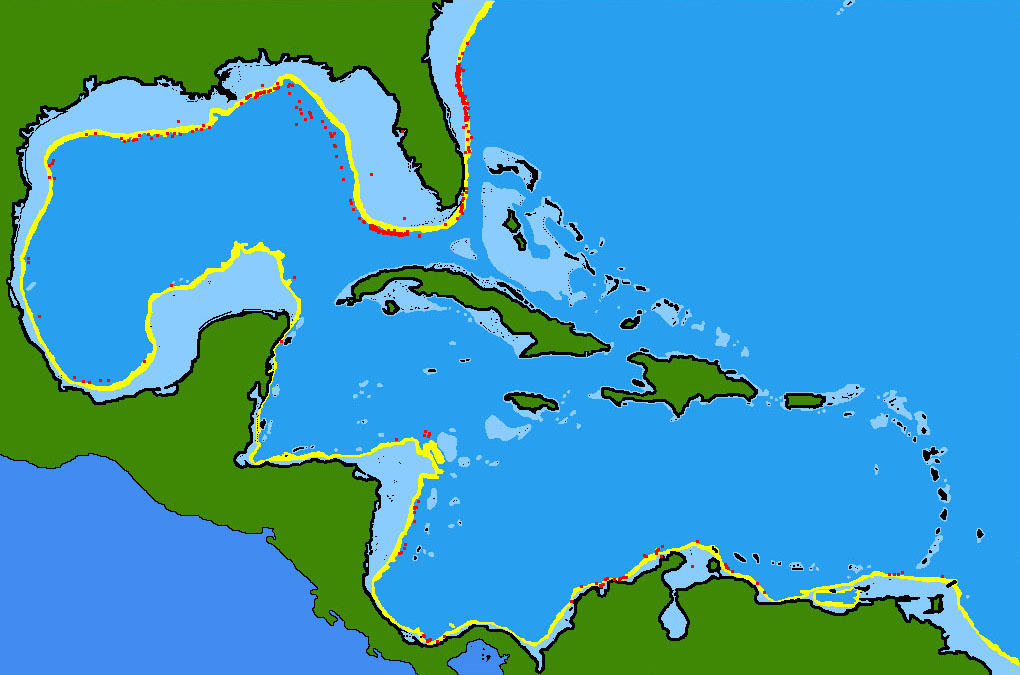

= Peristedion greyae =

Species of fish

Peristedion greyae, the alligator searobin, alligator armored searobin or prickly armoured sea robin, is a species of marine ray-finned fish belonging to the family Peristediidae, the armoured gurnards or armored sea robins. It is found in the western central Atlantic.

== Taxonomy ==
Peristedion greyae was first formally described in 1967 by the American ichthyologist George C. Miller with its type locality given as the western Atlantic Ocean, off the southeastern United States at 29°40'N, 80°11'W at a depth of 165 m (541 ft). The specific name honors Marion Griswold Grey and ichthyologist at the Field Museum of Natural History, recognising her study on bathypelagic and benthic fishes.

== Description ==
Peristedion greyae has a head and body which is flattened dorsoventrally with the body being armored with 4 longitudinal rows of bony spiny scutes, with the rearmost running along the center of the top of back have 2 spines. The head is moderately wide with a moderately long snout. The head has a serrated and ridged bont edge with a clear concave part at the preoperculum and this ends in a flat triangle. There is no spine at the nostril and there is a large spine at the base of scutes on the snout. The slightly divergent plates on the rostrum are relatively long and slender. There are 2 or 3 serrated ridges which do not join each other on the lower jaw and there are barbels on the mouth the longest is on the lower lip. There are separate spiny and soft dorsal fins0 the first having 8 spines with between 18 and 20 soft rays in the second and in the anal fin. The pectoral fin has between 11 and 13 rays within its membrane plus 2 free rays, the top free ray reaches past the origin of the anal fin. The pelvic fins are widely separated and are located below the bases of the pectoral fins, these have a single spine and 5 soft rays. The color of the head and body is pink; the fins have dark green margins while the pectoral fins have with numerous dark red to blackish bars edged with white. The maximum published total length of 23.9 cm (9.4 in) and a maximum published weight of 68.4 g (2.41 oz).

== Distribution and habitat ==
Peristidion greyae is found in the western Atlantic Ocean where it occurs from Virginia south through the Gulf of Mexico and Caribbean Sea to Turiaçu in northeastern Brazil. It is found at depths between 179 and 914 m (587 and 2,999 ft). It is found on sand and mud substrates on the continental shelf. It can be found in a variety of habitats such as deep-sea hydrocarbon seeps and coral reefs in deep waters.

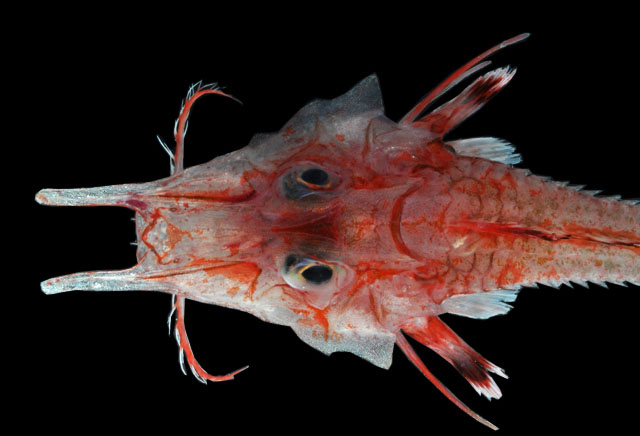
Head, top view

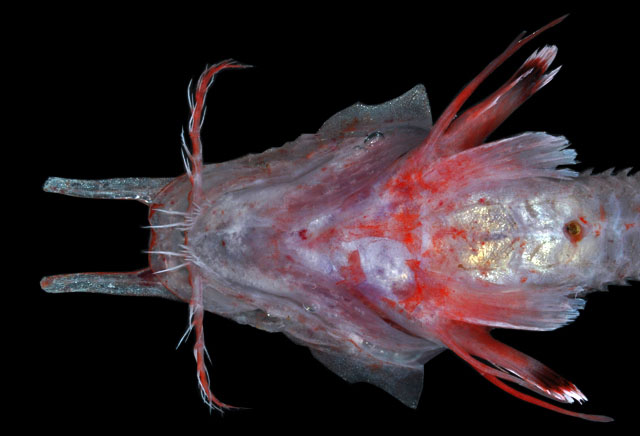
Head, bottom view
