= Spotted gurnard =

Scientific classification
- Kingdom: Animalia
- Phylum: Chordata
- Class: Actinopterygii
- Order: Perciformes
- Family: Triglidae
- Genus: Pterygotrigla
- Subgenus: Pterygotrigla
- Species: P. picta

Binomial name
- Pterygotrigla picta (Günther, 1880)

Synonyms
- Trigla picta Günther, 1880; Chelidonichthys pictus (Günther, 1880); Trigla guttata R.A. Philippi, 1896

Species of fish

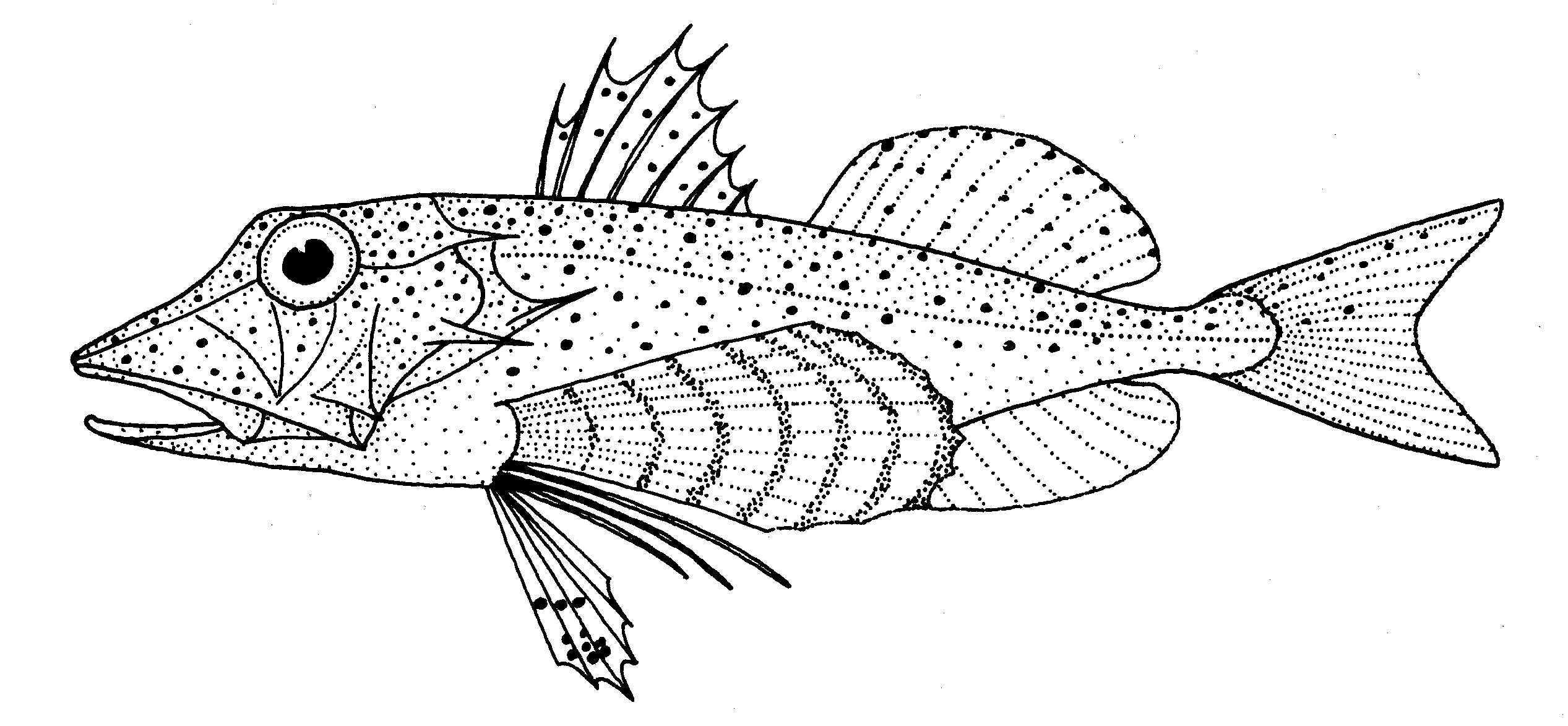
Illustration of a spotted gurnard

The spotted gurnard (Pterygotrigla picta) is a species of ray-finned fish belonging to the family Triglidae, the gurnards and sea robins. This fish is found in the eastern Pacific Ocean. Its length is up to 35 cm.

== Taxonomy ==
The spotted gurnard was first formally described as Trigla picta in 1880 by the German-born British ichthyologist Albert Günther from a holotype collected by the survey ship HMS Challenger off the Juan Fernández Islands of Chile. The species is placed in the subgenus Pterygotrigla. The specific name picta means "painted", Günther did not explain his choice of this name but it is thought that it was the wide, round blotches on the body and fins, except for the abdomen which he described as "drops".

== Description ==
The spotted gurnard is largely coloured red with obvious black spotting on the body and fins, other than the abdomen. They have a maximum published total length of 38 cm (15 in).

== Distribution and habitat ==
The spotted gurnard is found in the southeastern Pacific, although there has been some confusion between this species and the painted latchet (Pterygotrigla andertoni), which is called "spotted gurnard" in New Zealand. This species has been recorded near the Juan Fernandez Islands, the Desventuradas Islands and the neighbouring guyots of Sala y Gomez and Nazca Ridges, they have also been reported from Easter Island and west to the Norfolk Ridge, New Caledonia and other seamounts and undersea ridges. This is a bathydemersal species found at depths of 160 to 500 m (520 to 1,640 ft) on the continental shelf and continental slope.
