= Scalicus paucibarbatus =

Scientific classification
- Kingdom: Animalia
- Phylum: Chordata
- Class: Actinopterygii
- Order: Perciformes
- Family: Triglidae
- Genus: Scalicus
- Species: S. paucibarbatus

Binomial name
- Scalicus paucibarbatus Kawai, 2019

Species of fish

Scalicus paucibarbatus s a species of marine ray-finned fish belonging to the family Peristediidae, the armoured gurnards or armored sea robins. This species is found in Indian Ocean and western Pacific Ocean.
