= Scalicus orientalis =

Scientific classification
- Kingdom: Animalia
- Phylum: Chordata
- Class: Actinopterygii
- Order: Perciformes
- Family: Triglidae
- Genus: Scalicus
- Species: S. orientalis

Binomial name
- Scalicus orientalis (Fowler, 1938)

Synonyms
- Nemaperistedion orientale Fowler, 1938; Peristedion orientale (Fowler, 1938); Satyrichthys orientale (Fowler, 1938); Peristedion fowleri de Beaufort, 1962; Satyrichthys fowleri (de Beaufort, 1962)

Species of fish

Scalicus orientalis is a species of marine ray-finned fish belonging to the family Peristediidae, the armoured gurnards or armored sea robins. This species is found in Indian Ocean and western Pacific Ocean.

== Taxonomy ==
Scalicus orientalis was first formally desceribed as Nemaperistedion orientale in 1938 by the American zoologist Henry Weed Fowler with its type locality give as off Makian Island, between Gillolo and Makian Islands in Indonesia. The specific name orientalis means "eastern".

== Description ==
Scalicus orientalis is pale pinkish-brown in colour becoming paler on the lower body with a scattering of variably sized but small brown spots on the head and body. The front portion of the first dorsal fin is blackish, as are the two large filamentous barbels on the lower jaw, and the long, triangular rostral projections. This species has a maximum standard length of 15.4 cm (6.1 in).

== Distribution and habitat ==
Scalicus orientalis is found in theIndo-Pacific from Réunion and the Arabian Sea east to New Caledonia, north to Japan and south to northern Australia. In Australia it is found from the southwest of the Scott and Seringapatam Reefs and from Innisfall to Coolangatta in Queensland. This is a bathydemersal, benthic species found at depths between 357 and 497 m (1,171 and 1,631 ft) on the continental slope.
