= Scalicus serrulatus =

Scientific classification
- Kingdom: Animalia
- Phylum: Chordata
- Class: Actinopterygii
- Order: Perciformes
- Family: Triglidae
- Genus: Scalicus
- Species: S. serrulatus

Binomial name
- Scalicus serrulatus (Alcock, 1898)

Synonyms
- Peristethus serrulatum Alcock, 1898; Satyrichthys serrulatus (Alcock, 1898)

Species of fish

Scalicus serrulatus is a species of marine ray-finned fish belonging to the family Peristediidae, the armoured gurnards or armored sea robins. It is found in the Indo-West Pacific where it has been recorded from the Saya de Malha Bank, Andaman Sea, Indonesia, Kyushu-Palau Ridge, Japan and Emperor Seamount Chain, Taiwan Taitung County nearby deep sea.
