= Scalicus gilberti =

Scientific classification
- Kingdom: Animalia
- Phylum: Chordata
- Class: Actinopterygii
- Order: Perciformes
- Family: Triglidae
- Genus: Scalicus
- Species: S. gilberti

Binomial name
- Scalicus gilberti (Jordan, 1921)

Species of fish

Scalicus gilberti is a species of marine ray-finned fish belonging to the family Peristediidae, the armoured gurnards or armored sea robins. This species is found in western central Pacific Ocean in Hawaii. Some authorities regard this taxon as a junior synonym of S. engyceros.
