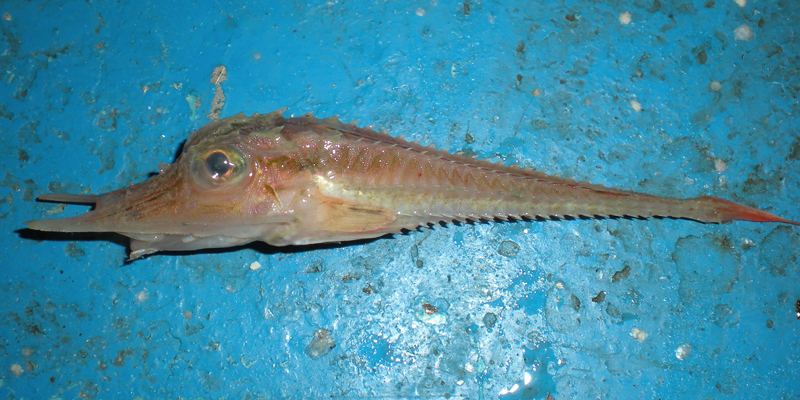

Conservation status
- Least Concern (IUCN 3.1)

Scientific classification
- Kingdom: Animalia
- Phylum: Chordata
- Class: Actinopterygii
- Division: Teleostei
- Order: Perciformes
- Family: Triglidae
- Genus: Peristedion
- Species: P. cataphractum

Binomial name
- Peristedion cataphractum (Linnaeus, 1758)

Synonyms
- Trigla cataphracta Linnaeus, 1758; Peristedion malarmat Lacépède, 1801; Peristedion chabrontera Lacepède, 1801; Octonus olosteon Rafinesque, 1810; Peristedion macronema Cadenat, 1951

= Peristedion cataphractum =

Species of marine ray-finned fish

Peristedion cataphractum, the African armoured gurnard, the mailed gurnard or armed gurnard, is a species of marine ray-finned fish belonging to the family Peristediidae, the armoured gurnards or armored sea robins. It is found in the eastern Atlantic Ocean and the Mediterranean Sea.

== Taxonomy ==
Peristedion cataphractum was first formally described as Trigla cataphracta in 1758 by Carl Linnaeus in the 10th edition of his Systema Naturae with its type locality given as the Mediterranean Sea of southern France. In 1801 the French naturalist Bernard Germain de Lacépède described a new species and genus when he described Peristedion marmalat, from the Mediterranean Sea and the Moluccas. In 1826 Jean Baptiste Bory de Saint-Vincent designated P. marmalat as the type species of the genus. P. marmalat is now treated as a junior synonym of Linnaeus's Trigla cataphracta. The specific name cataphractum means "armoured", an allusion to the bony plates forming a cuirass on this fish's body.

== Description ==
Peristedion cataphractum has a large, bony head which has numerous spines and ridges and a wide snout with two short and wide, or long and thin, rostral extensions projecting from the suborbital or preorbital bones. The mouth is inferior and there are barbels on the lower jaw and the chin with two of these being long and branched. There are no teeth in the jaws or on the roof of the mouth and there is no tongue. The first and second dorsal fins are set closely together, the first has 7 or 8 spines while the second contains 18 or 19 soft rays, The anal fin has between 27 and 30 rays and the pectoral fins have the 2 lowermost rays separated from the others. The body is elongated and has an octagonal section. The body is armoured with 4 rows of spiny, bony plates, called scutes, on each side with each row having between 17 and 21 scutes. The overall colour is dark pink or red, paler on the lower body. The maximum published total length for this species is 40 cm (16 in) although 18 cm (7.1 in) is more typical.

== Distribution and habitat ==
Peristedion cataphractum is found in the eastern Atlantic from the British Isles, although it is rare north of the Bay of Biscay, south to Angola and throughout the Mediterranean Sea. It has a depth range of 50 to 848 m (164 to 2,782 ft), the deepest records coming from the Ionian Sea. It is a demersal fish found on muddy or rock bottoms on the continental shelf.

== Biology ==
Peristedion cataphractum uses its rostrum to dig in the mud, as it searches for prey. It may stand or walk on the substrate using its two free pectoral rays for locomotion. Following a pelagic larval phase the juveniles settle in coastal waters before migrating to deeper water as adults. These fish are gregerious. They feed on small benthic invertebrates, mostly gastropods and other molluscs, also crustaceans.

== Fisheries ==
Peristedion cataphractum is a bycatch of semi industrial and artisanal fisheries with bottom trawl nets in the Mediterranean, here it is usually discarded. Despite this the species is regularly recorded in Spanish fish markets, as well as those of the Tyrrhenian Sea and Sicily where it may be sold fresh or chilled. It tends not to be used in Africa and although it is locally abundant in Morocco it is not eaten there.
