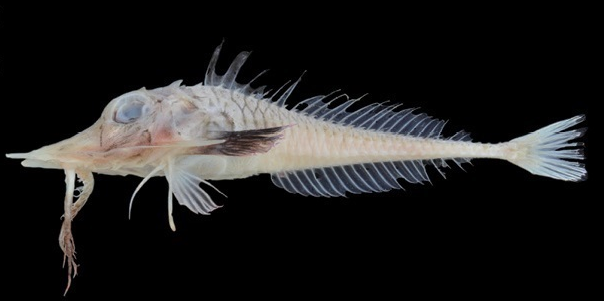

Scientific classification
- Kingdom: Animalia
- Phylum: Chordata
- Class: Actinopterygii
- Order: Perciformes
- Family: Triglidae
- Genus: Scalicus
- Species: S. amiscus

Binomial name
- Scalicus amiscus (D.S. Jordan & Starks, 1904)

Synonyms
- Peristedion amiscus D.S. Jordan & Starks, 1904; Satyrichthys amiscus (D.S. Jordan & Starks, 1904)

= Scalicus amiscus =

Species of fish

Scalicus amiscus is a species of marine ray-finned fish belonging to the family Peristediidae, the armoured gurnards or armored sea robins. This species is found in northwestern Pacific Ocean.

== Taxonomy ==
Scalicus amiscus was first formally described as Peristedion amiscus in 1904 by the American ichthyologists David Starr Jordan and Edwin Chapin Starks with the type locality given as off Manazuru Point, Sagami Bay in the Ashigarashimo District in Kanagawa Prefecture in Japan. Some authorities regard this taxon as a junior synonym of S. hians.

== Description ==
Scalicus amiscus reaches a maximum published total length of 28 cm (11 in).

== Distribution ==
Scalicus amiscus is found in the northwestern Pacific Ocean off Japan and in the East China Sea.
