= Scalicus quadratorostratus =

Scientific classification
- Kingdom: Animalia
- Phylum: Chordata
- Class: Actinopterygii
- Order: Perciformes
- Family: Triglidae
- Genus: Scalicus
- Species: S. quadratorostratus

Binomial name
- Scalicus quadratorostratus (Fourmanoir & Rivaton, 1979)

Synonyms
- Peristedion quadratorostratus Fourmanoir & Rivaton, 1979; Satyrichthys quadratorostratus (Fourmanoir & Rivaton, 1979)

Species of fish

Scalicus quadratorostratus s a species of marine ray-finned fish belonging to the family Peristediidae, the armoured gurnards or armored sea robins. It is found in the Indo-West Pacific where it has been recorded from Madagascar, New Caledonia, Taiwan and Japan.
