= Latchet =

Latchet means the following:

- Pterygotrigla polyommata, a sea robin, a fish species in the genus Pterygotrigla
- a thong, cord or strap fastening the sandal on the foot
- Latchet bows are small lever action crossbows with the cocking lever built into the top of the stock and a top mounted trigger. Originally used circa 16th century in England.
