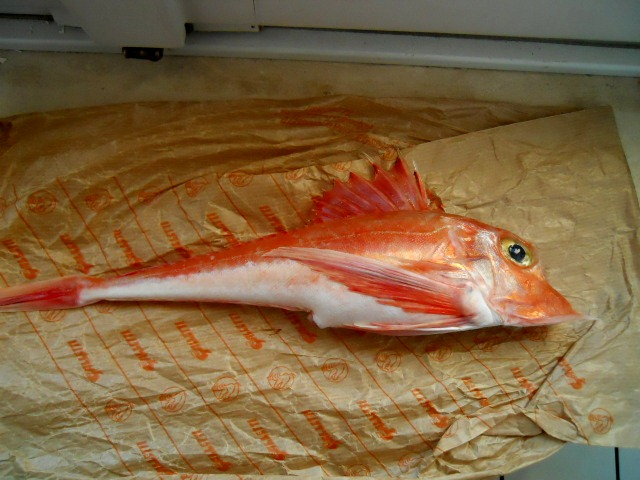
- Piper gurnard (Trigla lyra)

Scientific classification
- Kingdom: Animalia
- Phylum: Chordata
- Class: Actinopterygii
- Order: Perciformes
- Family: Triglidae
- Subfamily: Triglinae; Rafinesque

Genera
- see text

= Triglinae =

Subfamily of fishes

Triglinae is a subfamily of demersal, marine ray-finned fishes, part of the family Triglidae, the gurnards and searobins. These gurnards are found in all the tropical and temperate oceans of the world except for the Western Atlantic Ocean.

== Taxonomy ==
Triglinae was named in 1815 by the French polymath Constantine Samuel Rafinesque and is one of 3 subfamilies in the family Triglidae, part of the suborder Platycephaloidei within the order Scorpaeniformes. This subfamily is regarded as most derived of the 3 subfamilies in Triglidae, with Prionotinae being the basal and Pterygotriglinae being less derived than Triglinae.

=== Etymology ===
Triglinae, like the family name, is based on that of Linnaeus's genus Trigla, the name of which is a classical name for the red mullet (Mullus barbatus), Artedi thought the red mullet and the gurnards were the same as fishes from both taxa are known to create sounds taken out of the water as well as being red in colour. Linnaeus realised they were different and classified Trigla as a gurnard, in contradiction of the ancient usage. Their common name, gurnard, was given to them because when caught, they make a croaking noise similar to a frog, which has given them the onomatopoeic name gurnard.

=== Genera ===
The following four genera are classified within the subfamily Triglinae.

- Chelidonichthys Kaup, 1873
- Eutrigla Fraser-Brunner, 1938
- Lepidotrigla Günther, 1860
- Trigla Linnaeus, 1758

== Characteristics ==
Triglinae gurnards have all the tips of the lower pterygiophores widened and exposed at the bases of both the first and second dorsal fins, There is no basihyal and the lateral line forks into two on the caudal fin. They have a vertebral count of between 29 and 35. The largest species is the tub gurnard (Chelidonichthys lucerna) which has a maximum published total length of 75.1 cm (29.6 in) while the smallest is the spotwing gurnard (Lepidotrigla spiloptera) which has a maximum published total length of 10 cm (3.9 in).

== Distribution ==
Triglinae gurnards are widely distributed in the temperate and tropical seas around the world, although they are absent from the Western Atlantic Ocean.
