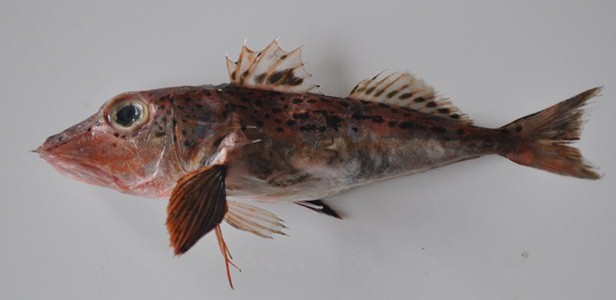

Conservation status
- Least Concern (IUCN 3.1)

Scientific classification
- Kingdom: Animalia
- Phylum: Chordata
- Class: Actinopterygii
- Order: Perciformes
- Family: Triglidae
- Genus: Pterygotrigla
- Subgenus: Otohime
- Species: P. hemisticta

Binomial name
- Pterygotrigla hemisticta (Temminck & Schlegel, 1843)

Synonyms
- Trigla hemisticta Temminck & Schlegel, 1843; Otohime hemisticta (Temminck & Schlegel, 1843); Prionotus alepis Alcock, 1889

= Blackspotted gurnard =

Species of fish

The blackspotted gurnard (Pterygotrigla hemisticta), also known as the half-spotted gurnard, is a species of marine ray-finned fish belonging to the family Triglidae, the gurnards and sea robins. It is found in the Indo-Pacific region.

== Taxonomy ==
The blackspotted gurnard was first formally described in 1843 as Trigla hemisticta by Coenraad Jacob Temminck and Hermann Schlegel with the type locality given as Nagasaki in Japan. In 1907 David Starr Jordan and Edwin Chapin Starks proposed the monotypic genus Otohime for Trigla hemisticta and this is currently treated as a subgenus of the genus Pterygotrigla with the blackspotted gurnard as its type species. The specific name means "half spotted" and is assumed to refer to the spotted upper body and dorsal fin.

== Description ==
The blackspotted gurnard has an elongated body. The head has no scales but is covered with spines and ridges. There are spines at the tip of the snout. There is a large, robust spine on the operculum. The terminal mouth has villiform teeth on the jaws, premaxillae, dentaries and the head of the vomer. The cycloid scales are tint but the nape has no scales. The scales on the lateral line are crenulated. The first dorsal fin has 9 or 10 bony plates, created by flattened pterygiophores, along its base. This fin has 7 spines while the second dorsal fin has 11 soft rays, as does the anal fin. The pectoral fins have 15 rays with the inner 3 separated from the main part of the fin. The pectoral fin has a black patch and crossed by an oblique line of white spots. The main colour is red with obvious black spotting and large black spot on the spiny dorsal fin. This species attains a maximum total length of 30 cm (12 in).

== Distribution and habitat ==
The blackspotted gurnard is found in the Indian and Western Pacific Oceans. It ranges from Japan in the north, south through the China Seas to the Philippines and northern Australia.It has also been recorded from Bangladesh, India, Yemen and Oman. The blackspotted gurnard is a demersal fish, typically encountered sitting on the sea bed at depths between 10 and 440 m (33 and 1,444 ft) on the continental shelf and on the continental margin.
