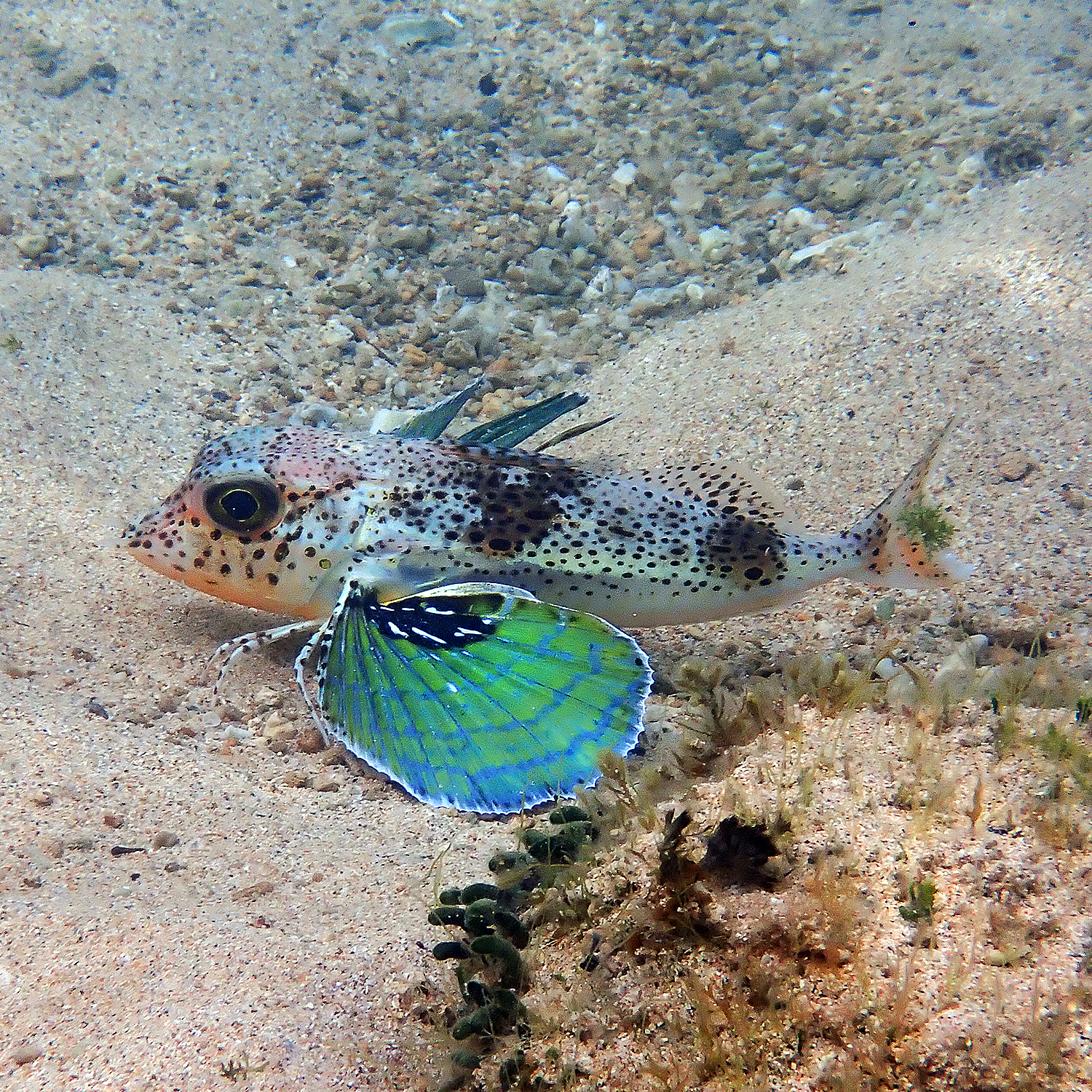
- Painted latchet (P. andertoni)

Scientific classification
- Kingdom: Animalia
- Phylum: Chordata
- Class: Actinopterygii
- Division: Teleostei
- Order: Perciformes
- Family: Triglidae
- Subfamily: Pterygotriglinae
- Genus: Pterygotrigla; Waite, 1899

Type species
- Trigla polyommata J. Richardson, 1839

Synonyms
- Hoplonotus Guichenot, 1867 (pre-occupied); Otohime D. S. Jordan & Starks, 1907; Exolissus D. S. Jordan, 1923; Parapterygotrigla Matsubara, 1937; Dixiphichthys Fowler, 1938; Dixiphistes Fowler, 1938; Uradia Kamohara, 1938

= Pterygotrigla =

Genus of fishes

Pterygotrigla is a genus of genus of marine ray-finned fishes belonging to the family Triglidae, the gurnards and sea robins, one of two genera belonging to the subfamily Pterygotriglinae. These gurnards are found in the Indian and Pacific oceans.

== Taxonomy ==
Pterygotrigla was originally described as the genus Hoplonotus by the French zoologist Alphonse Guichenot but this name was invalid as it was preoccupied by Hoplonotus Schmidt 1846, a coleopteran taxon. In 1899 the Australian ichthyologist Edgar Ravenswood Waite put forward the new name Pterygotrigla to replace Guichenot's name. The type species of the genus is Trigla polyommata which was described in 1839 by John Richardson with its type locality given as Port Arthur, Tasmania. This genus, along with the monotypic Bovitrigla, makes up the subfamily Pterygotriglinae within the family Triglidae. The genus name, Pterygotrigla, is a compound of pterygion, a diminutive of pteryx, which means "fin", thought to be a reference to pectoral fins of the type species P. polyommata and their resemblance to wings, and Trigla the type genus of the Triglidae which was also the original genus of P. polyommata when it was described by Richardson in 1839. The common name used for most of the species classified within this genus is gurnard which derives from the croaking sound they create when caught.

== Subgenera and species ==
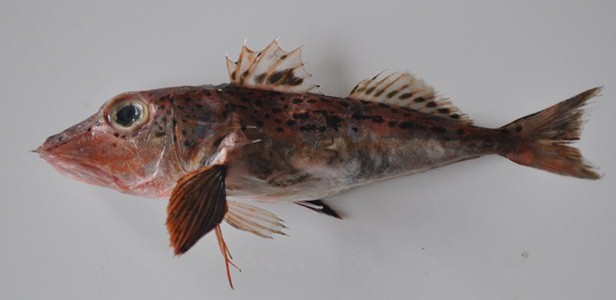
Blackspotted gurnard (P. hemisticta)

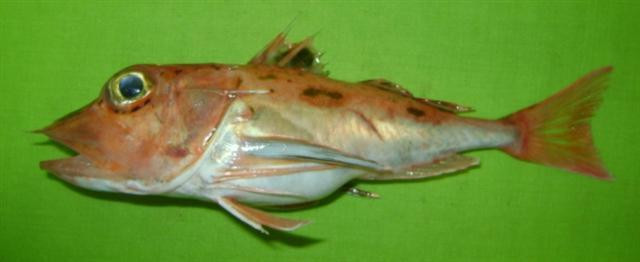
Pterygotrigla arabica

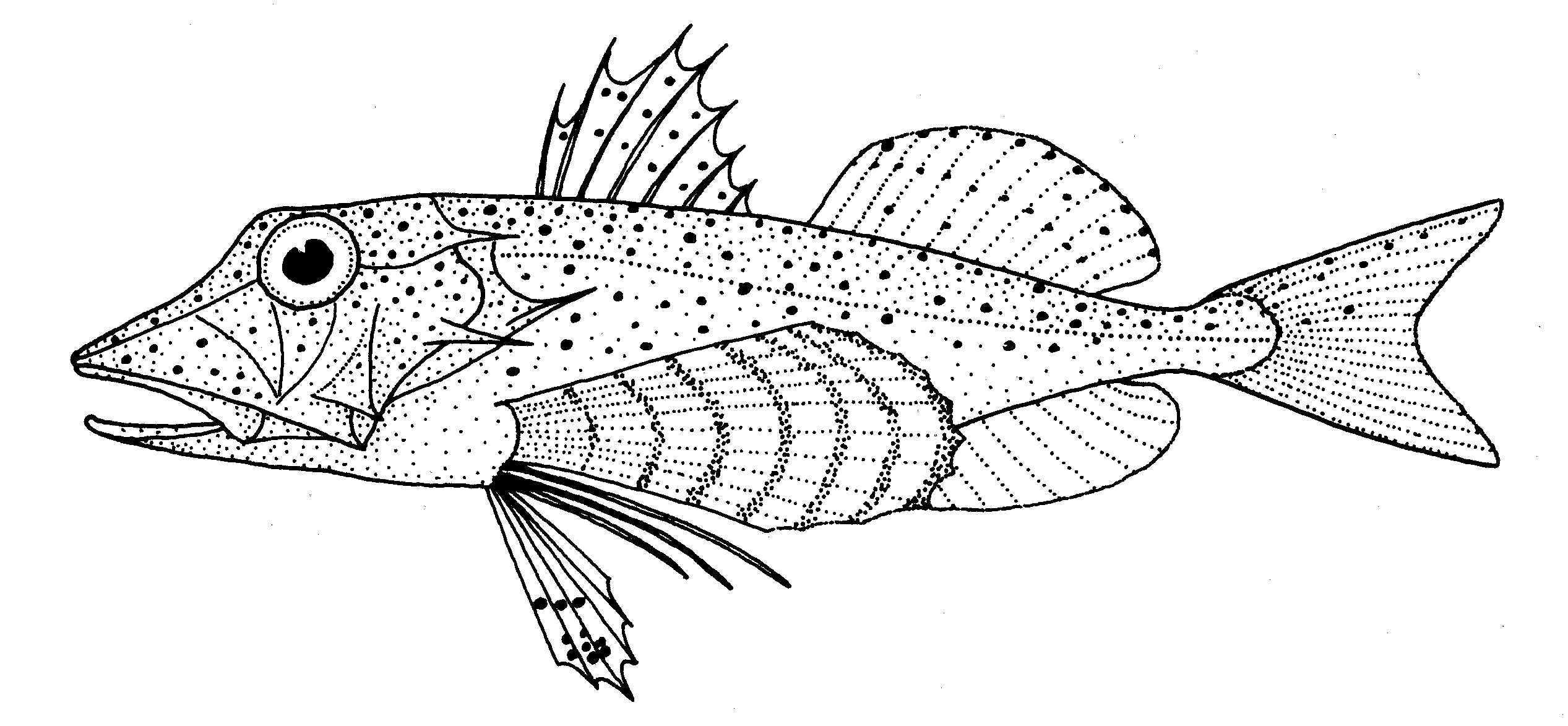
Spotted gurnard (P. picta)

There are currently 31 recognized species in this genus: and these are classified into subgenera as follows:

- Subgenus Pterygotrigla Waite, 1899
  - Pterygotrigla andertoni Waite, 1910 (Painted latchet)
  - Pterygotrigla cajorarori Richards & Yato, 2012 (Hyperostotic gurnard)
  - Pterygotrigla gomoni Last & Richards, 2012 (Gomon's Gurnard)
  - Pterygotrigla guezei Fourmanoir, 1963 (Mauritius gurnard)
  - Pterygotrigla leptacanthus Günther, 1880 (Black-finned gurnard)
  - Pterygotrigla macrolepidota Kamohara, 1938
  - Pterygotrigla madagascarensis Yato & Heemstra, 2019
  - Pterygotrigla pauli Hardy, 1982 (Yellow spotted gurnard)
  - Pterygotrigla picta Günther, 1880 (Spotted gurnard)
  - Pterygotrigla polyommata J. Richardson, 1839 (Latchet)
  - Pterygotrigla ryukyuensis Matsubara & Hiyama, 1932 (Ryukyu gurnard)
  - Pterygotrigla saumarez Last & Richards, 2012 (Saumarez gurnard)
- Subgenus Otohime Jordan & Starks 1907
  - Pterygotrigla amaokai Richards, Yato & Last, 2003
  - Pterygotrigla arabica Boulenger, 1888
  - Pterygotrigla draiggoch Richards, Yato & Last, 2003 (Dragon gurnard)
  - Pterygotrigla elicryste Richards, Yato & Last, 2003 (Dwarf gurnard)
  - Pterygotrigla hafizi Richards, Yato & Last, 2003
  - Pterygotrigla hemisticta Temminck & Schlegel, 1843 (Blackspotted gurnard)
  - Pterygotrigla multipunctata Yato & Yamakawa, 1983
  - Pterygotrigla soela Richards, Yato & Last, 2003 (Soela gurnard)
  - Pterygotrigla spirai Golani & Baranes, 1997
  - Pterygotrigla tagala Herre & Kauffman, 1952
  - Pterygotrigla urashimai Richards, Yato & Last, 2003
- Subgenus Parapterygotrigla Matsubara, 1937
  - Pterygotrigla brandesii (Bleeker, 1850)
  - Pterygotrigla ferculum (Whitley, 1952)
  - Pterygotrigla hoplites Fowler, 1938 (Swordspine gurnard)
  - Pterygotrigla jacad Richards & Yato, 2014
  - Pterygotrigla macrorhynchus Kamohara, 1936 (Longnose gurnard)
  - Pterygotrigla megalops Fowler, 1938
  - Pterygotrigla multiocellata Matsubara, 1937 (Antrorse spined gurnard)
  - Pterygotrigla robertsi del Cerro & Lloris, 1997

== Characteristics ==
Pterygotrigla gurnards are characterised by having the pterygiophores of the spiny dorsal fin flattened into plate-like structures, there are less than 65 scales along the lateral line and they have 26-28 vertebrae in their spine.

== Distribution ==
Pterygotrigla gurnards are found in the Indo-Pacific from the eastern coast of Africa, including the Red Sea, east into the western central Pacific Ocean. They occur as far north as Japan and south to New Zealand.
