= Scalicus engyceros =

Scientific classification
- Kingdom: Animalia
- Phylum: Chordata
- Class: Actinopterygii
- Order: Perciformes
- Family: Triglidae
- Genus: Scalicus
- Species: S. engyceros

Binomial name
- Scalicus engyceros (Günther, 1872)

Synonyms
- Peristethus engyceros Günther, 1872; Satyrichthys engyceros (Günther, 1872)

Species of fish

Scalicus engyceros is a species of marine ray-finned fish belonging to the family Peristediidae, the armoured gurnards or armored sea robins. This species is found in northwestern Pacific Ocean.

== Taxonomy ==
Scalicus engyceros was first formally described as Peristethus engyceros in 1872 by the German-born British herpetologist and ichthyologist Albert Günther with the type locality given as the Hawaiian Islands. Some authorities regard S. gilberti and S, investigatoris as a junior synonyms of S. engyceros. The specific name engyceros combines engys, meaning "near", with ceros, which means "horn", an allusion Günther did not explain but may refer to the horn like projections on the rostrum.

== Distribution and habitat ==
Scalicus engyceros is found in the western Pacific Ocean off southern Japan, the South China Sea and in the central western Pacific in Hawaii. It is a benthic species of rocky and sandy substrates at depths between 200 and 662 m (656 and 2,172 ft) Other members of the family Peristediidae are often found in the Indo-West Pacific, specifically central and western Pacific on the Emperor Seamount Chain. They prefer tropical to warm, temperate seas and can often be found in marine waters on the lower continental shelf and upper continental slope at depths of depths of 230m-545m. Members of the Scalicus genus are bottom feeders and can be found on the sea floor. They prefer slopes with soft bottoms, specifically sandy or muddy substrates but can also be found in rubble or reef -type bottoms.

== Physical description ==
Scalicus engyceros have filamentous barbels with 13-18 branches at the base. They are known for their narrow preorbital processes. The projections are rigid and parallel whilst also being quite short. The crown of the head has small spines on each side of it. The pelvic fin is short and does not reach the anus. Scalicus engyceros reaches a maximum published total length of 32 cm (13 in). Scalicus engyceros come in many different colors. Many come brightly colored such as in yellow, orange, red, or white. There is intraspecific color variation depending on location with some specimen from Hawaii having dusky spots, whereas specimens in the Emperor Seamount Chain and Africa are missing spots. The family Perstiediidae is unique in that their body is encased in heavily armored plates, detached pectoral fin rays, rostral projections, and barbels on the lower jaw.

== Development ==
Other members of the family Peristediidae are known as egg bearers. The eggs are small, embryonic for 2–3 days, and stay in the larval period for a few months. Recruitment season is a few months in which they progressively grow between summer and winter.

== Reproduction ==
Other members of the family Peristediidae have been known to start spawning between summer and autumn months. Once they reach lengths between 150mm and 220 mm they have reached sexual maturity and can begin spawning. They have been known to spawn based on the necessity to match spawning and recruitment phases with preferred season of food availability.

== Life span ==
Other members of the family Peristediidae have been known to live roughly 2–3 years. The growth rate is roughly 1.5 to 2 years until sexual maturity, and then growth stabilizes after that ending around 2–3 years.

== Behavior ==
Members of Peristediidae use their sensory projections to hunt for food considering the weak light at the depth in which they reside. They are solitary and typically associate with other members once peak breeding season has occurred.

== Food habits ==
Family Peristediidae are known predators. They use detached pectoral-fins and rostral projections to hunt for benthic fish and crustaceans that live within the sand. The projections have sensory pores that detect the submerged prey. Other members of Peristediidae have been known to have common organisms in their diet such as crustaceans and mollusks.

== Predation ==
There are no specific predators of armored sea robins, however Scalicus engyceros use heavily armored scales help to protect them from potential predators.

== Ecosystem roles ==
Because members of Peristediidae are known predators, they help to control the population of sub-benthic species. The genus Scalicus also fills an ecological niche that not many others can fit by living near seamounts, which are not extremely populated due to their depth and environment.

== Economic importance ==
Many bottom dwelling fish are known to be caught in bottom trawling fisheries. Members of Peristediidae specifically have been caught by scientists purely from by-catch of bottom trawling. The nets have been known to destroy egg and larval stages of many fish species that live in these areas. Much by catch is often tossed back to sea which can cause pollution from decay.

== Conservation ==
Members of Scalicus engyceros are used to advocate for conservation of sea mounts. Because Scalicus engyceros and many other deep sea dwelling fish reside on around these areas, seamount advocation for management and conservation are becoming more pronounced.
