= Marion Griswold Grey =

American ichthyologist

Marion Griswold Grey (1911–1964) was an American ichthyologist.

The daughter of James and Lucy Griswold, she was born Marion Griswold in Los Angeles and moved to Kenosha, Wisconsin with her family when she was nine. She studied zoology at Wellesley College but left after two years of study. In 1933, she married Arthur L. Grey and moved to Chicago; the couple had three children, including linguist Sarah Thomason.

After she brought a pipefish to the Field Museum of Natural History for identification, she was encouraged by Alfred Weed to volunteer at the museum. She gained additional knowledge from informal training while at the museum. From 1943 to 1946, she was put in charge of the Fish Division at the museum on an unpaid basis while curator Loren P. Woods served in the Navy during World War II. She continued to be an associate in the Division of Fishes at the museum until her death in 1964. In 1948, she was a member of the museum's expedition to Bermuda. She learned Russian so that she could read literature on ichthyology in that language, also translating papers for colleagues. In 1953, she presented a paper at the International Congress of Zoology in Copenhagen. Grey published 21 papers, as well as contributing a section on the family Gonostomatidae to Fishes of the Western North Atlantic, published in 1964.

She died following a series of strokes at the age of 52.

Her name appears as author citation for several genera and species of fish. In 1967 George C. Miller posthumously honored her contribution to the knowledge of bathydemersal and benthic fishes in the specific name of the armored sea robin Peristedion greyae.
