= Bovitrigla =

Conservation status
- Data Deficient (IUCN 3.1)

Scientific classification
- Kingdom: Animalia
- Phylum: Chordata
- Class: Actinopterygii
- Order: Perciformes
- Family: Triglidae
- Subfamily: Pterygotriglinae
- Genus: Bovitrigla; Fowler, 1938
- Species: B. acanthomoplate

Binomial name
- Bovitrigla acanthomoplate Fowler, 1938

Synonyms
- Pterygotrigla acanthomoplate (Fowler, 1938)

Genus of fish

Bovitrigla is a monotypic genus of marine ray-finned fishes belonging to the family Triglidae, the gurnards and sea robins, one of two genera belonging to the subfamily Pterygotriglinae. Its only species, Bovitrigla acanthomoplate, is found in the western Pacific Ocean.

== Taxonomy ==
Bovitrigla was first described as a genus in 1938 by the American zoologist Henry Weed Fowler when he described its only species, Bovitrigla acanthomoplate, the holotype of which was collected off Point Tagolo Light, near northern Mindanao in the Philippines at 8°47'N, 123°31'15"E by United States Bureau of Fisheries steamer USFS Albatross II. The genus is classified within the subfamily Pterygotriglinae, alongside the rather more speciose Pterygotrigla. The genus name is a combination of bos, meaning "bull" and Trigla, the type genus of the Triglidae, Fowler did not explain this but it may allude to the bull-like appearance of its sizeable head. The specific name acanthomoplate compounds acanthus, meaning "thorn" or "spine" with omos, which means "shoulder" and plate, "blade", alluding to the "long, slender suprascapular spine, flaring out and back".

== Description ==
Bovitrigla has a pair long spines on the snout and posttemporal bone, as well as spine on the postocular. The first dorsal fin has 8 spines and the second dorsal fin has 11 soft rays while the anal fin has a single spine and 11 soft rays. The soft ray count may be 10 for the second dorsal fin and 11 for the anal fin. The colour of preserved specimens is plain brownish with no black spots. The largest specimen had a total length of 163.8 mm (6.45 in).

== Distribution and habitat ==
Bovitrigla is found in the Western Pacific Ocean and specimens have been collected near the Philippines, in the South China Sea and from southern Japan. It has been recorded from depths of 300 to 500 metres (980 to 1,640 ft).
