= Pterygotrigla multiocellata =

Scientific classification
- Kingdom: Animalia
- Phylum: Chordata
- Class: Actinopterygii
- Order: Perciformes
- Family: Triglidae
- Genus: Pterygotrigla
- Subgenus: Parapterygotrigla
- Species: P. multiocellata

Binomial name
- Pterygotrigla multiocellata (Matsubara, 1937)

Synonyms
- Parapterygotrigla multiocellata Matsubara, 1937

Species of fish

Pterygotrigla multiocellata, the antrorse spined gurnard, is a species of ray-finned fish belonging to the family Triglidae, the gurnards and sea robins. This fish is found in the Indo-Pacific region where it has been recorded from Japan, Saipan, and the eastern and western tropical waters off Australia.

== Taxonomy ==
Pterygotrigla multiocellata was first formally described in 1937 as Parapterygotrigla multiocellata by the Japanese ichthyologist Kiyomatsu Matsubara with the type locality given as the Kumano Sea southeast of the Kii Peninsula in Japan. It is classified within the subgenus Parapterygotrigla of the genus Pterygotrigla and is the type species of that subgenus. The specific name is a compound of multi with ocellata, which means "having eye-like spots", an allusion to the upper half of the body having a scattering of small yellowish dark-brown spots.

== Description ==
Pterygotrigla multiocellata has a large, triangular head with no spines around the eye but with a nasal spine and a short spine on the operculum and a long spine on the nape. The spines on the rostrum are robust but short there is a forward pointing, or antrorse, rostral spine, as well as a long cleithral spine. There are 10 bucklers, bony flat plates, along the base of the first dorsal fin with the first buckler extending to the front of the first spine. The overall colour is red with no black spots. The first dorsal fin has 7 or 8 spines and the second has between 10 and 12 soft rays while the anal fin has 11 to 13 soft rays. This species has attained a maximum published standard length of 24.1 cm (9.5 in).

== Distribution and habitat ==
Pterygotrigla multiocellata is found in the Southeastern Indian Ocean and West Pacific where it occurs in Japan, Saipan and eastern and western tropical Australia. It has also been recorded in Korea. This is a rare species of deep waters at depths between 178 and 379 m (584 and 1,243 ft).
