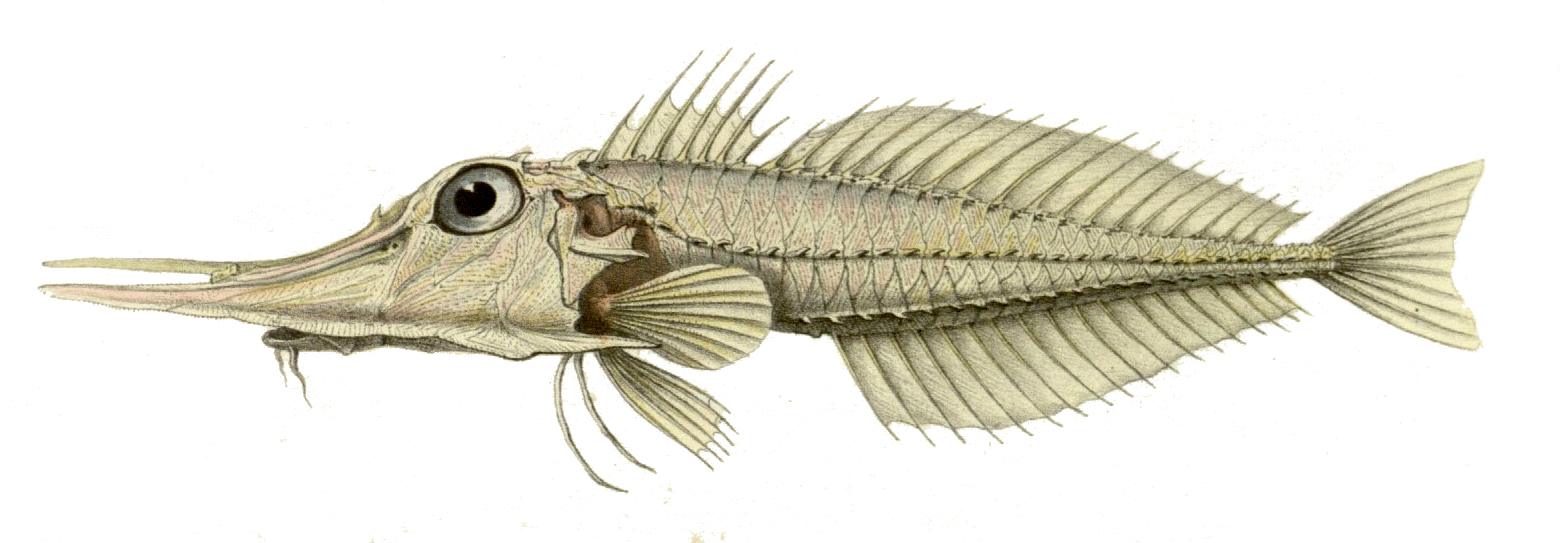
- Satyrichthys rieffeli

Scientific classification
- Kingdom: Animalia
- Phylum: Chordata
- Class: Actinopterygii
- Order: Perciformes
- Family: Triglidae
- Subfamily: Peristediinae
- Genus: Satyrichthys; Kaup, 1873

Type species
- Peristethus rieffeli Kaup, 1859

Synonyms
- Acanthostedion Fowler, 1943

= Satyrichthys =

Genus of fishes

Satyrichthys is a genus of marine ray-finned fish belonging to the subfamily Peristediinae, the armoured gurnards or armored searobins. These fishes are found in the Indo-Pacific region.

== Taxonomy ==
Satyrichthys was first described as a monotypic genus in 1873 by the German zoologist Johann Jakob Kaup with Peristethus rieffeli as its only species. Kaup had described P. reifeli in 1853 with iots type locality given as China. Within the family Peristediidae there are 2 clades, this genus is in the clade consisting of 5 genera, with the nominate genus Peristedion in the other clade. The name of the genus Satyrichtys was not explained by Kaup but it combines satyr, meaning "god" or "demon", with ichthys, meaning "fish", the first part may be an allusion to the two fork-shaped projections at the end of the snout of S. rieffeli, resembling the horns depicted on demons.

== Species ==
Satyrichthys currently contains 7 recognized species:

- Satyrichthys clavilapis Fowler, 1938
- Satyrichthys laticeps Schlegel, 1852
- Satyrichthys longiceps Fowler, 1943
- Satyrichthys milleri Kawai, 2013
- Satyrichthys moluccensis Bleeker, 1850 (Black-finned armoured-gurnard)
- Satyrichthys rieffeli Kaup, 1859 (Spotted armoured-gurnard)
- Satyrichthys welchi Herre, 1925 (Robust armoured-gurnard)

== Characteristics ==
Satyrichthys armoured gurnards have no teeth in their upper jaws, the sides of the head are smooth. The rear scutes in the lower lateral rows are not joined to the ventral midline. They have no branched barbels on the lower jaw apart from the rearmost lip and chin barbels. The second dorsal fin and the anal fin contain less than 20 soft rays. The smallest of these fishes is S. longiceps which has a maximum published standard length of 15.5 cm (6.1 in) while the largest is S. laticeps which has a maximum published standard length of 48.7 cm (19.2 in).

== Distribution ==
Satyrichthys armoured gurnards occur in the Indian Ocean and the Western Pacific Ocean.
