= Heminodus =

Scientific classification
- Kingdom: Animalia
- Phylum: Chordata
- Class: Actinopterygii
- Order: Perciformes
- Family: Triglidae
- Subfamily: Peristediinae
- Genus: Heminodus; H. M. Smith, 1917
- Species: H. philippinus

Binomial name
- Heminodus philippinus H. M. Smith, 1917

Synonyms
- Heminodus japonicus Kamohara, 1952

Species of fish

Heminodus is a genus of marine ray-finned fish belonging to the subfamily Peristediinae, the armoured gurnards or armored sea robins. It is currently considered to be a monotypic genus, its only species being Heminodus philippinus.

== Taxonomy ==
Heminodus was first described as a genus in 1917 by the American ichthyologist Hugh McCormick Smith when he was describing its only species H. phillipinus with its type locality being given as the Mindanao Sea off Tawi-tawi in the Philippines. Specimens collected in the eastern Indian Ocean off Western Australia between 1989 and 1991 were identified as probably belonging to the genus Hemidonus but were not identified to species, so may have been H. phillipinus or a new undescribed species. The genus name was not explained by Smith but means "half knot", may be an allusion to the short and spiny rostral processes as compared to the long and flat processes on the jaggedhead gurnard (Gargariscus prionocephalus). The specific name refers to the type locality.

== Description ==
Heminodus philippinus has a fusiform body armoured with bony plates and a large, flattened head with a broad snout which has a short, triangular rostral projection on either side, almost parallel to each other. The space between the eyes is concave with no clear ridges/ There are spines on the supraocular, parietal, posttemporal, opercular, and preopercular bones in the head. The large mouth is positioned below the snout and there are villiform teeth in the upper jaw and there are no other teeth in the mouth. There are 1 or 2 short barbels on the lip and none on chin. The armoured pates on the body are arranged in 4 rows and each plate has one, rear pointing spine. The head and upper body are pale red with yellowish green spots, the lower body is whitish. The fins are largely whitish with 2 dusky bands on the pectoral fin. There are between 6 and 8 spines in the first dorsal fin and between 18 and 21 soft rays in the second dorsal fin while the anal fin has 18-19 soft rays. This species reaches a maximum published length of 9 cm (3.5 in).

== Distribution and habitat ==
Heminodus philippinus has been sited by Japan, Indonesia, the Philippines, the South China Sea, and the Andaman Coast of India. This is a deep water demersal fish living at depths between 200 and 500 m (660 and 1,640 ft) on the continental shelf and slope.
