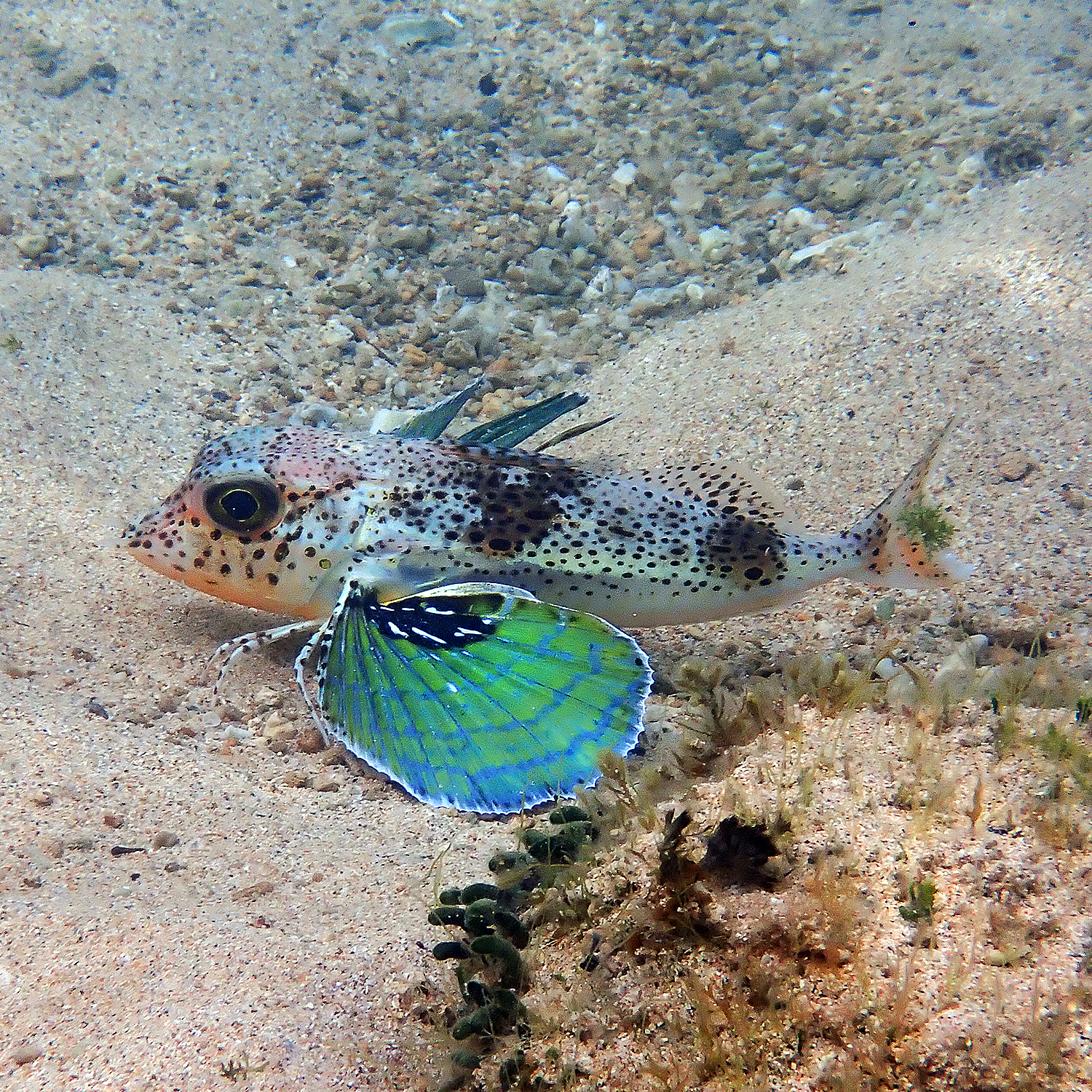
- Painted latchet (Pterygotrigla andertoni)

Scientific classification
- Kingdom: Animalia
- Phylum: Chordata
- Class: Actinopterygii
- Order: Perciformes
- Family: Triglidae
- Subfamily: Pterygotriglinae; Fowler, 1938

Genera
- see text

= Pterygotriglinae =

Subfamily of ray-finned fishes

Pterygotriglinae is a subfamily of demersal, marine ray-finned fishes, part of the family Triglidae, the gurnards and searobins. These gurnards are found in the Indo-Pacific region.

== Taxonomy ==
Pterygotriglinae was first proposed as a taxonomic grouping by the American zoologist Henry Weed Fowler in 1938 in his description of the fishes collected by United States Bureau of Fisheries steamer USFS Albatross II. It is one of three subfamilies within the family Triglidae, part of the suborder Platycephaloidei within the order Scorpaeniformes. This subfamily is regarded as more derived than the Prionotinae but less so than Triglinae.

=== Etymology ===
The name of the subfamily is based on that of its type genus, Pterygotrigla, which is a compound of pterygion, a diminutive of pteryx, which means "fin", thought to be a reference to pectoral fins of the type species P. polyommata and their resemblance to wings, and Trigla the type genus of the Triglidae which was also the original genus of P. polyommata when it was described by Richardson in 1839. The common name used for most of the species classified within this subfamily is gurnard which derives from the croaking sound they create when caught.

=== Genera ===
Pterygotriglinae contains the following 2 genera:

- Bovitrigla Fowler, 1938
- Pterygotrigla Waite, 1899

== Characteristics ==
Pterygotriglinae gurnards are separated from the other Triglid subfamilies by having 27 vertebrae, the lateral line ends at caudal base and does not fork on the caudal fin, there is no basihyal and there is no expansion of upper end of the lower pterygiophores or any broadening of only those adjacent to the spiny dorsal fin. The largest species is the latchet (Pterygotrigla polyommatai) which has a maximum published total length of 62 cm (24 in) and the smallest is the Pterygotrigla hafizi at 8.9 cm (3.5 in) in maximum published total length.

== Distribution ==
Pterygotriglinae gurnards are found in the Indian and Pacific Oceans from the Red Sea and eastern Africa to the Western Central Pacific Ocean.
