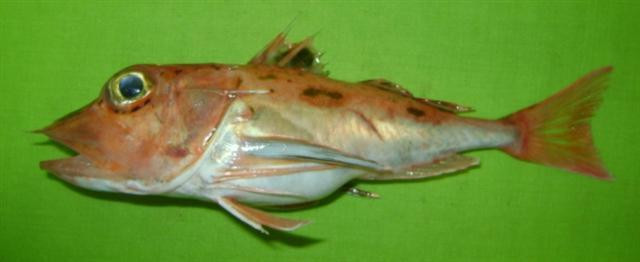

Conservation status
- Least Concern (IUCN 3.1)

Scientific classification
- Kingdom: Animalia
- Phylum: Chordata
- Class: Actinopterygii
- Order: Perciformes
- Family: Triglidae
- Genus: Pterygotrigla
- Subgenus: Otohime
- Species: P. arabica

Binomial name
- Pterygotrigla arabica (Boulenger,1888)

Synonyms
- Trigla arabica Boulenger, 1888

= Pterygotrigla arabica =

Species of fish

Pterygotrigla arabica is a species of ray-finned fish belonging to the family Triglidae, the gurnards and sea robins. This fish is found in the northern Indian Ocean.

== Taxonomy ==
Pterygotrigla arabica was first formally described as Trigla arabica in 1888 by the Belgian-born British ichthyologist George Albert Boulenger with its type locality given as Muscat on the Gulf of Oman. This species is classified as belonging to the subgenus Otohime. The specific name refers to the type locality in the Arabian Sea.

== Description ==
Pterygotrigla arabica has a moderately large head which has no scales and the head has many ridges and spines. There are two spines pointing outwards at the anterior end of the snout and robust triangular spines on the rostrum. There is a long, thin spine on the operculum which extends past the cleithrum, which bears a short spine. The mouth is terminal and has small villiform teeth on the jaws, mandibles, premaxilla and vomer. The scales on the trunk are elongated but scales are absent on the ventral surface except for the belly. There are 7 spines in the first dorsal fin and 12 soft rays in the second dorsal fin while the anal fin has 12 soft rays. The pectoral fin contains 12 rays within its fin membrane and 3 separated rays. The overall colour is red with irregular black spots on the head, upper body and soft rayed dorsal fin. There is a large black spot on the spiny dorsal fin and the inner surface of the pectoral fin is black. The maximum published standard length for this species is 19.8 cm (7.8 in).

== Distribution and habitat ==
Pterygotrigla arabica is found in the northern Indian Ocean. It is found in the Gulf of Aden, the Arabian Sea and the Gulf of Oman and along the Bay of Bengal coast of India as far north as the southern part of West Bengal. The habitat preferences of this species are little known but the gurnards in the genus Pterygotrigla typically live in deep benthic habitats along the edges of the continental shelf and upper continental slope. P. arabica has been recorded from depths between 26 and 210 m (85 and 689 ft).
