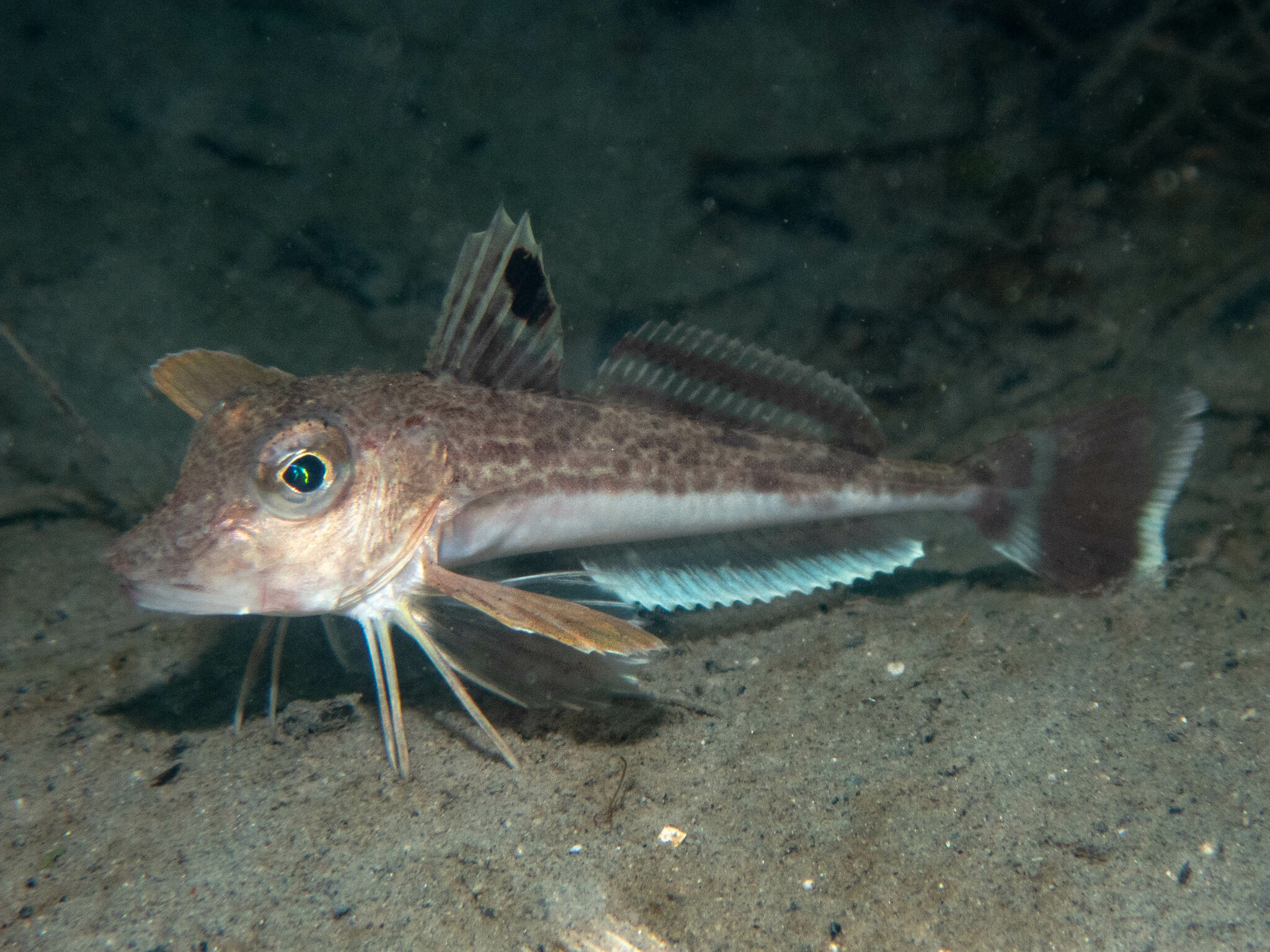
- Grey gurnard, Northern Ireland

Conservation status
- Least Concern (IUCN 3.1)

Scientific classification
- Kingdom: Animalia
- Phylum: Chordata
- Class: Actinopterygii
- Division: Teleostei
- Order: Perciformes
- Family: Triglidae
- Subfamily: Triglinae
- Genus: Eutrigla; Fraser-Brunner, 1938
- Species: E. gurnardus

Binomial name
- Eutrigla gurnardus (Linnaeus, 1758)

Synonyms
- Trigla gurnardus Linnaeus, 1758; Chelidonichthys gurnardus (Linnaeus, 1758); Trigla milvus Lacepède, 1801

= Grey gurnard =

Species of fish

The grey gurnard (Eutrigla gurnardus) is a species of ray-finned fish from the family Triglidae, the gurnards and sea robins. It is native to the eastern Atlantic Ocean, the Mediterranean Sea, and the Black Sea. It is caught as a food fish and is known for producing sounds. It is the only member of the monotypic genus Eutrigla.

== Taxonomy ==
The grey gurnard was first formally described in 1758 as Trigla gurnardus by Carl Linnaeus in the 10th edition of the Systema Naturae with the type locality given as "British seas". In 1938 the British ichthyologist Alec Frederick Fraser-Brunner classified this species within the monotypic genus Eutrigla. The genus name combines the prefix eu meaning "well" or "very" with the genus name Trigla, this species has enlarged, bony, keeled scales along its lateral line. The specific name is a latinisation of the English word gurnard.

== Description ==
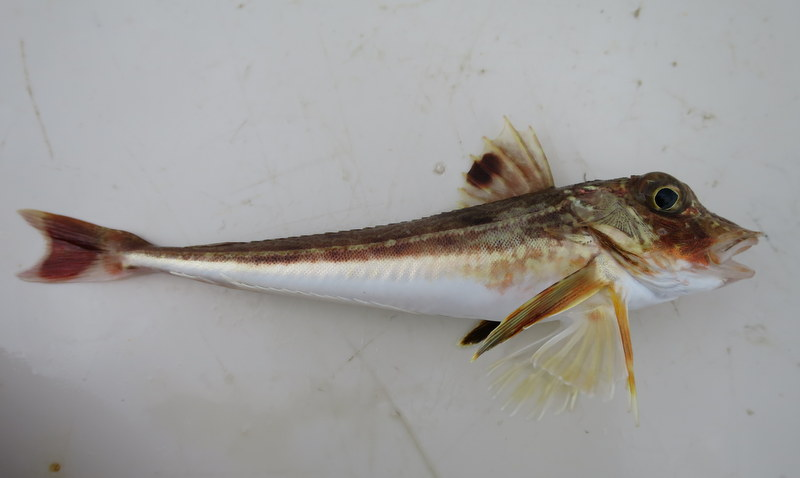
Grey gurnard, Scotland

The grey gurnard has a large head but does not have a deep occipital groove. There are two dorsal fins, the first has 7–10 spines and the second has 18–20 rays. The anal fin has 17–20 rays, the pectoral fins are short, just extending as far as the anal fin origin. The scales along the lateral line are slightly larger than the scales covering the body, and have a spiny keel and a toothed rear edge. The breast is naked of scales while the belly is partially covered in scales. The colour of this fish is variable but it is usually greyish-brown, rarely dull red, and tinged with red on its back and flanks. The underside is cream coloured and the back and flanks are usually covered with small white spots. The first dorsal fin has a large, circular black mark. It can grow to a maximum total length of 60 centimetres (24 in), although a more common total length is 30 centimetres (12 in) while the maximum published weight is 956 grams (2.108 lb).

== Distribution ==
The grey gurnard occurs in the eastern Atlantic Ocean from Iceland and Norway south to Morocco, it is found in the North Sea and the southern Baltic Sea as well as off Madeira. In the Mediterranean Sea, its range extends from eastern Spain to Turkey and into the Black Sea.

== Habitat and biology ==
The grey gurnard is a common fish on sandy seabeds but it does occur infrequently on rocky substrates, as well as in mud areas from the shoreline down to 140 metres (460 ft). In the eastern Ionian Sea it has been recorded as deep as 340 metres (1,120 ft). It is a predatory species which feeds on crustaceans, largely shrimps and shore crabs, and small fish, such as gobies, flatfish, young Atlantic herring and sand eels. As with other sea robins, grey gurnards produce sounds. Sound production in this species is often associated with competition for food. Small individuals produce more sounds than larger ones, and emit more "grunts" than "knocks", probably because they more often compete for food by contest tactics whereas larger specimens predominantly scramble for food. In Ireland, the fish has been called the cuckoo fish, knoud, or noud.

== Fisheries ==
Grey gurnards are of commercial importance as a food. The main producers of grey gurnards are China, Taiwan, and Japan. These three countries account for the vast majority of the world's production, with China alone accounting for over 60% of the total. Other significant producers include Indonesia, India, and Vietnam

== See also ==
- List of fish of Great Britain
