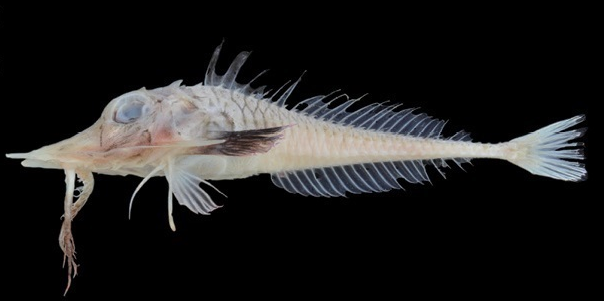
- Scalicus amiscus

Scientific classification
- Kingdom: Animalia
- Phylum: Chordata
- Class: Actinopterygii
- Order: Perciformes
- Family: Triglidae
- Subfamily: Peristediinae
- Genus: Scalicus; D. S. Jordan, 1923

Type species
- Peristedion amiscus D. S. Jordan & Starks, 1904

Synonyms
- Nemaperistedion Fowler, 1938

= Scalicus =

Genus of fishes

Scalicus is a genus of marine ray-finned fish belonging to the subfamily Peristediinae, the armoured gurnards or armored searobins. These fishes are found in the Indo-Pacific region.

== Taxonomy ==
Scalicus was first described as a monotypic genus in 1923 by the American ichthyologist David Starr Jordan with the newly described Peristedion amiscus, designated as its type species. Within the family Peristediidae there are 2 clades, this genus is in the clade consisting of 5 genera, with the nominate genus Peristedion in the other clade. Jordan did not explain the genus name's etymology but it may be from skallo meaning "hoe", an allusion top the shovel shaped snout of the type species.

== Species ==
Scalicus currently has 8 recognised species within it:

- Scalicus amiscus D. S. Jordan & Starks, 1904
- Scalicus engyceros Günther, 1872
- Scalicus gilberti D. S. Jordan, 1921
- Scalicus hians C. H. Gilbert & Cramer, 1897
- Scalicus investigatoris Alcock, 1898
- Scalicus orientalis Fowler, 1938
- Scalicus paucibarbatus Kawai, 2019
- Scalicus quadratorostratus Fourmanoir & Rivaton, 1979
- Scalicus serrulatus Alcock, 1898

Some authorities recognise 6 valid species, treating S. amiscus as a junior synonym of S. hains and both S. gilberti and S, investigatoris as a junior synonyms of S. engyceros.

== Characteristics ==
Scalicus armoured gurnards have no teeth in the upper jaw, a smooth lateral margin of the head. The rear pairs of the lower lateral rows of scutes are not joined to each other, The lower jaw has barbels which are not branched, apart from the rearmost barbels on the lip and chin. The number of soft rays in the second dorsal fin and the anal fin both exceed 19. The smallest of these fishes is S. quadratorostratus which has a maximum published standard length of 14.9 cm (5.9 in) while the largest is S. engyceros which has a maximum published total length of 32 cm (13 in).

== Distribution and habitat ==
Scalicus armoured gurnards are demersal, deep water fishes which are found in the Indian Ocean from the eastern costa of Africa to Hawaii.
