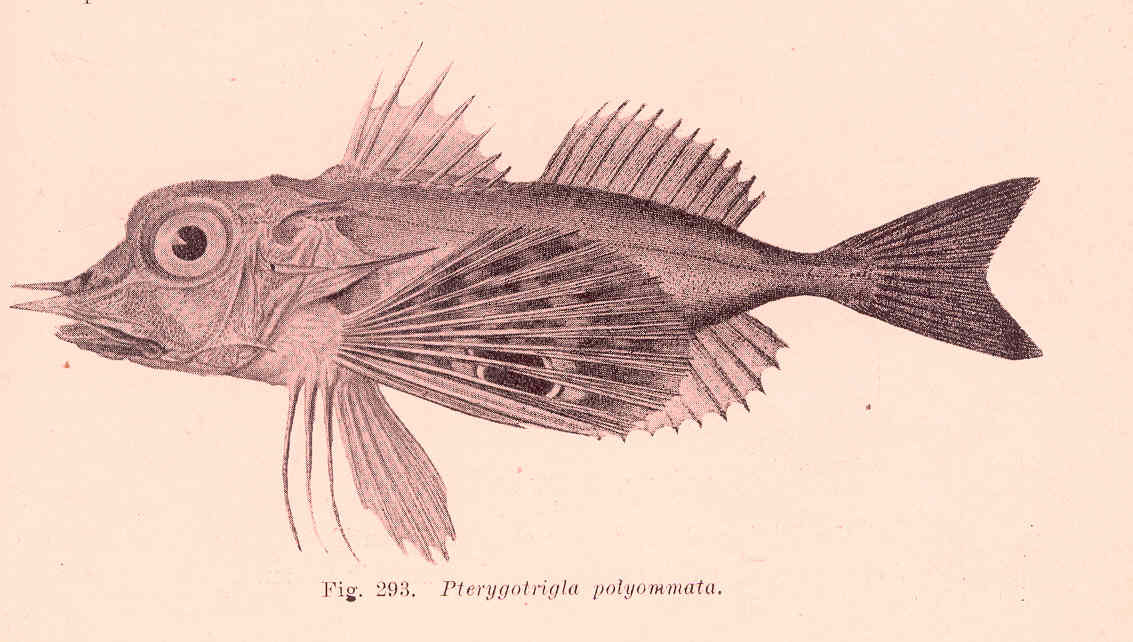

Scientific classification
- Kingdom: Animalia
- Phylum: Chordata
- Class: Actinopterygii
- Order: Perciformes
- Family: Triglidae
- Genus: Pterygotrigla
- Subgenus: Pterygotrigla
- Species: P. polyommata

Binomial name
- Pterygotrigla polyommata (Richardson, 1839)

Synonyms
- Trigla polyommata Richardson, 1839

= Pterygotrigla polyommata =

Species of fish

Pterygotrigla polyommata, the latchet, butterfly gurnard, flying gurnard, lachet gurnard, pastry, sharpbeak gurnard, spiny gurnard or spinybeak gurnard, is a species of marine ray-finned fish belonging to the family Triglidae, the gurnards and sea robins. It is found in the southeastern Indian and southwestern Pacific Oceans.

== Taxonomy ==
Pterygotrigla polyommata was first formally described as Trigla polyommata in 1839 by the Scottish naval surgeon, Arctic explorer and naturalist John Richardson with the type locality given as Port Arthur, Tasmania. In 1867 Alphonse Guichenot created the genus Hoplonotus with its only species beingRichardson's T. polyommata, however, this genus name was preoccupied by a genus of beetles and in 1899 Edgar Ravenswood Waite proposed the new name Pterygotrigla to replace it. This species is, therefore the type species of the genus and of the subgenus of the same name. The specific name polyommata is a combination of poly, which means "many", and ommata, meaning "eyed", an allusion to the two large, adjoining, black spots with thin white edges, like eyes, on the pectoral fins.

== Description ==
Pterygotrigla polyommata has a moderately deep and long body, tapering towards the caudal peduncle. It has a modreately large oblong, bony head, with a deeply depression between the eyes. There are long spines on the operculum, over the base of the pectoral fins and on the bony protuberance on either side of the origin of the dorsal fin. There are two long, forward directed spines on the snout. The scales are very small and cycloid and cover all of the body apart from the nape and the forward part of the belly. The dorsal fin is separated into two fins, the first has 7 or 8 spines and is tall and has a curved profile, while the second has 12 soft rays and is elongate, slightly shorter with a straighter profile. The anal fin is similar to the second dorsal and the caudal fin is forked. The large pectoral fins extend beyond the tips of the pelvic fins and have their lowest 3 rays thickened and separate from the fin membrane. The colour reddish changing to silvery below, with red to brownish blotches below both the dorsal fins. The pectoral fins are a purplish colour speckled with white on their outer surface, with the inner surface being blue to purple crossed by wide bands of olive to bright yellow bands or lines of spots. There are two large white margined black spots at their bases. The dorsal and caudal fins are red, the anal fin is white and the pelvic fins are pinkish. This species has a maximum published total length of 62 cm (24 in).

== Distribution and habitat ==
Pterygotrigla polyommata is found in the southeastern Indian Ocean and southwestern Pacific Ocean off southern Australia and New Zealand. In Australia it is found from Shark Bay in Western Australia east along the south coast, including Tasmania, to Sydney in New South Wales. In New Zealand it is rare in northern New Zealand. The latchet is found in sandy or muddy habitats, it is known to enter shallow estuaries in southern Tasmania.

== Fisheries ==
Pterygotrigla polyommata is frequently caught by trawlers and the catch is sold in fish markets, however, the flesh is not as highly regarded as that of the red gurnard (Chelidonichthys kumu).
