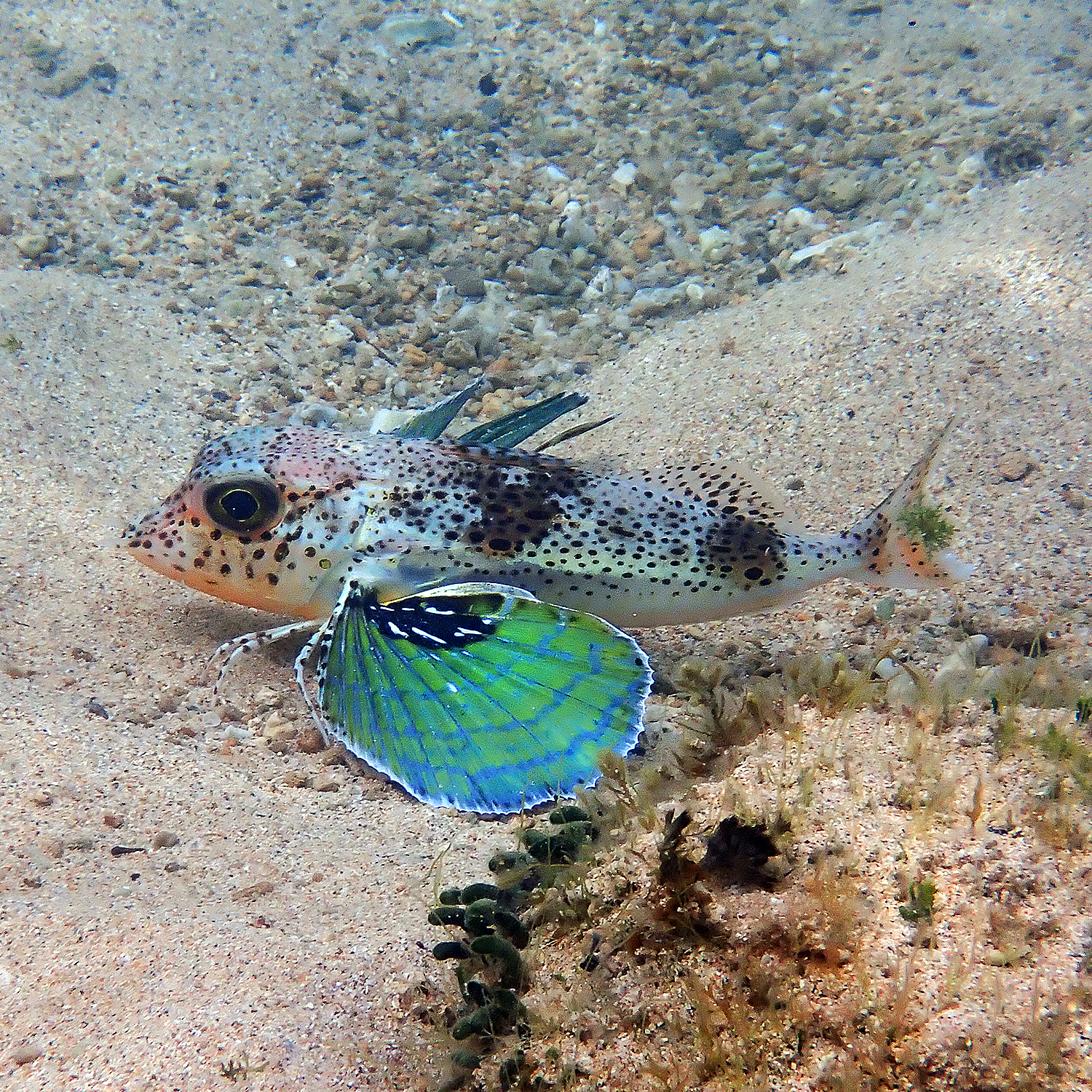
- Off Norfolk Island

Scientific classification
- Kingdom: Animalia
- Phylum: Chordata
- Class: Actinopterygii
- Order: Perciformes
- Family: Triglidae
- Genus: Pterygotrigla
- Species: P. andertoni

Binomial name
- Pterygotrigla andertoni Waite, 1910

= Pterygotrigla andertoni =

Species of fish

Pterygotrigla andertoni, the painted latchet, is a species of ray-finned fish belonging to the family Triglidae, the gurnards and sea robins. The species is found around eastern Australia, New Caledonia and New Zealand. They live on the sea floor at depths of 90–500 m, usually below 200 m. They are good eating, but rarely caught.
