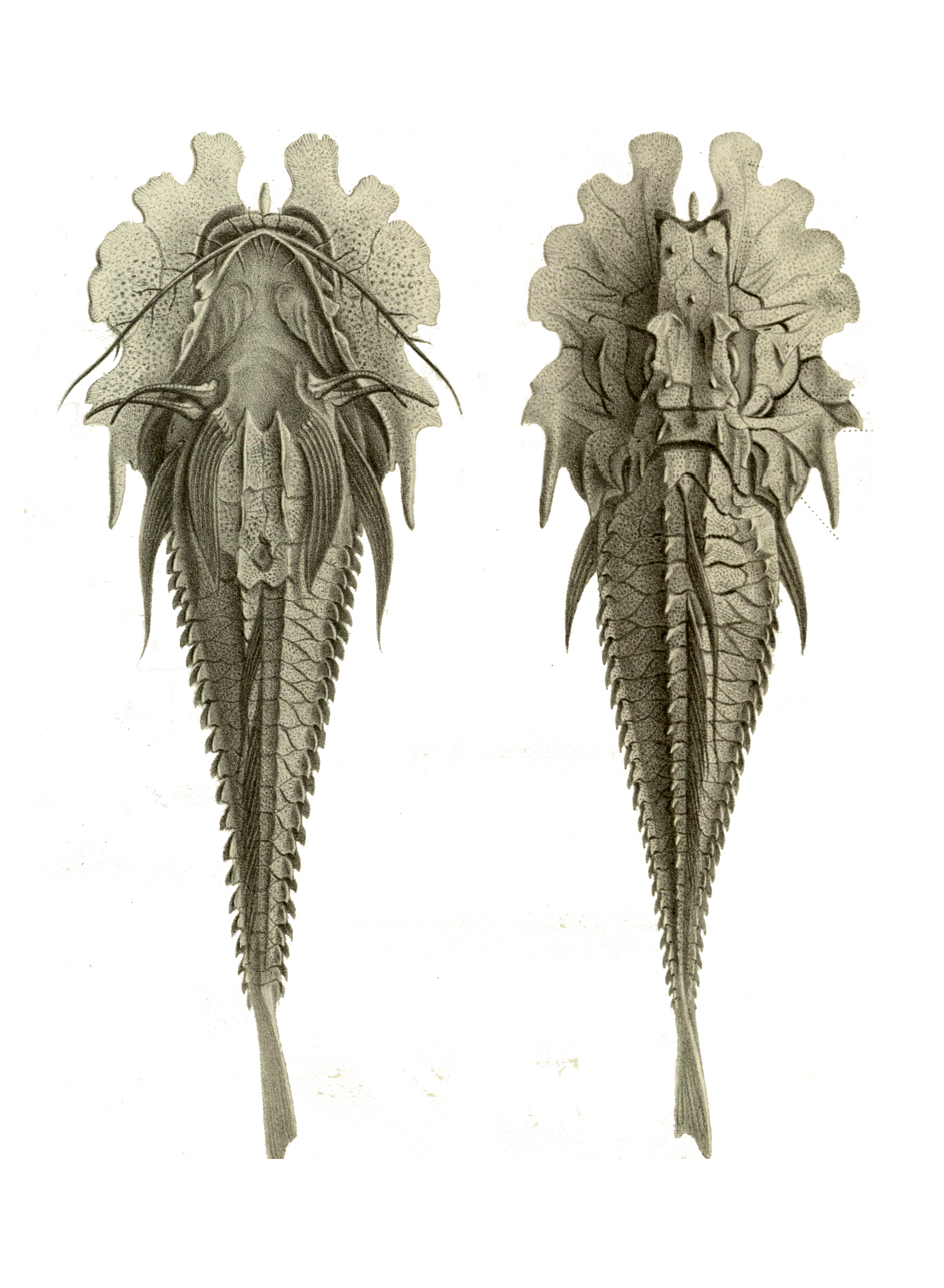

Scientific classification
- Kingdom: Animalia
- Phylum: Chordata
- Class: Actinopterygii
- Order: Perciformes
- Family: Triglidae
- Genus: Gargariscus; H. M. Smith, 1917
- Species: G. prionocephalus

Binomial name
- Gargariscus prionocephalus (A. H. A. Duméril, 1869)

Synonyms
- Peristethidion prionocephalum Duméril, 1869; Peristedion undulatum Weber, 1913; Gargariscus undulatus (Weber, 1913); Gargariscus semidentatus H. M. Smith, 1917

= Jaggedhead gurnard =

Species of fish

The jaggedhead gurnard (Gargariscus prionocephalus) is a species of marine ray-finned fish belonging to the subfamily Peristediinae, the armoured gurnards or armored searobins. This species is found in the eastern Indian Ocean and the western Pacific Ocean. It is the only known member of its genus.

== Taxonomy ==
The jaggedhead gurnard was first formally described as Peristethidion prionocephalum in 1869 by the French zoologist Auguste Duméril with the type locality given as Sulawesi. In 1917, Hugh McCormick Smith described a new species Gargariscus semidentatus and placed it in a new monotypic genus Gargariscus. This taxon was subsequently regarded as a junior synonym of Duméril‘s P. prionocephalum, although Smith's genus has been recognised as valid. The genus name Gargariscus means "gullet" or "throat", an allusion Smith did not explain but may refer to the wide band of teeth on the premaxillaries. The specific name prionocephalum is a combination of prion, meaning "saw" and cephalus, which means "head", referring to the serrations on the edge of the head shield.

== Description ==
The jaggedhead gurnard has a wide shield over the head, with saw-like serrations along its margin, and large barbels on the lower jaw. The head is triangular in shape and flattened with a short, wide process on the rostrum and a robust and sharp spine on the preoperculum. The colour is orange to reddish-orange with black bands on the pectoral fin and a black edged dorsal fin. This species attains a maximum total length of 30 cm (12 in).

== Distribution and habitat ==
The jaggedhead gurnard is found in the Indo-Pacific where it has been recorded from: Japan south to the Philippines and the Arafura Sea. In Australia it has been recorded from Darwin to North West Cape in Western Australia. It is a deepwater fish of the continental shelf, down to 340 m (1,120 ft).

== Biology ==
The jaggedhead gurnard can "walk" along the seabed using the separate lower fin rays of its pectoral fins, glide over the substrate by extending its pectoral fins, and use the barbels on its lower jaws to search for food.
