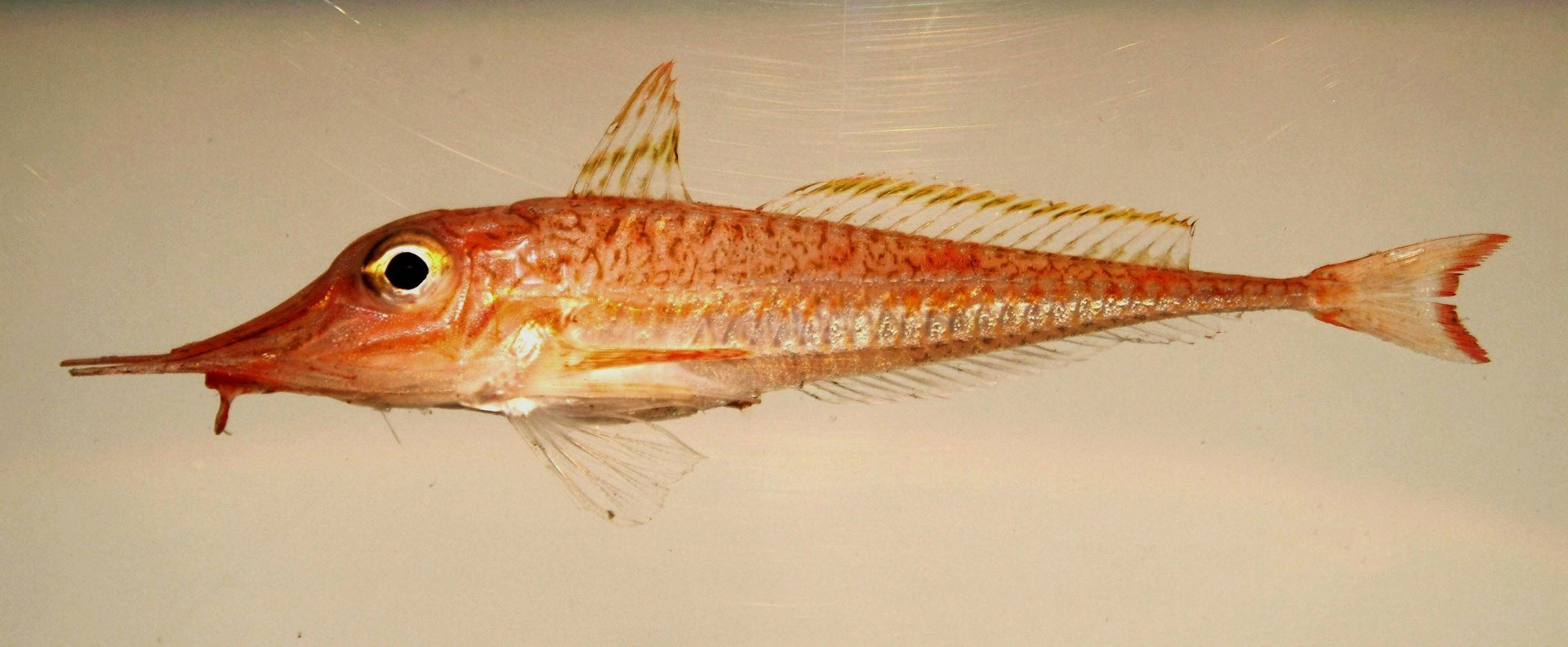
- Peristedion gracile
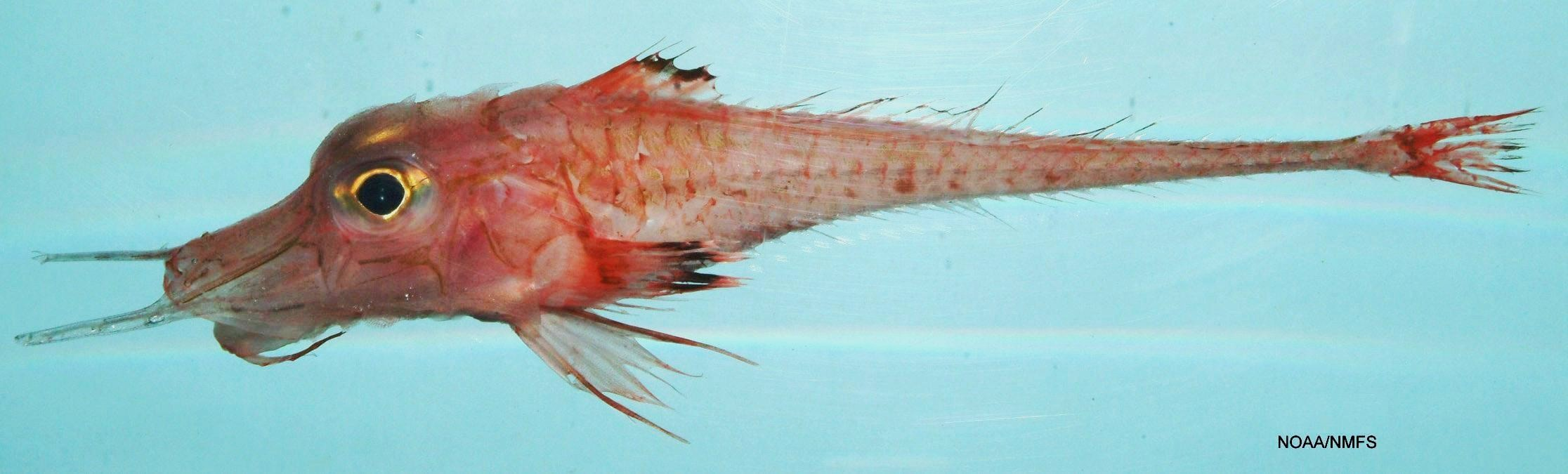
- Peristedion miniatum

Scientific classification
- Kingdom: Animalia
- Phylum: Chordata
- Class: Actinopterygii
- Order: Perciformes
- Family: Triglidae
- Subfamily: Peristediinae
- Genus: Peristedion; Lacépède, 1801

Type species
- Peristedion malarmat Lacépède, 1801

Synonyms
- Octonus Rafinesque, 1810; Panichthys Whitley, 1933; Peristedium Jordan & Gilbert, 1883; Peristethidium Agassiz, 1846; Peristethus Kaup, 1858; Polyacantichthys Kaup, 1873; Vulsiculus Jordan & Evermann, 1896

= Peristedion =

Genus of fishes

Peristedion is a genus of marine ray-finned fish belonging to the subfamily Peristediinae, the armoured gurnards or armored sea robins. These fishes are found in Atlantic and Indo-West Pacific ocean waters.

== Taxonomy ==
Peristedion was first described as a genus in 1801 by the French naturalist Bernard Germain de Lacépède when he described Peristedion marmalat from the Mediterranean Sea and the Moluccas. In 1826 Jean Baptiste Bory de Saint-Vincent designated P. marmalat as the type species of the genus. P. marmalat is now treated as a junior synonym of Carl Linnaeus's Trigla cataphracta, which he described from the Mediterranean Sea off southern France. Within the family Peristediidae there are 2 clades. One, which contains Peristedion, is a monotypic clade, while the other clade is made up of the remaining 5 genera of the Peristediidae. The name of the genus Peristedion is a combination of peri, meaning "around", and stedion, which is a diminutive of stethos, which is Greek for "breast" or "chest", an allusion to the bony plates lining the underside of the body, similar to a plastron, the feature Lacépède use to distinguish Peristidion from Trigla.

== Species ==
Peristedion currently contains 24 recognized species:

- Peristedion altipinne Regan, 1903
- Peristedion amblygenys Fowler, 1938
- Peristedion antillarum Teague, 1961 (Long-nose armoured searobin)
- Peristedion barbiger Garman, 1899
- Peristedion brevirostre (Günther, 1860) (Flat-head searobin)
- Peristedion cataphractum (Linnaeus, 1758) (African armoured searobin)
- Peristedion crustosum Garman, 1899
- Peristedion ecuadorense Teague, 1961
- Peristedion gracile Goode & T. H. Bean, 1896 (Slender searobin)
- Peristedion greyae G. C. Miller, 1967
- Peristedion imberbe Poey, 1861
- Peristedion liorhynchus (Günther, 1872)
- Peristedion longicornutum Fricke, Kawai, Yato & Motomura, 2017 (Longhorn armored gurnard)
- Peristedion longispatha Goode & T. H. Bean] 1886
- Peristedion miniatum Goode, 1880 (Armoured searobin)
- Peristedion nesium W. A. Bussing, 2010
- Peristedion orientale Temminck & Schlegel, 1843
- Peristedion paucibarbiger Castro-Aguirre & García-Domínguez, 1984
- Peristedion richardsi Kawai, 2016
- Peristedion riversandersoni Alcock, 1894
- Peristedion thompsoni Fowler, 1952 (Rim-spine searobin)
- Peristedion truncatum (Günther, 1880) (Black armoured searobin)
- Peristedion unicuspis G. C. Miller, 1967
- Peristedion weberi J. L. B. Smith, 1934

== Characteristics ==
Peristedion armoured gurnards have a ventrally flattened head and body which is protected by a bony armour of plates and spines. There is a two-pointed rostral projection on the snout and there are barbels under the lower jaw. They do not have robust spines on the preoperculum. The first dorsal fin has 7 or 8 spines and the second dorsal fin has between 18 and 20 soft rays while the anal fin has between 20 and 23 soft rays. There are between 11 and 13 fin rays enclosed within the membrane of the pectoral fin plus the two lowermost rays being separate. The pelvic fins are widely spaced, located under the base of the pectoral fins, and have 1 spine and 5 soft rays. The smallest species in the genus is P. paucibarbiger, which has a maximum published standard length of 7 cm (2.8 in). The largest are the African armoured sea robin (P. cataphractum) and the armoured gurnard (P. liorhynchus) both of which have maximum published standard lengths of 540 cm (210 in).

== Distribution ==
Peristedion armoured gurnards occur on either sides of the Atlantic Ocean, in the Mediterranean Sea, in the Indo-West-Pacific and eastern Pacific Ocean.
