= Toshiji Kamohara =

Japanese biologist and ichthyologist

- 蒲原 稔治
- Born: July 22, 1901; Gotaisan, Nagaoka District, Kochi Prefecture, Japan
- Died: March 26, 1972 (aged 70); Japan
- Education: Matsuyama Higher School; Tokyo Imperial University
- Known for: Taxonomic research on Japanese fishes
- Scientific career
- Fields: Biology, ichthyology
- Workplaces: Kochi Higher School; Kochi University; Nagoya Health and Hygiene University
- Academic advisors: Shigeho Tanaka

Toshiji Kamohara (蒲原 稔治, Kamohara Toshiji; 22 July 1901 – 26 March 1972) was a Japanese biologist and ichthyologist. He conducted extensive research on fish, particularly those inhabiting Tosa Bay, and described numerous new species.

== Biography ==
=== Early life and education ===
Kamohara was born on 22 July 1901 in Gotaisan Village, Nagaoka District, Kochi Prefecture, Japan.

In 1919, after graduating from Kochi Prefectural First Middle School (now Kochi Prefectural Otemae High School), he enrolled at the Postal Officials Training Institute in Tokyo. However, he withdrew later that year.

In 1920, he entered the science preparatory course (Class A) at Matsuyama Higher School. In 1923, he enrolled in the Department of Zoology, Faculty of Science, Tokyo Imperial University. He graduated in 1926.

In the same year, he joined the 5th Transport Battalion of the Imperial Japanese Army. He was placed on reserve status in 1927 and subsequently became an appointed lecturer in zoology at the former Kochi Higher School.

=== Academic career ===
In 1928, Kamohara became a professor at Kochi Higher School and began conducting taxonomic research on fishes. He studied under the ichthyologist Shigeho Tanaka.

In 1938, he was called up for military service and joined the 8th Company of the 11th Mountain Artillery Regiment at Zentsuji. He returned to his academic position on 30 April 1939. In the same year, he received a Doctor of Science degree.

In 1949, following the establishment of Kochi University, Kamohara became a professor in its Faculty of Liberal Arts and Sciences.

In 1950, during the postwar imperial tour of Kochi Prefecture by Emperor Shōwa, Kamohara, serving as president of the Tosa Biological Society, explained the plant communities of Cape Muroto to the Emperor.

In 1953, following the establishment of the Marine Biological Laboratory attached to the Faculty of Liberal Arts and Sciences at Kochi University, he also became its director.

Kamohara retired from Kochi University in 1965 upon reaching the mandatory retirement age. In 1968, he became a professor at Nagoya Health and Hygiene University (now Fujita Health University).

He died of a cerebral infarction on 26 March 1972, at the age of 70.

== Publications ==
- Shinkai no Gyozoku (深海の魚族; Deep-Sea Fishes), Nihon Shuppansha, 1949.
- Tosa no Sakana (土佐の魚; Fishes of Tosa), Kochi Prefectural Education Association, 1949.
- Tosa oyobi Kishu no Gyorui (土佐及び紀州の魚類; Fishes of Tosa and Kishu), Kochi Prefectural Education Association, 1950.
- Genshoku Nihon Gyorui Zukan, Volume 5 (原色日本魚類図鑑 第5; Illustrated Guide to the Fishes of Japan in Colour), Hoikusha, 1955.
- Hyojun Genshoku Zukan Zenshu, Volume 4 (標準原色図鑑全集 第4巻; Standard Illustrated Colour Encyclopedia), Hoikusha, 1966.
