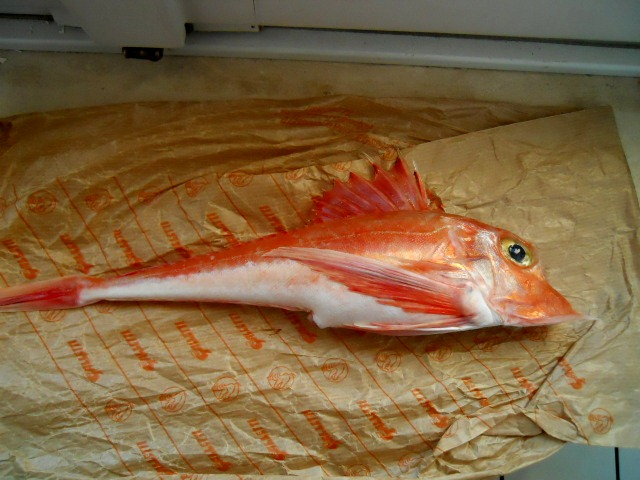

Conservation status
- Least Concern (IUCN 3.1)

Scientific classification
- Kingdom: Animalia
- Phylum: Chordata
- Class: Actinopterygii
- Division: Teleostei
- Order: Perciformes
- Family: Triglidae
- Subfamily: Triglinae
- Genus: Trigla; Linnaeus, 1758
- Species: T. lyra

Binomial name
- Trigla lyra Linnaeus, 1758

Synonyms
- Trigla fagianus Rafinesque, 1810

= Piper gurnard =

Piper gurnard Temporal range: Middle Miocene to present

Species of fish

The piper gurnard (Trigla lyra), also known as the piper or the lyre gurnard, is a species of marine, demersal ray-finned fish from the family Triglidae, the gurnards and sea robins. It is found in the eastern Atlantic Ocean and the Mediterranean Sea. It is the only species in the monotypic genus Trigla.

== Taxonomy ==
The piper gurnard was first formally described in 1758 by Carl Linnaeus in the 10th edition of his Systema Naturae with its type locality given as "British Seas". It is the only species in the monotypic genus Trigla which is classified within the subfamily Triglinae, within the family Triglidae. In 1883 David Starr Jordan and Charles Henry Gilbert designated this species as the type species of the genus Trigla, which was not thought to be monotypic at that time. The genus name, Trigla, is a classical name for the red mullet (Mullus barbatus); Artedi thought the red mullet and the gurnards were the same because fishes from both taxa are known to create sounds taken out of the water as well as being red in colour. Linnaeus realised they were different and classified Trigla as a gurnard, in contradiction of the ancient usage. The specific name lyra means "lyre", an allusion Linnaeus did not explain; it may refer to the protuberances, plates and spines of the head together creating a lyre-like shape when looked at from above.

In addition to the extant piper gurnard, a few fossil Trigla species have also been described. †Trigla licatae Sauvage, 1870 is known from an imperfect skeleton from the Late Miocene (Messinian) of Italy, while †Trigla infausta Heckel, 1861 is known from a partial articulated skeleton from the Leitha Limestone of Austria. The placement of T. infausta as a species of Trigla is uncertain. †T. nardii de Bosniaski, 1878 is a nomen nudum from the Late Miocene of Italy, while †T. simonellii Bonomi, 1896 from the Late Miocene of Italy is a small, indeterminate fish.

== Description ==
The piper gurnard has a large head bearing numerous spines and ridges, but lacking a deep occipital groove. The first dorsal fin has between 8 and 10 spines, the forward edge of the first dorsal fin spine is smooth. Both the second dorsal and the anal fin contain 15 or 16 soft rays. There are no scales on the breast and the belly is only partially covered in scales. The scales in the lateral line are small and tubular. The caudal fin is slightly concave. The pelvic fins are well developed and have a single spine and 5 soft rays. The pectoral fins are even larger, reaching up to the front rays of the second dorsal fin and the lower 3 rays are separate, thickened and fingerlike, as is typical of the gurnards. The upper body us red in colour while the lower body is pale. The anal and pectoral fin membranes are dusky, marked with small blue spots. The maximum published total length for this species is 60 cm (24 in), although 30 cm (12 in) is more usual.

== Distribution and habitat ==
The piper gurnard is found in the eastern Atlantic from Scotland south to Walvis Bay in Namibia, including the Macaronesian Islands and the Gulf of Guinea Islands, it is found in the Mediterranean Sea but not the Black Sea. It is a deepwater demersal fish found at depths as deep as 700 m (2,300 ft) and prefers sandy and muddy substrates.

== Biology ==
The piper gurnard has a diet dominated by crustaceans, especially the neritic species, like schools of shrimps, but also benthic species, such as crabs and hermit crabs. It will also eat echinoderms, particularly the brittle stars, polychaetes and the small benthic fishes. Sexual maturity is attained at around 30 cm (12 in) and the pelagic eggs are spawned in the summer months. The larvae are already armoured with bony plates and some spines. These fish may live for up to 7 years.

== Fisheries ==
The piper gurnard is not targeted, and not exported, in the eastern central Atlantic but it is caught and consumed on local scales. However, in the Mediterranean this species is subjected to a commercial fishery and is a regular item for sale in markets in Morocco, Greece and Turkey, ad occasionally elsewhere. the flesh is sold fresh or refrigerated.

== See also ==
- List of prehistoric bony fish
