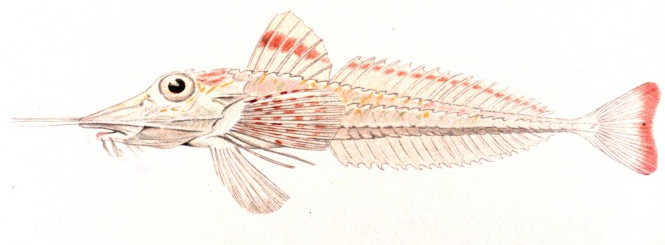
- Illustration of Slender searobin, Peristedion gracile
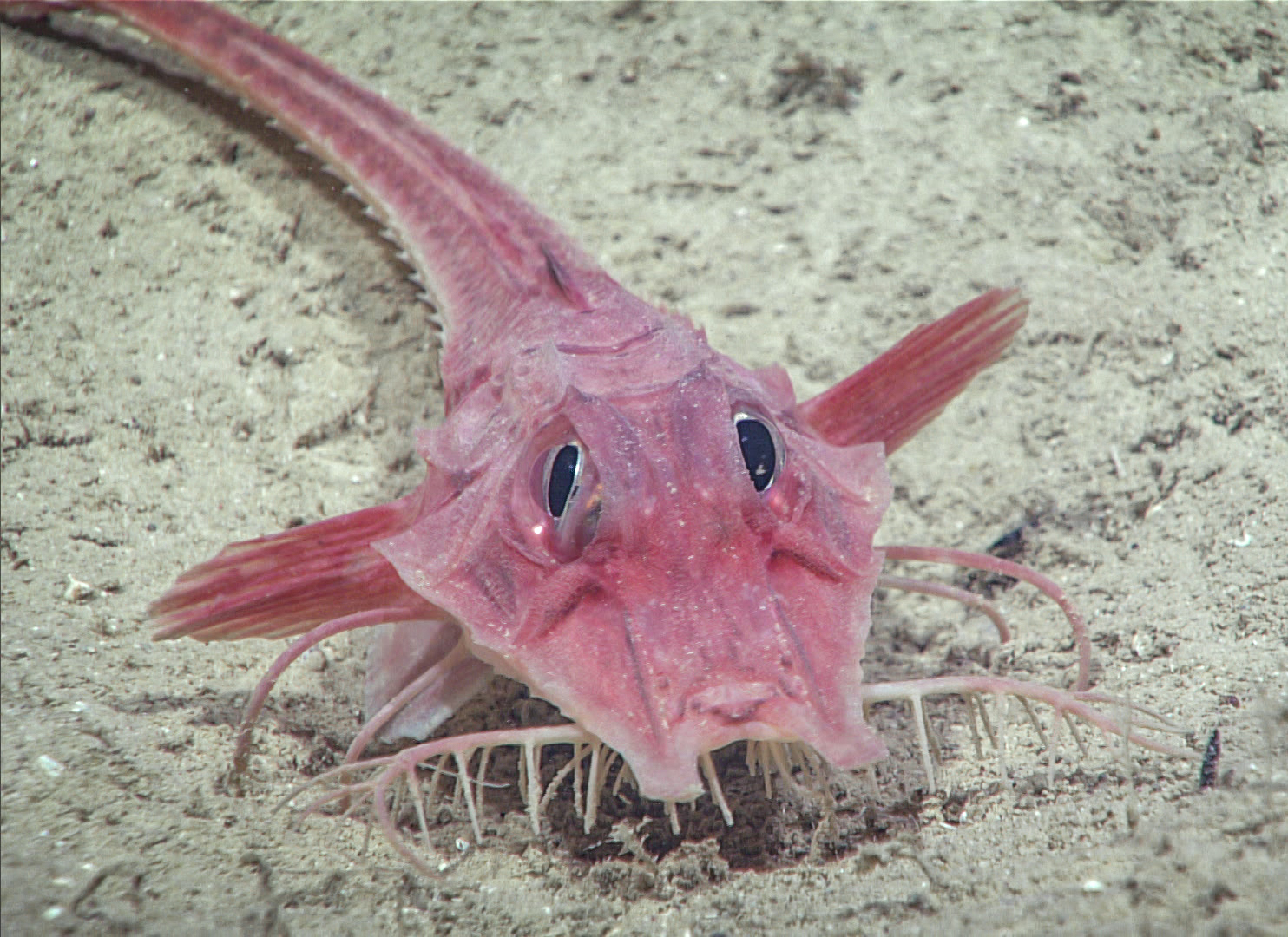
- An armored searobin near the southeastern United States in 2019

Scientific classification
- Kingdom: Animalia
- Phylum: Chordata
- Class: Actinopterygii
- Order: Perciformes
- Family: Triglidae
- Subfamily: Peristediinae; D. S. Jordan & C. H. Gilbert, 1883

Genera
- see text

= Peristediinae =

Family of fishes

Peristediinae, the armored sea robins or armoured gurnards, is a subfamily of ray-finned fishes belonging to the sea robin family Triglidae in the order Perciformes. They are found in the deep water in the tropical and warm temperate of the world's oceans.

== Taxonomy ==
Peristediidae was first proposed as a family in 1883 by the American ichthyologists David Starr Jordan and Charles Henry Gilbert. The 5th edition of Fishes of the World classified the family within the Platycephaloidei, which is a suborder of the order Scorpaeniformes. More recent authorities differ and do not consider the Scorpaeniformes to be a valid order because the Perciformes is not monophyletic without the taxa within the Scorpaeniformes being included within it. These authorities consider the Peristediidae to belong to the suborder Triglioidei, along with the family Triglidae, within the Perciformes. Presently, Eschmeyer's Catalog of Fishes includes it within the Triglidae as the subfamily Peristediinae, and place the Triglidae in the suborder Scorpaenoidei.

=== Genera ===
The subfamily Peristediinae is classified into about 45 species in 6 genera:

- Gargariscus H. M. Smith, 1917
- Heminodus H. M. Smith, 1917
- Paraheminodus Kamohara, 1958
- Peristedion Lacépède, 1801
- Satyrichthys Kaup, 1873
- Scalicus Jordan, 1923

Taxonomists working on the armoured gurnards have found that the family is monophyletic and that it divides into two clades, one consisting of only the genus Peristedion and the other 5 genera making up the other clade.

=== Etymology ===
Peristediinae takes its name from the genus Peristedion which is a combination of peri, meaning "around", and stedion, which is a diminutive of stethos, which is Greek for "breast" or "chest", an allusion to the bony plates lining the underside of the body, similar to a plastron, the feature Lacépède use to distinguish Peristidion from Trigla.

== Characteristics ==
Peristediinae fishes have the body encased in 4 rows of thick scutes, each plate is spined, on each side of the body. The mouth is under the snout with barbels on the lower jaw. Each of the preorbitals have a forward pointing projection. There are no scales on the head and body. The head is large and bony with numerous spines and ridges with a wide snout which is flattened on the top and bottom. They have no teeth and usually no tongue, although where there is a tongue it is simple and forked. There are two separate dorsal fins; the first contains between 7 and 9 spines while the second has between 16 and 23 segmented soft rays. The anal fin contains between 16 and 23 soft rays. The pectoral fins are short with joined rays and the lower 2 are free from the membrane. The swimbladder has one lobe. The smallest species in the family is Peristedion paucibarbiger which has a maximum published standard length of 7 cm (2.8 in) while the largest species is the black-finned armoured-gurnard (Satyrichthys moluccensis) which has a maximum standard length of 48 cm (19 in).

== Distribution and habitat ==
Peristediinae fishes are found in the warmer waters of the Atlantic, Indian and Pacific Oceans. These fishes are found on continental or insular slopes, typically at depths greater than 180 m (590 ft).
