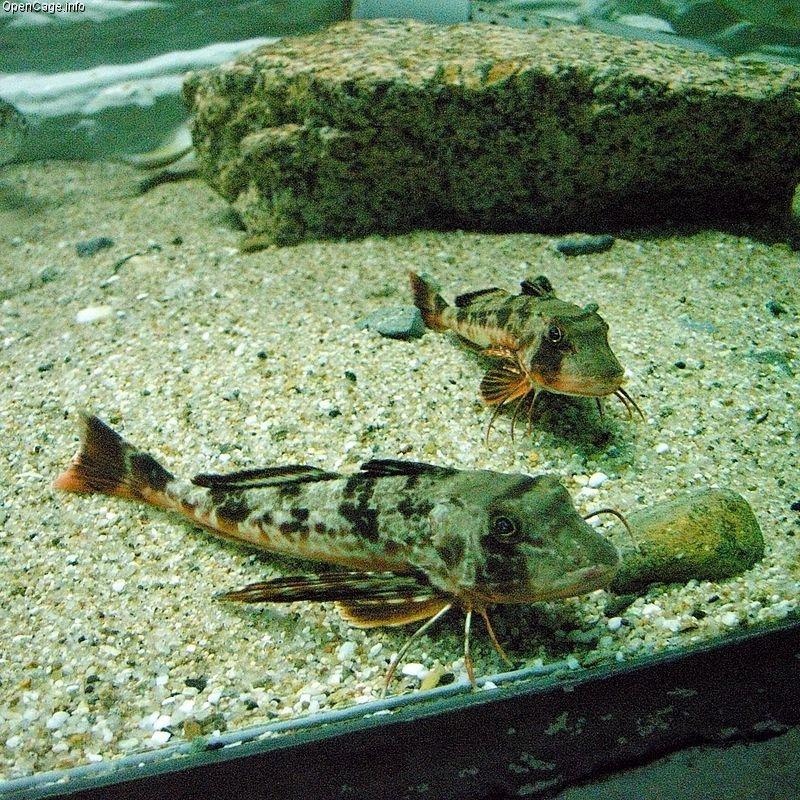
- Spiny red gurnard (Chelidonichthys spinosus)

Scientific classification
- Kingdom: Animalia
- Phylum: Chordata
- Class: Actinopterygii
- Division: Teleostei
- Order: Perciformes
- Suborder: Scorpaenoidei
- Family: Triglidae; Rafinesque, 1815

Subfamilies
- see text

= Triglidae =

Triglidae Temporal range: Eocene–recent, 48.6–0 Ma

Family of fishes

A Spiny red gurnard swimming and also using its "foreleg" spines

Triglidae, commonly known as gurnards or sea robins, are a family of bottom-feeding scorpaenoid ray-finned fish. The gurnards are distributed in temperate and tropical seas worldwide.

== Taxonomy ==
Triglidae was first described as a family in 1815 by the French polymath and naturalist Constantine Samuel Rafinesque. In 1883 Jordan and Gilbert formally designated Trigla lyra, which had been described by Linnaeus in 1758, as the type species of the genus Trigla and so of the family Triglidae. The 5th edition of Fishes of the World classifies this family within the suborder Platycephaloidei in the order Scorpaeniformes. Other authorities differ and do not consider the Scorpaeniformes to be a valid order because the Perciformes order is not monophyletic without the taxa within the Scorpaeniformes being included. These authorities consider the Triglidae to belong to the suborder Triglioidei, along with the family Peristediidae, within the Perciformes.

The family Peristediidae is sometimes classified as distinct, but phylogenetic analyses indicate that it nests within this family, and it is included in the Triglidae as the subfamily Peristediinae by Eschmeyer's Catalog of Fishes.

=== Etymology ===
Triglidae's name is based on that of Linnaeus's genus Trigla, the name of which is a classical name for the red mullet (Mullus barbatus), Artedi thought the red mullet and the gurnards were the same as fishes from both taxa are known to create sounds taken out of the water as well as being red in color. Linnaeus realized they were different and classified Trigla as a gurnard, in contradiction of the ancient usage. They get one of their common names, sea robin, from the orange ventral surface of the species in the genus Prionotus, and from large pectoral fins which resemble a bird's wings. When caught, they make a croaking noise similar to a frog, which has given them the onomatopoeic name gurnard.

=== Subfamilies and genera ===
Triglidae is divided into 4 subfamilies and 14 genera as listed below (including about 170 species). Some sources also include Trigloporus as a separate genus, but it is treated here as a subgenus of Chelidonichthys.

- Prionotinae Kaup, 1873
  - Bellator Jordan & Evermann, 1896 (8 species)
  - Prionotus Lacépède, 1801 (23 species)
- Peristediinae Jordan & Gilbert, 1883
  - Gargariscus H. M. Smith, 1917
  - Heminodus H. M. Smith, 1917
  - Paraheminodus Kamohara, 1958
  - Peristedion Lacépède, 1801
  - Satyrichthys Kaup, 1873
  - Scalicus Jordan, 1923
- Pterygotriglinae Fowler, 1938
  - Bovitrigla Fowler, 1938 (monotypic)
  - Pterygotrigla Waite, 1899 (31 species)
- Triglinae Rafinesque, 1815
  - Chelidonichthys Kaup, 1873 (10 species)
  - Eutrigla Fraser-Brunner, 1938 (monotypic)
  - Lepidotrigla Günther, 1860 (58 species)
  - Trigla Linnaeus, 1758 (monotypic)

These subfamilies have been given the rank of tribe, Prionotini, Pterygotriglini and Triglini, by some authorities. Prionotinae are regarded as the basal grouping with Triglinae being the most derived.

== Characteristics ==
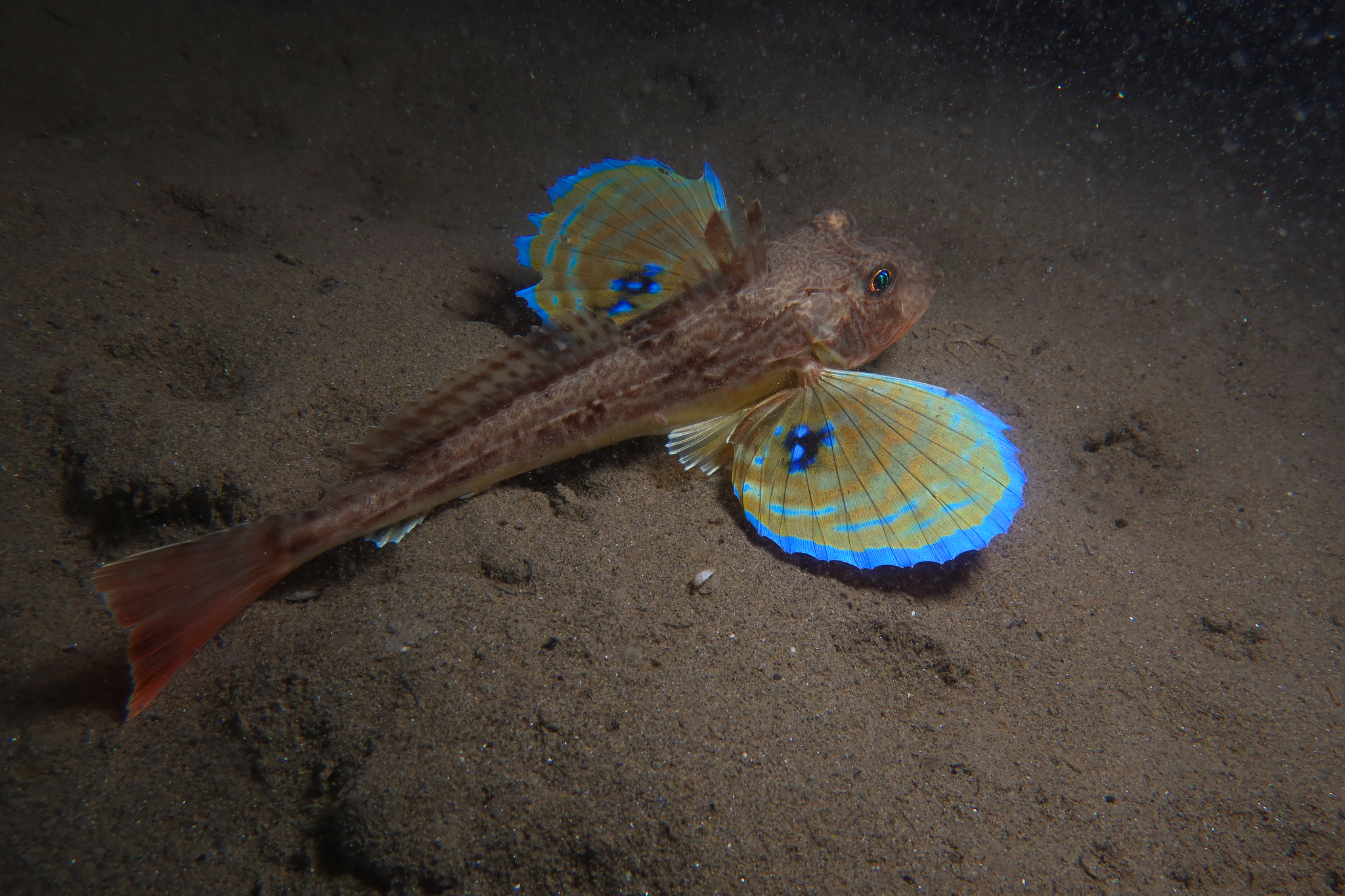
Tub gurnard, in France

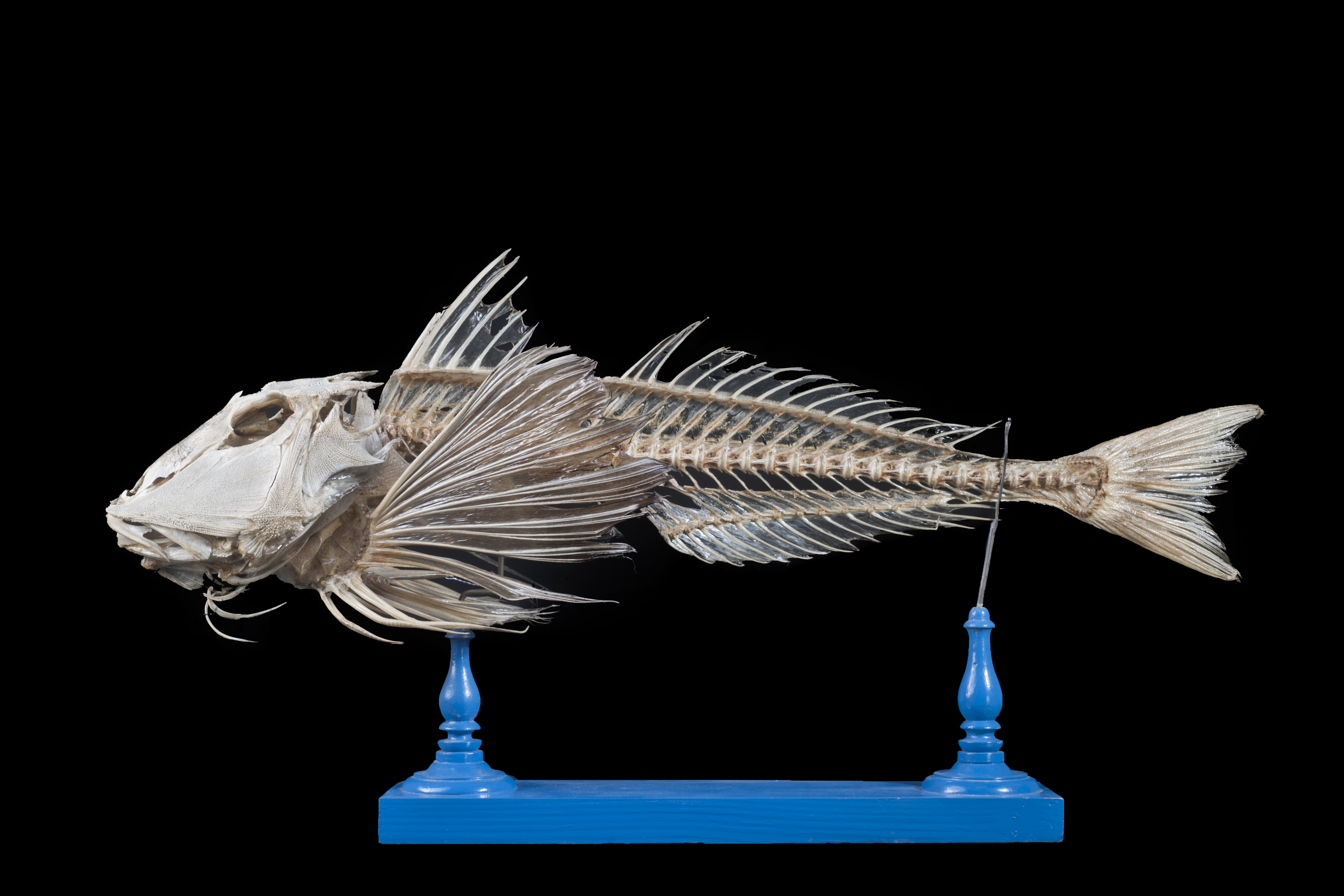
Tub gurnard skeleton

Triglidae gurnards have mouths which are either terminal or positioned slightly below the snout, which has its tip normally having paired rostral projections, frequently armed with spines, and these create the impression of a bilobed snout when seen from above. There are no barbels on the head, and the preorbital bones typically project forward. The lower three rays of the pectoral fins are enlarged and free of the fin membrane; they are said to look like legs. They have two separate dorsal fins, the first having between 7 and 11 spines while the second has 10 to 23 soft rays. The anal fin may not have any spines or it can have a single spine and 11 to 23 soft rays. The head is bony and resemble a casque. There are 9 or 10 branched rays in the caudal fin. The smallest species is the spotwing gurnard (Lepidotrigla spiloptera) which reaches a maximum total length of 10 cm (3.9 in) while the largest is the tub gurnard (Chelidonichthys lucerna) which has a maximum published total length of 75.1 cm (29.6 in).

Most species are around 30 to 40 cm (12 to 16 in) in length with the females typically being larger than the males. They have an unusually solid skull, and many species also possess armored plates on their bodies. Another distinctive feature is the presence of a "drumming muscle" that makes sounds by beating against the swim bladder. The length of the swim bladder has a negative correlation to gonadal development. A sexual dimorphism of swim bladder size is created due to the negative correlation being stronger in females then in males.

Sea robins have three "walking rays" on each side of their body. They are derived from the supportive structures in the pectoral fins, called fin-rays. During development, the fin-rays separate from the rest of the pectoral fin, developing into walking rays. These walking rays have specialized muscle divisions and unique anatomy that differ from typical fin-rays to allow them to be used as supportive structures during underwater locomotion. These walking rays have been shown to be used for locomotion as well as prey detection on the seafloor via chemoreception ("tasting") highly sensitive to the amino acids prevalent in some marine invertebrates.

== Survival and reproduction ==
Classified as carnivores, gurnards mainly feed on crustaceans. Most species are opportunistic predators and will feed on prey such as teleost and mollusks as well. Gurnards do not have a primary predator; however, larger fish, marine mammals, birds, and humans will prey on gurnards. They are bottom-dwelling fish, living down to 200 m (660 ft), although they can be found in much shallower water. When it comes to preferred water depths, adult gurnards will favor deeper water while juveniles will favor shallower water. The different genera of gurnards have diverse offspring spawning periods, varying in length and time of year. For example, tub gurnard spawning period takes place from December to March, and red gurnard spawning takes place from September to May.

== As food ==
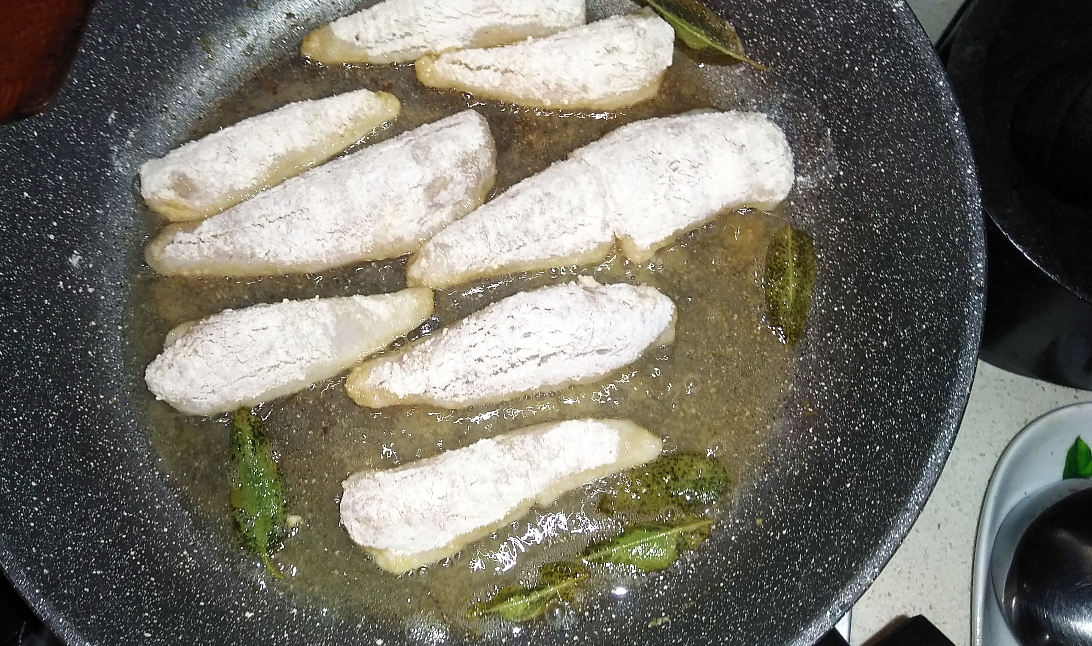
Tub gurnard pan-fried in butter and sage

Gurnard have firm white flesh that holds together well in cooking, making them well-suited to soups and stews. They are commonly used in the French dish bouillabaisse. One source describes gurnards as "rather bony and lacking in flavour"; others praise its flavour and texture.

They were often caught in British waters as a bycatch and discarded. However, as other species became less sustainable and more expensive they became more popular, with the wholesale price between 2007 and 2008 reported to have increased from £0.25 per kg to £4, and sales increasing tenfold by 2011. Gurnards also are now appearing in fish markets in the U.S.

== Angling ==
Sea robins can be caught by dropping a variety of baits and lures to the seafloor, where they actively feed. Mackerel is believed to be the most efficient bait for catching sea robins, but crabs, bunker and other fish meat can also be used successfully depending on location. Sea robins can also be caught by lure fishing if lured near the substrate. They are often considered to be rough fish, caught when fishing for more desirable fish such as striped bass or flounder. Gurnard are also used as bait, for example by lobster fishermen.
