= Red gurnard (disambiguation) =

Red gurnard may refer to:

- Chelidonichthys cuculus, East Atlantic red gurnard
- Chelidonichthys kumu, Pacific red gurnard
- Chelidonichthys spinosus, spiny red gurnard
- Helicolenus percoides, red gurnard perch or red gurnard scorpionfish
