= Longfin gurnard =

Conservation status
- Least Concern (IUCN 3.1)

Scientific classification
- Kingdom: Animalia
- Phylum: Chordata
- Class: Actinopterygii
- Order: Perciformes
- Family: Triglidae
- Genus: Chelidonichthys
- Subgenus: Aspitrigla
- Species: C. obscurus

Binomial name
- Chelidonichthys obscurus (Walbaum, 1792)

Synonyms
- Trigla obscura Walbaum, 1792; Aspitrigla obscura (Walbaum, 1792); Trigla obscura Bloch & Schneider, 1801; Aspitrigla obscura (Bloch & Schneider, 1801)

Species of fish

The longfin gurnard (Chelidonichthys obscurus), the long-finned gurnard or shining gurnard, is a species of ray-finned fish belonging to the family Triglidae, the gurnards and sea robins. This fish is found in the eastern Atlantic Ocean, including the Mediterranean Sea and the Black Sea. This species is of commercial importance as a food fish.

== Taxonomy ==
The longfin gurnard was first formally described in 1798 as Trigla obscura by the German physician, naturalist, and taxonomist Johann Julius Walbaum, with the type locality given as the Mediterranean Sea. Within the genus Chelidonichthys the longfin gurnard is classified within the subgenus Aspitrigla. The specific name obscura means "dark", "dim" or "indistinct", Walbaum did not explain this but it may refer to this species plain colour pattern in comparison to the streaked gurnard (C. lastoviza).

== Description ==
The longfin gurnard has a large head which is armoured by large bony plates characterised by many ridges and spines, with no occipital groove. There are two separate dorsal fins, the first contains 10 or 11 spines while the second has between 17 and 19 soft rays and the anal fin has 17 or 18 soft rays. The first dorsal fin spine is elongated and there are three pectoral fin rays which are separate from the fin. The scales on the lateral line are plate like. The upper body is reddish pink, the flanks are iridescent and the lower body is pale. The pectoral fins are dark blue and the other fins are yellowish. The maximum published total length of this species is 50.5 cm (19.9 in).

== Distribution and habitat ==
The Longfin gurnard is found in the Eastern Atlantic Ocean and the Mediterranean Sea. It is rare off southern England and Ireland The range extends from there south to Mauritania, including the Canary Islands, the Azores and Madeira. It is found in most of the Mediterranean, but is very rare off Turkey and absent from the Far East of that sea. It does not occur in the Black Sea. It is a demersal, benthic fish found on the continental shelf living on soft substrata and among fallen rocks. It is found at depths between 20 and 170 m (66 and 558 ft).

== Biology ==
The longfin gurnard feeds mainly on benthic invertebrates, especially mysids. Its eggs and larvae are planktonic.

== Fisheries ==
The longfin gurnard is not commercially exploited in its Atlantic range, although, it may be caught and eaten as bycatch. However, in the Mediterranean, it is of minor commercial interest. Red gurnards are regularly present in fish markets in Spain, Morocco, Italy, Cyprus, Egypt, and sometimes in France, Greece, and Turkey. It is rarely marketed in Tunisia. The catch is sold fresh, chilled and frozen.
