= Lesser gurnard =

Conservation status
- Least Concern (IUCN 3.1)

Scientific classification
- Kingdom: Animalia
- Phylum: Chordata
- Class: Actinopterygii
- Order: Perciformes
- Family: Triglidae
- Genus: Chelidonichthys
- Species: C. queketti

Binomial name
- Chelidonichthys queketti (Regan, 1904)

Synonyms
- Trigla queketti Regan, 1904

Species of fish

The lesser gurnard (Chelidonichthys queketti), or Quekket's gurnard, is a species of marine ray-finned fish belonging to the family Triglidae, the gurnards and sea robins. This species is found in the southwestern Indian Ocean and marginally in the southeastern Atlantic Ocean. This species is of commercial importance as a food fish.

== Taxonomy ==
The lesser gurnard was first formally described in 1904 as Trigla quekketi by the English zoologist Charles Tate Regan with the type locality given as the coast of Natal in South Africa. Within the genus Chelidonichthys this species is classified in the nominate subgenus. The specific name honours John Frederick Whitlie Quekett, a conchologist and the curator of the Durban Natural History Museum who gave the type of this species to the British Museum (Natural History).

== Description ==
The lesser gurnard has 9 spines and 18 or 19 soft rays in the dorsal fin while the anal fin has 17 or 18 soft rays. There are 10 or 11 finrays within the pectoral fin membrane and three fin rays which are free of the membrane. There is a large spine on the anterior part of the preorbital and smaller spines behind that which may be covered in skin. The head and upper body are reddish while the lower third of the body and the anal fin are white. The soft trayed dorsal fin and the caudal fin are reddish brown, the pectoral fin is blackish with a pinkish lower third and the pelvic fins are pinkish red with white margins. This species attains a maximum published total length of 35 cm (14 in).

== Distribution and habitat ==
The lesser gurnard is found in the southwestern Indian Ocean from Maputo Bay in Mozambique along the coast of South Africa and just into the southeastern Atlantic Ocean at Table Bay in the Western Cape. It can be found at depths between 0 and 150 m (0 and 492 ft) over sediments of many types.

== Biology ==
Lesser gurnards can live for up to 7 years. Over much of its range this species can be rare, however, it is thought to be the commonest and most numerous gurnard on the Agulhas Bank. This species is iteroparous, i.e. spawning occurs all year with a peak in the spring and in the late summer months. Females reach sexual maturity at around a year old and a length of 195 cm (77 in) and males typically out number females. These predatory fish feed on amphipods, brachyurans, polychaetes, echinoderms, crustaceans, molluscs and fishes.

== Fisheries ==
Lesser gurnards are caught as bycatch in hake fisheries, although larger specimens may be landed among catches of Cape gurnards (C. capensis). It is too uncommon to be marketed regularly.
