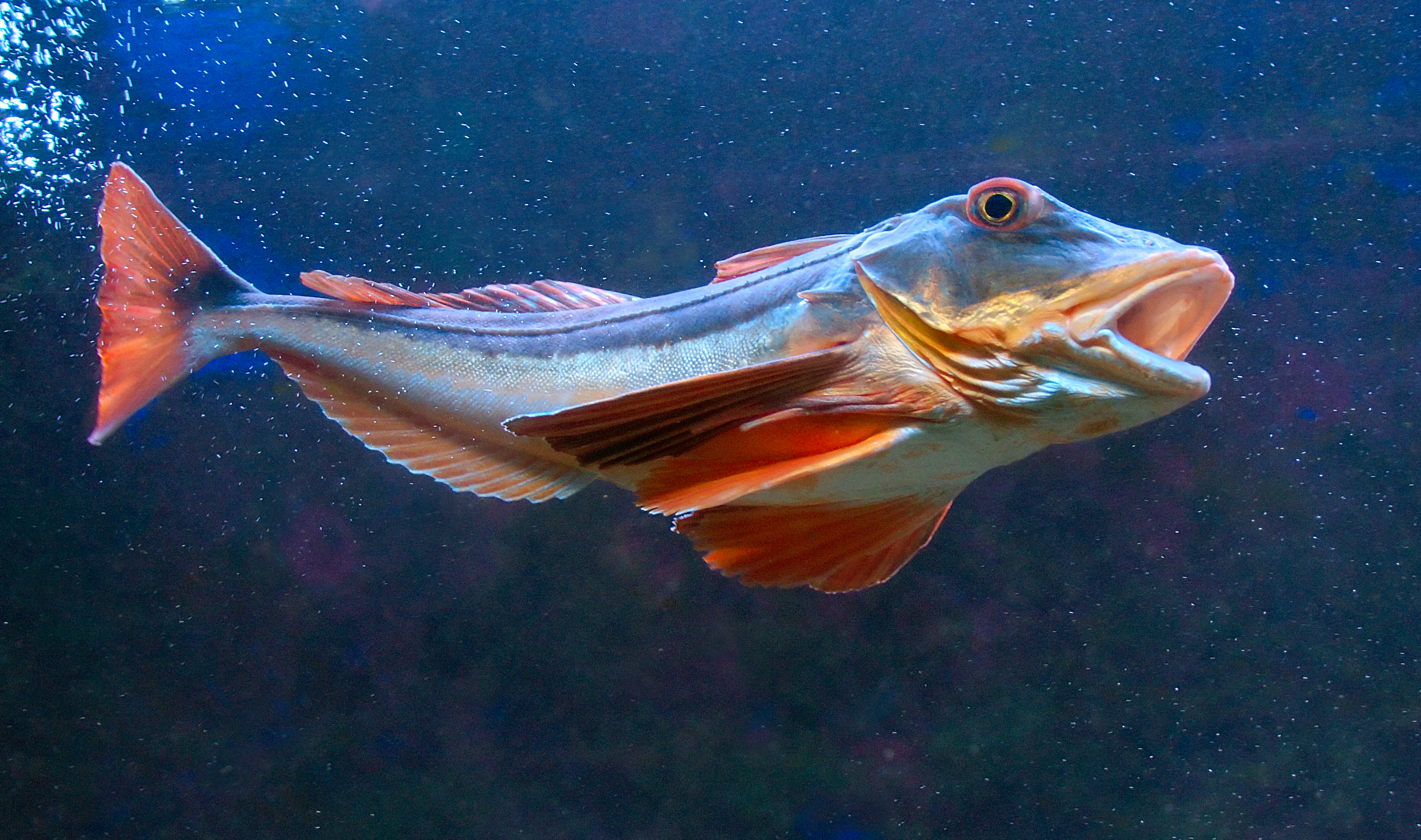

Conservation status
- Least Concern (IUCN 3.1)

Scientific classification
- Kingdom: Animalia
- Phylum: Chordata
- Class: Actinopterygii
- Division: Teleostei
- Order: Perciformes
- Family: Triglidae
- Genus: Chelidonichthys
- Subgenus: Chelidonichthys
- Species: C. lucerna

Binomial name
- Chelidonichthys lucerna (Linnaeus, 1758)

Synonyms
- Trigla lucerna Linnaeus, 1758; Trigla hirundo Linnaeus, 1758; Trigla corvus Rafinesque, 1810; Trigla corax Bonaparte, 1834

= Tub gurnard =

Species of fish

The tub gurnard (Chelidonichthys lucerna), also known as the sapphirine gurnard, tube-fish, tubfish or yellow gurnard, is a species of marine ray-finned fish belonging to the family Triglidae, the gurnards and sea robins. It is found in the eastern Atlantic Ocean. It is exploited by commercial fisheries as a food fish.

== Taxonomy ==
The tub gurnard was first formally described as Trigla lucerna in 1758 by Carl Linnaeus in the 10th edition of his Systema Naturae, with the type locality given as the "Northern Ocean". In the same publication, Linnaeus described Trigla hirundo, and in 1896 David Starr Jordan and Barton Warren Evermann designated T. hirundo as the type species of the genus Chelidonichthys, which had been described by Johann Jakob Kaup in 1876. T. hirundo is now treated as a junior synonym of T. lucerna. The specific name lucerna is Latin for "lamp" and was given to the superficially similar, but unrelated, flying gurnard (Dactylopterus volitans), a name reaching back at least as far as Pliny the Elder, who described its fiery red tongue glowing in the night. The name was later used for the tub gurnard or a related species in Liguria and Venice during the Renaissance.

== Description ==
This species reaches a maximum total length of 75.1 cm (29.6 in), the largest species in the family Triglidae, although 30 cm (12 in) is more typical. The heaviest published specimen weighed 6 kg (13 lb). The overall colour is deep reddish brown to pinkish red, with a pinkish lower body. The blue pectoral fins are spotted green in the centres and red on the margins.

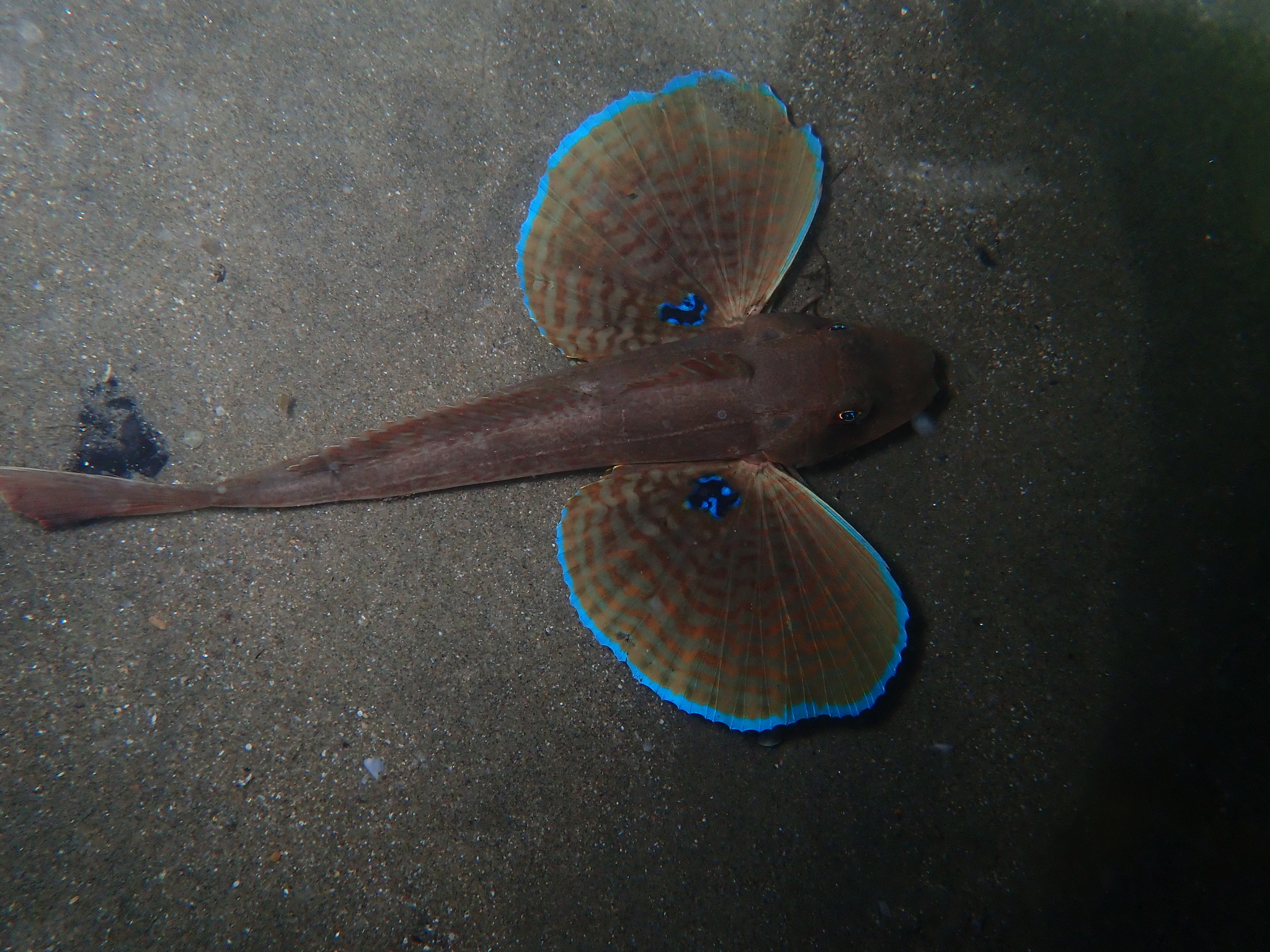
Spreading pectoral fins, France

The tub gurnard has a large, bony, triangular head which bears many ridges and spines but which does not have an occipital groove. There are two spiny lobes on the tip of the snout and the eyes are relatively small. The large mouth is set low on the head and the jaws and vomer are covered by densely set rows of teeth. There are two dorsal fins. The first contains 8 to 10 spines and the second 16 or 17 soft rays. The anal fin has between 14 and 16 soft rays. The cleithral spine is short and is located over the pectoral fin and extends just to the first quarter of the pectoral fin. The lower three rays of the pectoral fins have developed into separate, finger-like processes that are packed with sensory organs with which the gurnard appears to "walk" while detecting prey in the sediment. These tentacle-like feeler appendages are located under the head. There are no scales present on the breast and front section of the belly; the body has small, well-embedded scales, while the scales on the lateral line are small and tubular. The caudal fin is slightly emarginate.

== Distribution and habitat ==
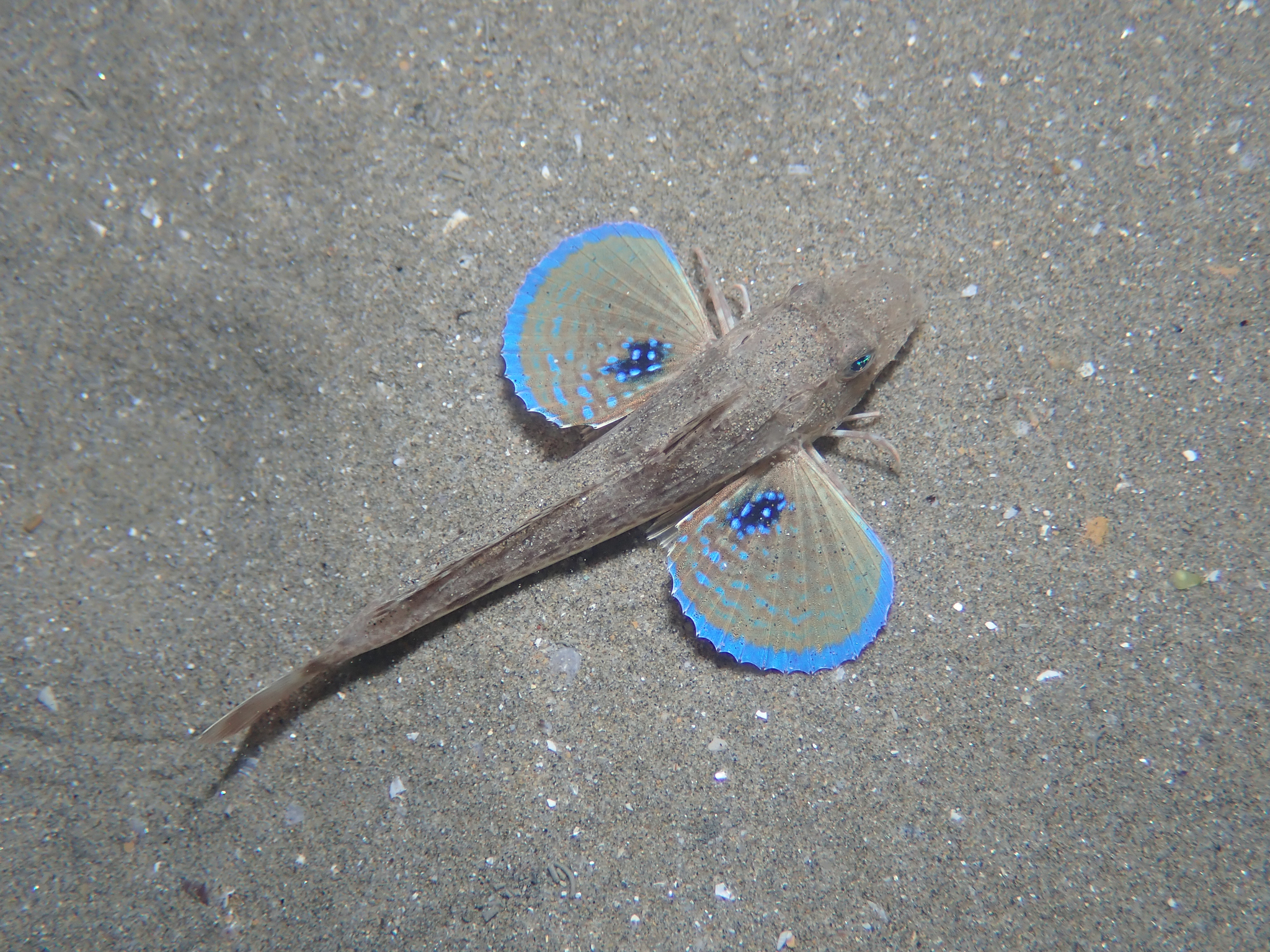
Showing eyespots, in France

The tub gurnard is found in the Eastern Atlantic Ocean where it occurs from Norway south along the European and African coasts as far south as Ghana. It occurs throughout the Mediterranean Sea and in the Black Sea as well. It is also found in the Sea of Marmara and in the coastal waters of the British Isles. It is absent from Madeira and the Azores but is found around the Canary Islands. Its distribution is thought to be shifting northwards as its abundance is increasing in the central North Sea.

This species is found on sand, mud-sand or gravel substrates at depths between 20 and 300 m (66 and 984 ft). It can also be found in the lower layers of sediment at the bottom of lakes, oceans and streams. The tub gurnard tends to go through migratory movements within its depth range during the year, occupying shallower depths in the spring and summer and moving to deeper waters in the winter. After completing an experiment based on the gurnard's dependency, subjects found that it migrates between habitats of different salinity throughout its life cycle. This shows its ability to adapt to different environments and explains why the distribution of the tub gurnard is very large. During the summer the tub gurnard may spend more time closer to the surface in water as shallow as 10 m (33 ft) and the juveniles can be found in brackish water in lagoons, estuaries and even the lower reaches of rivers. Juveniles are also more concentrated in shallow waters, where food is relatively abundant. Spatial separation between adults and juveniles has also been observed in tub gurnards, with this species being the most pronounced in distance, as adults were more dispersed towards offshore sites.

The parasitic roundworm Hysterothylacium aduncum, found in the tub gurnard's stomach, is typical for fish from the southeastern Baltic Sea. Benthic fish are known to serve as second intermediate hosts.

== Biology ==
=== Diet ===
The tub gurnard is an opportunistic predatory species which feeds on benthic prey, particularly crustaceans and smaller fishes. According to a study in the northwestern Mediterranean, the largest part of their diet was crustaceans, mostly Decapoda and especially crabs, including species such as Goneplax rhomboides and Liocarcinus spp. and caridean shrimps in the genus Philocheras, while the fish observed in the study were dominated by European anchovy (Engraulis encrasicolus) and black goby (Gobius niger). Crustaceans were a more important part of the diet in the summer and fishes gained importance during the winter. Tub gurnards are also known to prey on molluscs and polychaetes. Small teleosts which are ray-finned fish may be preyed upon by the tub gurnard. According to Colloca (1999), tub gurnards change their diet with size. Juveniles target mysids, mainly Lophogaster typicus, which tends to burrow around the adolescents during daylight. As the fish continues to grow it depends less on mysids as prey and more on fish and cephalopods. According to a study done on the trophic relationships of C. lucerna, burrowing species such as Alpheus glabe, Goneplax rhomboi and Lesueurigobius fries have also been found as the main prey of this fish.

At an intraspecific level, data suggests resource partitioning between juveniles and adults that change from preying on crustaceans to a piscivorous diet. Such behavior probably depends on the predator changing its energy requirements in relation to fish size and dietary protein levels influencing the size of the fish at first maturity. It is believed that this fish will flare out its brightly colored pectoral fins to put on view or to startle potential predators. Prey hiding in the substrate may be detected using the sensory organs on the long separate rays of the pectoral fins.

=== Reproduction ===
The tub gurnard spawns between May and July in the northern parts of its range, while it runs from November to February off Egypt. They have also been shown to spawn from May until September ranging from 100,000 to 300,000 pelagic eggs off the Georgian coasts of the Black Sea. Having pelagic eggs allows the females to have their young in wide, open spaces and closer to the shore. The eggs are described as being round, smooth and not sticky. The species is dioecious, meaning that each individual either has female or male reproductive parts, along with performing external fertilization. The male and female form a distinct pair to spawn. The eggs are pelagic and in the larvae and post-larvae all of the pectoral fin rays are contained within the fin membrane. These fishes start to reach sexual maturity at a total length of 13 cm (5.1 in) and all fish greater than 20 cm (7.9 in) in length are mature.

==== Egg development ====
A study of the embryonic and larval development of the tub gurnard by the Institute of Oceanography and Fisheries found that eggs recently laid ranged in diameter from 1.33 to 1.40 mm, with an average temperature of 13.5 degrees Celsius within the eggs themselves. Once they hatched into their larval form, the mouth was observed to be undeveloped, but the simple gut was visible. Numerous chromatophores extended continuously in small patches along dorsal and ventral margins of the primordial fin. Immediately after hatching, eyes were unpigmented but developed two days after. By day five the mouth was open and functional and on day seven the larvae were mobile and able to swim up to the surface, ranging in total length from 4.72 to 4.97 mm. The most reliable factor in identifying the differences between eggs of the tub gurnard and those of other gurnards is egg diameter, since other factors morphologically at this early stage were still very similar. The duration of the egg and larval stages depends on the temperature of their environment, where differences can alter the time that their characteristics are visible.

==== Growth and age ====
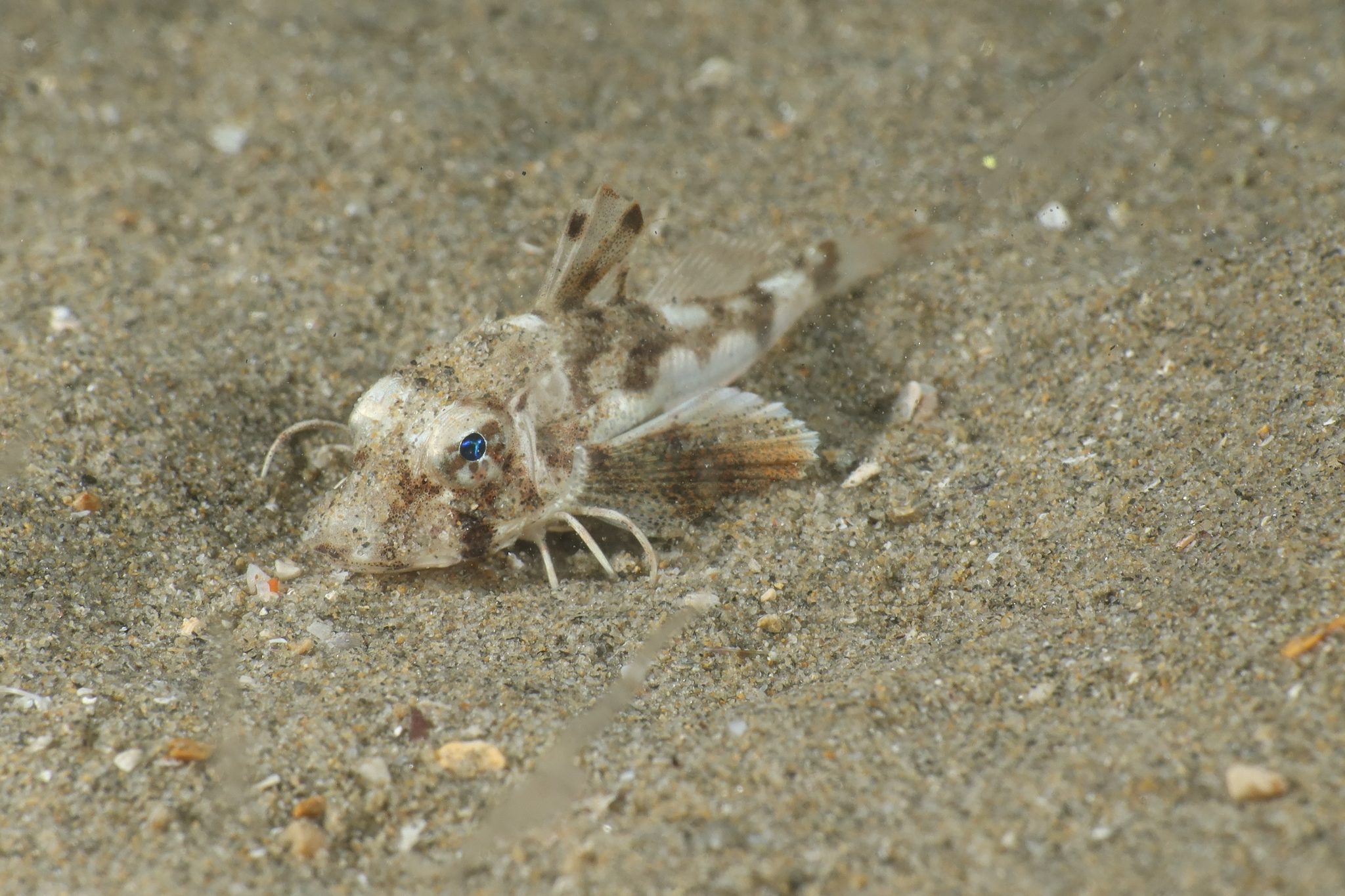
Young juvenile, France

Females have a slower growth rate and greater maximum length/age than males. The male C. lucerna reaching a maximum adult size of 75% during the first year of life compared to the female having a 48% adult size during the same time, which leaves the females to have more time to grow larger. The big difference in size is attributed to the fact that body size is less important for males in terms of fitness, leaving them to be much smaller during maturity. Another explanation for this leaves us to see a common trend in other triglid species, particularly those with significant sexual morphometric differences. Because the females are a larger size at maturity than the males, they have several advantages including larger production of eggs with higher survival rates, higher fecundity and better access to the best spawning sites. Differences in size can also be a factor that is affected by temperature and aquacultural methods.

Overall the maximum age reported for a tub gurnard was at 15 years.

=== Vocalizations ===
Tub gurnards make grunting or growling sounds, using the muscles associated with the swim bladder, these sounds are thought to be used to keep the schools together. Their name comes from the old French word 'gornard' meaning 'grunter' or to 'grunt'. Recent studies have shown that these 'grunts' vary greatly and are used for communication.

== Fisheries ==
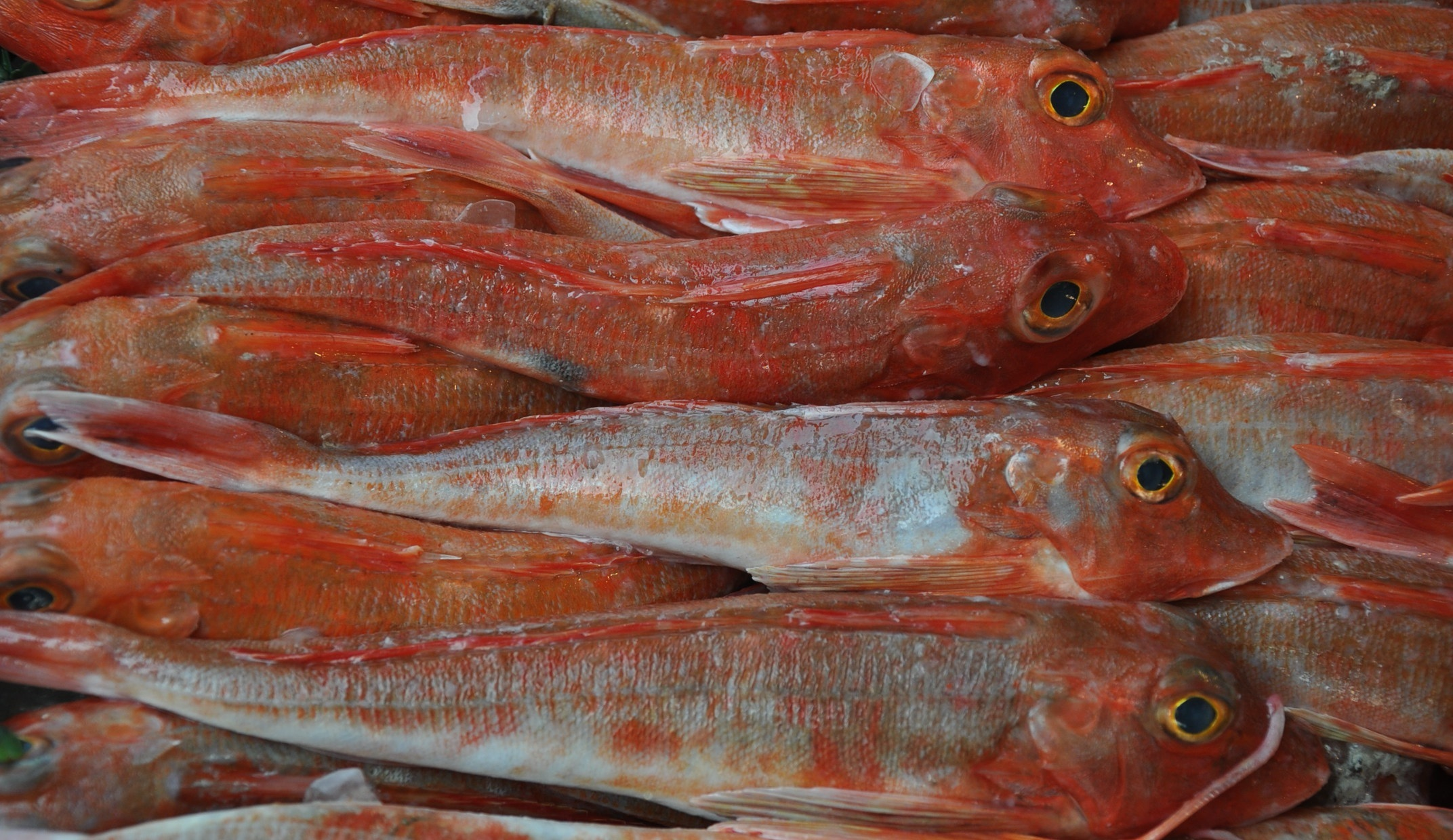
At a fish market

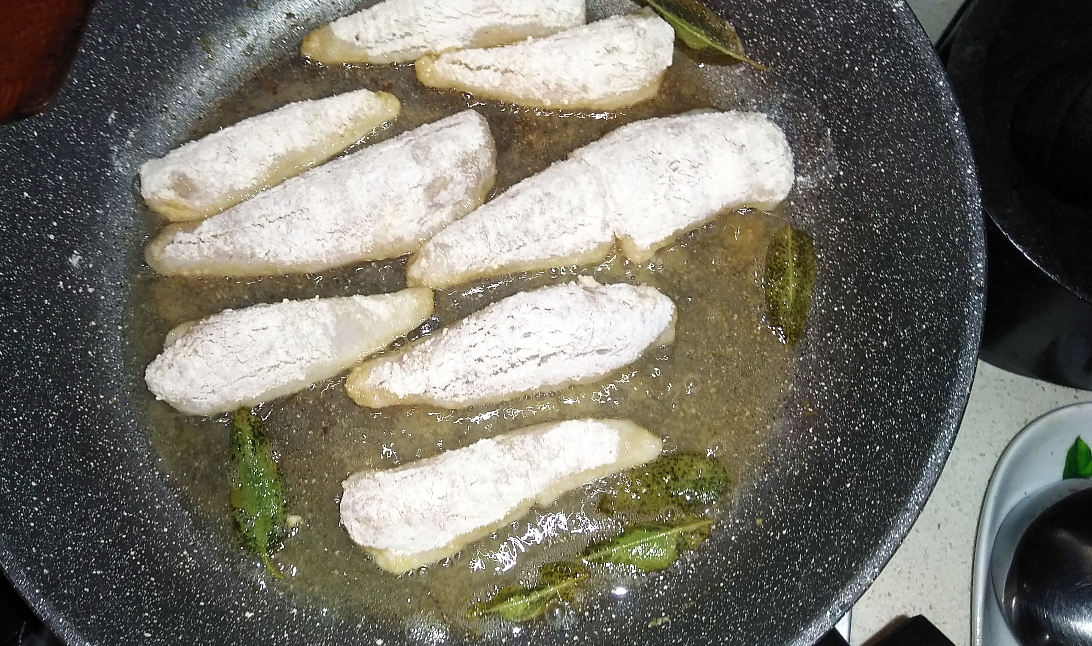
Fried in butter and sage

The tub gurnard is targeted by commercial fisheries but the amount caught is relatively low, average declared global landings in 2011 to 2015 were 4429 tonnes. Much of this catch is taken in the North Sea (52%) and the eastern English Channel (37%), however, the actual landings are often described as "gurnard" and are not sorted to species on landing. The tub gurnard, with the red gurnard ( Chelidonichthys cuculus) and the grey gurnard (Eutrigla gurnardus) have been recognised as potential commercial species and this has led to recommendations made by the ICES to monitor landings and discards and to get population biology data to be used to assess the stock. However, this data is lacking in all three exploited gurnard species, particularly the tub gurnard. Chelidonichthys lucerna is an abundant coastal species distributed along the Mediterranean and Black Seas, and the eastern Atlantic coast. Tends to be caught as a discard in the Mediterranean as its usually thrown back into the sea or directly brought to port and marketed, at a very low price, for the preparation of soups. A study done on the quality of the gurnards meat states that it possess proximate and fatty acid compositions that both exhibit variations during seasons. Although its rarely commercialized in fillets, its flesh has high nutritional value and could be used to produce restructured products in a process that would result in the generation of various by-products, such as skins. Tub gurnards are also commercially important in European waters. In France, they constitute the most important fishery in the western English Channel (ICES Division VIIe), where the market is well established (ICES 2006); in the North Sea, the grey gurnard, Eutrigla gurnardus (Linnaeus, 1758), is used for human consumption.

=== Conservation ===
In the Portuguese fish markets the C.lucerna is the Triglidae species that has the largest size and greatest commercial interest. It is sold under a commercial category ("Ruivos") that also comprises other gurnard species. To develop an estimate of the amount of tub gurnards in the Portuguese coast, their migratory movements were considered by which this study tested their dependency. Resulting in the findings that this species due to migrating between different salinities in their environment was able to show their high ability to adapt. Overall, the information provided by this study is essential to improving the conservation of C. lucerna, the most important commercial species in the Triglidae family in Portugal. It confirmed the fundamental role of estuarine habitats as nursery areas, feeding grounds, and reliability of the Sr:Ca ratio as a tracer to investigate the migration patterns of teleost species between habitats with different salinities.

== Gallery ==
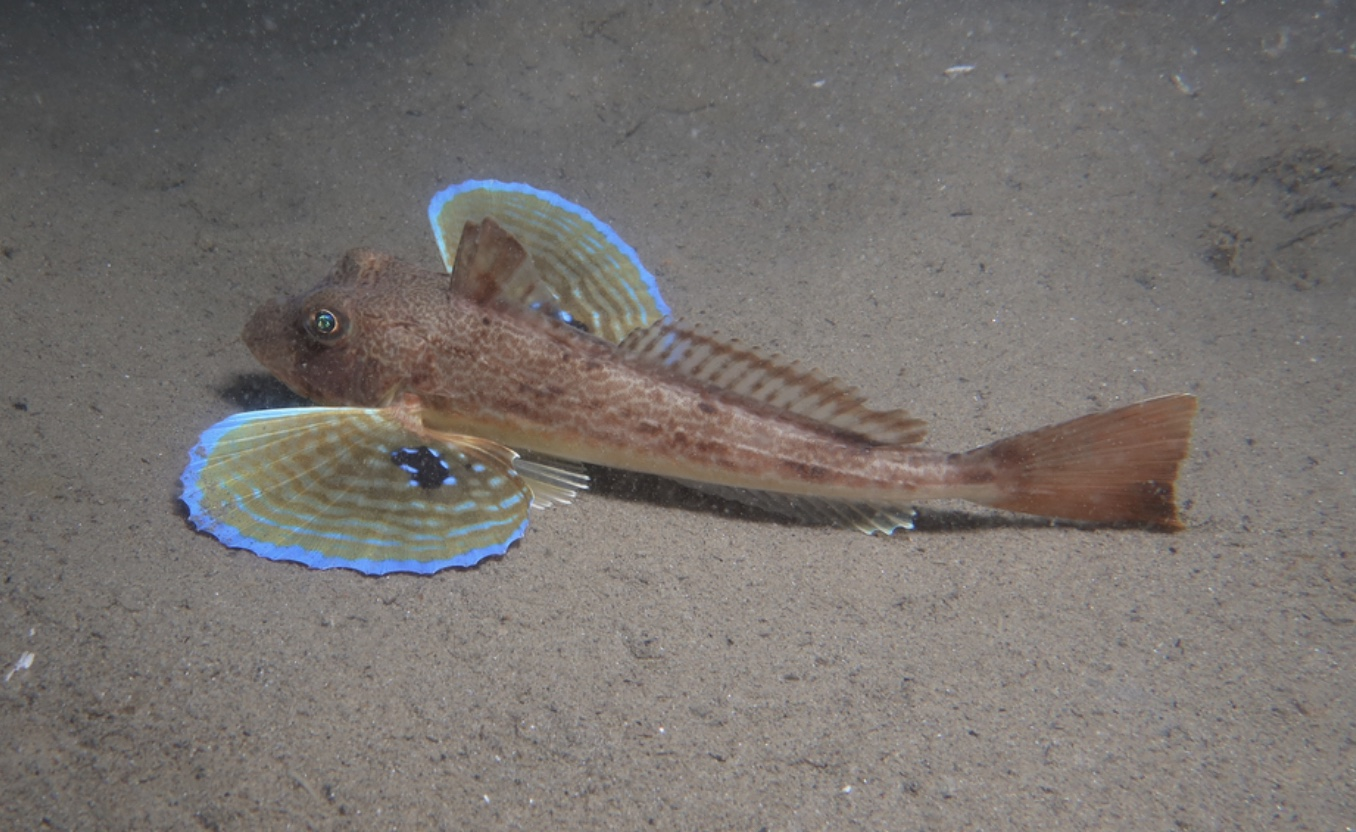
Tub gurnard walking across the ocean floor

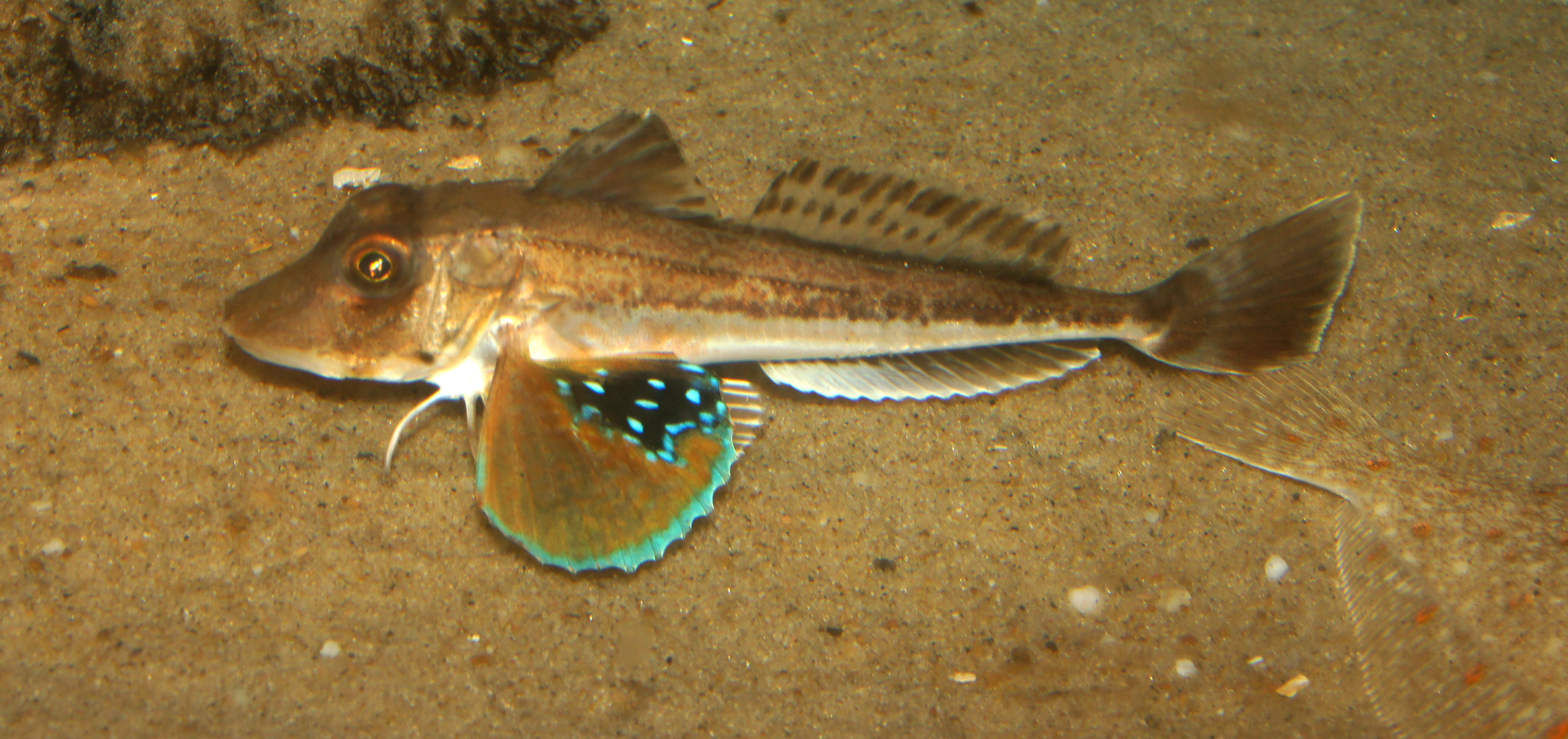
Swimming
