= Gabon gurnard =

Conservation status
- Least Concern (IUCN 3.1)

Scientific classification
- Kingdom: Animalia
- Phylum: Chordata
- Class: Actinopterygii
- Order: Perciformes
- Family: Triglidae
- Genus: Chelidonichthys
- Subgenus: Chelidonichthys
- Species: C. gabonensis

Binomial name
- Chelidonichthys gabonensis (Poll & Roux, 1955)

Synonyms
- Trigla gabonensis Poll & Roux, 1955; Chelidonichthys senegalensis Puyo, 1957

Species of fish

The Gabon gurnard (Chelidonichthys gabonensis) is a species of marine ray-finned fishes belonging to the family Triglidae, the gurnards and sea robins. This species is found in the East Central and Western Atlantic Ocean where they occur at depths of from 15–200 metres (49–656 ft) and also in Cape Verde and the Gulf of Guinea. The species maximum length is 32 centimetres (13 in) TL, but can be as small as 20 centimetres (7.9 in). This species is of commercial importance as a food fish.
