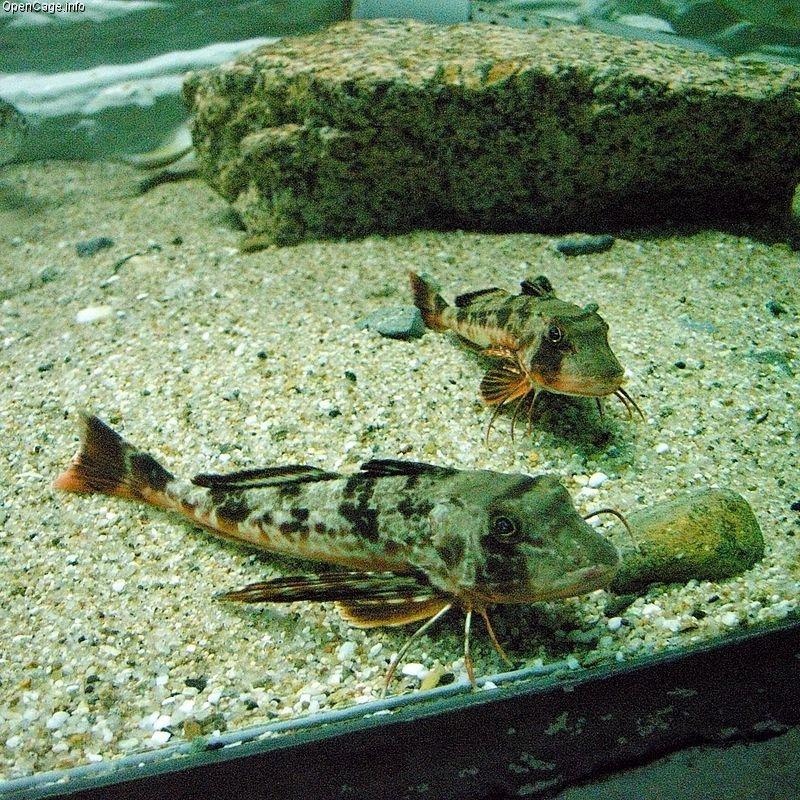
- Spiny red gurnard, (C. spinosus)

Scientific classification
- Kingdom: Animalia
- Phylum: Chordata
- Class: Actinopterygii
- Division: Teleostei
- Order: Perciformes
- Family: Triglidae
- Subfamily: Triglinae
- Genus: Chelidonichthys; Kaup, 1873

Type species
- Trigla hirundo Linnaeus, 1758

Species
- see text

Synonyms
- Aspitrigla Fowler, 1925; Currupiscis Whitley, 1931; Trigloporus J. L. B. Smith, 1934

= Chelidonichthys =

Smallscaled gurnards Temporal range: Late Miocene to present

Genus of fishes

Chelidonichthys, the smallscaled gurnards, is a genus of marine ray-finned fishes belonging to the family Triglidae, the gurnards and sea robins. These gurnards are found in the Eastern Atlantic, Indian and Western Pacific Oceans.

== Taxonomy ==
Chelidonichthys was first formally described as a genus in 1873 by the German zoologist Johann Jakob Kaup. In 1896 Trigla hirundo was designated as the type species of the genus by David Starr Jordan and Barton Warren Evermann, T. hirundo is now treated as a junior synonym of Trigla lucerna which had been described by Linnaeus in 1758 from the "Northern Ocean". The genus is classified into three subgenera by some authorities, Cheilonichthys, Aspitrigla and Trigloporus. The genus name combines chelidon, meaning "swallow", with ichthys, meaning "fish", probably an allusion to the specific name of the type species, hirundo, which also means "swallow".

== Species ==
There are currently three subgenera and eleven recognized species in this genus:

- subgenus Chelidonichthys Kaup, 1876
  - Chelidonichthys capensis (G. Cuvier, 1829) (Cape gurnard)
  - Chelidonichthys gabonensis (Poll & C. Roux, 1955) (Gabon gurnard)
  - Chelidonichthys ischyrus D. S. Jordan & W. F. Thompson, 1914
  - Chelidonichthys kumu (G. Cuvier, 1829) (Bluefin gurnard)
  - Chelidonichthys lucerna (Linnaeus, 1758) (Tub gurnard)
  - Chelidonichthys queketti (Regan, 1904) (Lesser gurnard)
  - Chelidonichthys spinosus (McClelland, 1844) (Spiny red gurnard)
- subgenus Aspitrigla Fowler, 1925
  - Chelidonichthys cuculus (Linnaeus, 1758) (Red gurnard)
  - Chelidonichthys obscurus (Walbaum, 1792) (Longfin gurnard)
- subgenus Trigloporus J. L. B. Smith, 1934
  - Chelidonichthys africanus (J. L. B. Smith, 1934)
  - Chelidonichthys lastoviza (Bonnaterre, 1788) (Streaked gurnard)

In addition, the fossil species †Chelidonichthys macroptera (Arambourg, 1928) is known from the latest Miocene (Messinian) of Algeria.

== Characteristics ==
Chelidonichthys gurnards have bont plates along the base of first spiny dorsal fin but not along the base of the second soft rayed dorsal fin. The scales on the body and caudal peduncle are small and there are typically 60 scale rows along the lateral line but no scales on the head. There is a deep groove on the occipital region. The largest species is the tub gurnard (C. lucerna) of the Eastern Pacific Ocean, which has a maximum published total length of 75 cm (30 in), while the smallest is C. ischyura with a maximum published total length of 15 cm (5.9 in).

== Distribution ==
Chelidonichthys gurnards are found in the eastern Atlantic Ocean, the Mediterranean Sea, the Indian Ocean and the Western Pacific Ocean.
