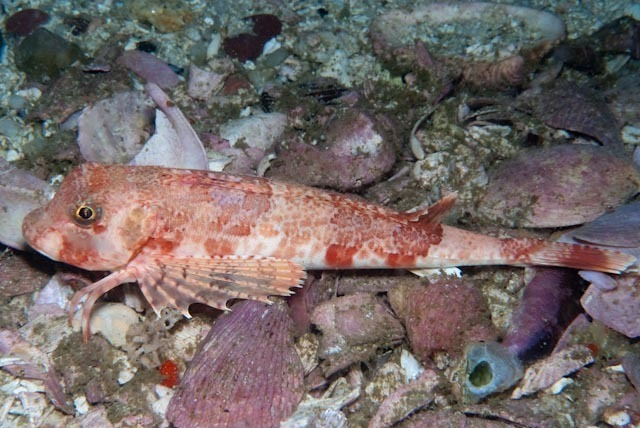
- Cape Point, South Africa
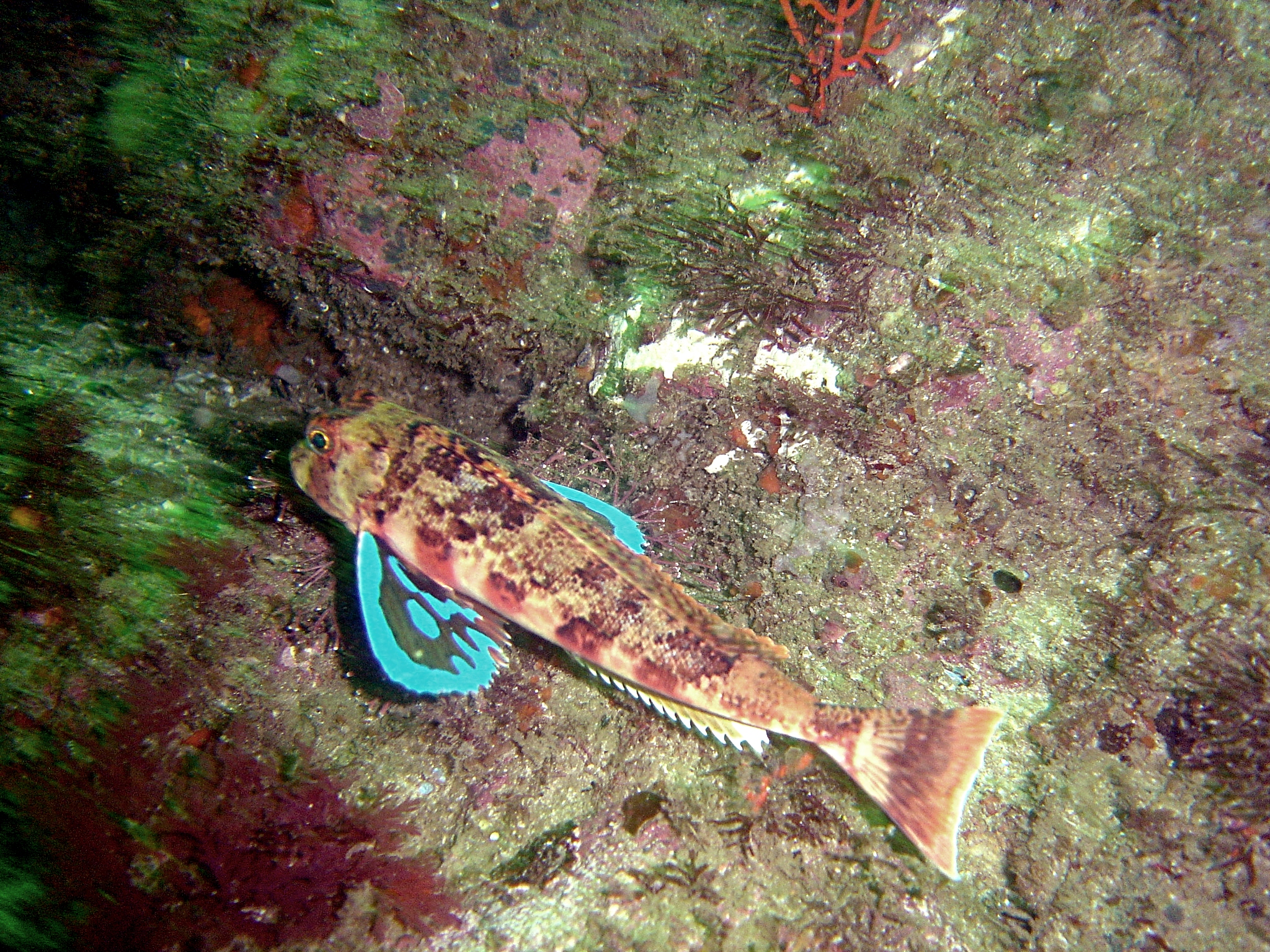
- Cape gurnard flashing its pectorals

Conservation status
- Least Concern (IUCN 3.1)

Scientific classification
- Kingdom: Animalia
- Phylum: Chordata
- Class: Actinopterygii
- Order: Perciformes
- Family: Triglidae
- Genus: Chelidonichthys
- Subgenus: Chelidonichthys
- Species: C. capensis

Binomial name
- Chelidonichthys capensis (Cuvier, 1829)

Synonyms
- Trigla capensis Cuvier, 1829

= Cape gurnard =

Species of fish

The Cape gurnard (Chelidonichthys capensis) is a species of marine ray-finned fishes belonging to the family Triglidae, the gurnards and sea robins. This species is found in the southeastern Atlantic Ocean and the southwestern Indian Ocean. This species is of commercial importance as a food fish.

== Taxonomy ==
The Cape gurnard was first formally described in 1829 as Trigla capensis by the French zoologist Georges Cuvier with the type locality given as the Cape of Good Hope in South Africa. Within the genus Chelidonichthys this species is classified in the nominate subgenus. The specific name capensis refers to the type locality.

== Description ==
The Cape gurnard has two dorsal fins, the first contains 8 or 9 spines and the second has between 15 and 17 soft rays. The anal fin has between 14 and 16 soft rays. The overall colour and pattern is mottled, red and brown. The pectoral fins have the 3 innermost rays separate and forming a "claw" which it uses to perch on the substrate, the rest of the pectoral fin rays are long and fan like with the inner part of the fin being dark with a vivid blue edge and marked with 3 or 4 large blue spots. The head is comparatively high and the eyes are on the top of the head. The more pointed snout identifies this species in comparison to the sympatric streaked gurnard (C. lastoviza). This species attains a maximum published total length of 75 cm (30 in), although 35 cm (14 in) is more typical.

== Distribution and habitat ==
The Cape gurnard is found in the southeastern Atlantic Ocean and southwestern Indian Ocean ranging from Cape Fria in Namibia to Maputo in Mozambique, as well as off southern Madagascar. It occurs at depths between 10 and 390 m (33 and 1,280 ft). This demersal fish is found on sandy and muddy substrates.

== Biology ==
The Cape gurnard feeds largely on crustaceans, cephalopods and smaller fishes. This species has a long spawning season running from November to January and again in March and April, the eggs are pelagic. Spawning is at its peak in January and April. The males attain sexual maturity at 37 cm (15 in) total length at the age of 5 years, and for the females it is at a total length of 35 cm (14 in) at an age of 4 years old. The maximum lifespan for the Cape gurnard is 16 years.

== Fisheries ==
The Cape gurnard is one of the six main target species for trawl fisheries in the Eastern Cape and is a valued food fish.
