= Chelidonichthys ischyrus =

Scientific classification
- Kingdom: Animalia
- Phylum: Chordata
- Class: Actinopterygii
- Order: Perciformes
- Family: Triglidae
- Genus: Chelidonichthys
- Subgenus: Chelidonichthys
- Species: C. ischyrus

Binomial name
- Chelidonichthys ischyrus Jordan & Thompson, 1914

Species of fish

Chelidonichthys ischyrus, is a species of marine ray-finned fishes belonging to the family Triglidae, the gurnards and sea robins. This species is endemic to Sagami Bay, Japan. The species is 15 centimetres (5.9 in) TL. This species is of commercial importance as a food fish.
