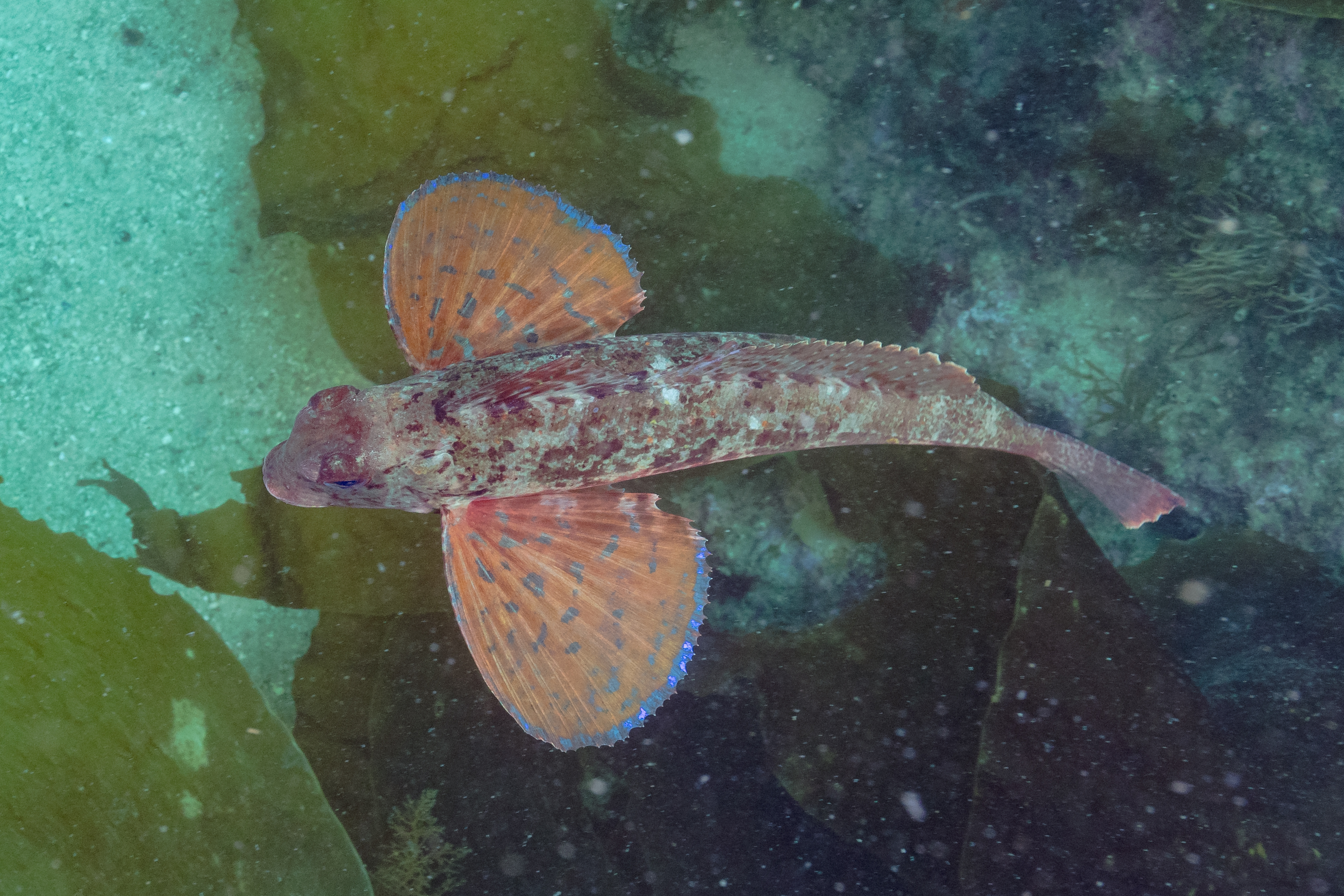

Scientific classification
- Kingdom: Animalia
- Phylum: Chordata
- Class: Actinopterygii
- Division: Teleostei
- Order: Perciformes
- Family: Triglidae
- Genus: Chelidonichthys
- Species: C. spinosus

Binomial name
- Chelidonichthys spinosus (McClelland, 1844)

Synonyms
- Trigla spinosus McClelland, 1844

= Spiny red gurnard =

Species of fish

The spiny red gurnard (Chelidonichthys spinosus) is a species of marine ray-finned fish belonging to the family Triglidae, the gurnards and sea robins. This species is found in the northwestern Pacific Ocean at depths ranging from 25 to 615 metres (82 to 2,018 ft). This species grows to a length of 40 centimetres (16 in) TL. This species is of commercial importance as a food fish.

== Taxonomy ==
The spiny red gurnard was first formally described as Trigla spinosus in 1844 by the British medical doctor and naturalist John McClelland with the type locality given as "China". Within the genus Chelidonichthys this species is classified in the nominate subgenus. The specific name spinosus means "spiny" and alludes to the spine on either side of the nape, the large spine on the humeral bone above the pectoral fins, a small spine on the operculum, and the pair of spines on the lower corner of the preoperculum.

== Description ==
The spiny red gurnard has a large triangular shaped head which bears a number of ridges and spines, although it does not have an occipital groove. The diameter of the eyes exceeds the distance between them. Both the soft-rayed dorsal fin and the anal fin contain between 15 and 17 soft rays and the base of both the dorsal fins have small, robustly spined plates, known as bucklers, which result in ossification of the pteridygiophores. There are small scales on the body but the breast lacks scales. The overall colour is olive or brownish, changing to red under stress. The lower part of the pectoral fins has a large number of bluish spots scattered over it. There is some times a black blotch on the inner pectoral fin. This species has attained a maximum published total length of 40 cm (16 in) and a maximum published weight of 950 g (34 oz).

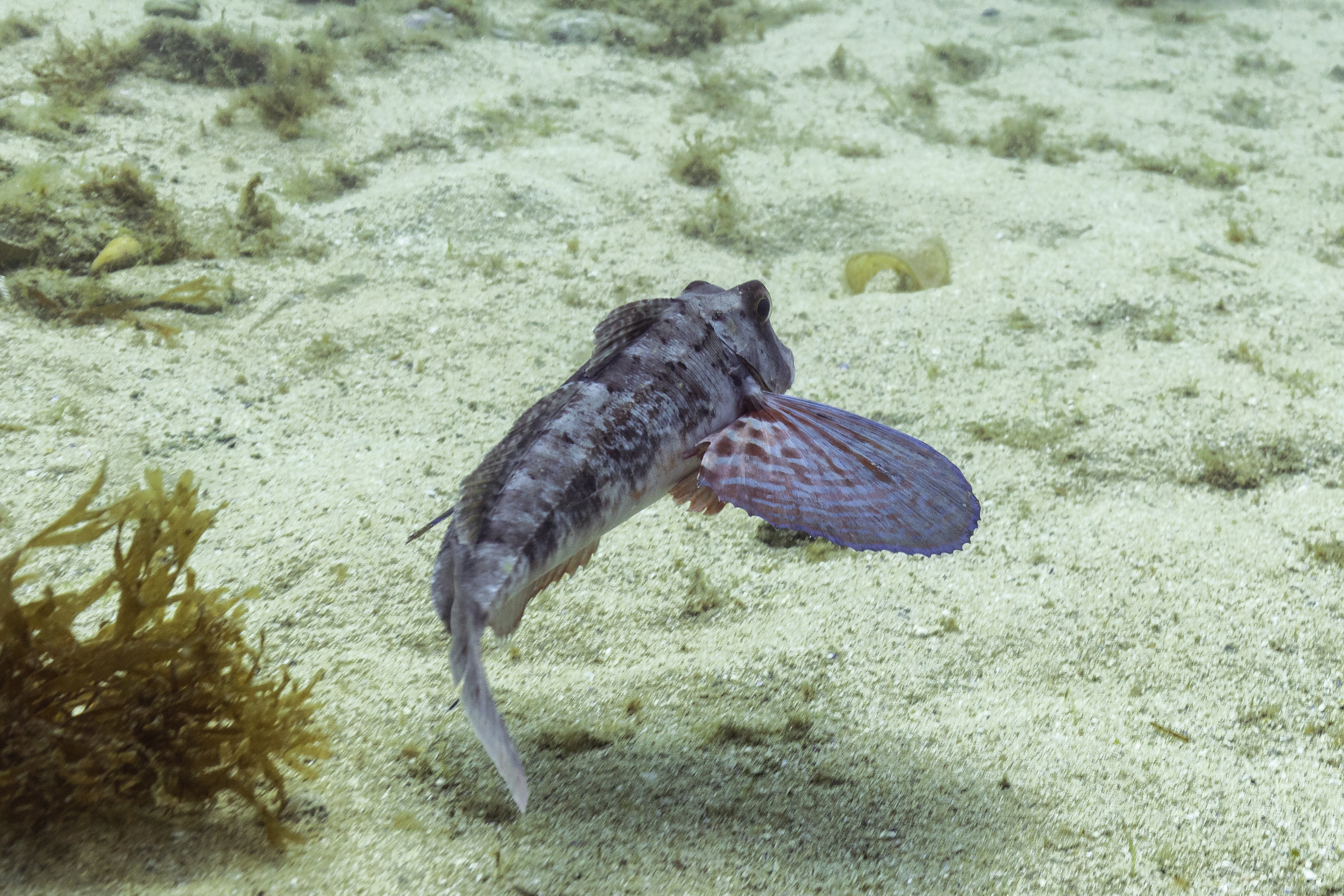
Spiny red gurnard with its characteristic super-enlarged pectoral fins.

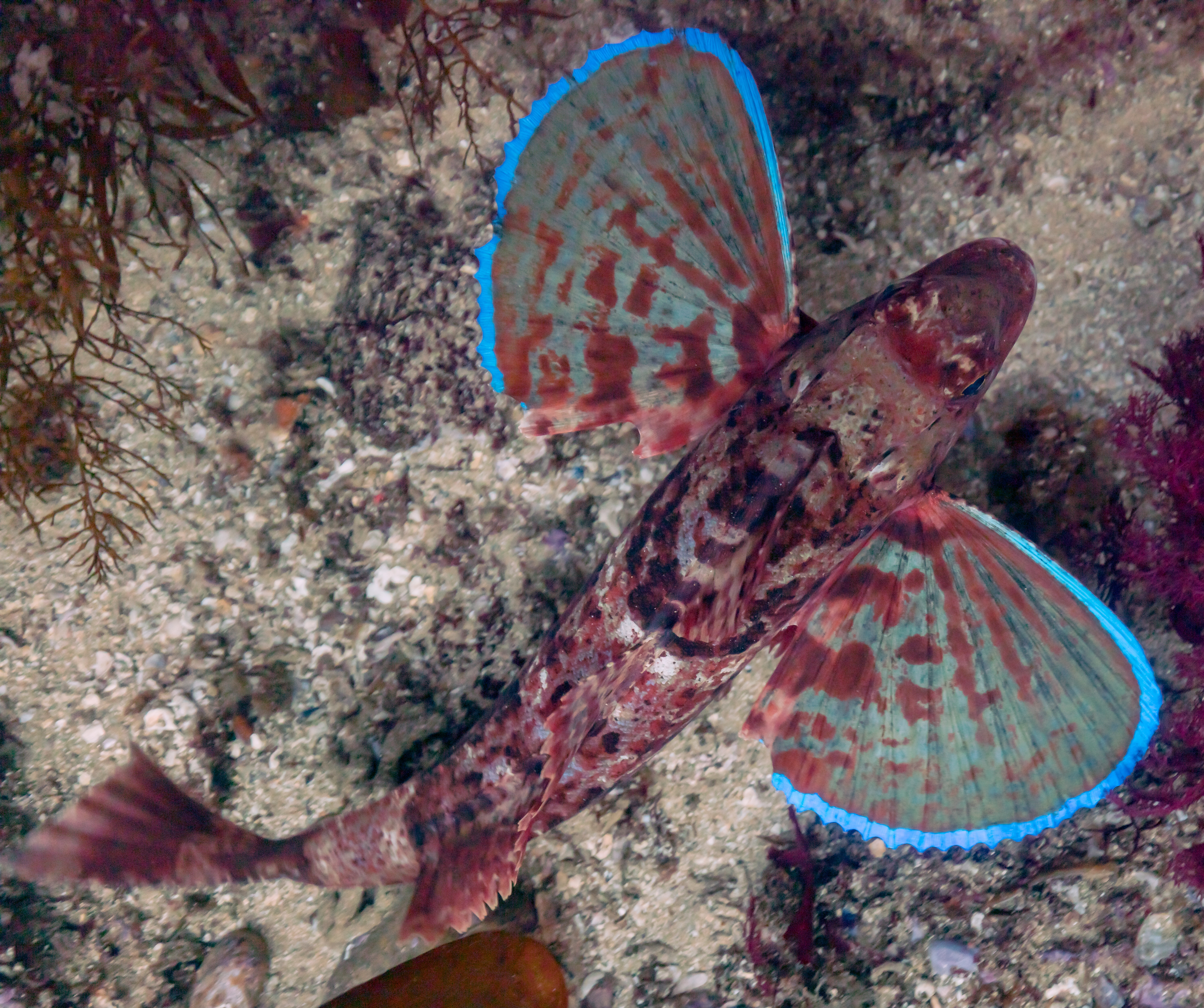
Top view

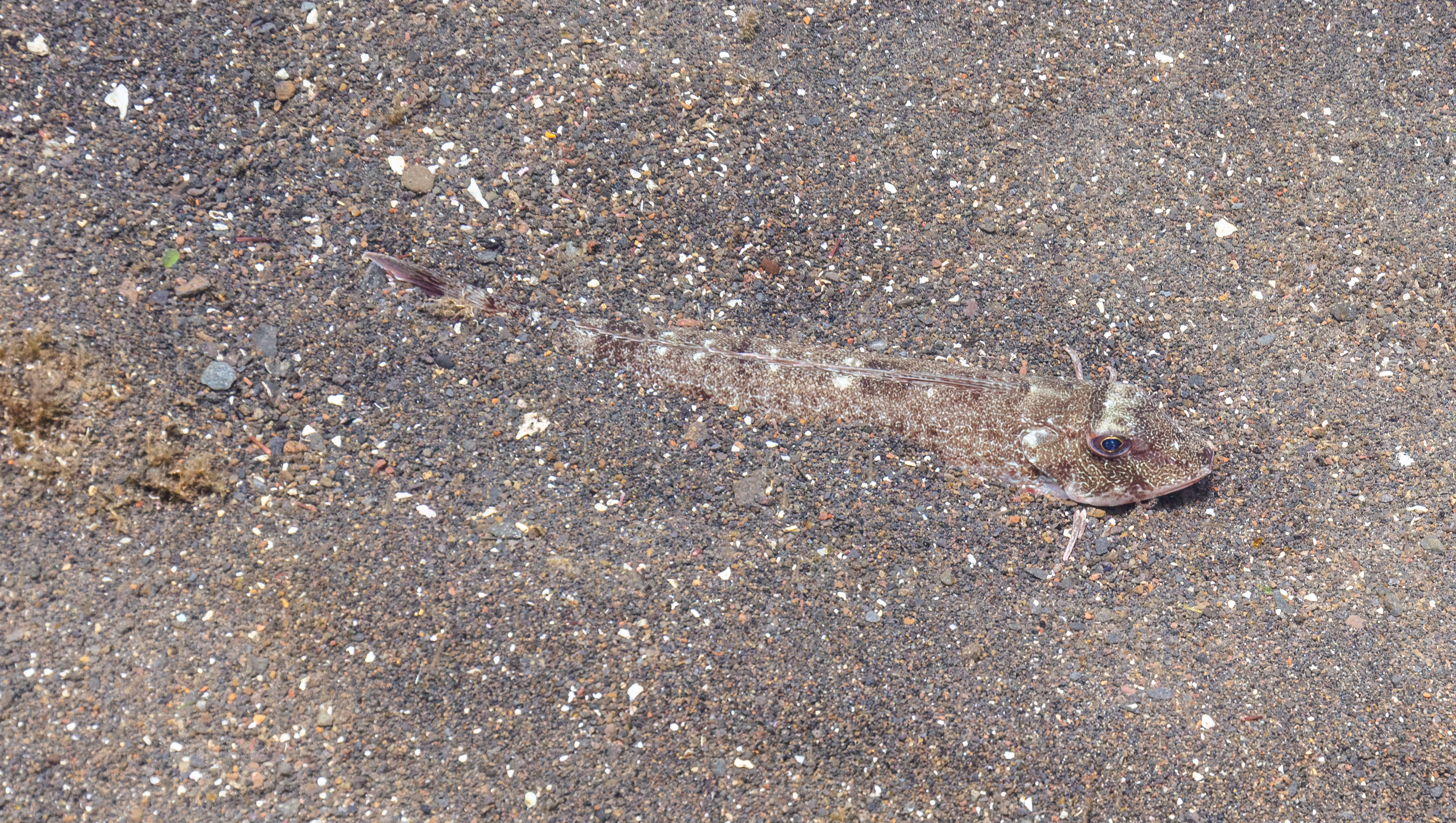
Camouflaged in gravel

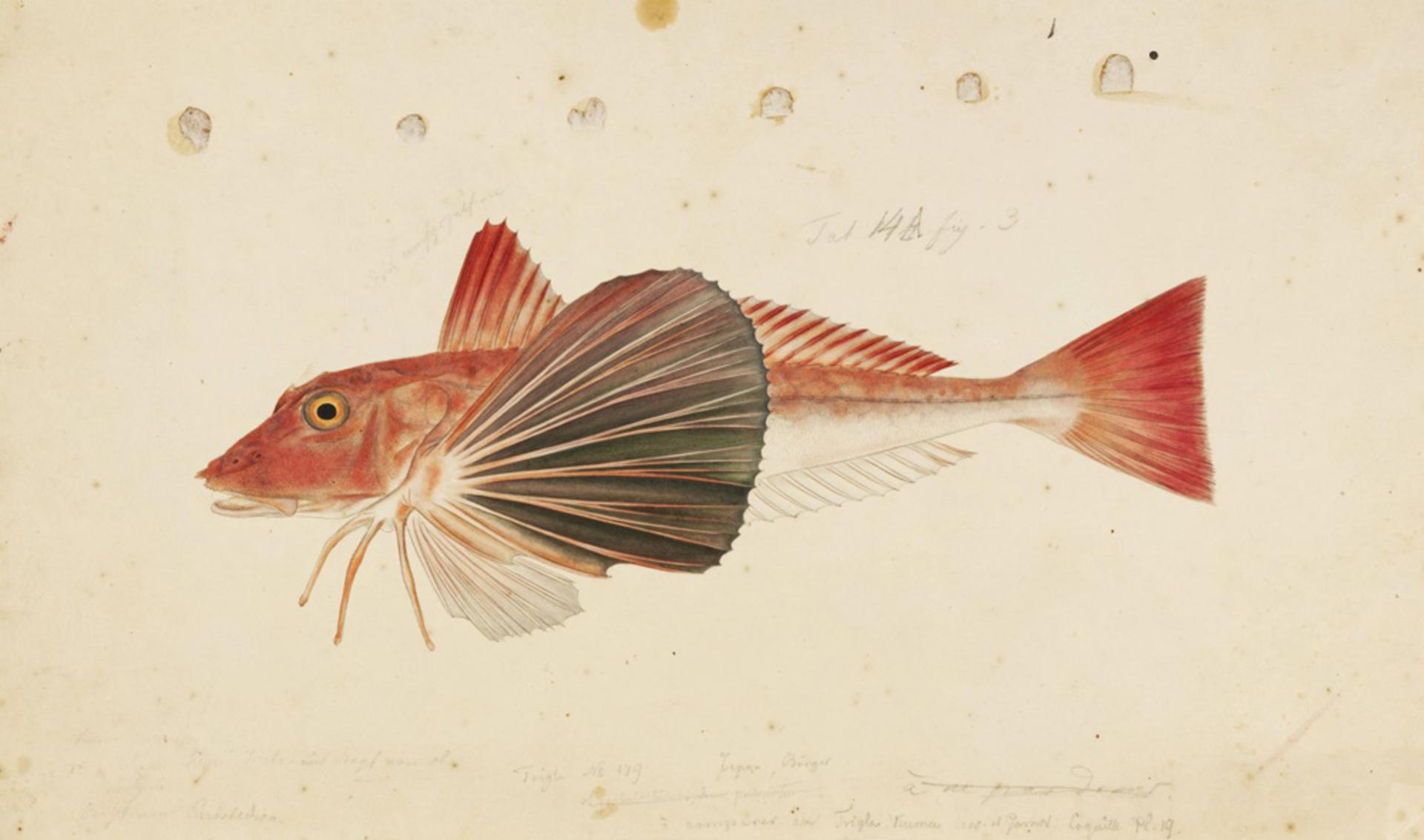
Spiny red gurnard, painted by Kawahara Keiga (1823-1829)

== Distribution and habitat ==
The spiny red gurnard is found in the northwestern Pacific Ocean in the China Sea, Yellow Sea and in Japan mainly west of Kyushu. occurs in the tropical to warm temperate areas on sandy or sandy mud substrates at depths of 25 to 630 m (82 to 2,067 ft).

== Fisheries ==
The spiny red gurnard is regarded as an excellent food fish and is fished for by trawling throughout its range.

== As food ==
The spiny red gurnard is eaten in East Asia. In Japan, it is known as hōbō.

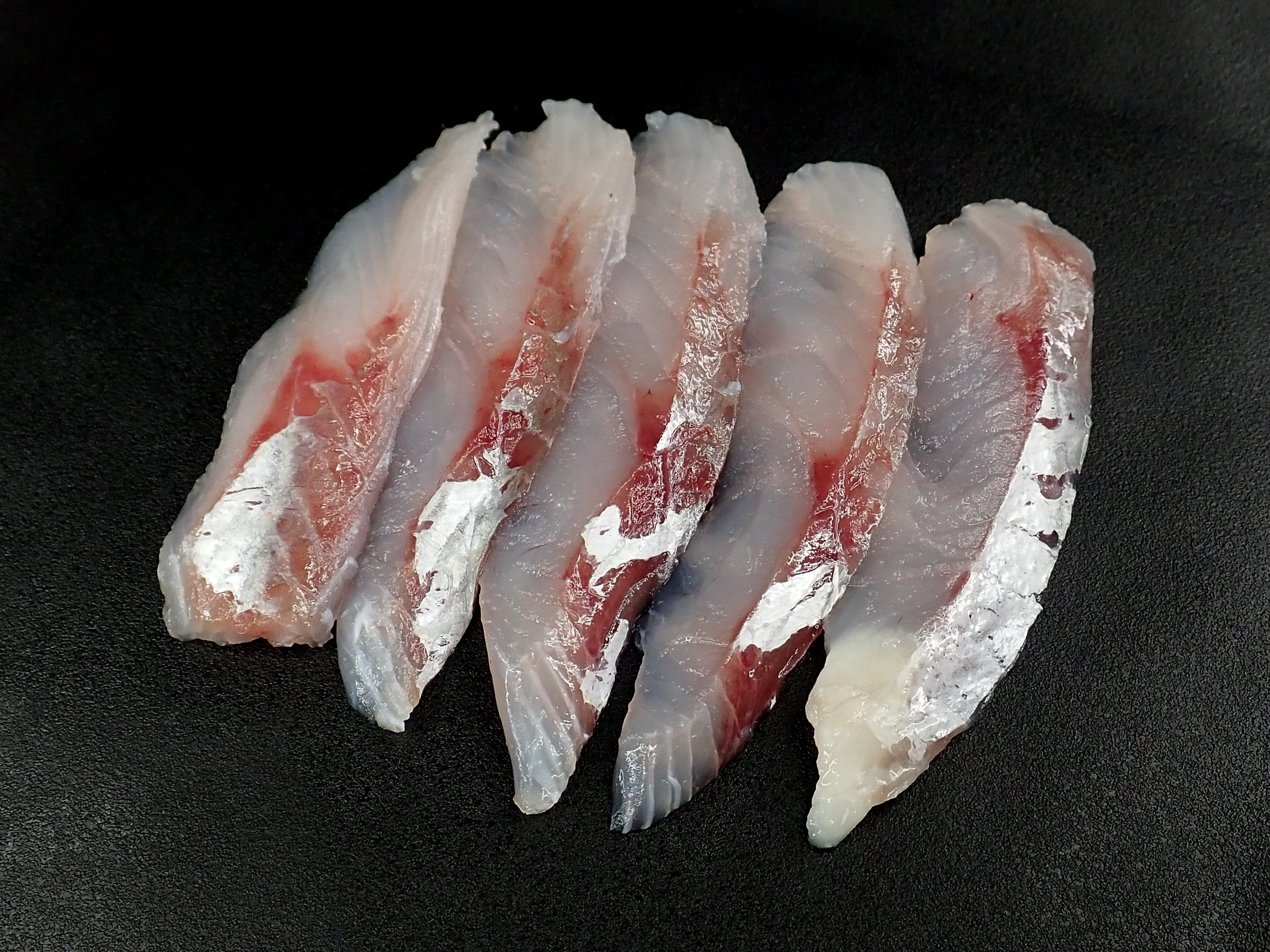
Japanese red gurnard sashimi

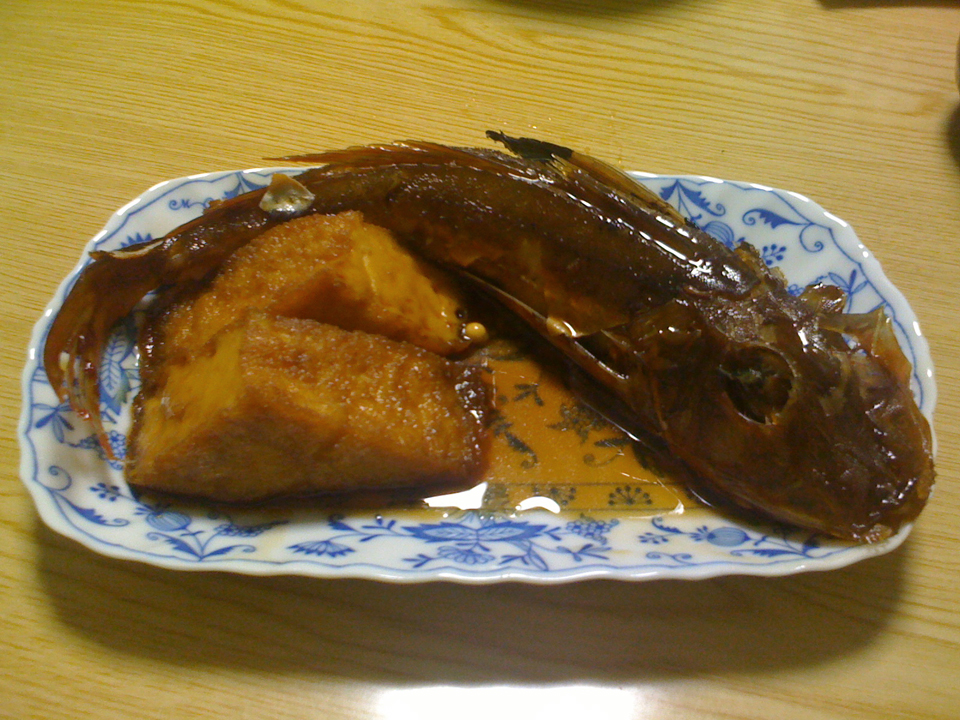
Japanese red gurnard nimono
