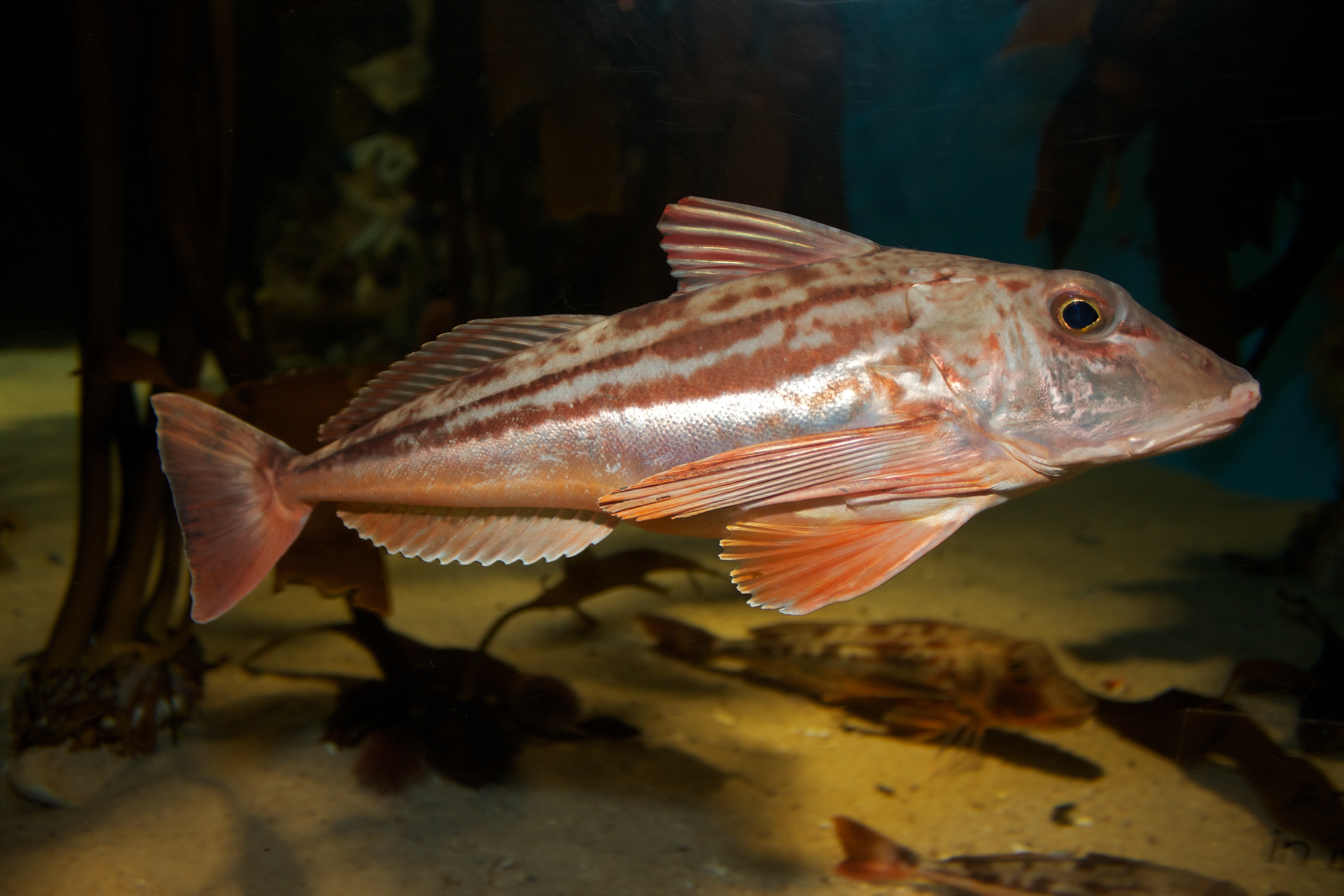

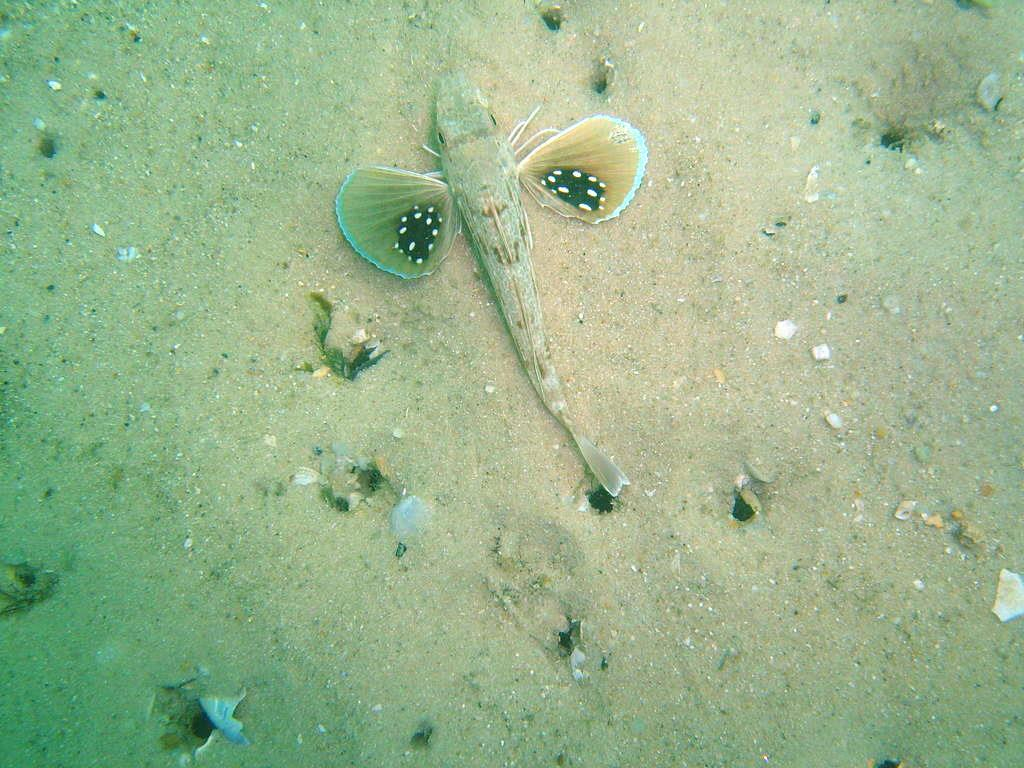

Conservation status
- Least Concern (IUCN 3.1)

Scientific classification
- Kingdom: Animalia
- Phylum: Chordata
- Class: Actinopterygii
- Order: Perciformes
- Family: Triglidae
- Genus: Chelidonichthys
- Subgenus: Chelidonichthys
- Species: C. kumu

Binomial name
- Chelidonichthys kumu (Cuvier, 1829)

Synonyms
- Trigla kumu Cuvier, 1829; Trigla peronii Cuvier, 1829

= Bluefin gurnard =

Species of fish

The bluefin gurnard or Pacific red gurnard (Chelidonichthys kumu) is a species of marine ray-finned fishes belonging to the family Triglidae, the gurnards and sea robins. Its Māori names are kumukumu and pūwahaiau. It is found in the western Indian Ocean and the western Pacific Ocean, being common around Australia and New Zealand at depths down to 200 metres (660 ft). The fish is one of the most important commercial fish species in New Zealand.

== Taxonomy ==
The bluefin gurnard was first formally described in 1829 by the French zoologist Georges Cuvier with the type locality given as New Zealand. Within the genus Chelidonichthys this species is classified in the nominate subgenus. The specific name kumu is a latinisation of koumou, a name Cuvier said was used locally for this fish New Zealand.

== Description ==
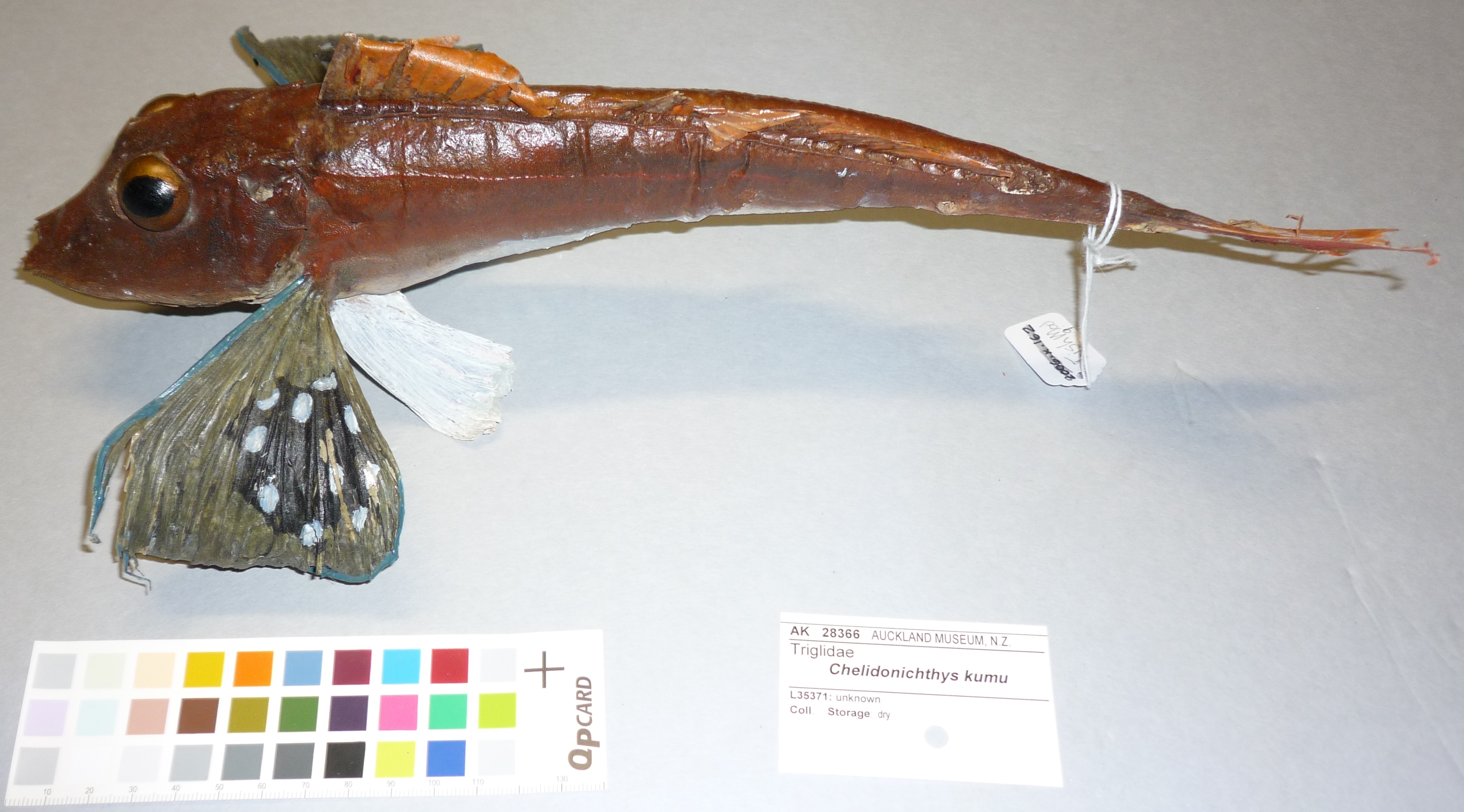
Chelidonichthys kumu (Cuvier, 1829)

The bluefin gurnard is a bottom-dwelling fish known for its bright red body and large, colourful pectoral fins with a large black eye-spot in the center and surrounded by a bright blue edge. Its natural colour is a splotchy pale brown, generally only becoming red when stressed and the belly is paler or even white.

It has a boxy, bony head which is protected by backwards-facing spines along the front of the snout and around the eye as well as on the hind margin of the operculum and tapers into a laterally elongated body with 33-35 vertebrae.

There are 8-10 gill rakers and 70-80 scales on its lateral line, which is uninterrupted. Its two tall, triangular dorsal fins have a total of 15-16 soft rays and 9-10 spines. There is no adipose fin. The anal fin has 14-16 soft rays and no spines.

The bluefin gurnard's large, fan-like pectoral fins are one of two pairs with 13-14 soft rays and its pelvic fin has 5 soft rays and a single spine. The pectoral fins' first three rays are modified and separated from the rest of the fin. They are used as sensory organs, sometimes referred to as "fingers", permitting it to probe the sea bottom to detect prey buried in the sand or the mud These spectacular fins make the red gurnard look like a butterfly of the sea, however their role is not entirely known. They could be used to attract a mate or frighten off predators. These fan-like fins can also be used to give stability during swimming.

== Distribution ==
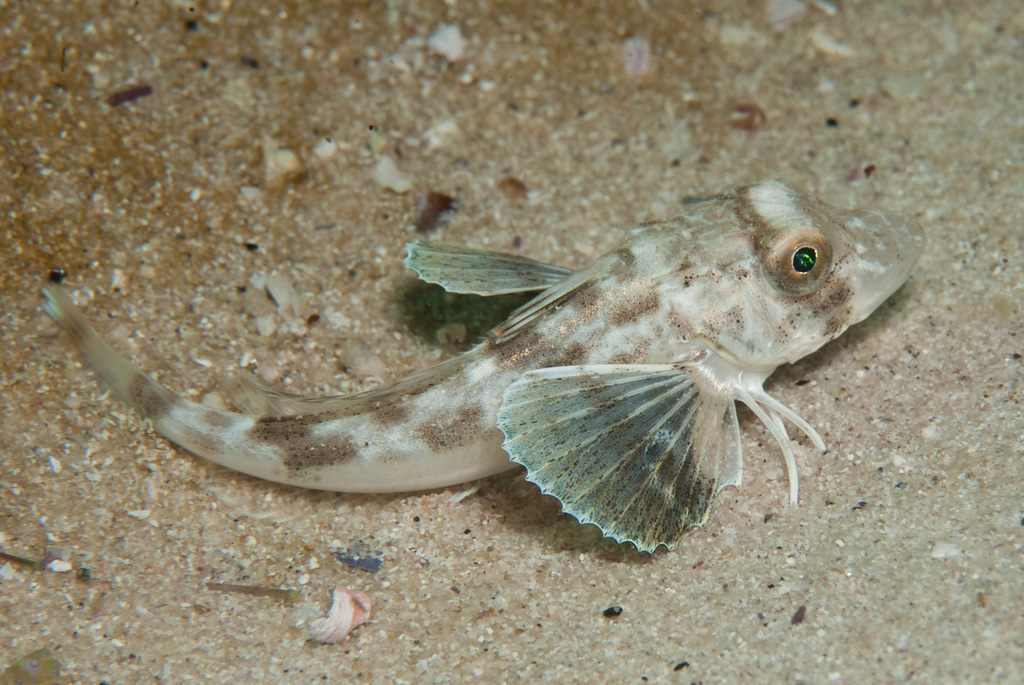
Cape Peninsula, South Africa

=== Natural global range ===
The bluefin gurnard can be found throughout many central tropical and temperate Indo-West Pacific waters. It is commonly found along the coasts of New Zealand, Australia, South Africa, and many islands in the South Pacific. It is unsure whether or not previous records from Japan, Korea, China, and the Hawaiian Islands are mis-identifications.

=== New Zealand range ===
The bluefin gurnard is the most common gurnard in New Zealand. It is found in all the coastal waters around both the North and South Islands except the southern fiords, and also Stewart, the Chatham, and Kermadec Islands. There are large population hotspots around the Bay of Plenty, Hawke Bay, Banks Peninsula, Foveaux Strait, the west coast of the North Island, and the north and northwest coasts of the South Island.

=== Habitat preferences ===
As a benthic marine fish, the bluefin gurnard prefers shallow coastal waters and may be found from the edge of continental shelves to estuaries and brackish rivers) with soft bottoms of sand, sandy-shell, or mud. This is because they 'walk' slowly over the seabed using their first three free-rays. They can bury themselves in the substrate, with only the top of their head, their nostrils and eyes exposed in order to surprise prey (Lang, 2000). It is found from shallow waters one meter deep but generally inhabits 100-200m but may have maximum depths of up to 300m.

== Life cycle/Phenology ==
=== Growth ===
Bluefin gurnard eggs develop for 7 days before hatching, and grow rapidly until they reach maturity at 2–3 years old. After reaching maturity growth slows considerably and they move into deeper water where bluefin gurnards found in deeper strata were older and longer on average than those found inshore.

Males are smaller than females at around 26 cm and 33 cm respectively and they may live for over 12 years.

=== Spawning ===
In New Zealand spawning occurs around multiple places throughout both the North and South Islands along shallow and mid-shelf coastal waters. Spawning time ranges all the way from spring to autumn – September to May – and ovulating females have been reported all year round, but peak spawning time is in late spring and early summer – November and December. The end of the spawning season coincides with decreasing day length and increasing temperature, which are possibly used as regulatory indicators. The eggs and the larvae growth are in surface waters. They can accidentally be caught in shallow sea ports, in this way some juveniles can be seen in these areas.

== Diet and foraging ==
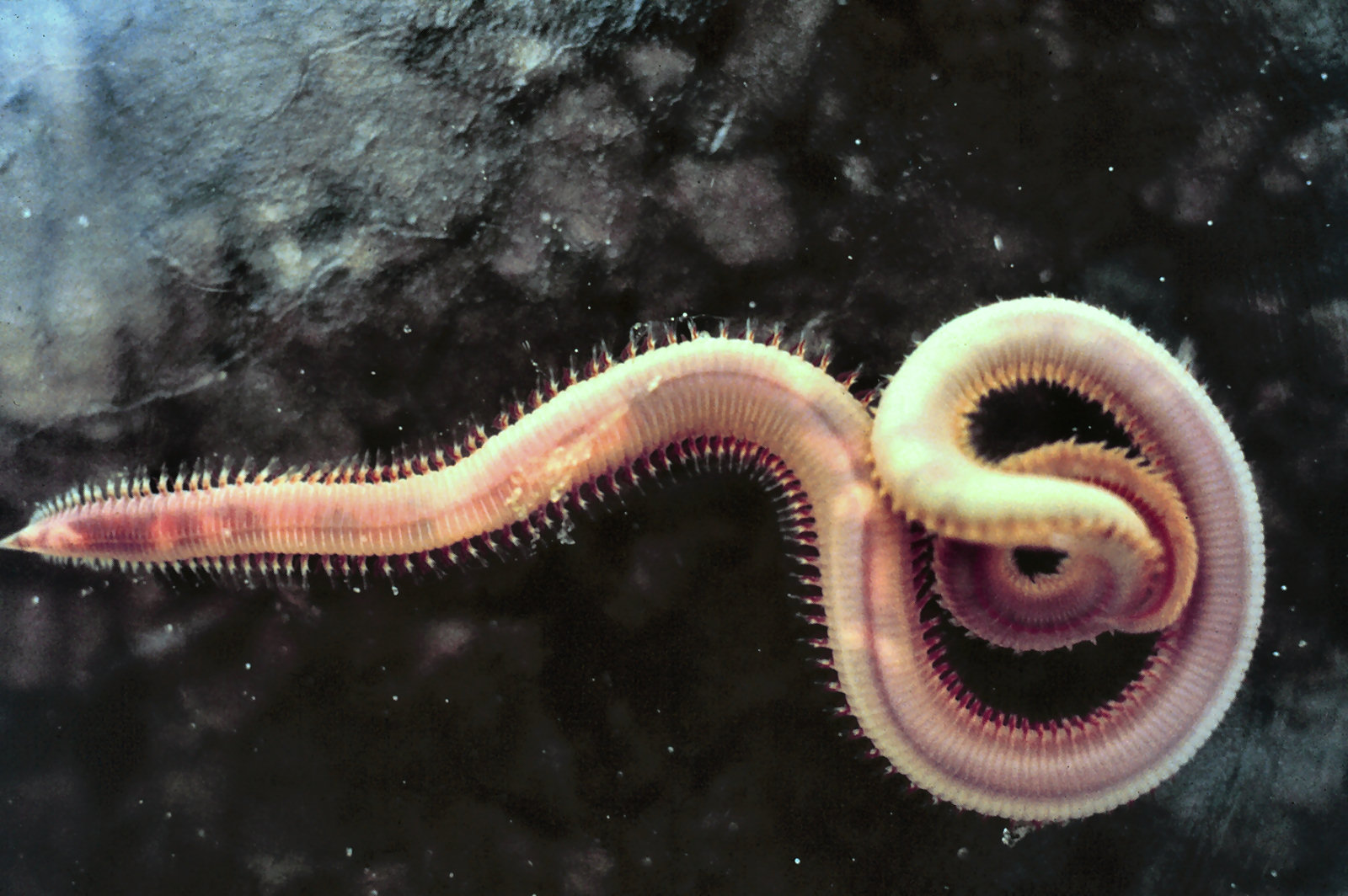
Polychaete worm

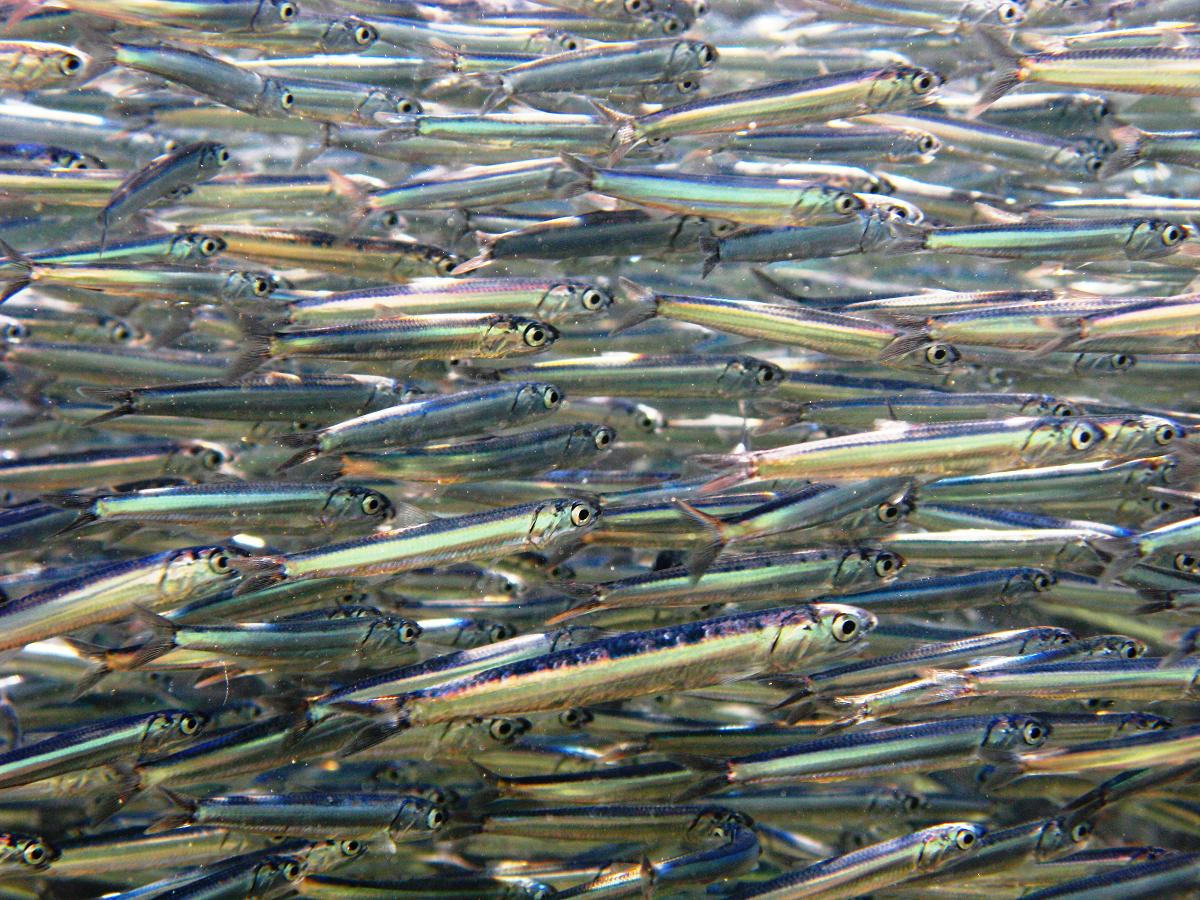
Anchovies

The bluefin gurnard is an opportunistic feeder, preying principally on crustaceans, but pretty much any small macrofauna such as shrimp/prawns, crabs, crayfish, lobster, amphipods, small fish, and polychaete worms. It uses modified fin rays under its pectorals to probe the sand for prey and may also use the large fan-like pectoral fins to offer prey mock shelter. They can be found in shallow water with soft ground after being stirred by winter storms and around the seasonal migrations of small shoreline fish like whitebait, anchovy, and pilchard.

Along the Australian shores, the bluefin gurnard seems to be one of the apex predators with dogfishes, dories, lings and other flatheads.

A possible use for its large pectoral fins may be to make it appear larger to scare off potential predators.

== Predators, Parasites, and Diseases ==
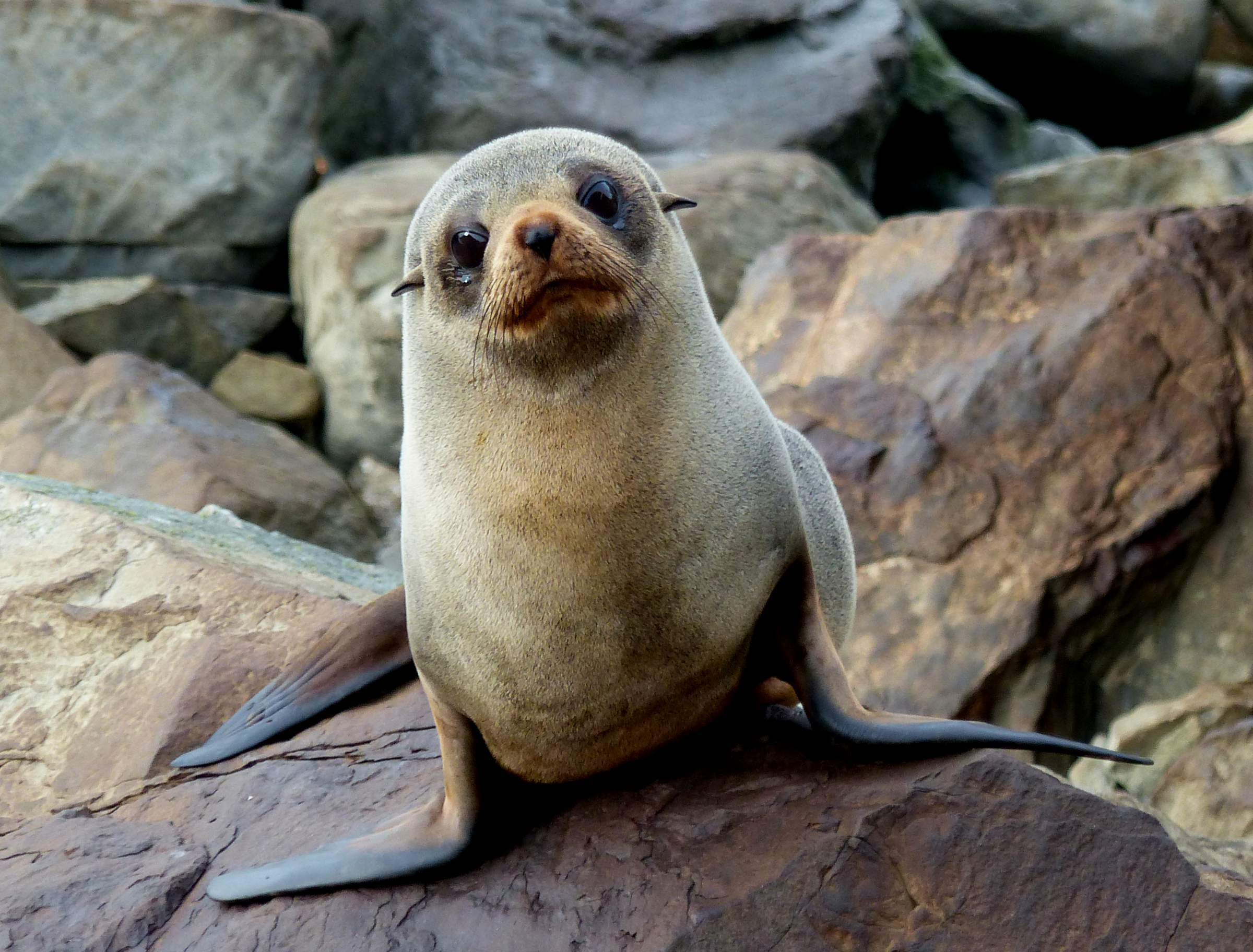
New Zealand fur seal

The bluefin gurnard's predators are not well-known. This fish has been found to have been included in the stomach contents of fur seals in Banks Peninsula, but does not represent an entire diet.

Some parasites can be found in the red gurnard. Nematoda larvae can infect this fish such as Anisakis or Contracaecum larvae which can be found in viscera, intestines, or other body cavities. The parasites found in the bluefin gurnard can be summarised into two different groups: Digenea and Nematoda.

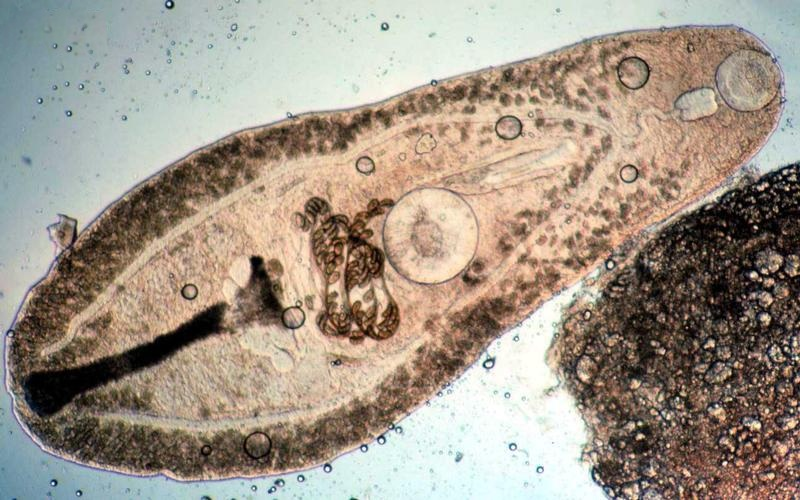
Helicometra, a parasite found in the intestine

Group	Species	Location in the red gurnard
DIGENEA	Stephanostomum australis	intestine
	Plagioporus preporatus	intestine
	Helicometra grandora	intestine
	Tubulovesiculu angusticauda	stomach
	Derogenes various	stomach
NEMATODA	Anisakis sp. larva	viscera, mesenteries, under peritoneum
	Contracaecum sp. larva	two types, in stomach, intestine and body cavity
	Ascarophis sp.	stomach
	Capillaria sp.	stomach

== In a human context ==
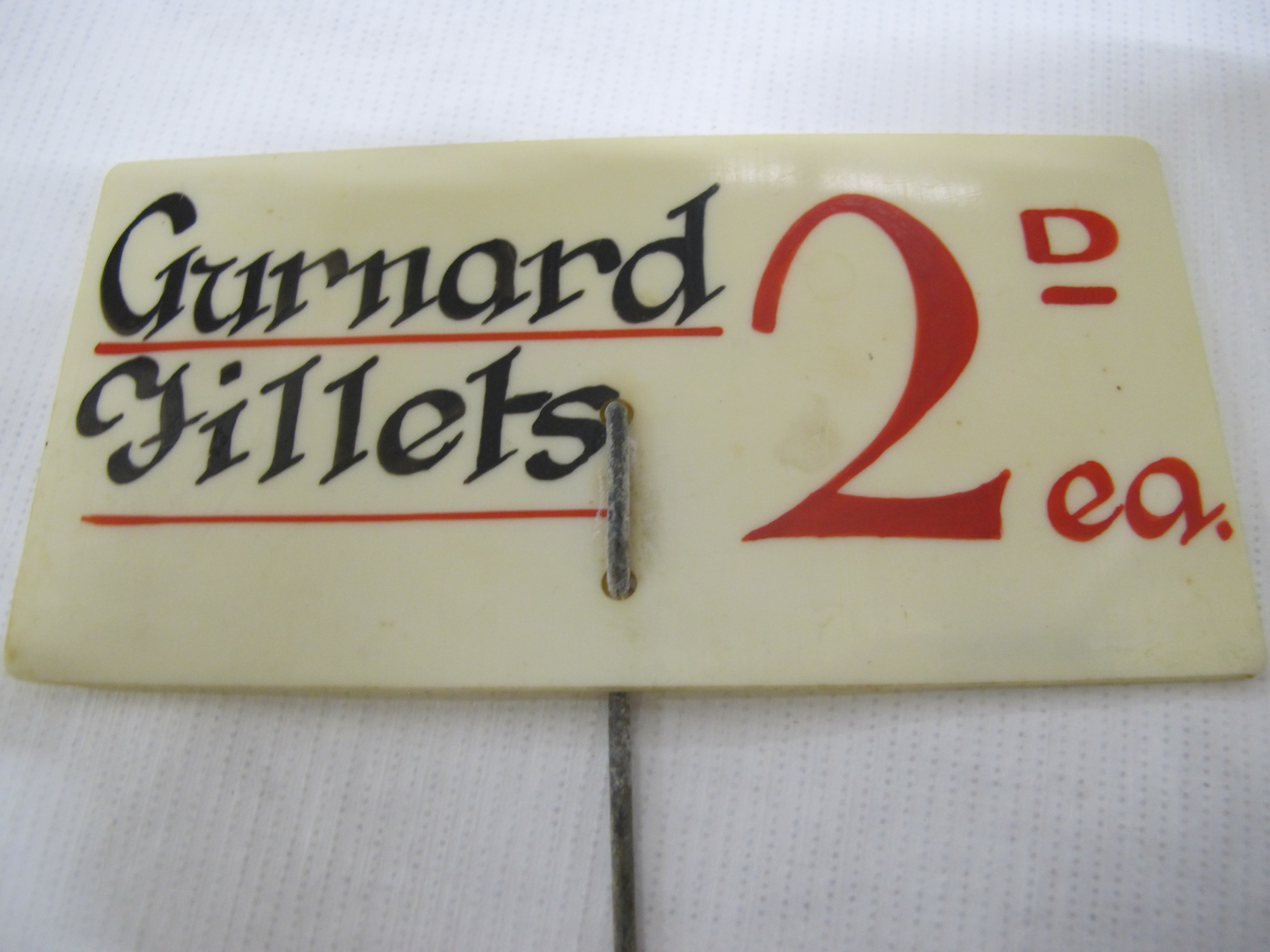
A commercial price tag for gurnard from a 1950s fish shop in New Zealand

The bluefin gurnard is a traditional food for Māori, however in some areas of New Zealand the fish had a poor reputation and was only rarely eaten. Early European settlers also shared this perception, often exporting the fish to Australia, where it had a better reputation. By the 20th Century, this reputation had reversed, and the bluefin gurnard became one of the most popular eating fish in New Zealand.

By the 1970s, the fish was the fourth-most caught species in New Zealand, and by the year 2000 approximately 4,000 tons were caught annually. Even if their number was low in the mid-1990s in New-Zealand, the population has increased and seems to stay constant. It has a very good, pink and firm flesh with a low rate of fat.

The bluefin gurnard is an important commercial fish in areas like Hawke Bay and Golden Bay via bottom-trawling or bottom long-lining, and also a regular catch of recreational fishers from boats and surf catching. The National Institute of Water and Atmospheric Research (NIWA) includes bluefin gurnard in a list of key inshore species to be trawl-surveyed every two years for the Ministry of Primary Fisheries (MPI) to assess populations and aid in informing fishery management. NIWA also holds interviews at recreational fishing ramps along Shelly Beach and the 20 busiest boat ramps along the North Island's northeast coast to gather information for further insight into population sizes and health, asking questions such as where fish had been caught, how big they were, and what bait had been used. The legal fishing size is 25 cm.

== Vocalisations ==
Bluefin gurnards are known to be quite vocal when captured, emitting loud grunts. Although referred to as "vocalisation", sounds are not actually made through laryngeal mechanics but are thought to be produced by contracting pairs of intrinsic sonic muscles in the swim bladder. The growling sound is a nocturnal vocalisation emitted at night and singly, whereas the grunts is produced when the animals are grouped. Grunts sounds last 0.2 seconds and can be heard without any advice, their frequency range are from 250 to 300 Hz. The fish is believed to be the loudest species in the family Triglidae.

A study of a captive female red gurnard and discovered four separate types of sound it can produce in two separate aural categories: grunt and growl. Its vocalizations were heard every hour around the clock with increases at dawn and dusk, and growls were made at night. The sounds were not found to be associated with feeding activity and in this setting were unlikely to be distress. The vocalizations may indicate associations with reproductive state as they are known to make the most noise during breeding season and generally are "likely to be significant contributors to [the] ambient underwater soundscape."
