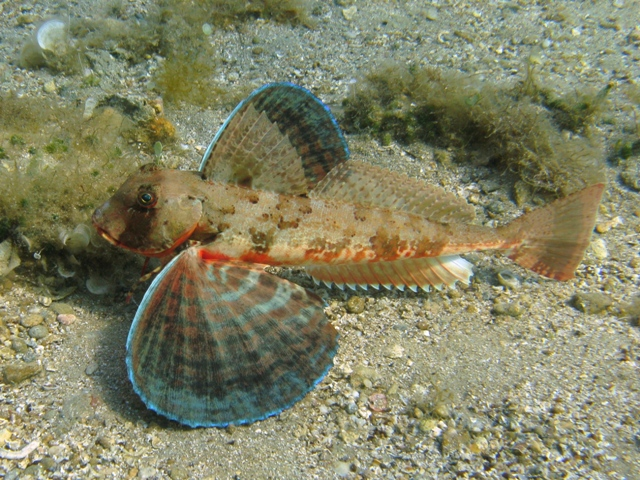

Conservation status
- Least Concern (IUCN 3.1)

Scientific classification
- Kingdom: Animalia
- Phylum: Chordata
- Class: Actinopterygii
- Order: Perciformes
- Family: Triglidae
- Genus: Chelidonichthys
- Subgenus: Trigloporus
- Species: C. lastoviza

Binomial name
- Chelidonichthys lastoviza (Bonnaterre, 1788)

Synonyms
- Trigla lastoviza Bonnaterre, 1788; Trigloporus lastoviza (Bonnaterre, 1788); Cuculus lineatus Pennant, 1769; Trigla lineata Gmelin, 1789; Trigloporus lineata (Gmelin, 1789); Trigla adriatica Gmelin, 1789; Trigla gonotus Rafinesque, 1810; Trigla africana J. L. B. Smith, 1934; Chelidonichthys africana (J. L. B. Smith, 1934); Trigloporus lastoviza africanus (J. L. B. Smith, 1934)

= Streaked gurnard =

Species of fish

The streaked gurnard (Chelidonichthys lastoviza), also known as the African gurnard or rock gurnard, is a species of ray-finned fish belonging to the family Triglidae, the gurnards and sea robins. This fish is found in the eastern Atlantic Ocean and western Indian Ocean. This species is of commercial importance as a food fish.

== Taxonomy ==
The streaked gurnard was first formally described as Trigla lastoviza in 1788 by the French naturalist Pierre Joseph Bonnaterre with the type locality given as Split, Croatia. In 1934 J. L. B. Smith described a new subgenus of the genus Trigla called Trigloporus for his newly described species Trigla africana. Some authorities have treated this as a valid genus but it is treated as a subgenus of Chelidonichthys.

=== Subspecies ===
There are two subspecies of streaked gurnard:

- Chelidonichthys lastoviza lastoviza (Bonnaterre, 1788) - the eastern Atlantic south to Angola
- Chelidonichthys lastoviza africana (J. L. B. Smith, 1934) Southern Africa

=== Etymology ===
The specific name of the streaked gurnard, lastoviza, is its common name in Split as reported by Brünnich whose description Bonnaterre based his published description on.

== Description ==
The streaked gurnard has a large triangular, bony head which bears many ridges and spines and with a deep occipital groove. There are two separate dorsal fins, the first contains between 9 and 11 spines while the second dorsal fin, and the anal fin, both have between 14 and 17 fin rays. The body is covered in clear, oblique ridges of skin starting on the lateral line. The breast may or may not have scales but the belly is scaled. The scales of the lateral line are enlarged and have small spines on them. The upper body is red, marked with dark spotting on the head and the back with a paler lower body. The pectoral fins are greyish marked with large dark blue spots. The three lower pectoral fin rays are separated from the rest of the fin. The head has an almost vertical profile on the snout. The maximum published total length of this species is 40 cm (16 in), although 15 cm (5.9 in) is more typical/

== Distribution and habitat ==
The streaked gurnard is found in the eastern Atlantic Ocean from southern Norway and Scotland to the Cape of Good Hope and round coast of South Africa into the southwestern Indian Ocean as far north as Mozambique. It is also found around the Macaronesian Islands and the islands in the Gulf of Guinea. It is found in the Mediterranean Sea but is absent from the Black Sea. This is a demersal species of rocky and sandy substrates and sand, found in shallow coastal water to waters as deep as 150 m (490 ft).

== Biology ==
Streaked gurnards may form schools when they are near the surface. Their diet is made up of small crustaceans. In European population spawning occurs in midsummer, running from June to August.

== Fisheries ==
The streaked gurnard is frequently caught in trawls but only the largest specimens are retained. It is regularly appears in fish markets in the western Mediterranean, Adriatic and Cyprus, infrequently elsewhere. The catch is marketed fresh or chilled.
