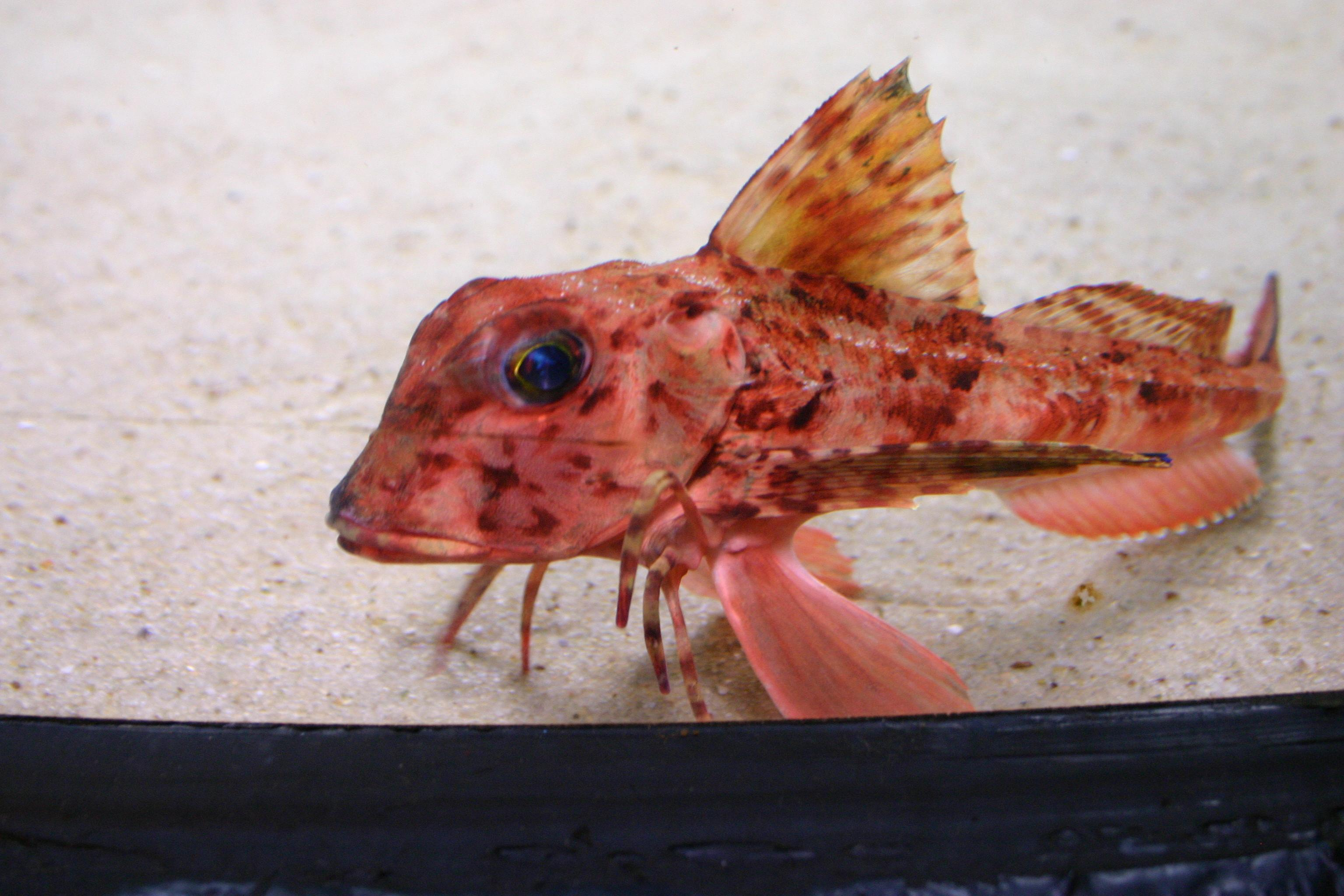

Conservation status
- Least Concern (IUCN 3.1)

Scientific classification
- Kingdom: Animalia
- Phylum: Chordata
- Class: Actinopterygii
- Division: Teleostei
- Order: Perciformes
- Family: Triglidae
- Genus: Chelidonichthys
- Subgenus: Aspitrigla
- Species: C. cuculus

Binomial name
- Chelidonichthys cuculus (Linnaeus, 1758)

Synonyms
- Aspitrigla cuculus (Linnaeus, 1758); Chelidonichthys cululus (Linnaeus, 1758); Trigla cuculus Linnaeus, 1758; Trigla grunniens Lacépède, 1801; Trigla pini Bloch, 1793

= Red gurnard =

Species of fish

The red gurnard (Chelidonichthys cuculus), also known as the East Atlantic red gurnard or soldier, is a benthic species of ray-finned fish belonging to the family Triglidae, the gurnards and sea robins. This fish is found in the eastern Atlantic Ocean, including the Mediterranean Sea and the Black Sea.

== Taxonomy ==
The red gurnard was first formally described in 1758 as Trigla cuculus by Carl Linnaeus in the 10th edition of his Systema Naturae with the type locality given as the Mediterranean Sea. In 1925 the American zoologist Henry Weed Fowler classified this species in the monotypic taxon Aspitrigla, a subgenus of Chelidonichthys, and the red gurnard is the type species of the subgenus. The specific name cuculus is Latin for "cuckoo", a name which can be traced as far back as Aristotle, who said gurnards made cuckoo-like noises when taken from the water.

== Description ==
The red gurnard has a large angular head which does not have a deep occipital groove but has a steep snout, which is elongated forward with a flattened, two lobed rostrum covered in denticles. The first dorsal fin contains 9 or 10 spines, the first of which is serrated to the front and the second spine is not elongated. the second dorsal fin has 17 or 19 soft rays while the anal fin contains between 16 and 18 soft rays. The pectoral fins have 2 or 3 enlarged, separate rays. The scales in the lateral line resemble plates having been lengthened vertically. There are no scales on the breast and the front part of the belly. The colour is bright red on the upper body, pale on the lower body with pink pelvic fins. The anal fin is white at its base while the pectoral and dorsal fins are yellowish. This fish has a maximum published total length of 70 cm (28 in), although a fork length of 27.6 cm (10.9 in) in males and 20.4 cm (8.0 in) in females is more typical.

== Distribution and habitat ==
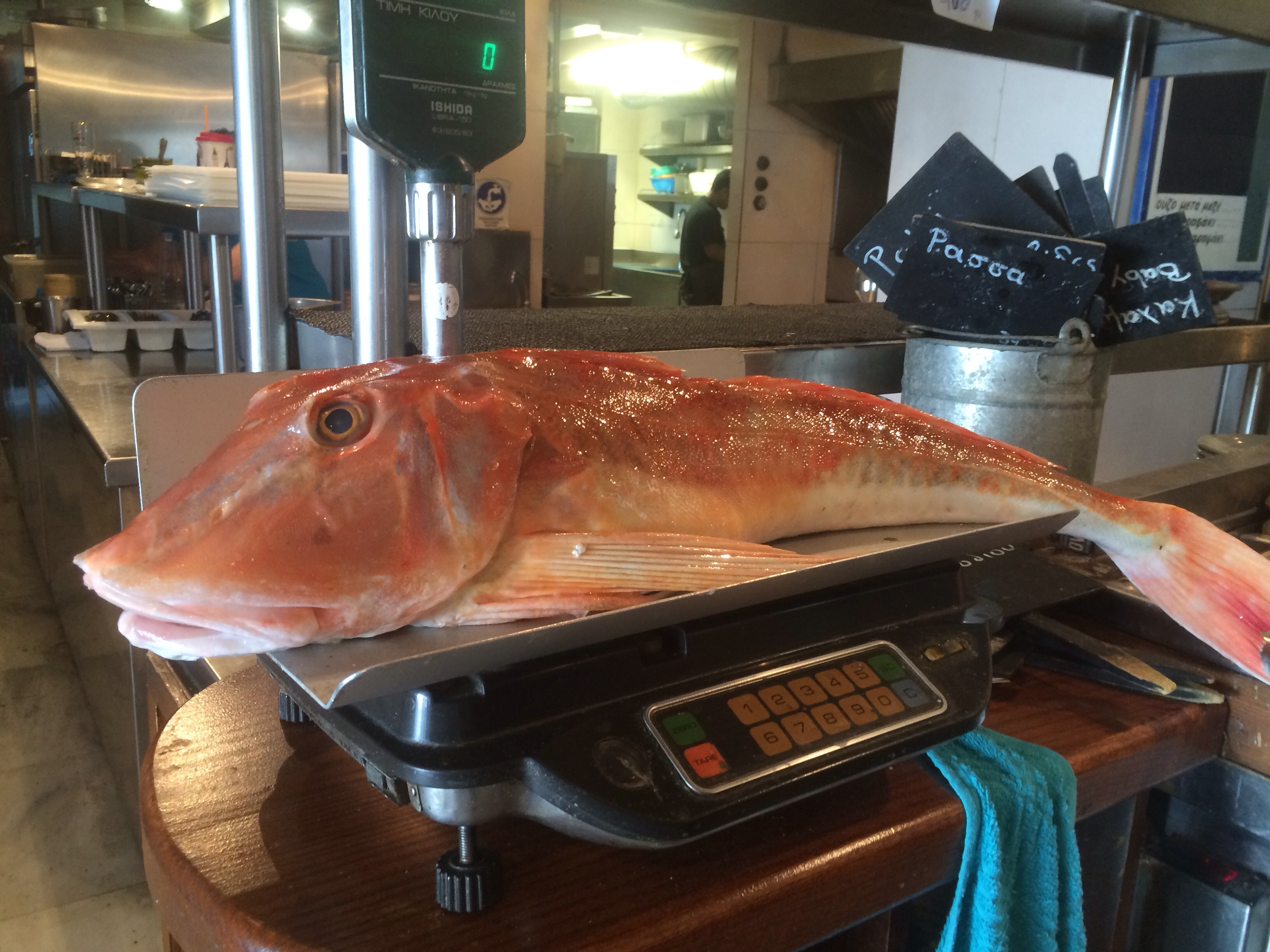
Red gurnard served at a taverna in Athens, Greece

The red gurnard is found in the eastern Atlantic Ocean from southern Scotland, although it has been recorded infrequently from Norway, south to Mauritania, including the Madeira, the Azores and the Canary Islands. It is found throughout the Mediterranean Sea and in the Black Sea. This is a demersal species which has been recorded from depths between 15 and 400 m (49 and 1,312 ft), although the usual range is 30 and 250 m (98 and 820 ft). It is typically recorded on habitats dominated by sand or gravel, although it has also been found in rocky and muddy habitats.

== Biology ==
The red gurnard was found, in a study of this species in the Adriatic Sea, to feed almost entirely (more than 90%) on malacostracan crustaceans with fishes, molluscs and echinoderms taken in much smaller amounts. Prey is detected using the enlarged, separated rays of the pectoral fins. This species produces sounds, being noted to croak like a frog. It sometimes aggregates in schools, and it is known to spawn in the summer. Sexual maturity is attained at around 26.6 cm (10.5 in) and the maximum reported age is 21 years.

== Fisheries ==
The red gurnard is not commercially exploited in its Atlantic range, although it may be caught and eaten as bycatch. In England, red gurnard is fished off the Cornwall coast and is of growing though still minor economic interest. In the Mediterranean, it is of minor commercial interest. Red gurnards are regularly present in fish markets in Spain, Morocco, Italy, Cyprus and Egypt, and sometimes in France, England, Greece, Ireland and Turkey, although it is rarely marketed in Tunisia. The catch is sold fresh, chilled and frozen.
