= Pisces in the 10th edition of Systema Naturae =

In the 10th edition of Systema Naturae, Carl Linnaeus described the Pisces as:

Always inhabiting the waters; are swift in their motion and voracious in their appetites. They breathe by means of gills, which are generally united by a bony arch; swim by means of radiate fins, and are mostly covered over with cartilaginous scales. Besides the parts they have in common with other animals, they are furnished with a nictitant membrane, and most of them with a swim-bladder, by the contraction or dilatation of which, they can raise or sink themselves in their element at pleasure.

Linnaean Characteristics

- Heart: 1 auricle, 1 ventricle. Cold, dark red blood
- Gills: external
- Jaw: incumbent
- Penis: (usually) none
- Eggs: without whites
- Organs of Sense: tongue, nostrils?, eyes, ears
- Covering: imbricate scales
- Supports: fins. Swims in the Water & Smacks.

== Apodes ==
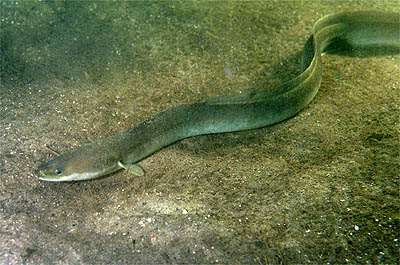
The European eel was named Muraena angvilla in 1758.

Muraena (eels)

- Muraena helena – Mediterranean moray
- Muraena ophis – Spotted snake eel
- Muraena serpens – Serpent eel
- Muraena anguilla – European eel
- Muraena myrus – Painted eel
- Muraena conger – European conger
- Muraena caeca – European finless eel

Gymnotus (electric knifefishes)

- Gymnotus carapo – Banded knifefish
- Gymnotus asiaticus – Snakehead

Trichiurus (cutlassfishes)

- Trichiurus lepturus – Largehead hairtail

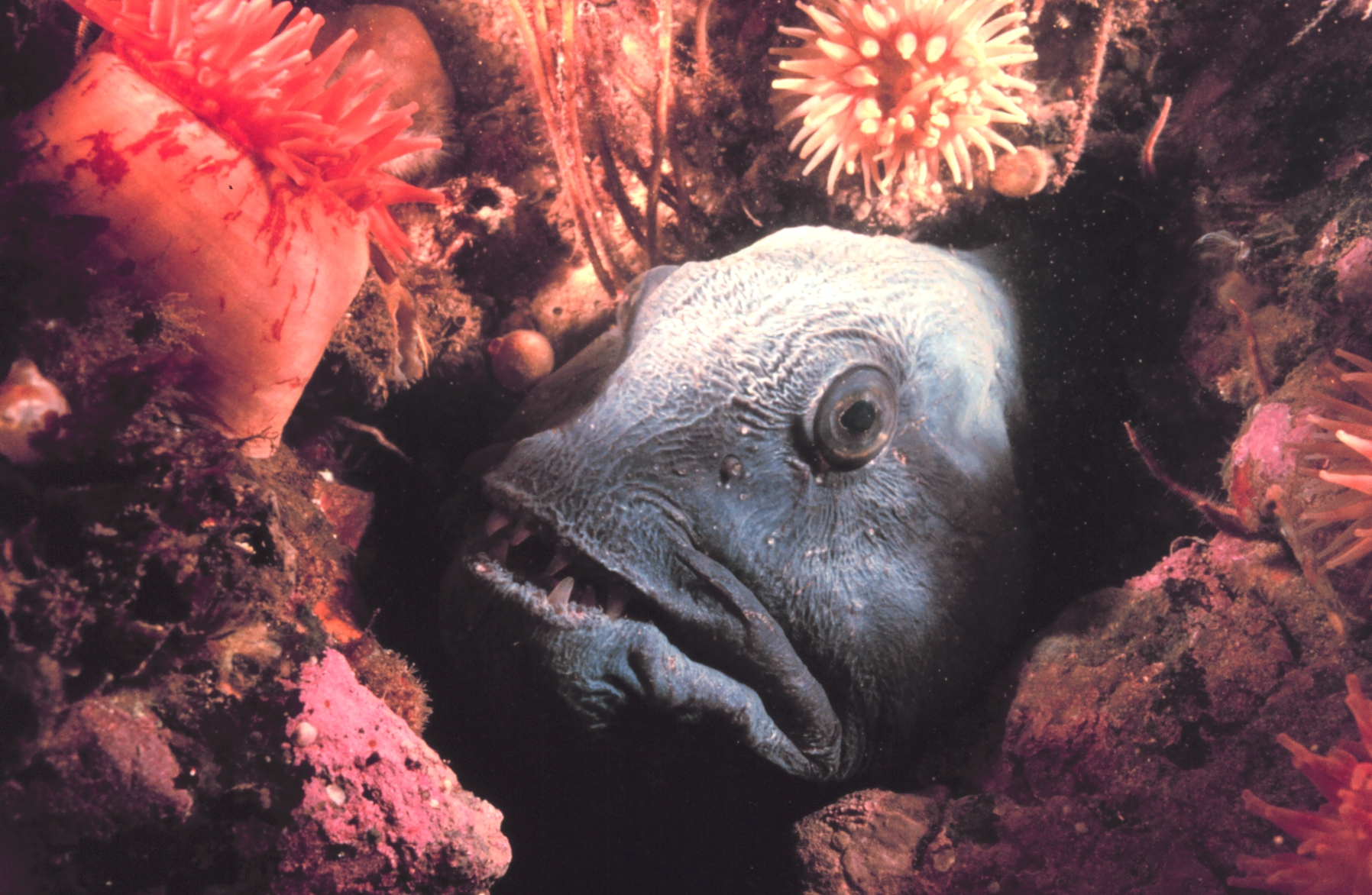
The seawolf was named Anarhichas lupus in 1758.

Anarhichas (wolffishes)

- Anarhichas lupus – Atlantic wolffish

Ammodytes (sand eels)

- Ammodytes tobianus – Lesser sand eel

Stromateus (butterfishes)

- Stromateus fiatola – Blue Butterfish
- Stromateus paru – American Harvestfish

Xiphias (swordfishes)

- Xiphias gladius – Swordfish

== Jugulares ==
Callionymus (dragonets)

- Callionymus lyra & Callionymus dracunculus – Common Dragonet
- Callionymus indicus – Bartail flathead

Uranoscopus (stargazers)

- Uranoscopus scaber – Uranoscopus scaber

Trachinus (weevers)

- Trachinus draco – Greater weever

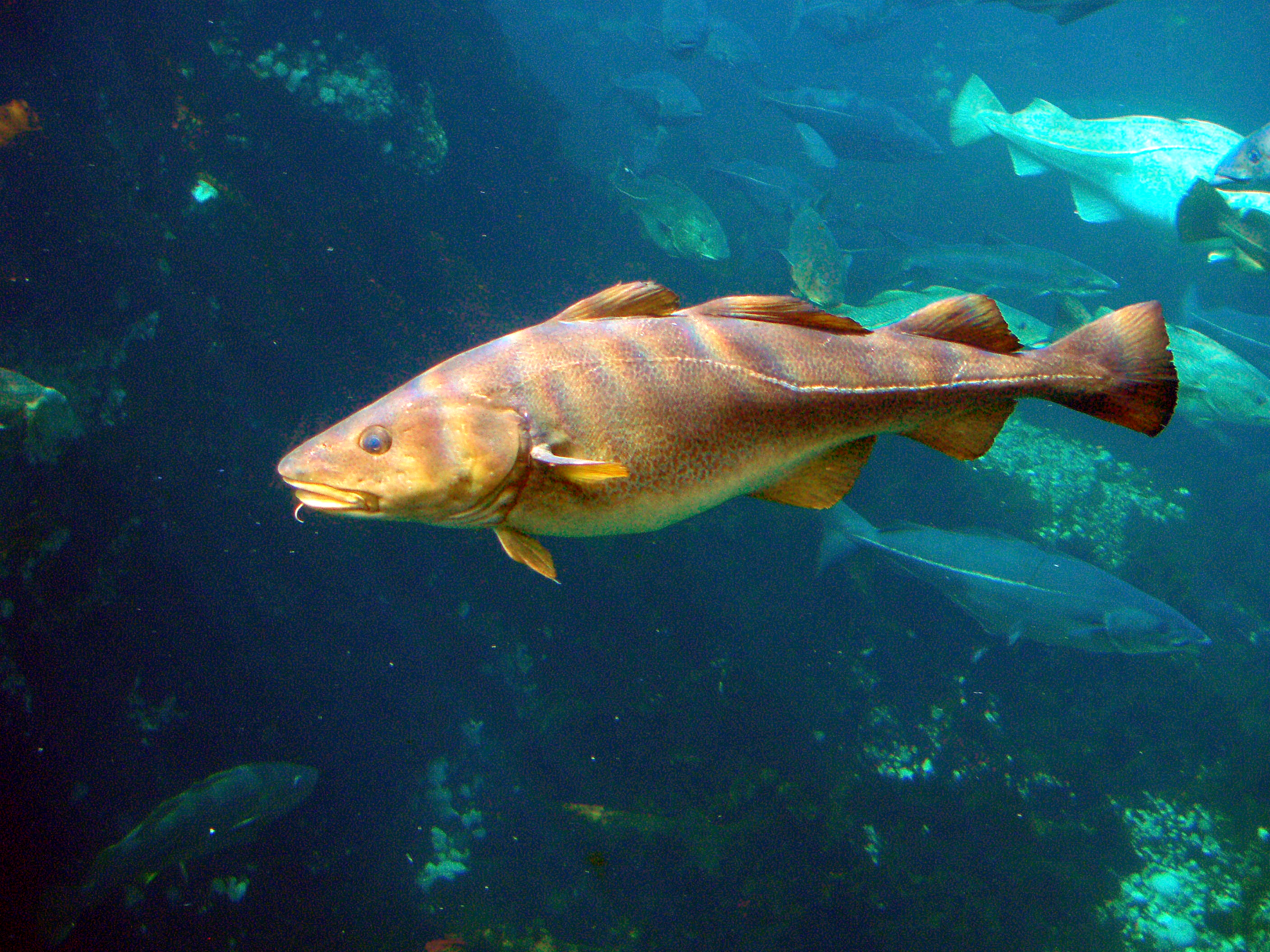
The Atlantic cod was named Gadus morhua & Gadus callarias in 1758.

Gadus (cod & kin)

- Gadus aeglefinus – Haddock
- Gadus morhua & Gadus callarias – Atlantic Cod
- Gadus luscus & Gadus barbatus – Pouting
- Gadus minutus – Poor cod
- Gadus virens & Gadus carbonarius – Coalfish
- Gadus merlangus – Whiting
- Gadus pollachius – Pollock
- Gadus merluccius – European hake
- Gadus molva – Common ling
- Gadus lota – Burbot
- Gadus mustela – Fivebeard rockling
- Gadus mediterraneus – Shore rockling

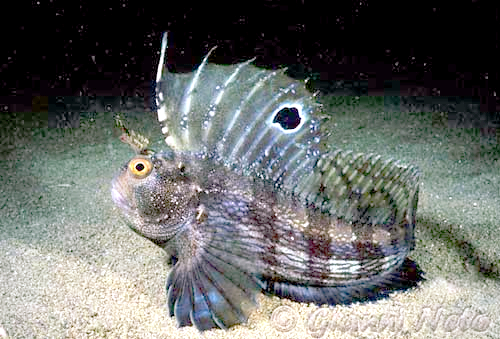
The butterfly blenny was named Blennius ocellaris in 1758.

Blennius (blennies)

- Blennius galerita – Montagu's blenny
- Blennius cristatus – Molly Miller
- Blennius cornutus – Horned blenny
- Blennius ocellaris – Butterfly Blenny
- Blennius gattorugine – Tompot blenny
- Blennius superciliosus – Clinus superciliosus
- Blennius mustelarius – nomen dubium
- Blennius pholis – Combtooth blenny
- Blennius gunnellus – Rock gunnel
- Blennius viviparus – Viviparous eelpout
- Blennius lumpenus – unknown
- Blennius raninus – Tadpole fish

Ophidion (cusk-eels)

- Ophidion barbatum – Snake blenny
- Ophidion imberbe – Rock gunnel
- Ophidion macrophthalmum – Red bandfish

== Thoracici ==
Cyclopterus (Lumpfishes)

- Cyclopterus lumpus – Cyclopterus lumpus
- Cyclopterus nudus – Gobiesox nudus

Echeneis (Remoras)

- Echeneis remora – Common remora
- Echeneis neucrates – Live sharksucker

Coryphaena (Dolphinfishes)

- Coryphaena hippurus – Common dolphinfish
- Coryphaena equiselis – Pompano dolphinfish
- Coryphaena pentadactyla – Fivefinger wrasse
- Coryphaena novacula – Pearly razorfish
- Coryphaena pompilus – Black ruff

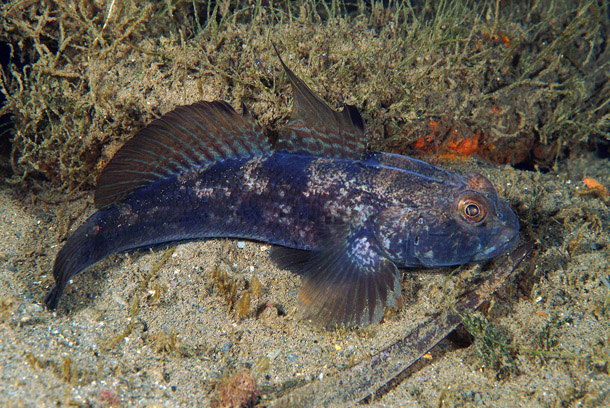
The black goby was named Gobius niger & Gobius jozo in 1758.

Gobius (Gobies)

- Gobius niger & Gobius jozo – Black goby
- Gobius paganellus – Rock goby
- Gobius eleotris
- Gobius aphya
- Gobius pectinirostris – Blue-spotted mud hopper
- Gobius anguillaris – Taenioides anguillaris

Cottus (Sculpins)

- Cottus cataphractus – Agonus cataphractus
- Cottus quadricornis – Fourhorn sculpin
- Cottus grunniens – Allenbatrachus grunniens
- Cottus scaber – Grammoplites scaber
- Cottus scorpius – Shorthorn sculpin
- Cottus gobio – European bullhead

Scorpaena (Scorpionfishes)

- Scorpaena porcus – European scorpionfish
- Scorpaena scrofa – Bigscale scorpionfish

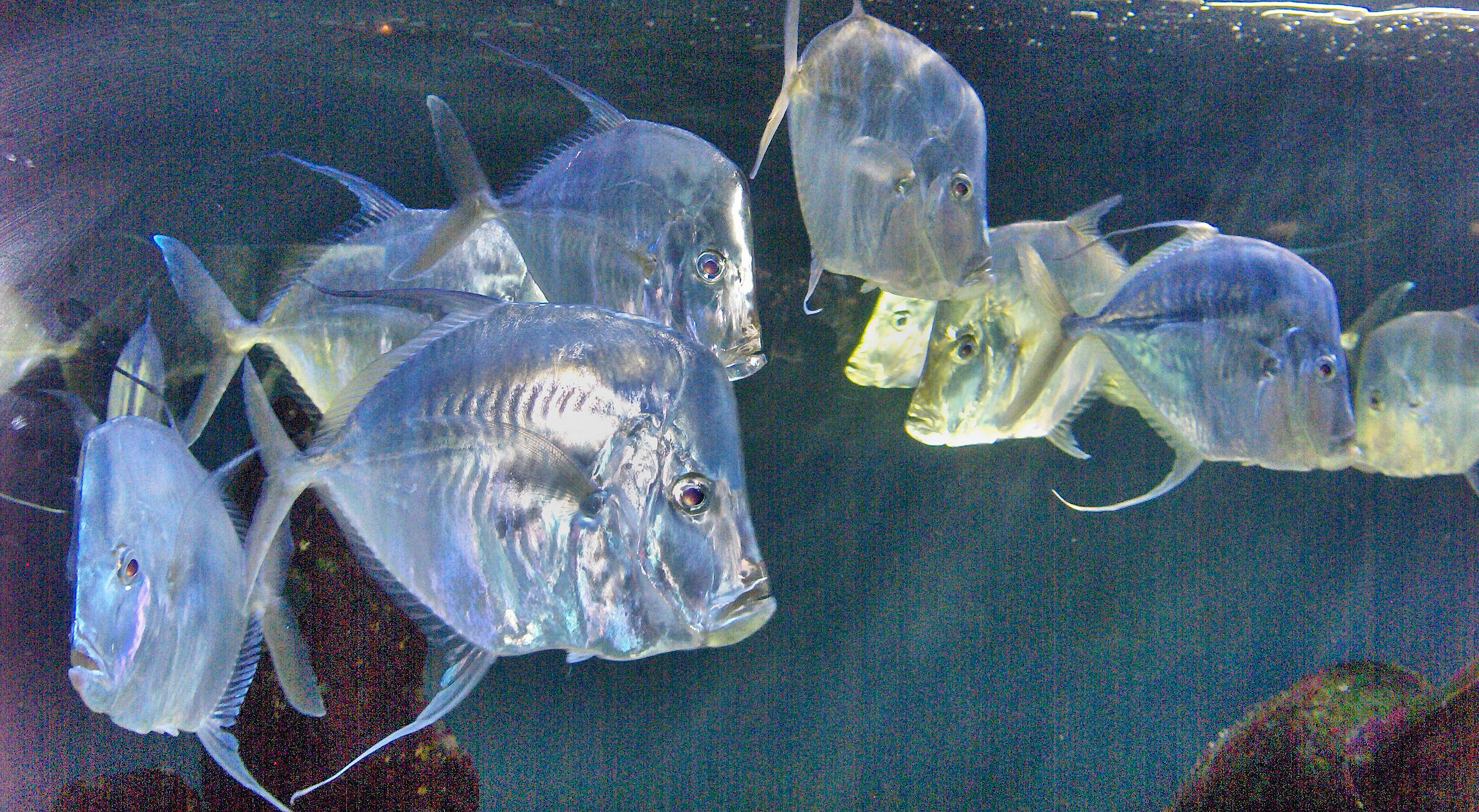
The lookdown was named Zeus vomer in 1758.

Zeus (John Dories & kin)

- Zeus vomer – Lookdown
- Zeus gallus – Alectis ciliaris
- Zeus faber – John Dory
- Zeus aper – Capros aper

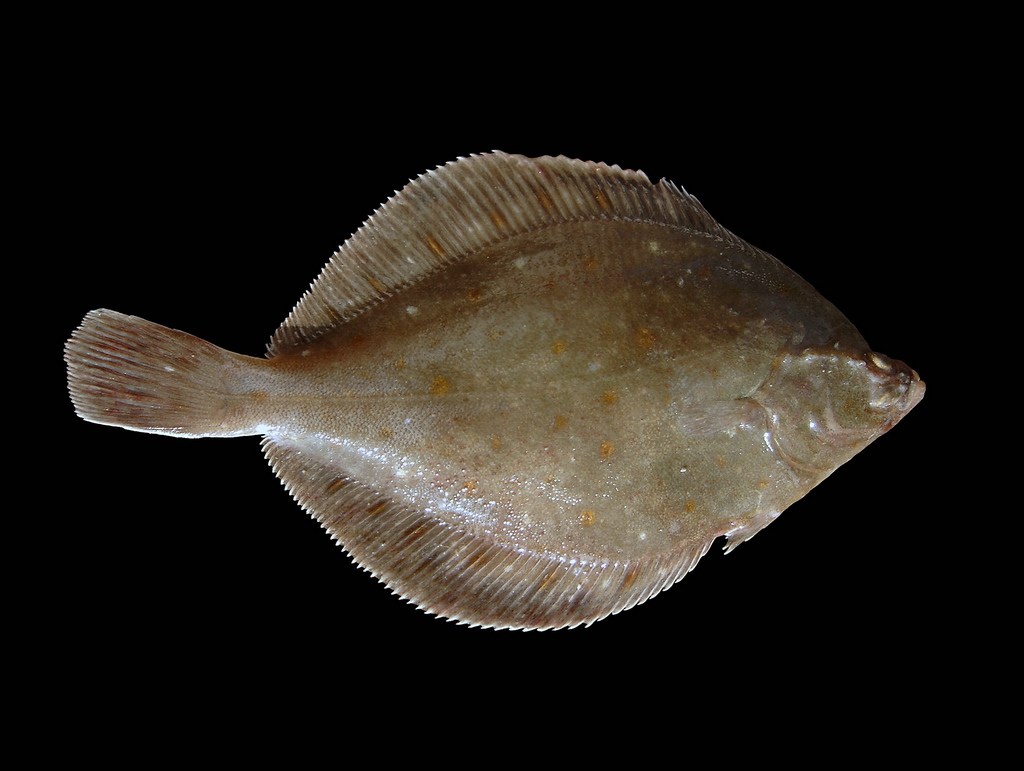
The European plaice was named Pleuronectes platessa in 1758.

Pleuronectes (Flatfishes)

- Pleuronectes achirus – Achirus achirus
- Pleuronectes trichodactylus – Monochirus trichodactylus
- Pleuronectes lineatus – Lined sole
- Pleuronectes ocellatus – Microchirus ocellatus
- Pleuronectes lunatus – Plate fish
- Pleuronectes hippoglossus – Atlantic halibut
- Pleuronectes cynoglossus – Trobay sole
- Pleuronectes platessa – European plaice
- Pleuronectes flesus & Pleuronectes passer – European flounder
- Pleuronectes limanda – Common dab
- Pleuronectes solea – Common sole
- Pleuronectes linguatula – Citharus linguatula
- Pleuronectes rhombus – Brill
- Pleuronectes maximus – Turbot
- Pleuronectes papillosus – Syacium papillosum

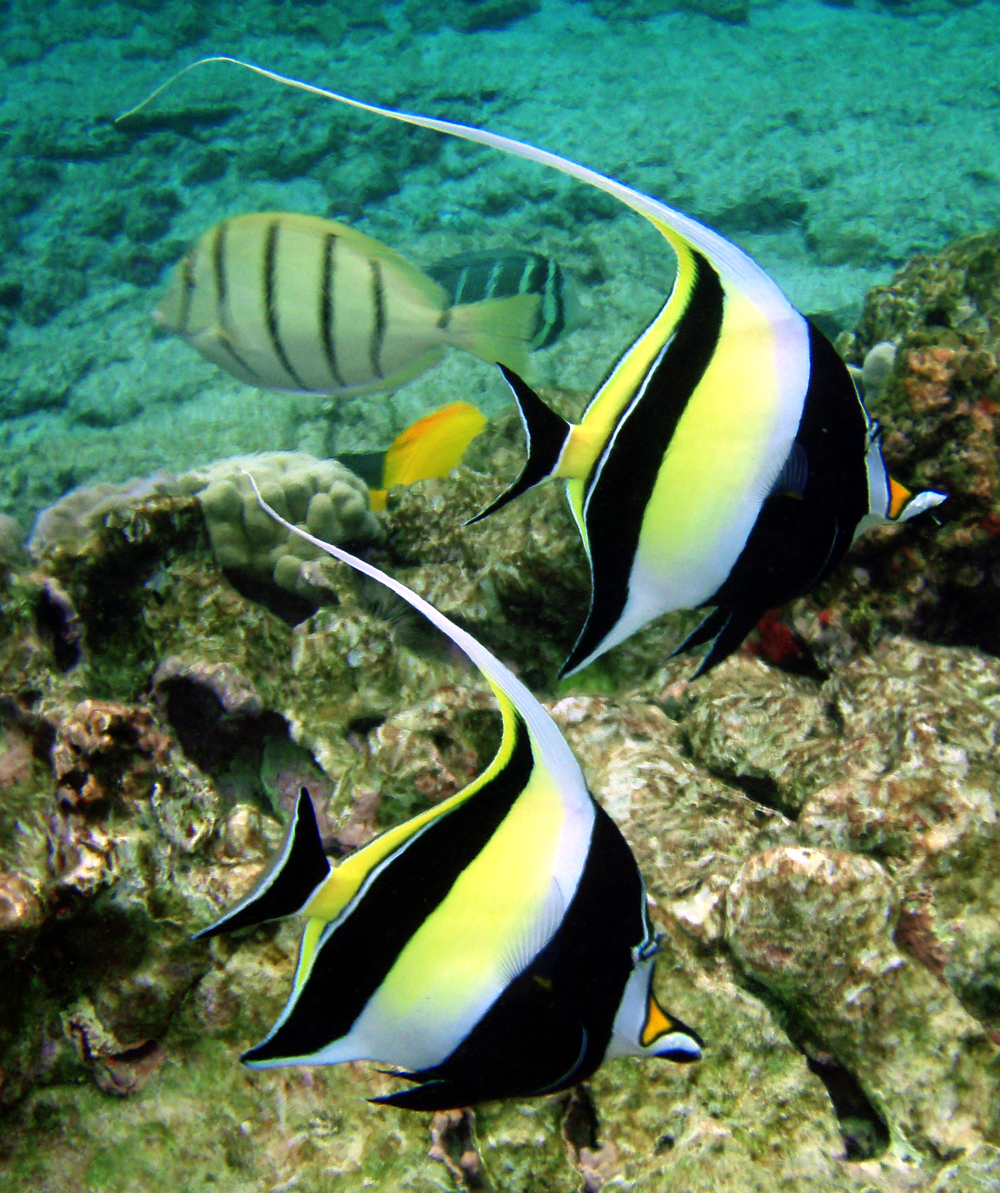
The Moorish idol was named Chaetodon canescens & Chaetodon cornutus in 1758.

Chaetodon (Butterflyfishes, Angelfishes, & kin)

- Chaetodon canescens & Chaetodon cornutus – Moorish idol
- Chaetodon argenteus – Silver moony
- Chaetodon acuminatus & Chaetodon macrolepidotus – Pennant coralfish
- Chaetodon pinnatus – Dusky batfish
- Chaetodon punctatus – Drepane punctata
- Chaetodon arcuatus – Gray angelfish
- Chaetodon rostratus – Copperband butterflyfish
- Chaetodon nigricans – Acanthurus nigricans
- Chaetodon triostegus – Convict surgeonfish
- Chaetodon lineatus – Striped surgeon
- Chaetodon striatus – Banded butterflyfish
- Chaetodon aruanus – Whitetail dascyllus
- Chaetodon capistratus – Foureye butterflyfish
- Chaetodon vagabundus – Vagabond butterflyfish
- Chaetodon ciliaris – Queen angelfish
- Chaetodon saxatilis – Sergeant major
- Chaetodon rotundus – Abudefduf septemfasciatus
- Chaetodon lanceolatus – Jack-knifefish

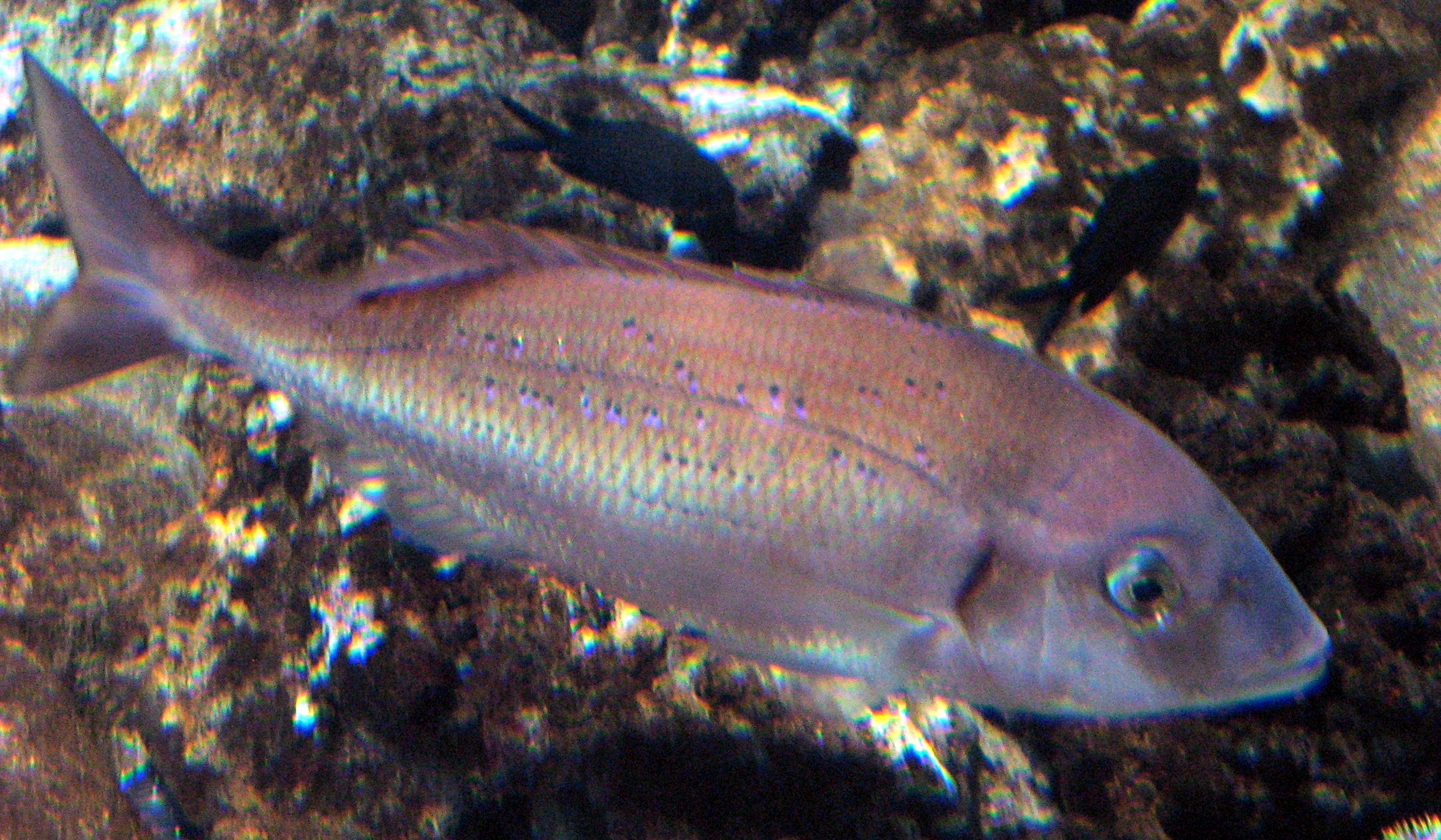
The red porgy was named Sparus orphus & Sparus pagrus in 1758.

Sparus (Breams and Porgies)

- Sparus aurata – Gilt-head bream
- Sparus annularis – Diplodus annularis
- Sparus sargus – Diplodus sargus
- Sparus melanurus – Saddled seabream
- Sparus smaris – Spicara smaris
- Sparus maena – Spicara maena
- Sparus saxatilis – Crenicichla saxatilis
- Sparus orphus & Sparus pagrus – Red porgy
- Sparus hurta & Sparus mormyrus – Lithognathus mormyrus
- Sparus erythrinus – Common pandora
- Sparus boops – Boops boops
- Sparus cantharus – Black seabream
- Sparus chromis – Chromis chromis
- Sparus salpa – Salema porgy
- Sparus synagris – Lane snapper
- Sparus dentex – Common dentex
- Sparus spinus – Siganus spinus
- Sparus virginicus – Porkfish
- Sparus capistratus
- Sparus galilaeus – Mango tilapia

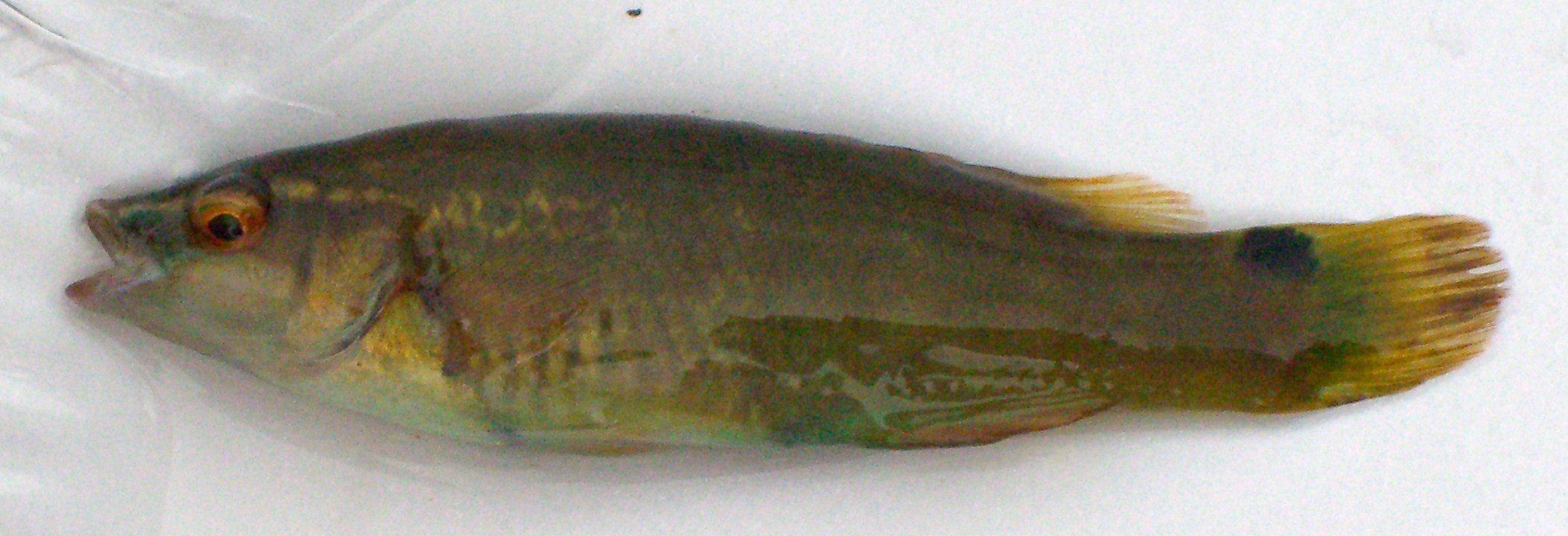
The goldsinny wrasse was named Labrus suillus & Labrus rupestris in 1758.

Labrus (Wrasses, Parrotfishes, & kin)

- Labrus scarus
- Labrus cretensis – Mediterranean parrotfish
- Labrus anthias – Anthias anthias
- Labrus hepatus – Serranus hepatus
- Labrus griseus – Mangrove snapper
- Labrus lunaris – Moon wrasse
- Labrus opercularis – Paradise fish
- Labrus pavo – Ornate wrasse
- Labrus auritus – Redbreast sunfish
- Labrus falcatus – Permit
- Labrus rufus – Spanish hogfish
- Labrus marginalis
- Labrus ferrugineus
- Labrus julis & Labrus paroticus – Mediterranean rainbow wrasse
- Labrus suillus & Labrus rupestris – Goldsinny wrasse
- Labrus striatus – Black sea bass
- Labrus gvaza – Venezuelan grouper
- Labrus ocellaris
- Labrus tinca – Symphodus tinca
- Labrus bimaculatus – Cichlasoma bimaculatum
- Labrus punctatus – Polycentrus schomburgkii
- Labrus melops – Corkwing wrasse
- Labrus niloticus – Nile perch
- Labrus ossifagus, Labrus mixtus, & Labrus varius – Cuckoo wrasse
- Labrus onitis – Tautog
- Labrus viridis – Green wrasse
- Labrus luscus – Green wrasse
- Labrus livens – Labrus merula
- Labrus turdus – Labrus viridis
- Labrus exoletus & Labrus chinensis – Centrolabrus exoletus
- Labrus linearis
- Labrus fulvus – Cephalopholis fulva
- Labrus radiatus – Puddingwife wrasse
- Labrus merula – Brown wrasse
- Labrus cynaedus

Sciaena (Snappers & Croakers)

- Sciaena cappa
- Sciaena lepisma
- Sciaena unimaculata
- Sciaena umbra – Brown meagre
- Sciaena cirrosa – Umbrina cirrosa

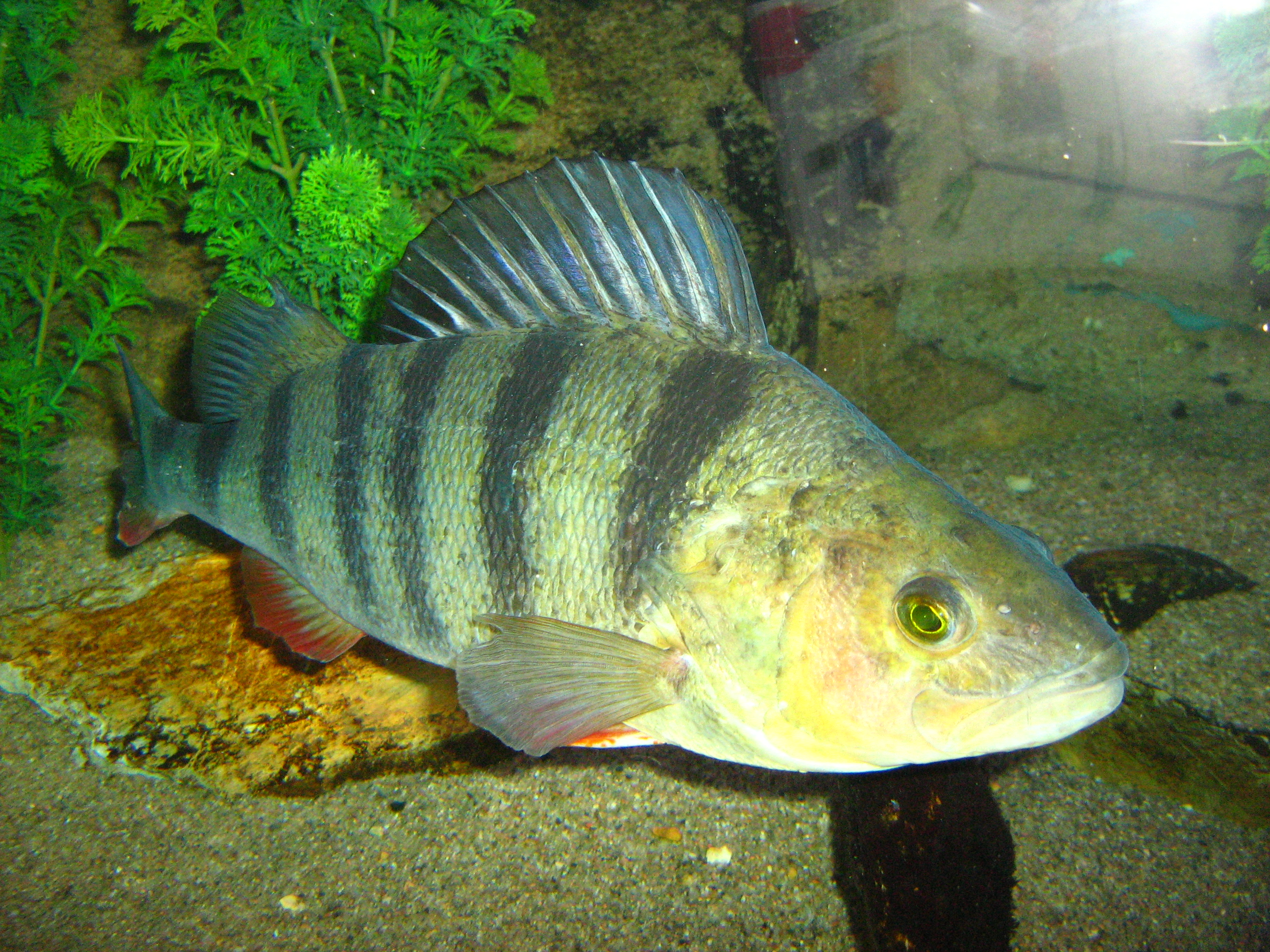
The European perch was named Perca fluviatilis in 1758.

Perca (Perch, Grouper, & kin)

- Perca fluviatilis – European perch
- Perca lucioperca – Zander (Sander lucioperca)
- Perca asper – Asper (Zingel asper)
- Perca labrax – European seabass (Dicentrarchus labrax)
- Perca nilotica – Nile tilapia (Oreochromis niloticus)
- Perca marina – Painted comber (Serranus scriba)
- Perca nobilis – Barred grunt (Conodon nobilis)
- Perca polymna – Saddleback clownfish (Amphiprion polymnus)
- Perca cottoides – Marbled stingfish (Cottapistus cottoides)
- Perca philadelphica – Centropristis philadelphica
- Perca mediterranea – Axillary wrasse (Symphodus mediterraneus)
- Perca vittata – Oriental Sweetlips (Plectorhinchus vittatus)
- Perca punctata – Coney (Cephalopholis fulva)
- Perca guttata – Red hind (Epinephelus guttatus)
- Perca scriba – Painted comber (Serranus scriba)
- Perca venenosa – Yellowfin grouper (Mycteroperca venenosa)
- Perca melanura – Cottonwick grunt (Haemulon melanurum)
- Perca gibbosa – Pumpkinseed (Lepomis gibbosus)
- Perca saltatrix – Kyphosus sectatrix
- Perca stigma
- Perca diagramma – Striped sweetlips (Plectorhinchus diagrammus)
- Perca striata – Striped grunt (Haemulon striatum)
- Perca lineata – Yellowbanded sweetlips (Plectorhinchus lineatus)
- Perca rhomboidalis – Western Atlantic seabream (Archosargus rhomboidalis)
- Perca cernua – Ruffe (Gymnocephalus cernua)
- Perca schraetser – Striped ruffe Gymnocephalus schraetser
- Perca argentea – Terapon theraps
- Perca cabrilla – Comber (Serranus cabrilla)
- Perca radula

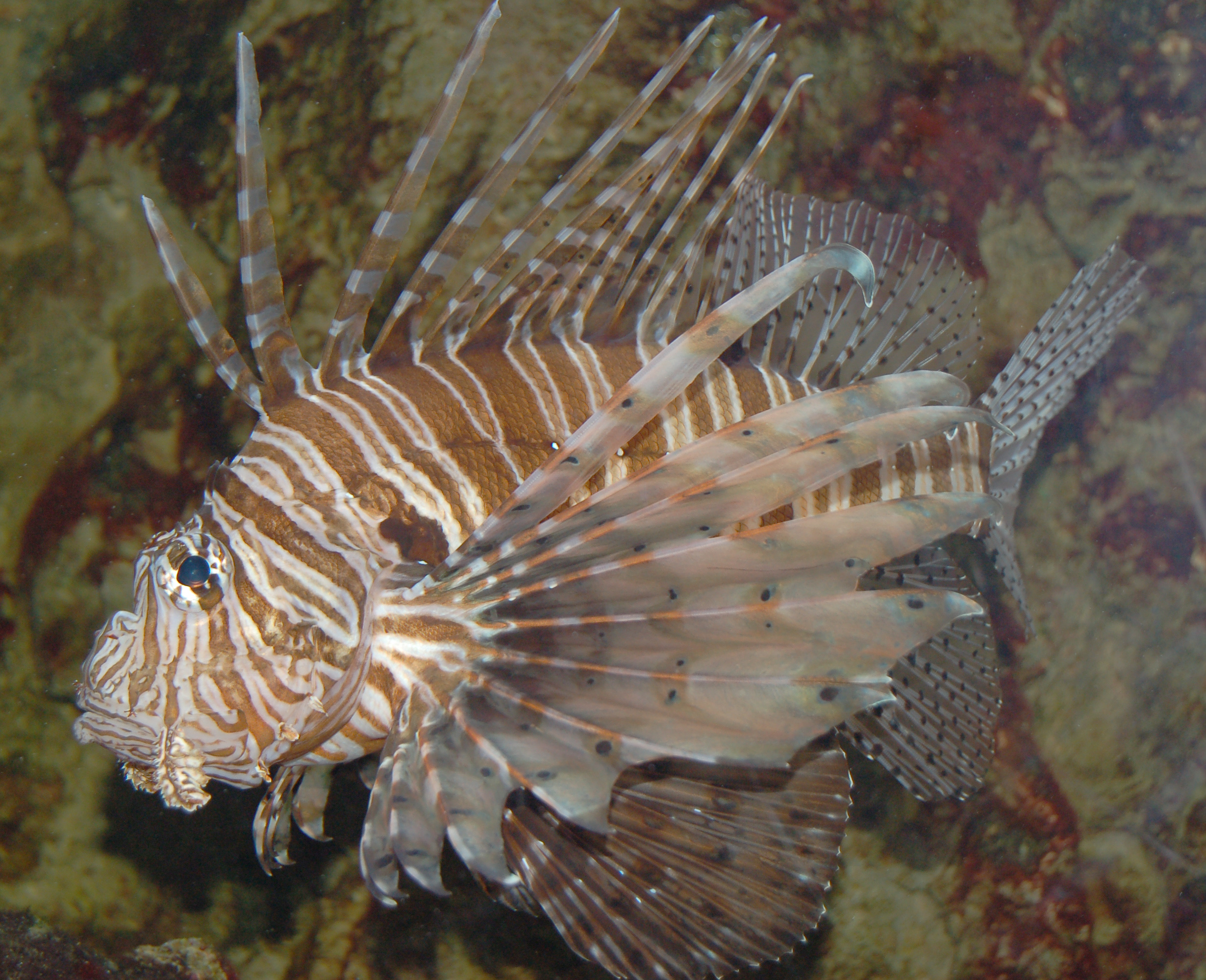
The red lionfish was named Gasterosteus volitans in 1758.

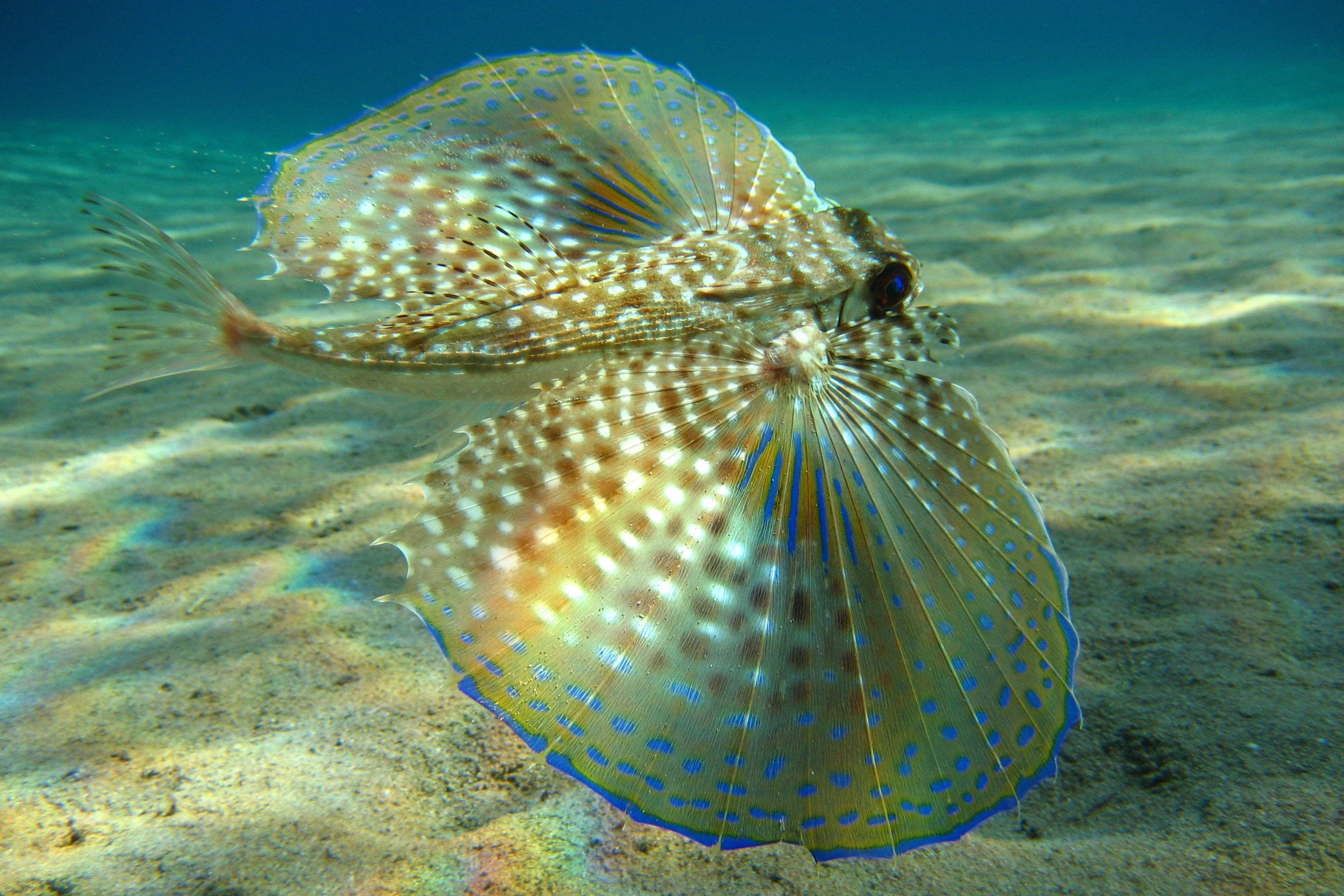
The flying gurnard was named Gasterosteus spinarella & Trigla volitans in 1758.

Gasterosteus (Sticklebacks & kin)

- Gasterosteus aculeatus – Three-spined stickleback
- Gasterosteus ductor – Pilot fish
- Gasterosteus occidentalis
- Gasterosteus ovatus – Trachinotus ovatus
- Gasterosteus pungitius – Ninespine stickleback
- Gasterosteus volitans – Red lionfish
- Gasterosteus spinachia – Spinachia spinachia
- Gasterosteus spinarella – Flying gurnard

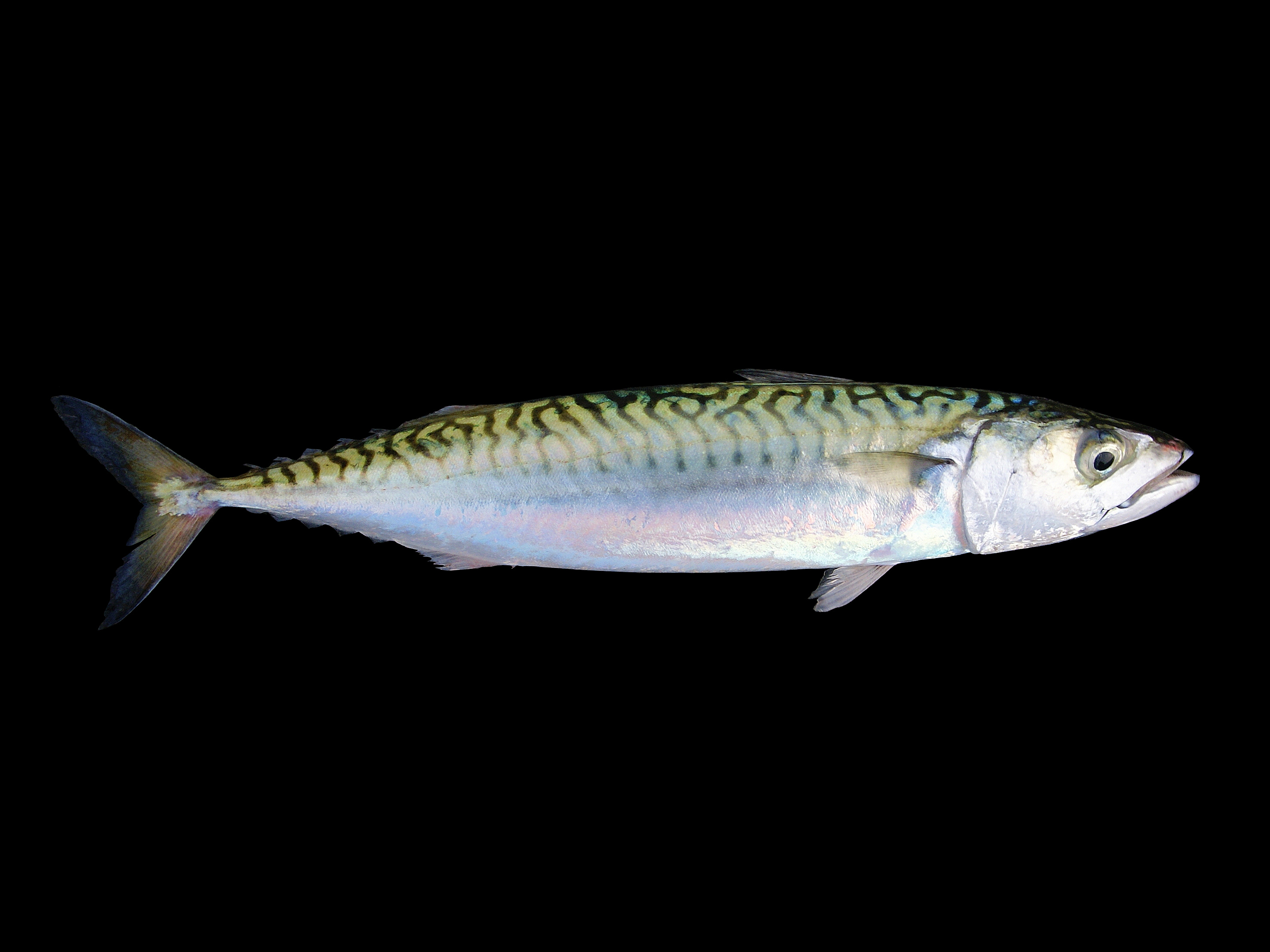
The Atlantic mackerel was named Scomber scombrus in 1758.

Scomber (Mackerel & Tuna)

- Scomber scombrus – Atlantic mackerel
- Scomber pelamis – Skipjack tuna
- Scomber thynnus – Atlantic bluefin tuna
- Scomber cordyla – Torpedo scad
- Scomber glaucus – Trachinotus ovatus
- Scomber trachurus – Atlantic horse mackerel
- Scomber amia – Lichia amia
- Scomber pelagicus – Dolphinfish

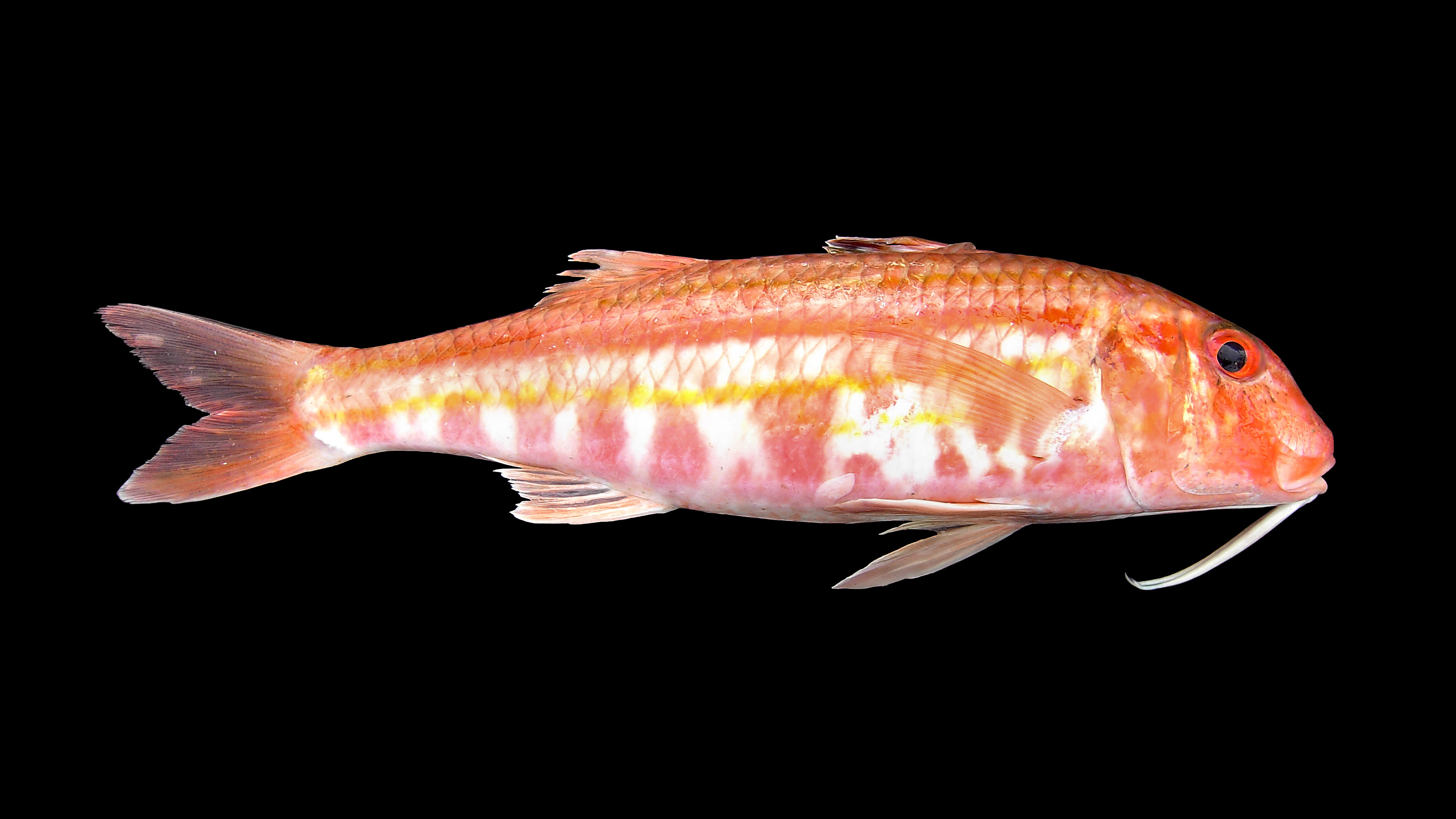
The red mullet was named Mullus surmuletus in 1758.

Mullus (Goatfishes)

- Mullus barbatus – Bluntsnouted mullet
- Mullus surmuletus – Red mullet
- Mullus imberbis – Cardinalfish

Trigla (Sea robins)

- Trigla cataphracta – Peristedion cataphractum
- Trigla lyra – Piper gurnard
- Trigla gurnardus – Grey gurnard
- Trigla cuculus – East Atlantic red gurnard
- Trigla lucerna – Tub Gurnard
- Trigla hirundo – Chelidonichthys gabonensis
- Trigla asiatica
- Trigla volitans – Flying gurnard

== Abdominales ==
Cobitis (Loaches)

- Cobitis anableps – Four-eyed fish
- Cobitis barbatula – Stone loach
- Cobitis taenia – Spined loach
- Cobitis fossilis – European weatherfish

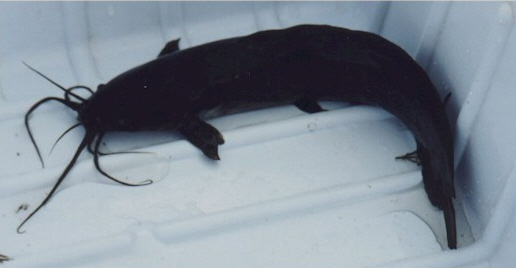
The walking catfish was named Silurus batrachus in 1758.

Silurus (Catfishes)

- Silurus asotus – Amur catfish
- Silurus glanis – Wels catfish
- Silurus aspredo – Aspredo aspredo
- Silurus mystus – African Butter catfish
- Silurus anguillaris – Mudfish
- Silurus batrachus – Walking catfish
- Silurus undecimalis
- Silurus militaris – Osteogeneiosus militaris
- Silurus catus – White catfish
- Silurus clarias – Synodontis clarias
- Silurus ascita
- Silurus costatus – Platydoras costatus
- Silurus callichthys – Armored catfish
- Silurus cataphractus – Acanthodoras cataphractus

Loricaria (Suckermouth Catfishes)

- Loricaria cataphracta – Suckermouth catfish

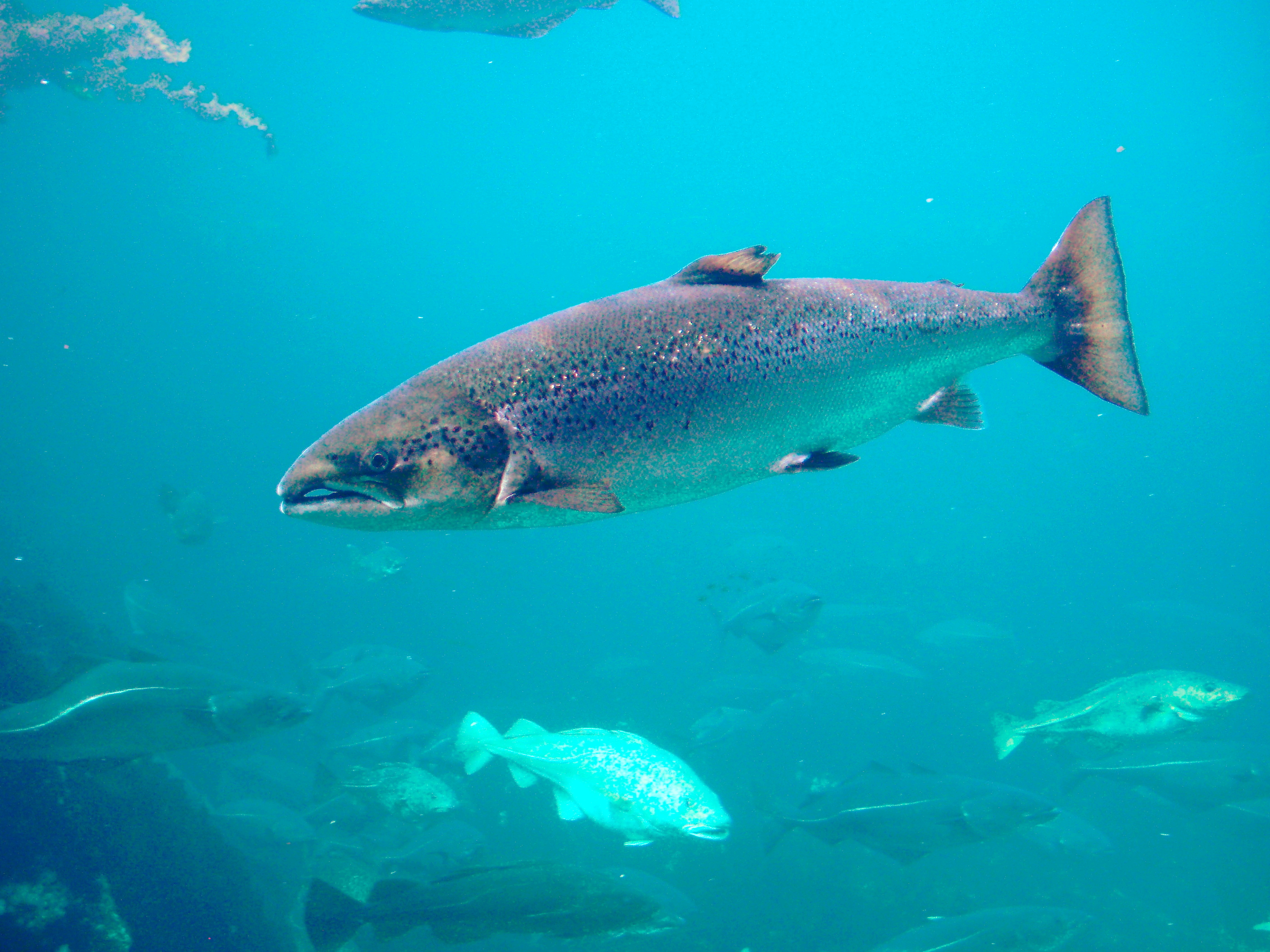
The Atlantic salmon was named Salmo salar in 1758.

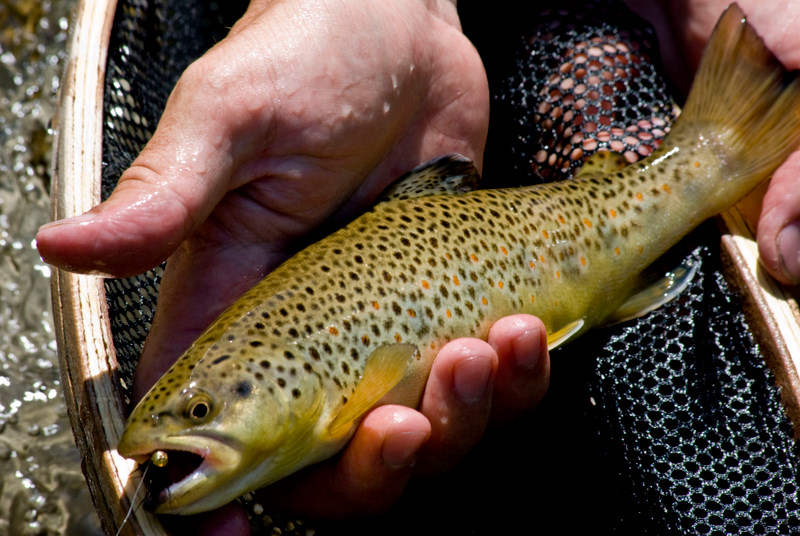
The brown trout was named Salmo eriox, Salmo trutta, Salmo fario & Salmo lacustris in 1758.

Salmo (Salmon, Trout, & kin)

- Salmo salar – Atlantic salmon
- Salmo eriox, Salmo trutta, Salmo fario, & Salmo lacustris – Brown trout
- Salmo hucho – Huchen
- Salmo carpio – Carpione
- Salmo alpinus – Arctic char
- Salmo salvelinus, Salmo salmarinus, & Salmo umbla – Salvelinus umbla
- Salmo saurus – Atlantic lizardfish
- Salmo thymallus – Grayling
- Salmo gibbosus – Charax gibbosus
- Salmo niloticus – nomen dubium
- Salmo pulverulentus – Acestrorhynchus falcatus
- Salmo anostomus – Anostomus anostomus

Osmerus (smelts)

- Osmerus eperlanus – European smelt
- Osmerus bimaculatus – Astyanax bimaculatus

Coregonus (whitefish)

- Coregonus lavaretus – Common whitefish
- Coregonus albula & Coregonus vimba – Vendace
- Coregonus oxyrinchus – Houting
- Coregonus immaculatus – Curimata cyprinoides

Fistularia (Cornetfishes)

- Fistularia tabacaria – Bluespotted cornetfish

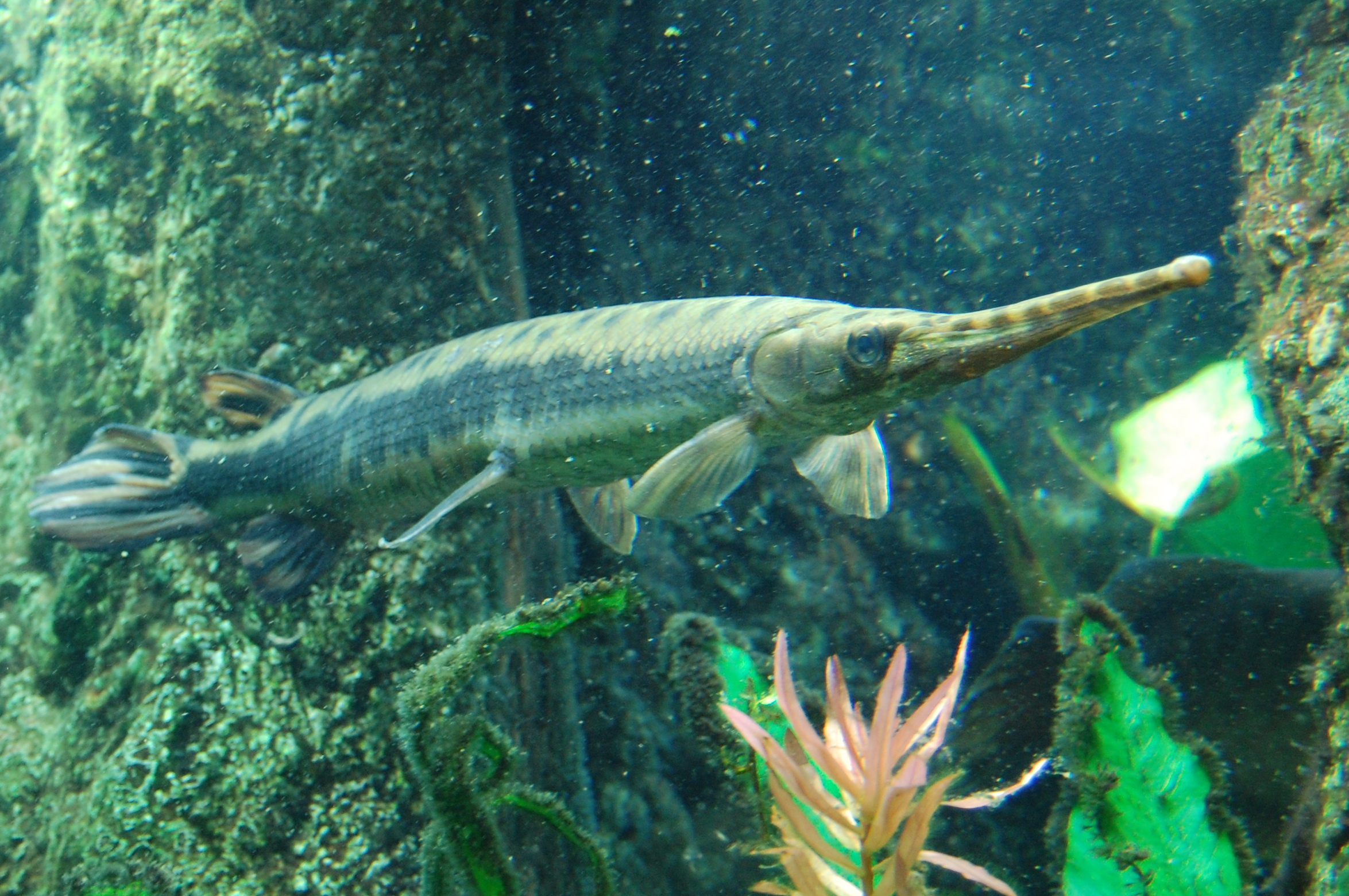
The longnose gar was named Esox osseus in 1758.

Esox (Pike, Gar, and kin)

- Esox sphyraena – European barracuda
- Esox osseus – Longnose gar
- Esox vulpes – Bonefish
- Esox synodus – Diamond lizardfish
- Esox lucius – Northern pike
- Esox hepsetus – Anchoa hepsetus
- Esox bellone
- Esox brasiliensis – Ballyhoo
- Esox gymnocephalus – unknown

Argentina (Herring smelts)

- Argentina sphyraena – European argentine

Atherina (Silversides)

- Atherina hepsetus – Mediterranean sand smelt

Mugil (Mullet)

- Mugil cephalus – Flathead mullet

Exocoetus (Flying fishes)

- Exocoetus volitans – Tropical two-winged flying fish

Polynemus (Threadfins)

- Polynemus quinquarius – Pentanemus quinquarius
- Polynemus virginicus – Polydactylus virginicus
- Polynemus paradiseus – Paradise threadfin

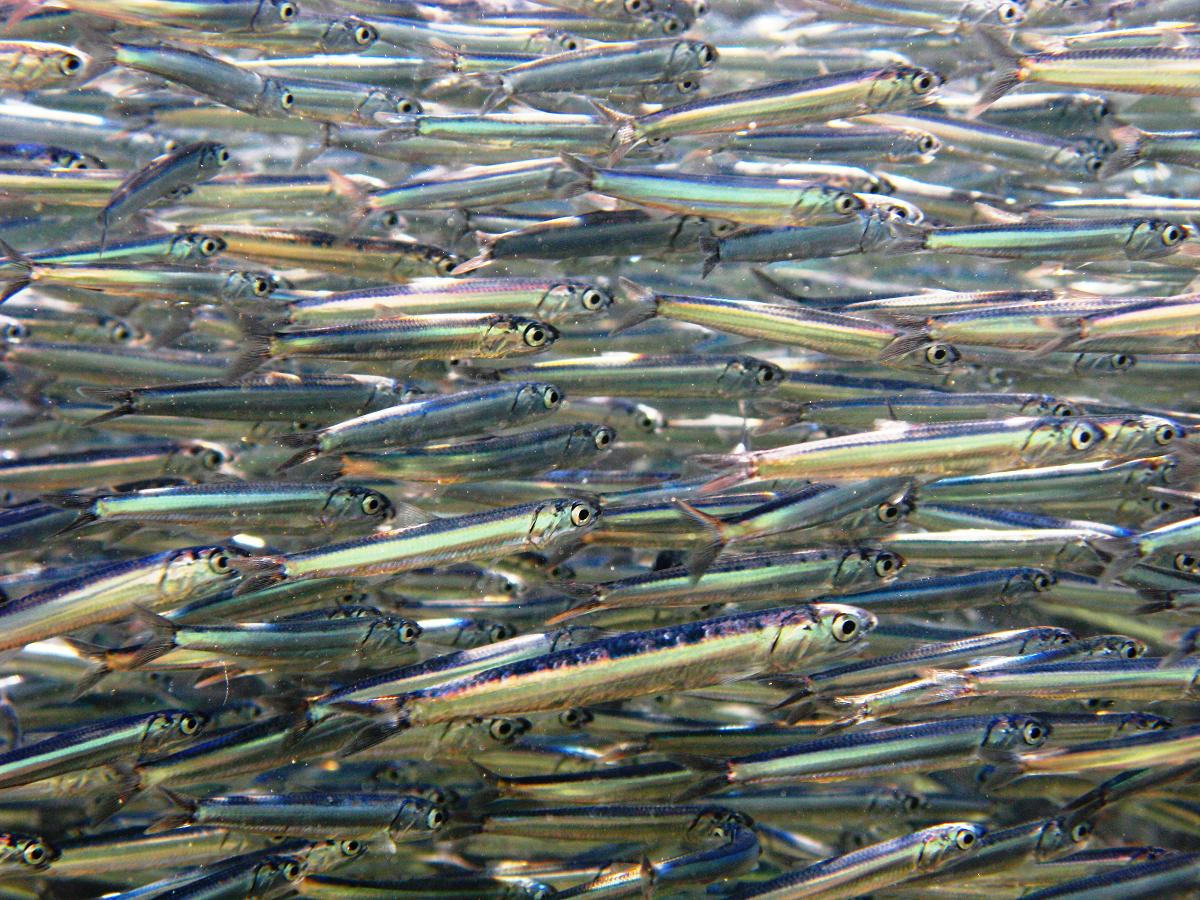
The European anchovy was named Clupea encrasicolus in 1758.

Clupea (Herring, Hatchetfishes, & kin)

- Clupea harengus – Atlantic herring
- Clupea sprattus – European sprat
- Clupea alosa – Allis shad
- Clupea encrasicolus – European anchovy
- Clupea thrissa – Clupanodon thrissa
- Clupea sima
- Clupea sternicla – Common hatchetfish
- Clupea mystus – Coilia mystus
- Clupea tropica
- Clupea sinensis – Tenualosa reevesii

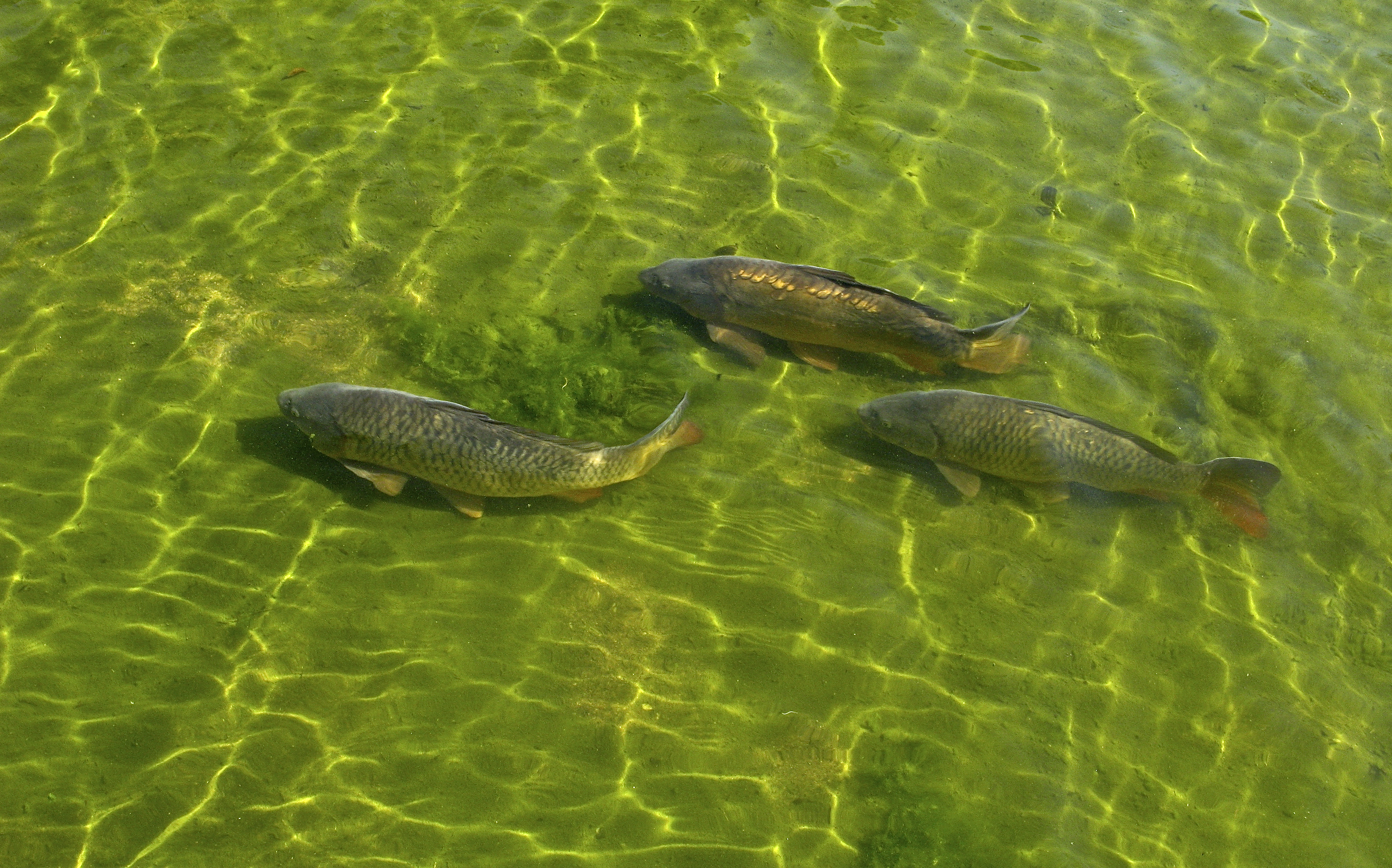
The common carp was named Cyprinus carpio in 1758.

Cyprinus (Carp & kin)

- Cyprinus barbus – Common barbel
- Cyprinus carpio – Common carp
- Cyprinus gobio – Gobio gobio
- Cyprinus americanus – Menticirrhus americanus
- Cyprinus carassius – Crucian carp
- Cyprinus tinca – Tench
- Cyprinus cephalus – European chub
- Cyprinus auratus – Goldfish
- Cyprinus niloticus
- Cyprinus phoxinus & Cyprinus aphya – Common minnow
- Cyprinus leuciscus, Cyprinus dobula, & Cyprinus grislagine – Common dace
- Cyprinus idbarus, Cyprinus idus, Cyprinus orfus, & Cyprinus jeses – Ide
- Cyprinus rutilus – Common roach
- Cyprinus erythrophthalmus – Common rudd
- Cyprinus nasus – Common Nase
- Cyprinus aspius – Asp
- Cyprinus alburnus – Common Bleak
- Cyprinus vimba – Vimba bream
- Cyprinus dentex – Alestes dentex
- Cyprinus brama – Carp bream
- Cyprinus cultratus – Ziege
- Cyprinus bjoerkna – Silver bream
- Cyprinus farenus & Cyprinus ballerus – Blue bream

== Branchiostegi ==
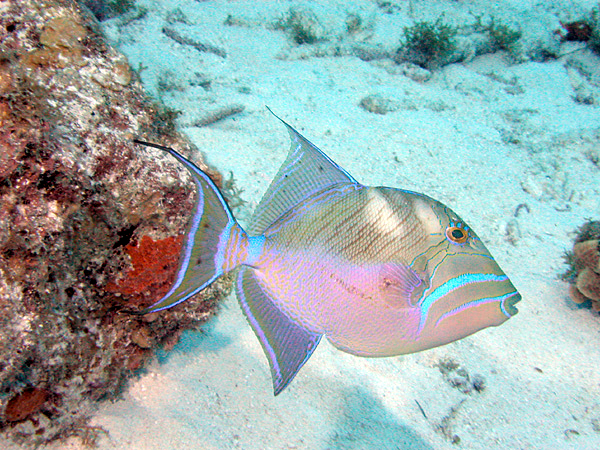
The queen triggerfish was named Balistes vetula in 1758.

Mormyrus (Elephantfishes)

- Mormyrus cyprinoides – Marcusenius cyprinoides
- Mormyrus anguilloides – Cornish jack
- Mormyrus caschive – Mormyrus caschive

Balistes (Triggerfishes)

- Balistes monoceros – Unicorn leatherjacket
- Balistes tomentosus – Acreichthys tomentosus
- Balistes papillosus – Papillose filefish
- Balistes verrucosus – Rhinecanthus verrucosus
- Balistes aculeatus – Lagoon triggerfish
- Balistes vetula – Queen triggerfish
- Balistes ringens – Xanthichthys ringens
- Balistes scolopax – Longspine snipefish

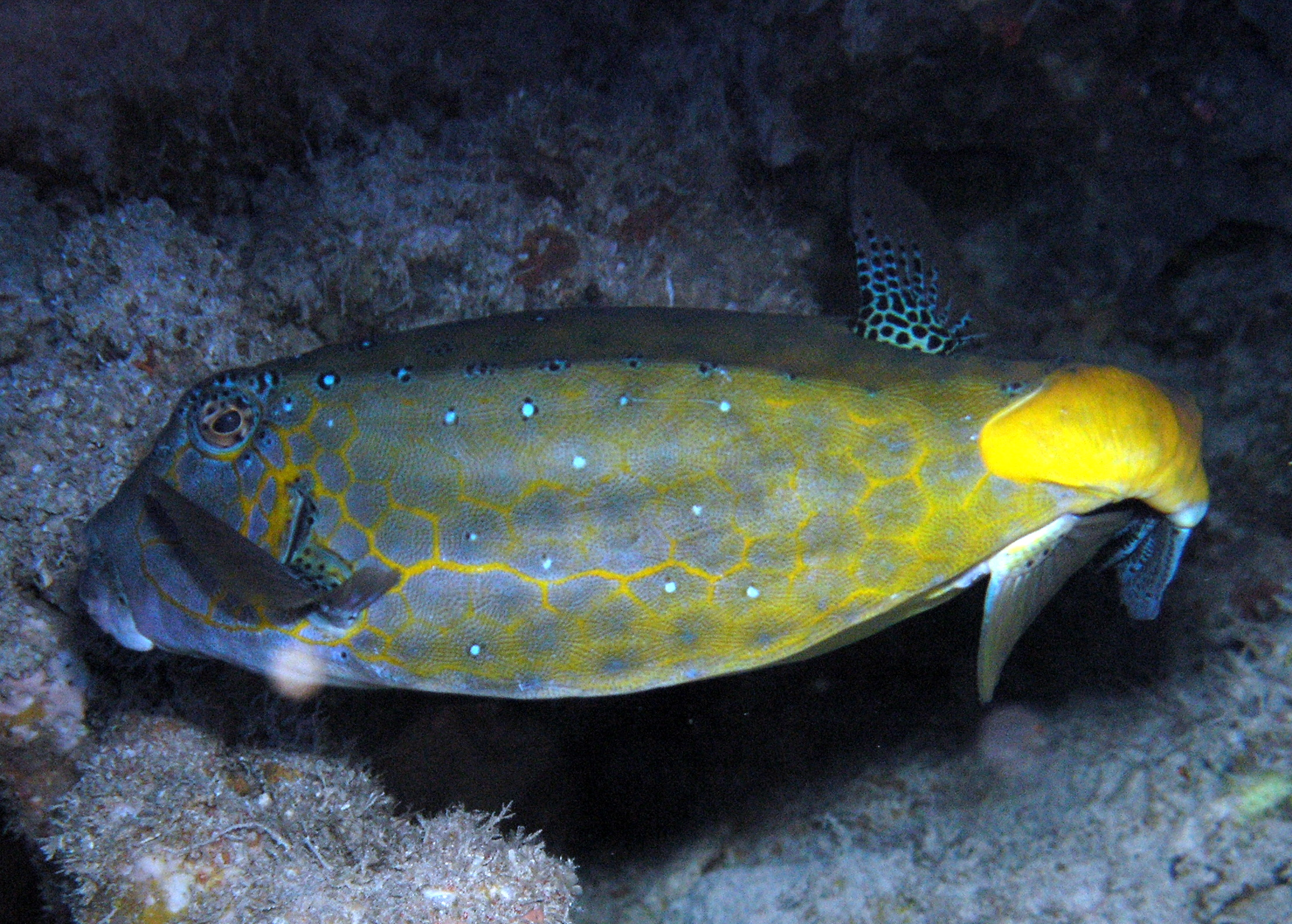
The yellow boxfish was named Ostracion tuberculatus & Ostracion cubicus in 1758.

Ostracion (Boxfishes & Cowfishes)

- Ostracion triqueter – Lactophrys triqueter
- Ostracion trigonus – Lactophrys trigonus
- Ostracion bicaudalis – Spotted trunkfish
- Ostracion tricornis & Ostracion quadricornis – scrawled cowfish
- Ostracion cornutus – longhorn cowfish
- Ostracion tuberculatus & Ostracion cubicus – yellow boxfish
- Ostracion gibbosus – Tetrosomus gibbosus

Tetraodon (Pufferfishes & Sunfishes)

- Tetraodon testudineus – Checkered puffer
- Tetraodon lagocephalus – Oceanic puffer
- Tetraodon lineatus – Fahaka pufferfish
- Tetraodon ocellatus – Takifugu ocellatus
- Tetraodon hispidus – White-spotted puffer
- Tetraodon mola – Ocean sunfish

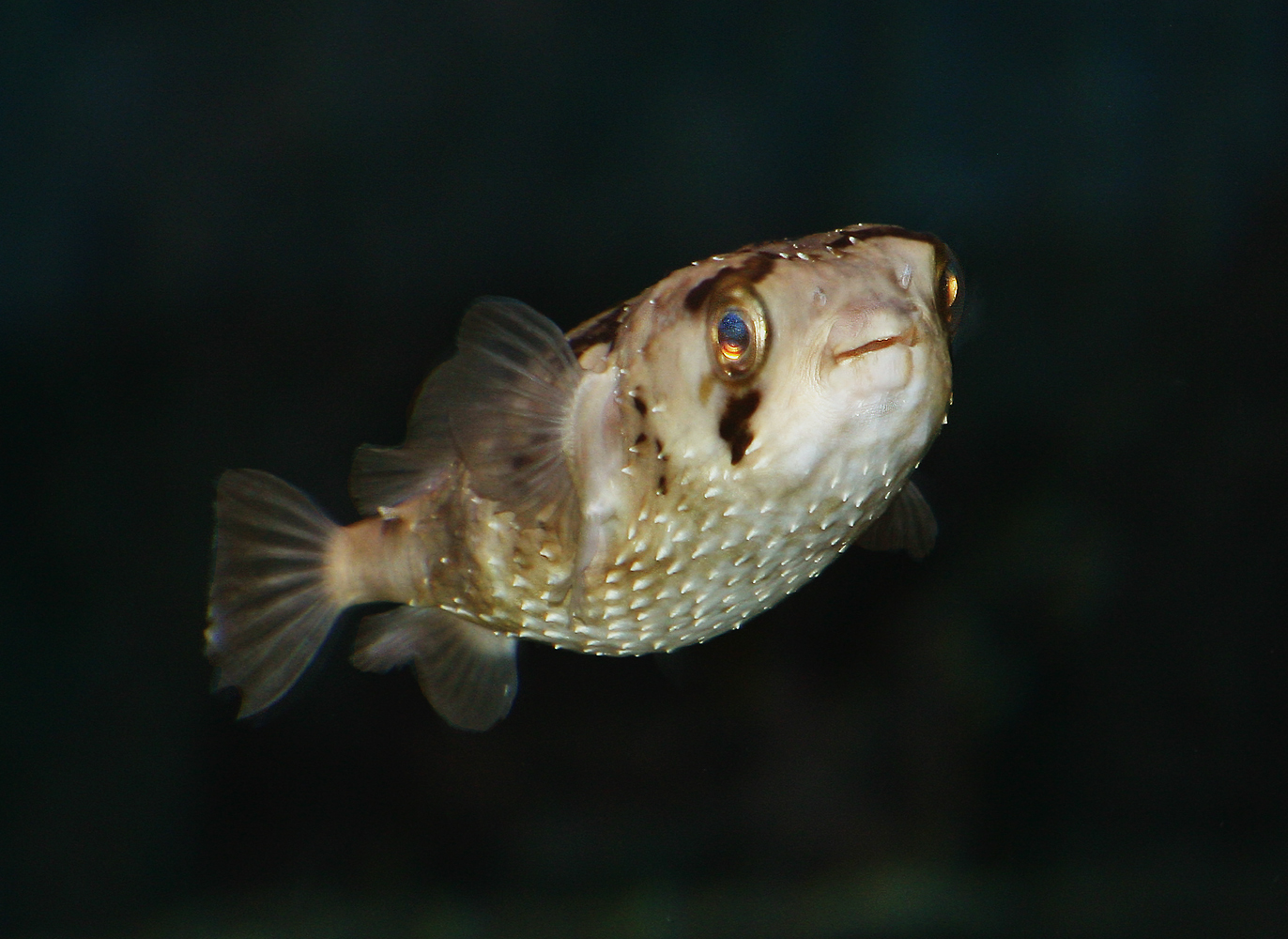
The long-spine porcupinefish was named Diodon holocanthus in 1758.

Diodon (Porcupinefishes)

- Diodon atringa – Chilomycterus atringa
- Diodon reticulatus & Diodon echinatus – Chilomycterus reticulatus
- Diodon spinosus – Chilomycterus spinosus
- Diodon hystrix – Spot-fin porcupinefish
- Diodon holocanthus – Long-spine porcupinefish
- Diodon raninus

Centriscus (Shrimpfishes)

- Centriscus scutatus – Grooved shrimpfish

Syngnathus (Pipefishes & Seahorses)

- Syngnathus typhle – Broad-nosed pipefish
- Syngnathus acus – Common pipefish
- Syngnathus pelagicus – Pelagic pipefish
- Syngnathus aequoreus – Entelurus aequoreus
- Syngnathus ophidion & Sygnathus barbarus – Nerophis ophidion
- Syngnathus hippocampus – Short-snouted seahorse

Pegasus (Seamoths)

- Pegasus volitans – Longtail seamoth
