= Green wrasse (disambiguation) =

Green wrasse may refer to these fish:

- Labrus viridis — widespread in eastern part of the northern Atlantic
- Choerodon schoenleinii — blackspot tuskfish, a wrasse found in coral reefs in the South China Sea and Southeast Asia including Australia
- Halichoeres solorensis
- Notolabrus inscriptus — widespread in Australia
