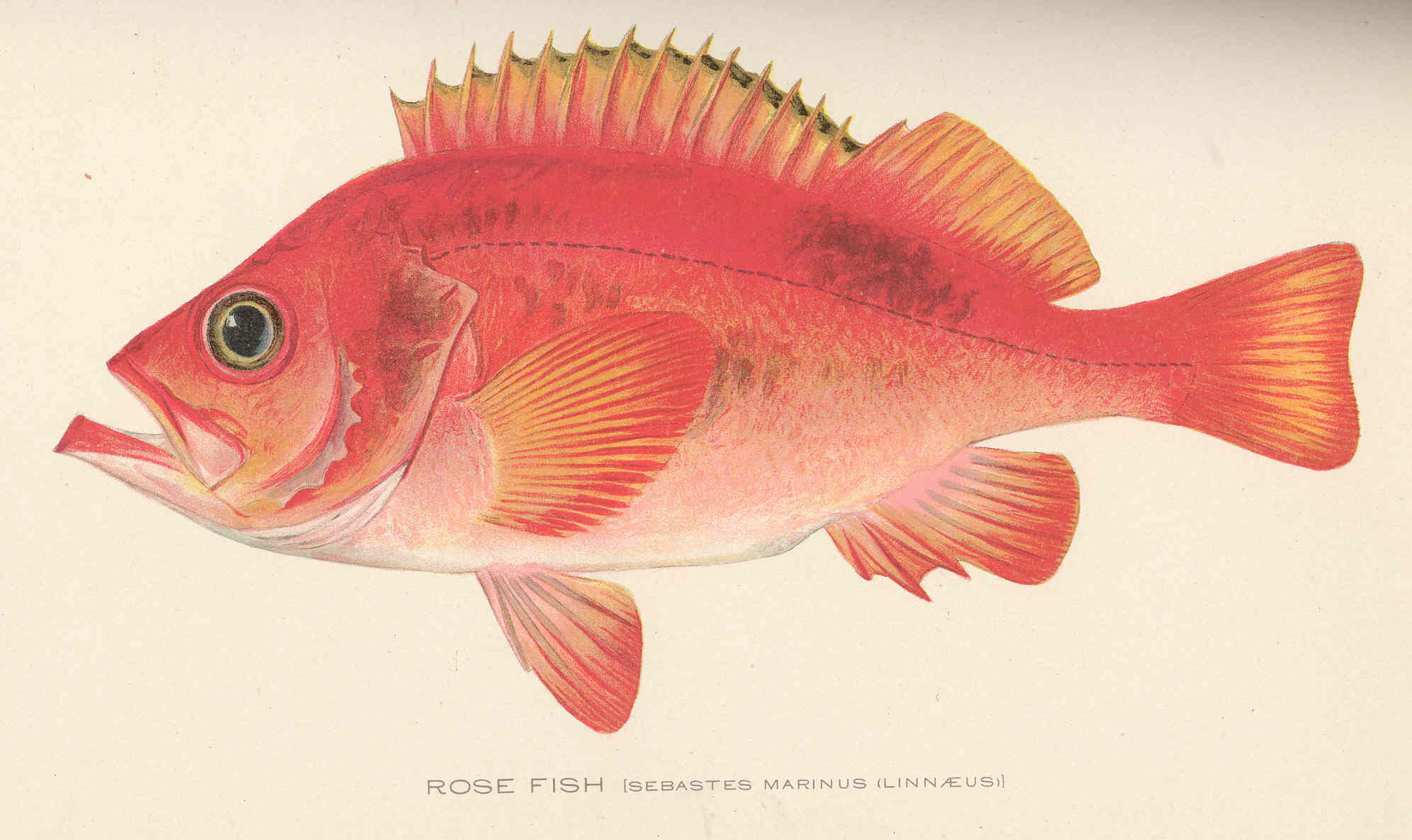

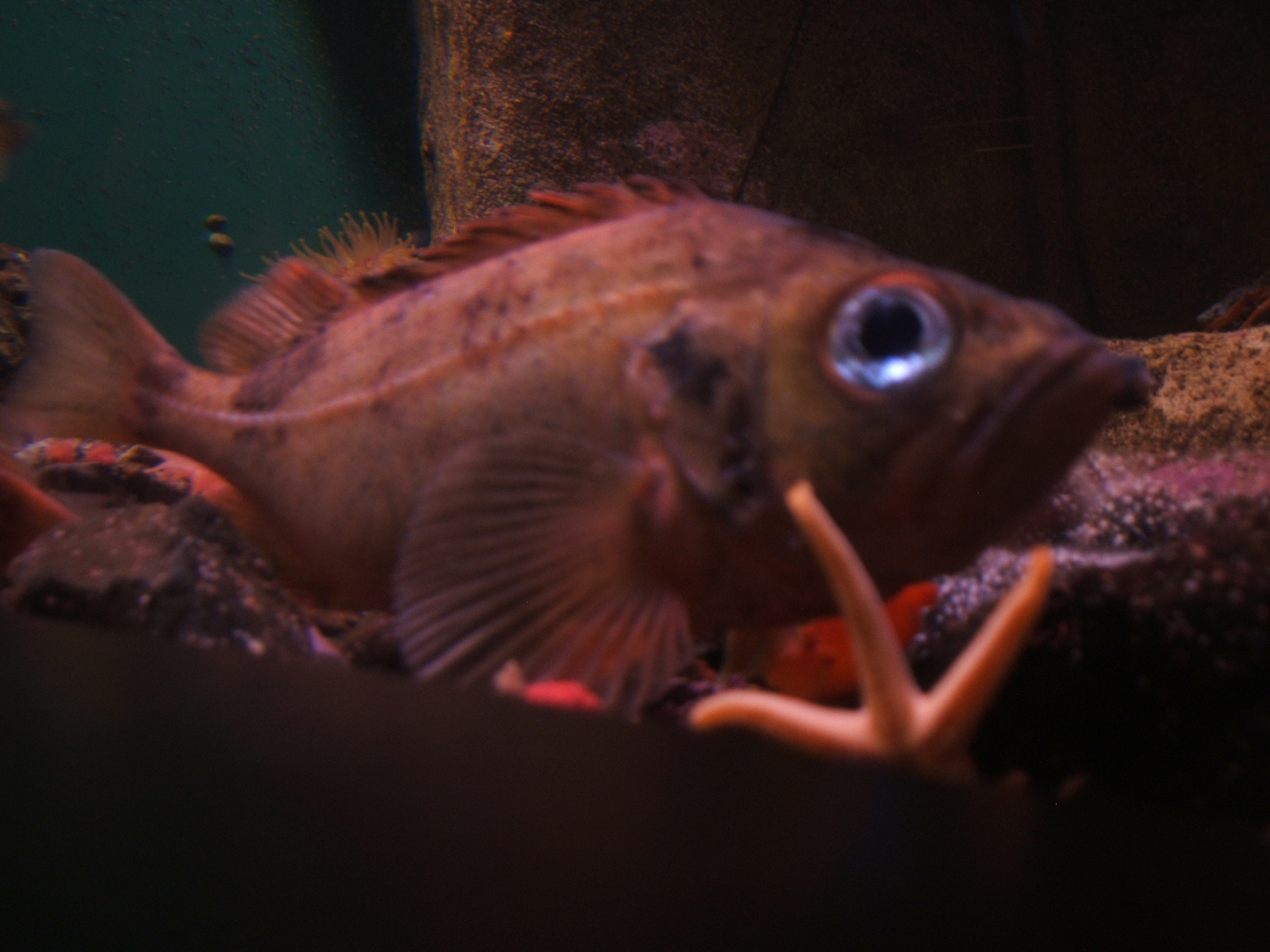

Conservation status
- Least Concern (IUCN 3.1)

Scientific classification
- Kingdom: Animalia
- Phylum: Chordata
- Class: Actinopterygii
- Division: Teleostei
- Order: Perciformes
- Family: Scorpaenidae
- Genus: Sebastes
- Species: S. norvegicus

Binomial name
- Sebastes norvegicus (Ascanius, 1772)

Synonyms
- Perca norvegica Ascanius, 1772; Perca norwegica Walbaum, 1792; Sebastes septentrionalis Gaimard, 1851; Sebastes heltzeni Collett, 1879

= Sebastes norvegicus =

Species of fish

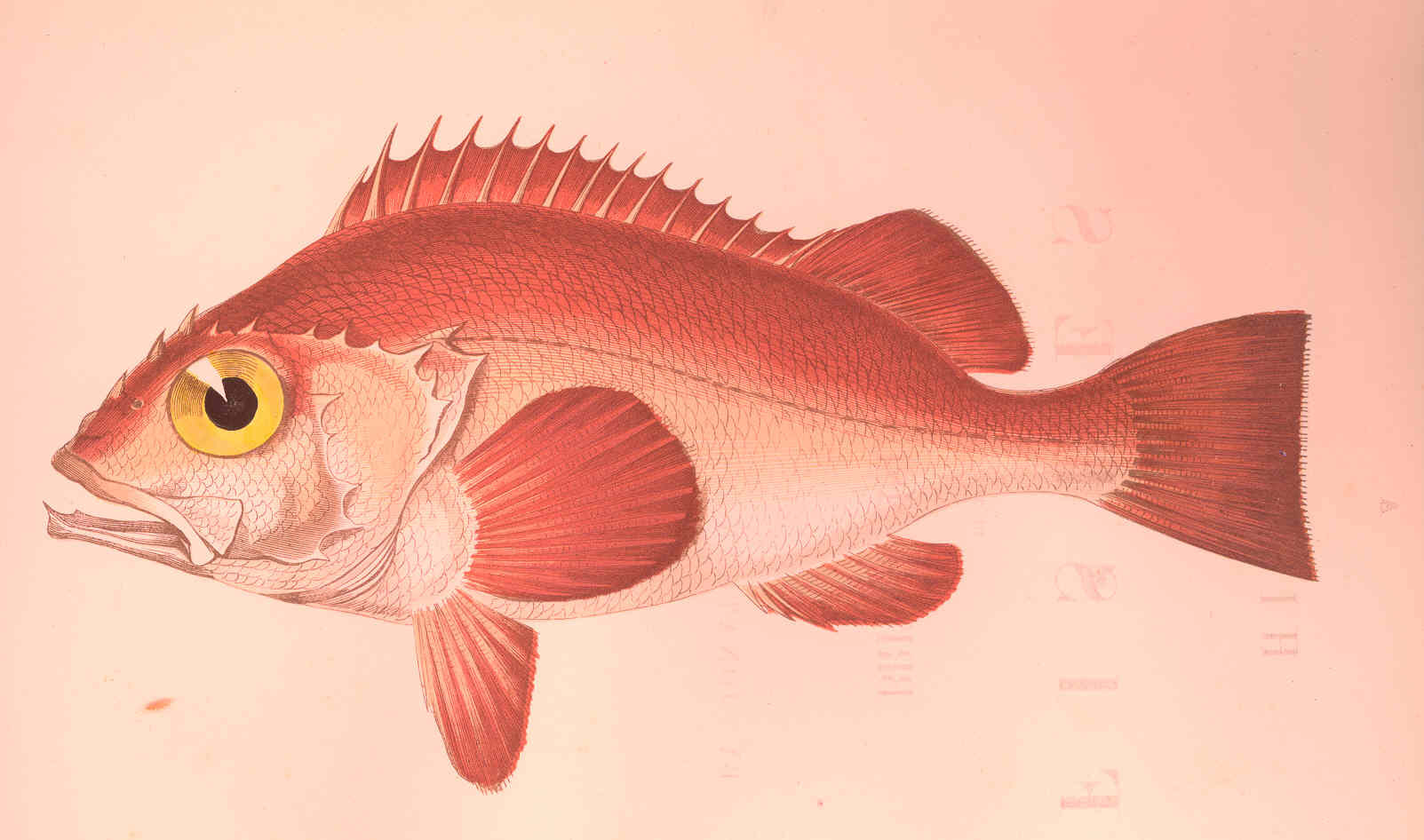
Illustration of a rock fish

Sebastes norvegicus, the rose fish, rock fish, ocean perch, Atlantic redfish, Norway haddock, golden redfish, pinkbelly rosefish, Norway seaperch, Scottish seaperch or bergylt, is a species of marine ray-finned fish belonging to the subfamily Sebastinae, the rockfishes, part of the family Scorpaenidae. It is found in the North Atlantic Ocean. It is a medium-sized, slow-growing, late-maturing fish and the subject of a fishery.

== Taxonomy ==
Sebastes norvegicus was first formally described as Perca norvegicus in 1772 by the Norwegian biologist Peter Ascanius with the type locality given as Norway. The specific name refers to the type locality. In the past, the scientific name Sebastes marinus was frequently used, but this is actually a synonym of Serranus scriba. S. norvegicus was designated as the type species of the genus Sebastes by Pieter Bleeker in 1876. This taxon may be a species complex containing at least 2 new cryptic species which had not been named as of 2017.

== Description ==
Sebastes norvegicus is a large and stocky bodied species of rockfish. Like other scorpionfishes this species has comparatively large fins which have long spines and rays. The caudal fin is weakly truncate while the anal, pectoral and pelvic fins are rounded and the dorsal fin is continuous. The dorsal fin contains between 14 and 16, typically 15, robust spines and 13 to 16, normally 14 or 15, soft rays, while anal fin has 3 spines and about 8 soft rays. There are 1 or 2 spined points above the jaw on the preorbital bone but the ridge below the eye has no spines and is rather weakly defined. There are 5 spines on the preoperculum which are all about the same length. There are spines on the supracleithrum and there are 2 spines on the operculum, the lower one being normally directed downwards and slightly towards the rear, infrequently downwards and forwards. There are also nasal, preocular, supraocular, post-ocular and parietal spines. There is normally no knob on the symphysis of the lower jaw, but if there is on it is a rounded protuberance. The golden redfish reaches a maximum total length of 100 cm (39 in), although 45 cm (18 in) is more typical, and a maximum published weight of 15 kg (33 lb). The overall colour is vivid red with a dusky patch to the rear of the operculum.

== Distribution and habitat ==
Sebastes norvegicus is found from the Kattegat and the northern part of the North Sea north along the coast of Norway to the western coast of Spitsbergen, the southern part of the Barents Sea and east as far as the Kanin Banks and Novaya Zemlya shoals and it is rare in the White Sea. It is a common species off Iceland and off southeastern Greenland. Elsewhere, along western coast of Greenland. In the western Atlantic it is found as far south as Flemish Cap, the Grand Banks and the Gulf of St. Lawrence. Juveniles can be found in fjords, bays and inshore waters, while the adults are found off the coast at depths between 100 and 1,000 m (330 and 3,280 ft). Fish living in deeper waters are larger than those living in shallow offshore waters.

== Biology ==
Sebastes norvegicus is predatory and in the summer its diet is dominated by krill, in the autumn and winter by the Atlantic herring (Clupea harengus) and in spring by capelin (Mallotus villosus), Atlantic herrings, krill and ctenophores in spring. It is a gregarious species at all stages of its life history which grows slowly and is long lived. They attain sexual maturity at total lengths between 38 and 41 cm (15 and 16 in). It is an ovoviviparous species, like other rockfishes. The males inseminate the females in August–September in the Barents Sea and between October and January in waters off Iceland and Greenland but the oocytyes are not fertilised until February and March with larvae being extruded from April to June or even as late as August.

== Fishery ==
One of the main fishing areas of the rock fish is the Irminger Sea between Iceland and southeastern Greenland. While annual catches during the 1980s and 90s were less than 20 kilotons, this has increased dramatically since 1999, to between 40 and 60 kilotons. In 2000, almost 80 kilotons were caught. Since then, annual catch has declined back to between 40 and 60 kilotons. The meat of this fish is almost always sold filleted, often frozen.

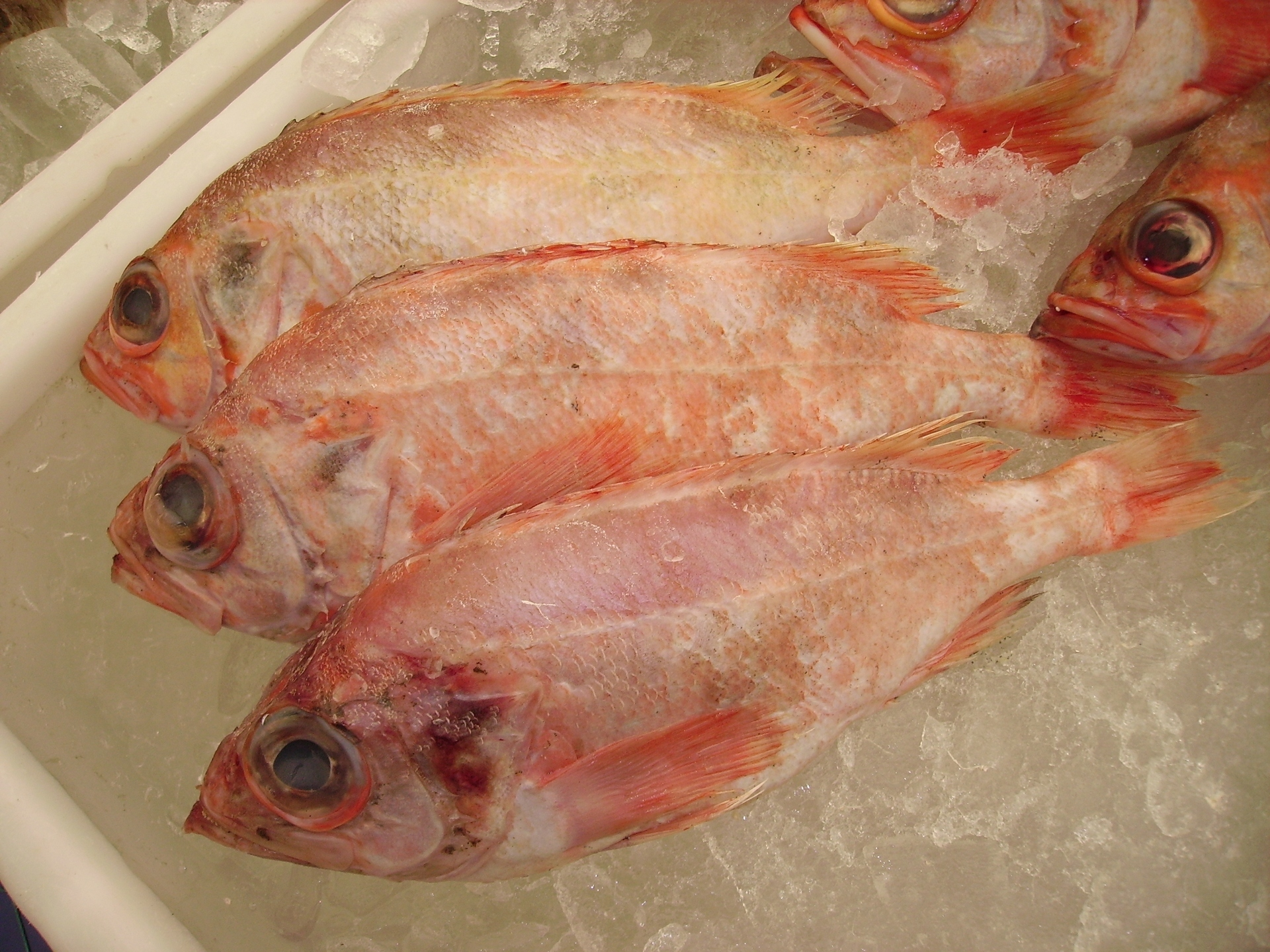
Redfish on ice

Since the mid-2000s, populations have been considered severely overfished. According to Greenpeace International, some populations are no longer reproducing sufficiently, and their chances of recovery are slim. In 2010, Greenpeace added the rock fish to its seafood red list. It is also on WWF's list of fish species to avoid, unless the fishery is certified by MSC.

In Canada's Gulf of St. Lawrence, the fish was reported to be enjoying a "booming population" in 2021, leading Atlantic provinces to compete for shares of the fishery, estimated to be able to reach 50,000 tonnes of catch annually.

== In culture ==
Sebastes norvegicus appeared on a 15+5 pfennig semi-postal stamp of West Germany in 1964.
