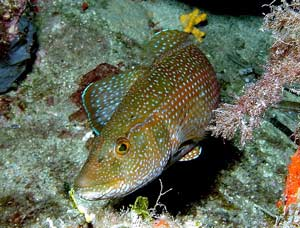

Conservation status
- Vulnerable (IUCN 3.1)

Scientific classification
- Kingdom: Animalia
- Phylum: Chordata
- Class: Actinopterygii
- Order: Labriformes
- Family: Labridae
- Genus: Labrus
- Species: L. viridis

Binomial name
- Labrus viridis Linnaeus, 1758

Synonyms
- Labrus luscus Linnaeus, 1758; Labrus turdus Linnaeus, 1758; Labrus prasostictes Pallas, 1814; Labrus viridis prasostictes Pallas, 1814

= Labrus viridis =

Species of fish

Labrus viridis (the green wrasse) is a species of wrasse native to the eastern Atlantic Ocean from Portugal to Morocco, as well as through the Mediterranean Sea to the Black Sea. This species is found around rocky reefs amongst the rocks or in eelgrass beds. It can reach 47 cm (19 in) in standard length, though most do not exceed 37.5 cm (15 in). It is one of several species called green wrasse.

== Description ==
The green wrasse grows to about 35 cm (14 in) and is a plump fish with a moderately large head. The eyes are large and the nostrils each have a double opening. The lips are thick and the mouth fairly small, with numerous large teeth. The back is slightly humped, and the belly is slightly convex. The skin is covered with large scales and is smooth and soft, being covered with mucus. The dorsal fin has 18 spines and 12 soft rays. The pectoral fins are large and the caudal fin undivided. In most individuals the colour is bright green with a blue line running along the flank, but some individuals are almost entirely black while others are spotted.

== Distribution ==
The green wrasse is native to the eastern Atlantic Ocean between Portugal and Morocco, and most of the Mediterranean Sea, although it seems to be absent from the waters of Syria, Lebanon and Israel. It is also present in the western Black Sea. Its depth range is down to about 50 m (160 ft). Its typical habitat is in the vicinity of rocky reefs, especially those well-covered with seaweed, and seagrass meadows.

== Ecology ==
The green wrasse can occur in small groups but is more often found singly or in pairs. It feeds on small fish, crustaceans and other invertebrates. It is probably a protogynous hermaphrodite, that is it starts life as a female but at some stage changes its sex to male. This means that male fish are normally larger than females. A breeding pair of fish will prepare a dish-shaped nest among vegetation, and the adhesive eggs laid by the female are guarded and cared for by the male. The age of attaining maturity is probably three years, and the fish may live for twenty years.

== Status ==
This fish is generally uncommon. It is caught for food, including spearfishing for sport, and the total population is in decline, especially in the western Mediterranean, with fishing being a threat in all parts of its range. Additionally, its habitat is being degraded as seagrass meadows disappear, so the International Union for Conservation of Nature has assessed its conservation status as "vulnerable".
