= Cephalopholis fulva =

Coney
- Red phase, in Brazil

Conservation status
- Least Concern (IUCN 3.1)

Scientific classification
- Kingdom: Animalia
- Phylum: Chordata
- Class: Actinopterygii
- Division: Teleostei
- Order: Perciformes
- Family: Epinephelidae
- Genus: Cephalopholis
- Species: C. fulva

Binomial name
- Cephalopholis fulva (Linnaeus, 1758)

Synonyms
- List: Labrus fulvus Linnaeus, 1758; Epinephelus fulva (Linnaeus, 1758); Epinephelus fulvus (Linnaeus, 1758); Perca punctata Linnaeus, 1758; Holocentrus auratus Bloch, 1790; Bodianus guativere Bloch & Schneider, 1801; Gymnocephalus ruber Bloch & Schneider, 1801; Serranus ouatalibi Valenciennes, 1828; Serranus carauna Valenciennes, 1828

Species of fish

Cephalopholis fulva, the coney or the butterfish, is a species of marine ray-finned fish, a grouper from the subfamily Epinephelinae which is in the family Serranidae which also includes the anthias and sea basses. It is found in the western Atlantic. It is associated with reefs and is a quarry species for commercial and recreational fisheries. It can also be found in the aquarium trade.

== Distribution ==
Cephalopholis fulva occurs in the western Atlantic Ocean from South Carolina and Bermuda to the Bahamas and into the Gulf of Mexico where it is found in Florida from the Florida Keys as far north as Cedar Key, Florida and the Flower Garden Banks. In the west of the Gulf of Mexico it is found from Tuxpan in Mexico south along the coast of the northern Yucatan Peninsula and off northwestern Cuba. It also occurs throughout the Caribbean Sea and along the northern coast of South America, with a gap in the region of the Amazon Delta, to southern Brazil, It is also found around the Fernando de Noronha Archipelago, St. Paul's Rocks and Trindade Island.

== Description ==
Cephalopholis fulva

Cephalopholis fulva has an oblong-shaped, robust body with a snout that is longer than the diameter of the eye. It has large and round eyes, sitting above a pointed snout. The dorsal profile is flat to convex between the eyes and the posterior end of the upper mandible is exposed when the mouth is closed forming a bony knob. The closed mouth reaches beyond the rear margin of the eye. The majority of the teeth are movable. It has a rounded preopercle which is finely serrated but does not have any spines or notches. There are 46-54 scales in the lateral line. The dorsal fin has 9 spines and 14-16 soft rays while the anal fin has 3 spines and 9 soft rays. There are deep notches between the spines in the dorsal fin. The caudal fin is convex with angles at the corners. The maximum recorded total length recorded is 44 centimetres (17 in).

Red phase

Bicolour phase

Xanthic phase

Bicoloured phase, in Brazil
Red phase, in Quintana Roo, Mexico

There are three colour phases in this species: a deep water red phase, a shallow water bicoloured or orange-brown phase and a xanthic or yellow phase which can be found in shallow to deep water. The bicoloured phase is the normal red or brownish orange above a line which runs from the tip of the snout to the rear rays of the dorsal fin and pale below this. In the red and bicoloured morphs, there is a patterning of small blue spots with dark margins which covers the head and body. In the yellow morph these spots are restricted to the head and the anterior part of the body and there are less of them. There are two small black spots on top of caudal peduncle and another two at tip of lower jaw which are present in all three colour morphs. The bicoloured pattern shown by the shallow-water morph seems to be an excitement pattern, and it the fish can switch this pattern on and off in a few seconds. At night they generally adopt a pale colouration with irregular vertical bars and a dark forked line between the eyes. When breeding the male has a horizontal dark brown band which runs from the lower end of base of the pectoral fin to the tip of the caudal fin, a black margin to the soft-rayed part of the dorsal fin, a dark stripe through eye and a white spot on the body near the centre of the base of the dorsal fin. The juveniles are either bicoloured or uniformly gold and have a white spot on the middle of the back and have four black spots on the lower lip and two white spots on upper base of the caudal fin.

== Habitat and biology ==
Showing teeth, in Quintana Roo, Mexico

At Grand Cayman
Xanthic juveniles mimic and associate with damselfish. In Quintana Roo, Mexico.

Cephalopholis fulva are found in coral reefs and clear water, at depths of 1 to 70 metres (3.3 to 229.7 ft), and it may also be found over rocks and coral heads, but only infrequently in the water column. During the day it normally shelters in caves or under ledges. It emerges at night to feed on small fish and crustaceans. They have been known to follow moray eels and snake eels to feed on prey flushed by these predators. The juveniles are mimics of damselfish. The coney is a protogynous hermaphrodite, the females attain sexual maturity at a total length of 16 centimetres (6.3 in) and when they attain a total length of 20 centimetres (7.9 in) they begin to change sex to become males. In Bermuda, females have been reported to be mature at 4 years old. The males are territorial and guard harems of females. Spawning takes place at dusk and occurs over a few days. Small groups made up a male and a number of females take part in the spawning. The breeding season can be as long as ten months off central Brazil although briefer breeding seasons were noted in other areas. On the Abrolhos Bank off Brazil, breeding is from July to August, in Pernambuco it runs from August to October and in Fernando de Noronha spawning occurs July and August, but may extend into September. In Bermuda, spawning has been recorded from May to July. They are reported to have a long larval period which allows for effective and long range dispersal of young. They are thought to grow most rapidly in their early life, attaining around 60% of their possible maximum size in their first year, then the growth rate reduces markedly over the remainder of its life. They have been reported to reach an age of 25 years off Brazil while in tropical areas they grow more quickly and live shorter lives. The oldest fish recorded was from Bermuda and this was 28 years old, Bermudan fish are also the slowest growing.

Xanthic juveniles are known to mimic and associate with damselfish such as the brown chromis (Chromis multilineata). In this example of aggressive mimicry, they feed on fish mistaking them for the comparatively harmless damselfish.

== Utilisation ==
Cephalopholis fulva is a small species which means that it is of little interest to commercial fisheries although it appears in markets throughout the West Indies where it is caught by hook and line and traps. It is commercially fished for in Brazil and is exported. It is also captured as juveniles for the aquarium trade.

== Gallery ==
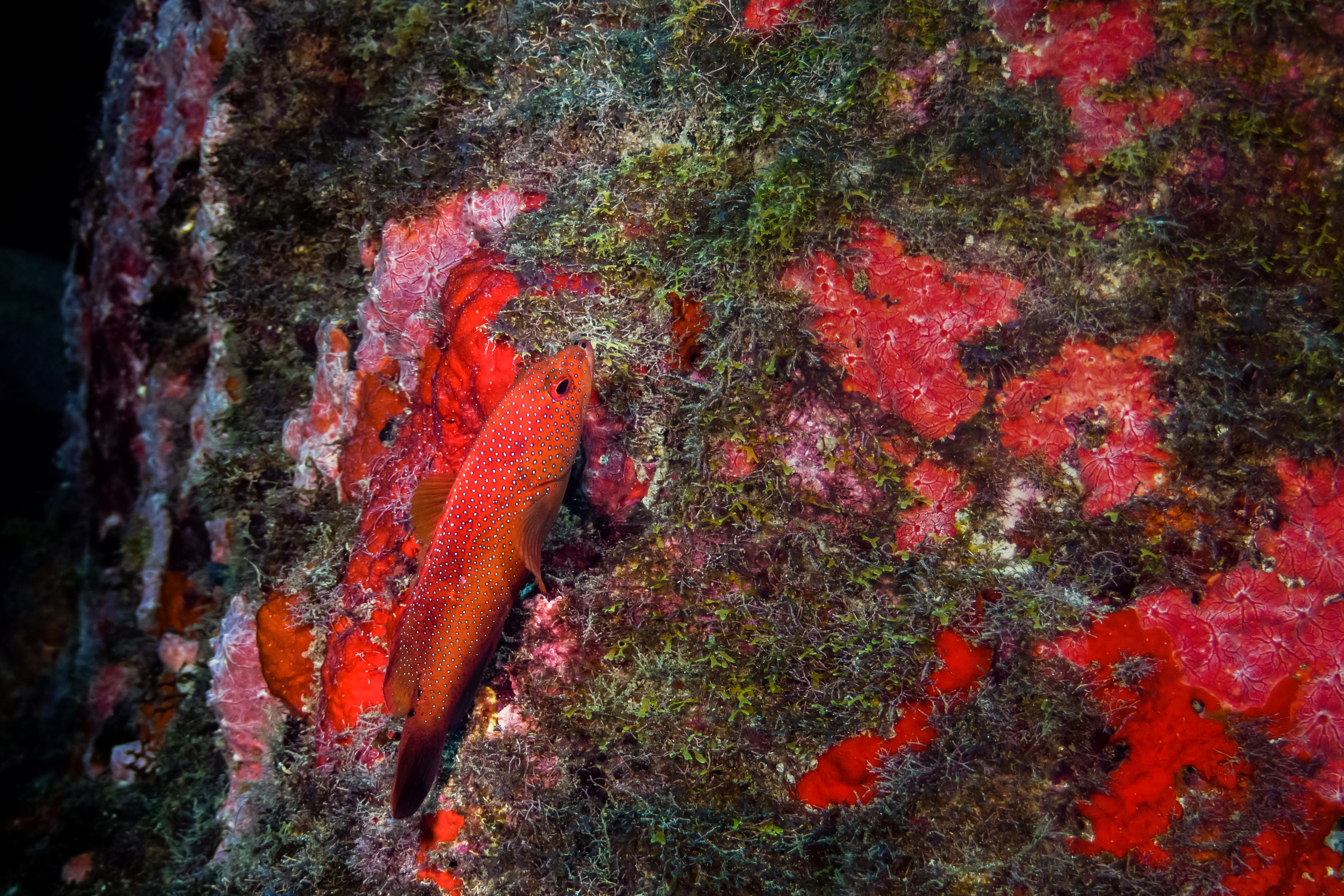
Camouflaged against Monanchora sponges in Fernando de Noronha Marine National Park, Pernambuco, Brazil

In Brazil

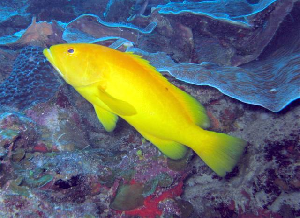
Xanthic phase, in Bonaire

Front view, in Quintana Roo, Mexico
