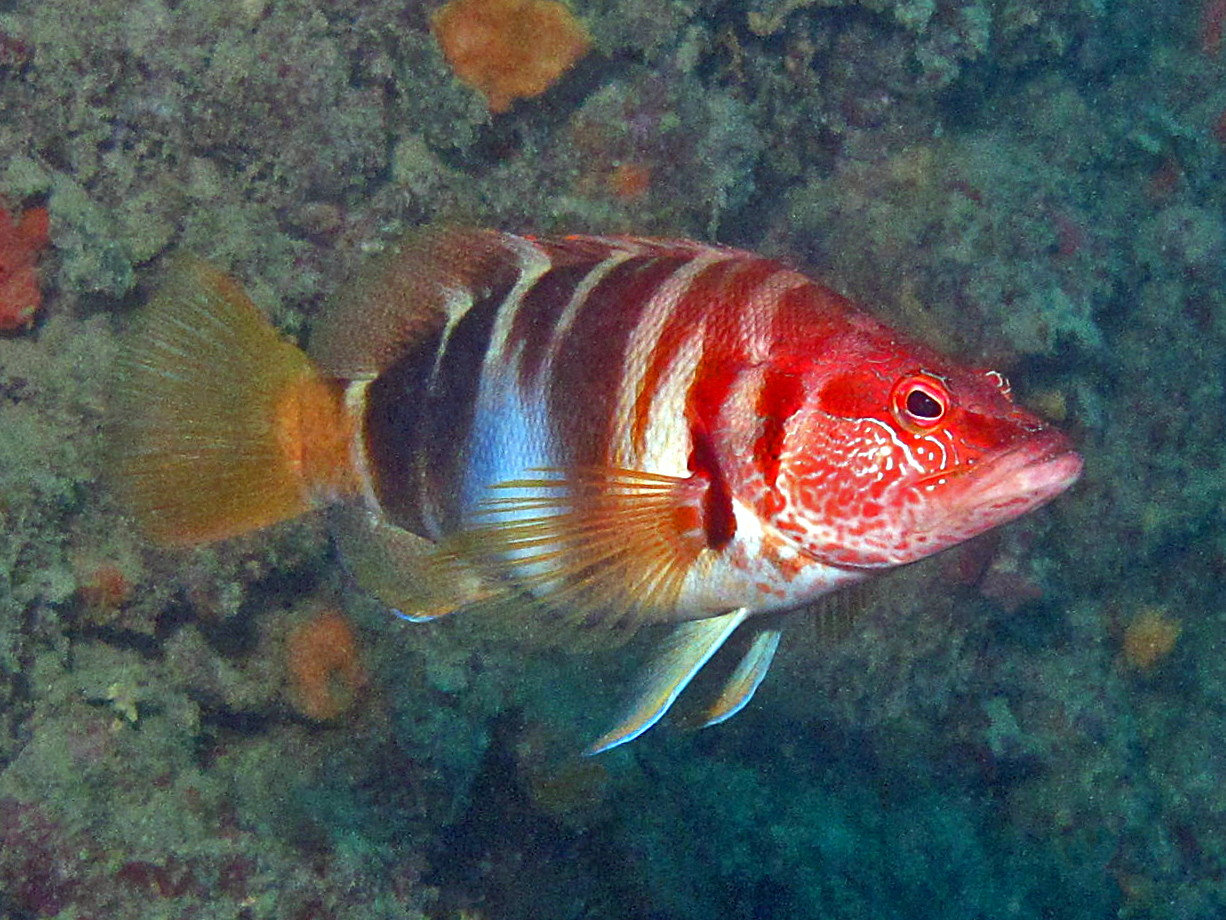
- Painted comber (Serranus scriba)

Conservation status
- Least Concern (IUCN 3.1)

Scientific classification
- Kingdom: Animalia
- Phylum: Chordata
- Class: Actinopterygii
- Division: Teleostei
- Order: Perciformes
- Family: Serranidae
- Genus: Serranus
- Species: S. scriba

Binomial name
- Serranus scriba (Linnaeus, 1758)

Synonyms
- Perca scriba Linnaeus, 1758; Paracentropristis scriba (Linnaeus, 1758); Perca marina Linnaeus, 1758; Holocentrus maroccanus Bloch & Schneider, 1801; Holocentrus argus Spinola, 1807; Serranus papilionaceus Valenciennes, 1832

= Painted comber =

Species of fish

The painted comber (Serranus scriba) is a species of marine ray-finned fish, a sea bass from the subfamily Serraninae, classified as part of the family Serranidae which includes the groupers and anthias. It is found in the eastern Atlantic Ocean, the Mediterranean Sea, and the Black Sea. Confusingly, a synonym of this species is Perca marina, but that name (as Sebastes marinus) has incorrectly been used for a separate species, the rose fish.

== Description ==
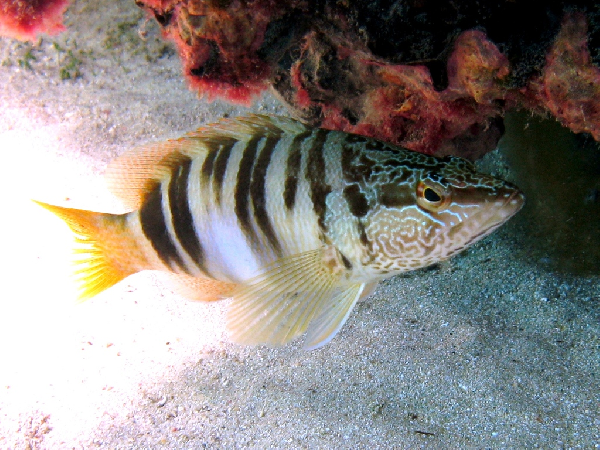
Painted comber in Koufonisi, Greece

The painted comber has a laterally compressed, elongate body with a pointed snout. The dorsal fin has 10 spines and 4–16 soft rays and the anal fin has 3 spines and 7–8 soft rays. The caudal fin is truncate. It has a very large mouth for its size, which has many sharp teeth, and is protractile. The overall colour may be grey, purplish or reddish with 5–7 dark brown bars on the flanks. The head is marked with many narrow, wavy blue lines and red blotches. The dorsal, anal and caudal fins are marked with red dots. There is a diffuse, purplish-blue blotch in the middle of the body. The pelvic and pectoral fins are normally uniform pale yellow. The maximum recorded fish measurement is 36 centimetres (14 in), although 25 centimetres (9.8 in) is more typical.

== Distribution ==
The painted comber is found in the eastern Atlantic Ocean where its core range extends from the Straits of Gibraltar to Senegal, including the Canary Islands but it occurs as far north as the Bay of Biscay. Its range extends into the Mediterranean and Black Seas. One of the most abundant places for Painted Comber is Marmaris.

== Habitat and biology ==
The painted comber occurs over rocky bottom and among beds of Posidonia at depths of 5 to 150 metres (16 to 492 ft). It normally spends the day sheltering in rocky caves and is normally either solitary or found in small groups. It emerges at dusk to hunt. It is a carnivorous species which is a territorial ambush hunter and has a diet made up of cephalopods, bivalves, crustaceans, fishes, and worms. It is often used to indicate sites occupied by octopuses as it waits at the entrance scavenging the octopus's discarded parts of shellfish. The spawning season runs from late spring to early summer with the eggs being laid under stones near the shore. It is a synchronous hermaphrodite, i.e. each individual has both male and female gonads and may be capable of self-fertilisation. They have a maximum life expectancy of 16 years.

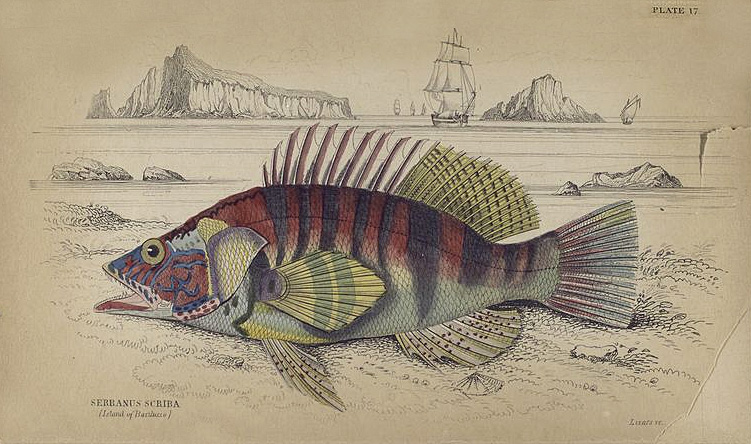
Drawing of a "Lettered Serramus" from The natural history of fishes of the perch family - The Naturalist's Library, 1835

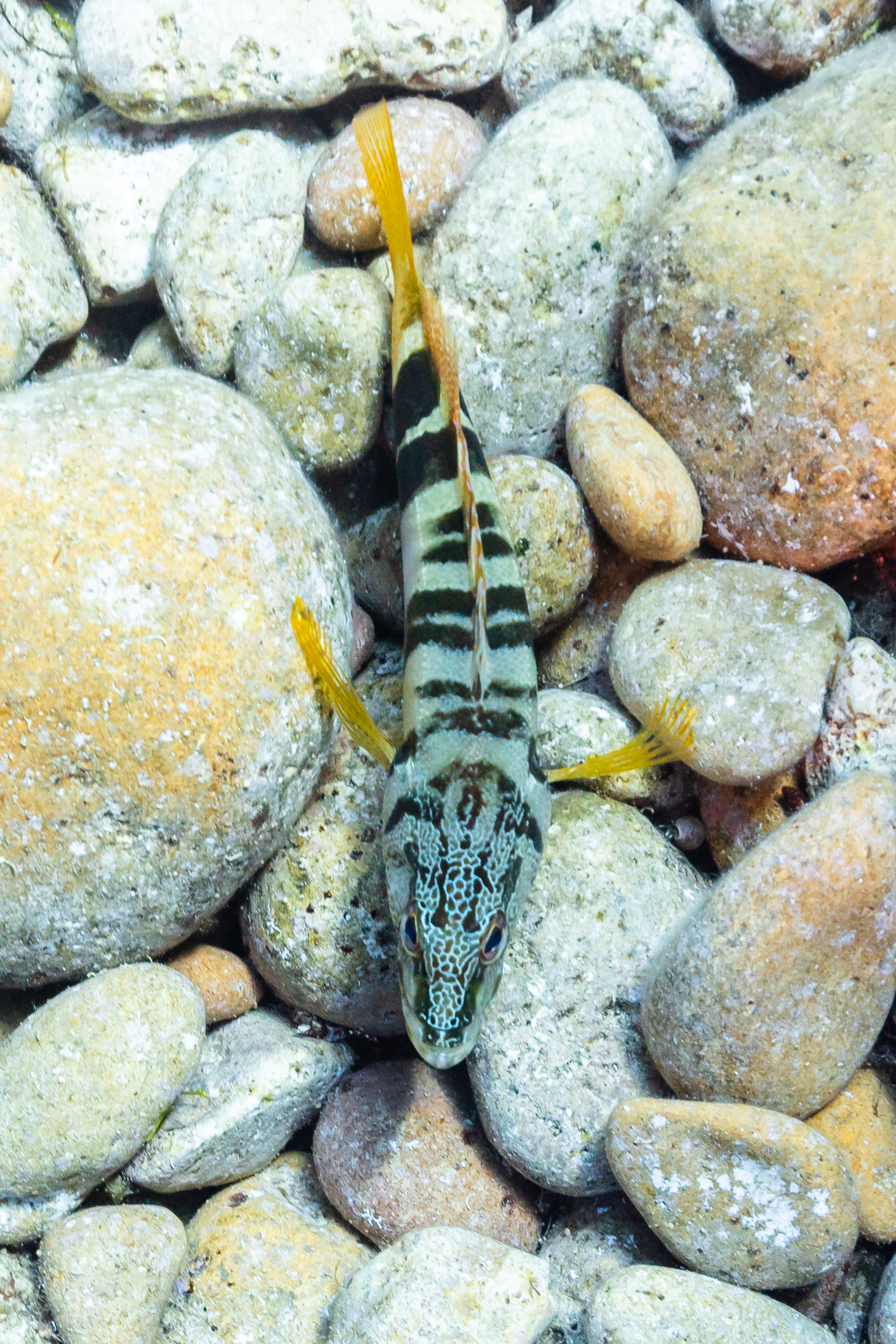
View from the top

== Parasites ==
The painted comber, like most fishes, is host to a variety of internal and external parasites and these include the copepods Lernanthropus scribae, Caligus scribae and Anchistrotos laqueus; an isopod Gnathia sp.; a monogenean Protolamellodiscus serranelli; and two species of digeneans Helicometra fasciata and Lecithochirium musculus.

== Taxonomy ==
The painted comber was first formally described by Linnaeus in the 10th Edition of his Systema Naturae published in 1758 as Perca scriba.

== Human use ==
The painted comber is landed by artisanal fisheries using hook and line and trawls. It is said to have palatable flesh and can be prepared using a variety of cooking methods.
