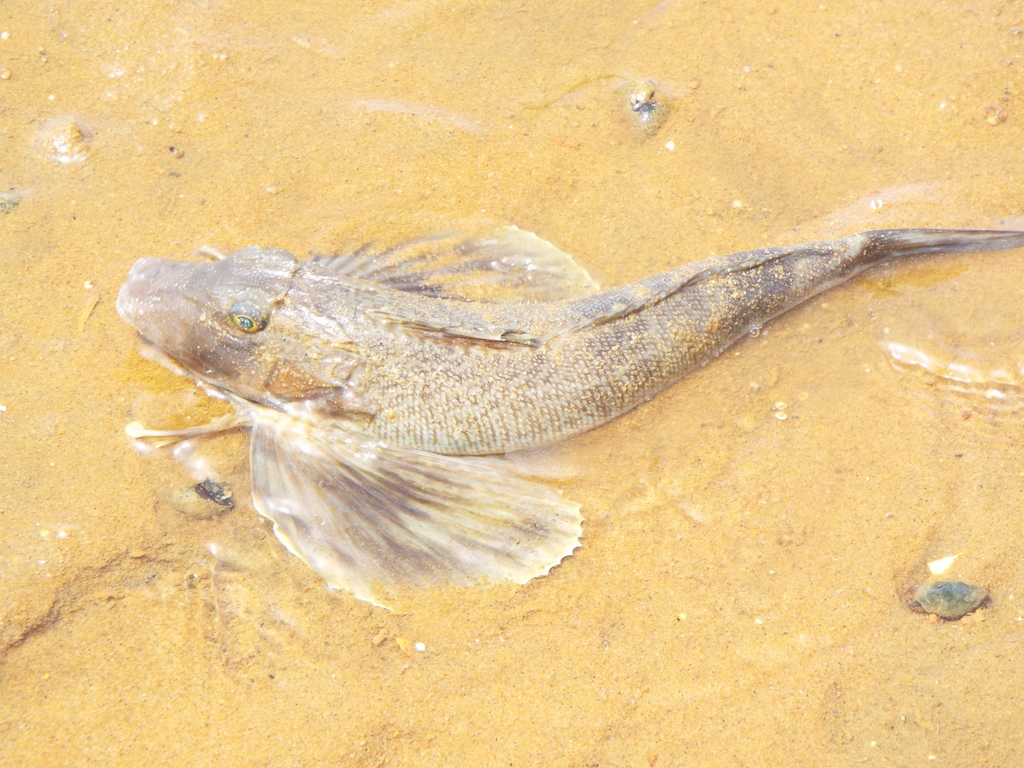

Conservation status
- Least Concern (IUCN 3.1)

Scientific classification
- Kingdom: Animalia
- Phylum: Chordata
- Class: Actinopterygii
- Division: Teleostei
- Order: Perciformes
- Family: Triglidae
- Genus: Prionotus
- Species: P. carolinus

Binomial name
- Prionotus carolinus (Linnaeus, 1771)

Synonyms
- Trigla carolina Linnaeus, 1771; Trigla palmipes Mitchill, 1815; Prionotus palmipes (Mitchill, 1815); Prionotus pileatus Storer, 1845; Prionotus affinis Hildebrand & Schroeder, 1928

= Prionotus carolinus =

Species of fish

Prionotus carolinus, the northern sea robin, is a species of marine ray-finned fish belonging to the family Triglidae, the sea robins. This fish is found in the western Atlantic Ocean.

== Taxonomy ==
Prionotus carolinus was first formally described in 1771 by the Swedish scientist Carl Linnaeus as Trigla carolina with the type locality give as "Carolina". The specific name refers to the type locality.

== Description ==
Prionotus carolinus can be identified by its broad spiny head, tapering body, blue eyes, and large, wing-like pectoral fins. The dorsal surface is reddish or grayish, the chin black, the belly pale and the fins reddish-brown with darker edges and paling to grayish-white at their bases. Three lower rays of the northern sea robin's pelvic fins are feelers used to "walk" along the bottom, so as to stir up bottom sediments to find food. Northern searobins grow to an average of 17 inches (43 cm) long.

== Distribution and habitat ==
Prionotus carolinus is found in shallow seas of the western Atlantic where its range extends from Nova Scotia along the Atlantic coast of the United States into the Gulf of Mexico as far as the upper Florida Keys. They are found in estuaries to the edge of the continental shelf. They prefer the sandy bottoms of the waterbed, where they feed by kicking up sediment to find food, using their "legs". The legs of Prionotus carolinus are particularly specialised for digging, alongside having sensory papillae to detect prey under the sand. These sensory papillae are only known to be present among searobins in this species and the closely related Prionotus scitulus, as evidenced by other species being less able to detect prey under sand.

== Diet ==
Prionotus carolinus feeds on a wide variety of invertebrates, including shrimp, crabs, amphipods, squid, bivalve mollusks, and segmented worms. It has also been known to bite readily on any bait, suggesting a fairly non-selective feeding habit.

== Uses ==
Prionotus carolinus are primarily fished for sport, as they put up a good fight when hooked. The spines make it difficult to clean them, but they have edible flesh that is comparable with kingcroaker or whiting and can be broiled and baked.

Other uses for the northern sea robin are processing into fish meal, pet food or fertiliser. They are also used for baiting lobster pots and handlines for catching flatfish. Their eggs have been used as a substitute for caviar.
