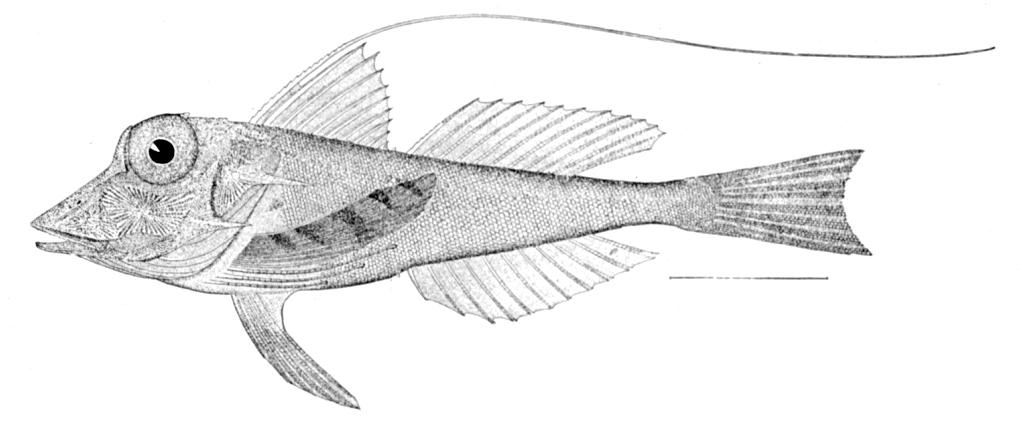

Conservation status
- Least Concern (IUCN 3.1)

Scientific classification
- Kingdom: Animalia
- Phylum: Chordata
- Class: Actinopterygii
- Order: Perciformes
- Family: Triglidae
- Genus: Bellator
- Species: B. egretta

Binomial name
- Bellator egretta (Goode & T. H. Bean, 1896)

Synonyms
- Prionotus egretta Goode & Bean, 1896

= Bellator egretta =

Species of fish

Bellator egretta, the streamer searobin, is a species of marine ray-finned fish belonging to the family Triglidae, the sea robins. This fish is found in the western Atlantic Ocean.

== Taxonomy ==
Bellator egretta was first formally described in 1896 as Prionotus egretta by the American ichthyologists George Brown Goode and Tarleton Hoffman Bean with the type locality given as off Barbados. The genus Bellator is one of 2 genera in the subfamily Prionotinae, one of 3 subfamilies in the family Triglidae, the sea robins and gurnards. The specific name egretta is the name of an avian genus, the egrets, and refers to the elongated ray in the dorsal fin of this species which resembles the long nuptial plumes of egrets.

== Description ==
Bellator egretta has a many spines on its head with short spiny plates on the front of the snout have blunt spines and no large spines anteriorly, It has a small mouth which does not extend to below the eye. There is a sharp spine in front of the eye and large tentacles above the rear of the eyes, The nostrils are surrounded by spines and there are large spines on preoperculum and operculum, The cleithral spine is short, not extending beyond the large spine on the upper operculum. The first dorsal fin has 11 spines, with the first spine being elongated in males, extending beyond the caudal fin, and the second dorsal fin has 11 or 12 soft rays. The anal fin also has 11 or 12 rays, typically 11. The pectoral fins are short, containing 12 fin rays joined by the fin membrane and these fins reach just beyond the origin of the anal fin. There are 3 enlarged rays below the fin which are free of the fin membrane, the uppermost of these is shorter than the main part of the fin. There are no scales on the breast, on the membrane above the spine on the operculum or on the nape breast without scales. The color is yellow-brown to orange brown in the upper body and head; the barred flanks are red above and yellow below. The first dorsal fin is dusky yellow, with a black spot between fourth and sixth spines, the soft dorsal fin has 6 oblique yellow lines; the upper half of the caudal fin is marked with yellow spots and its lower rays are red. The pectoral fin rays are reddish or yellowish and the upper 3 rays have alternating dark and light patches, these frequently form bars, the anal fin is red, occasionally with yellow bars. The maximum published total length of this fish is 20 cm (7.9 in).

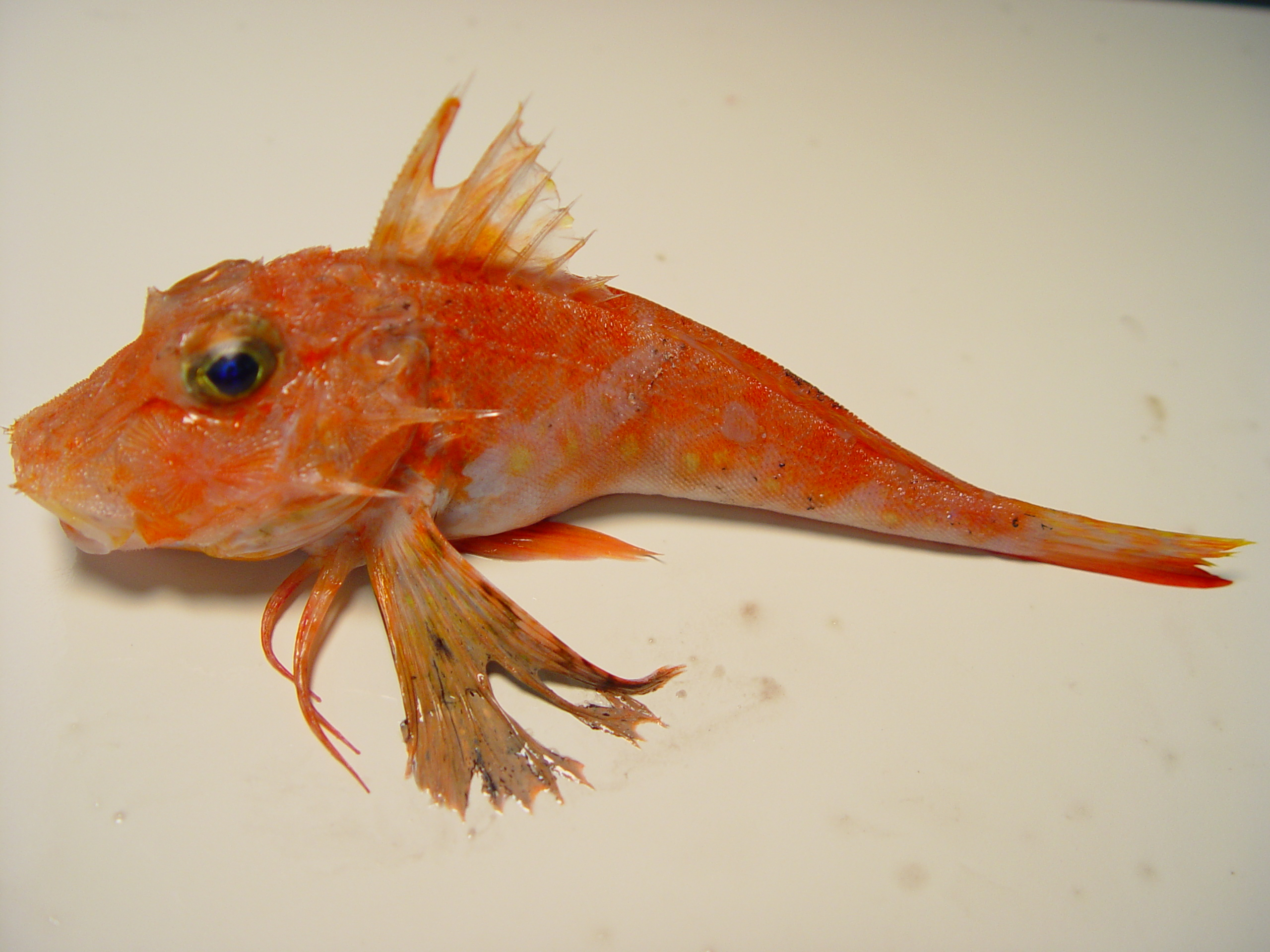

== Distribution and habitat ==
Bellator egretta is found in the Western Atlantic Ocean where it occurs from North Carolina south through the Gulf of Mexico and Caribbean Sea to northeastern Brazil. It is found in bays and estuaries over sand and mud substrates at depths between 40 and 232 m (131 and 761 ft), although it is typically found between 64 and 183 m (210 and 600 ft).

== Biology ==
Bellator egretta feeds on mobile benthic crustaceans such as shrimps and crabs and zooplankton, including the pelagic eggs and larvae of fishes.
