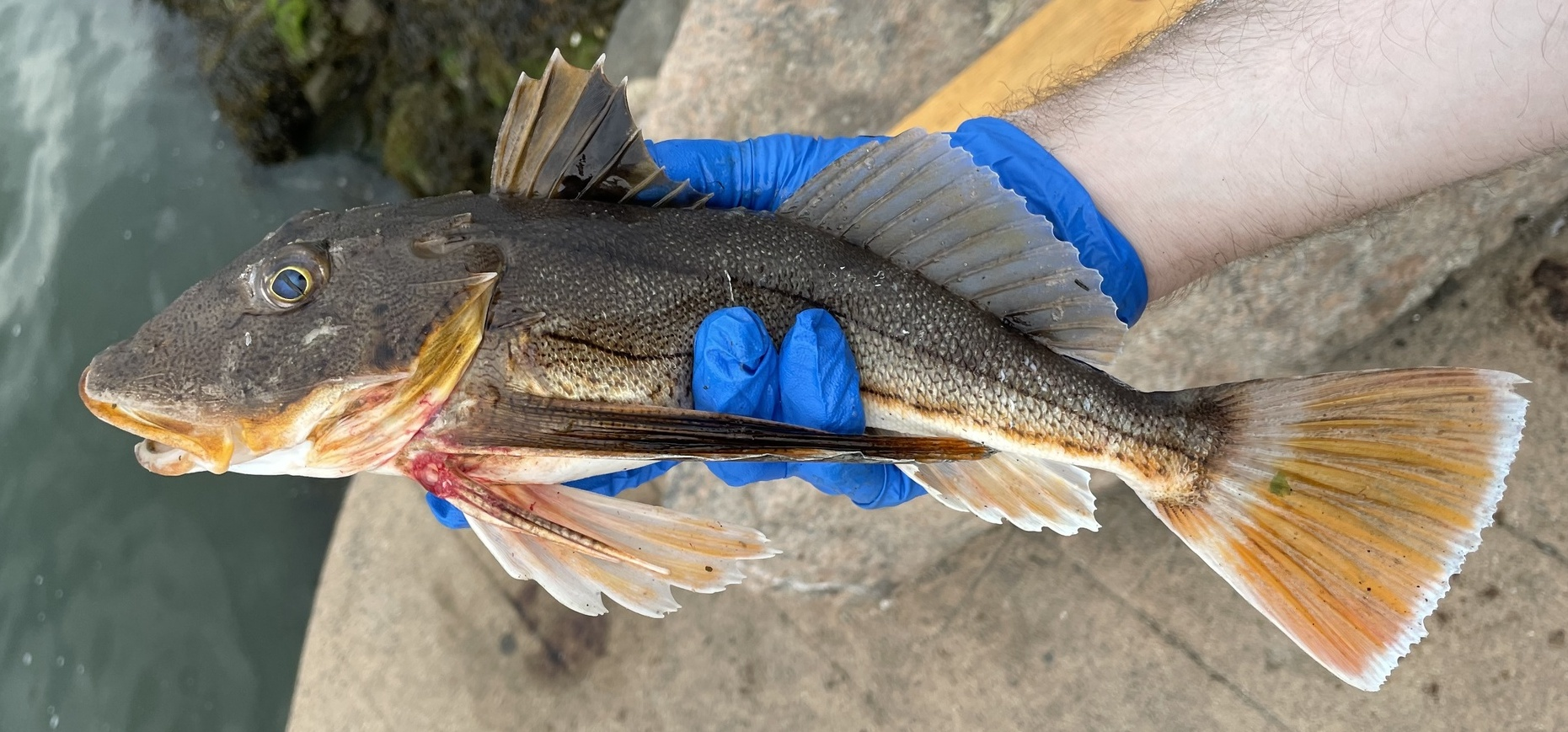
- In Connecticut, USA

Conservation status
- Least Concern (IUCN 3.1)

Scientific classification
- Kingdom: Animalia
- Phylum: Chordata
- Class: Actinopterygii
- Division: Teleostei
- Order: Perciformes
- Family: Triglidae
- Genus: Prionotus
- Species: P. evolans

Binomial name
- Prionotus evolans (Linnaeus, 1766)

Synonyms
- Trigla evolans Linnaeus, 1766; Trigla strigata Cuvier, 1829; Prionotus strigatus (Cuvier, 1829); Prionotus sarritor D.S. Jordan & C.H. Gilbert, 1883

= Prionotus evolans =

Species of fish

Prionotus evolans, the striped searobin, is a species of marine ray-finned fish belonging to the family Triglidae, the sea robins. This fish is found in the western Atlantic Ocean.

== Taxonomy ==
Prionotus evolans was first formally described in 1766 by the Swedish scientist Carl Linnaeus as Trigla evolans, with the type locality given as South Carolina and Jamaica. When Bernard Germain de Lacépède described the then monotypic genus Prionotus, its only species was Linnaeus's T. evolans, which he also designated as the type species of the genus. The specific name evolans means "flying away", an allusion to the long pectoral fins which resemble wings.

== Description ==
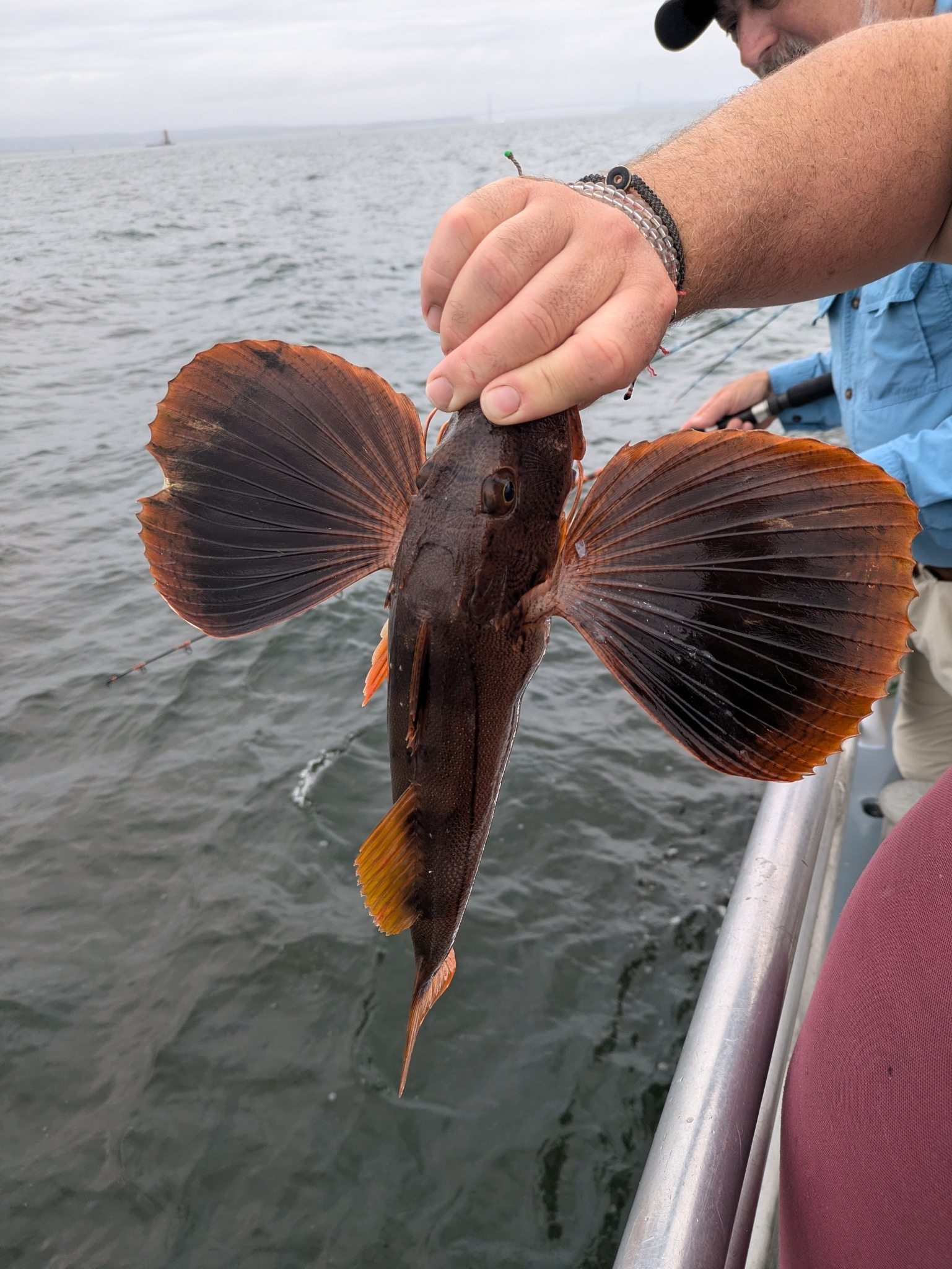
Spreading pectoral fins, New York.

The maximum published total length of the striped searobin is 45 cm (18 in), although 30 cm (12 in) is more typical, and the maximum published weight is 1.6 kg (3.5 lb). The overall color is reddish to olive brown with a thin dark stripe along the lateral line, another one runs parallel to that on the lower body. The whole of the pectoral fin is marked with closely-set, sinuous dark vertical lines with the inner part of the fin forming a dark patch. There is a dark blotch on the first dorsal fin between the fourth and fifth spines.

Prionotus evolans has a large and deep head, with no cirrhi at the nostrils or over the eyes; the nostrils also lack any spines near them. The mouth is large, extending as far as the anterior margin of the eye, and is slightly inferior with the lower jaw not protruding. The spine on the preoperculum does not extend beyond the operculum. There are two separate dorsal fins, the first has 10 spines and the second has 12 soft rays. The anal fin contains 10 soft rays. The pectoral fin has a rounded posterior margin and has 13-14 rays within its membrane, and the fin extends almost as far as the rear of the base of the anal fin. There are 3 enlarged rays at the bottom of fin which are free of the fin membrane. The body is covered in scales.

== Distribution and habitat ==
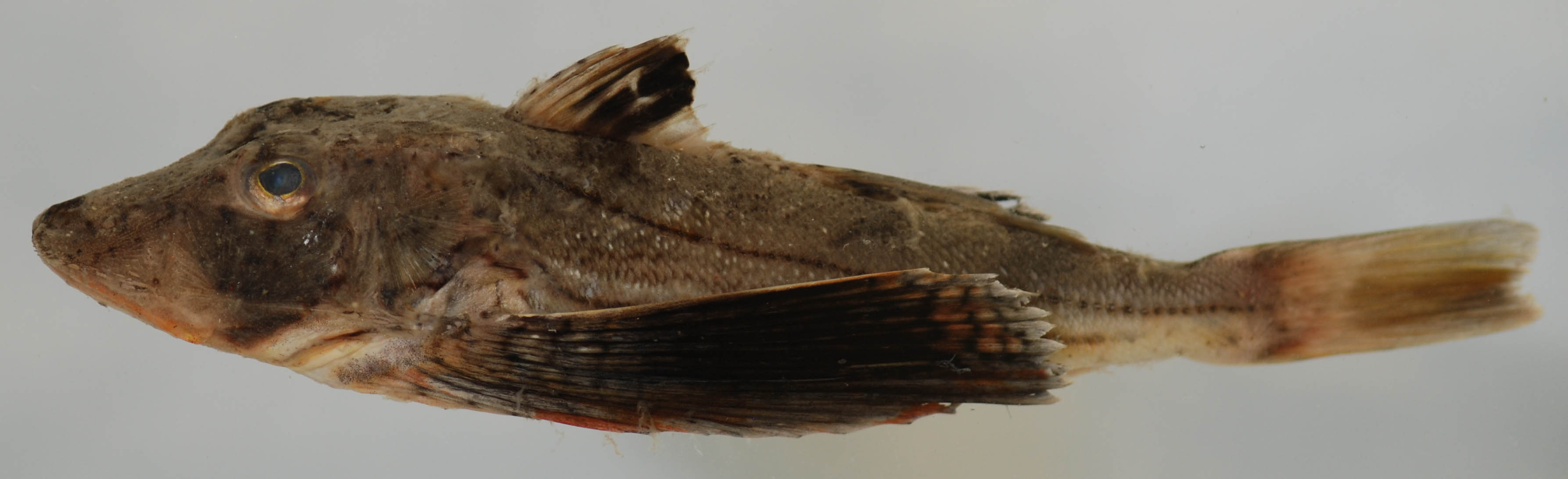
Smithsonian Environmental Research Center

Prionotus evolans is found in the Western Atlantic Ocean, from Nova Scotia in the north, southward along the Atlantic coast of the United States to southeastern Florida; it is also found around Bermuda. Striped searobins are rare north of Cape Cod, Massachusetts. It is found at depths between 9 and 180 m (30 and 591 ft), typically 20 to 70 m (66 to 230 ft), inhabiting sandy substrates from estuaries to offshore depths, infrequently being found associated with reefs.

== Biology ==
Prionotus evolans uses the free pectoral fin rays to manipulate objects and detect prey using chemoreception. The bony, square head of searobins can be used to excavate small prey items from the substrate. Their rather catholic diet includes crustaceans, cephalopods, gastropods, bivalves, amphipods, eggs, other fish and seaweed. Juveniles eat more copepods.

== Uses ==
The striped searobin has minor commercial uses and is a game fish. Reportedly it is good eating. It is also occasionally used as bait.
