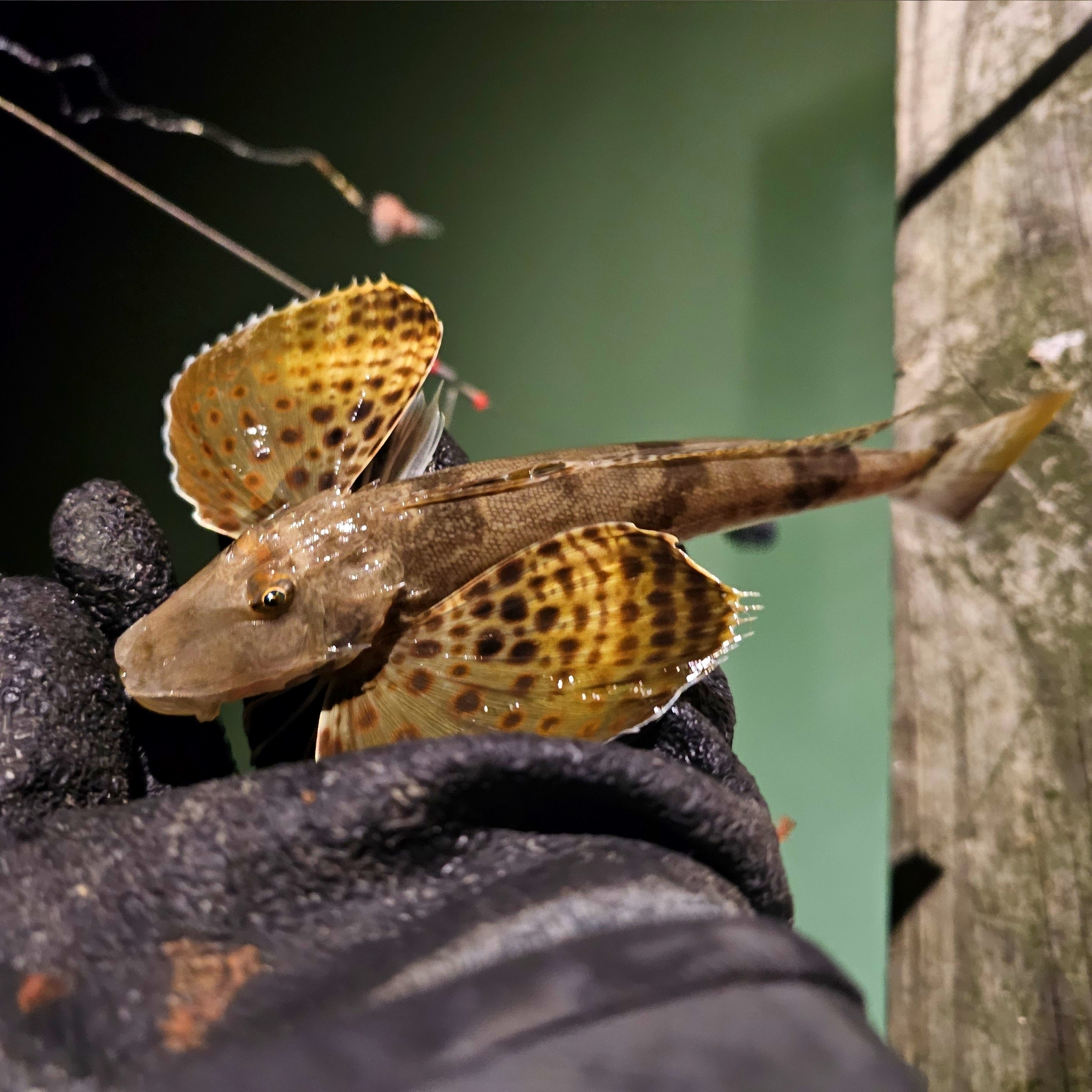
- Leopard searobin (P. scitulus)

Scientific classification
- Kingdom: Animalia
- Phylum: Chordata
- Class: Actinopterygii
- Order: Perciformes
- Family: Triglidae
- Subfamily: Prionotinae
- Genus: Prionotus; Lacépède, 1801

Type species
- Trigla evolans Linnaeus, 1766

Species
- See text

Synonyms
- List: Chriolax D.S. Jordan & Gilbert, 1879; Colotrigla Gill, 1905; Dinichthys Kaup, 1873; Exolissus D.S. Jordan, 1923; Fissala Gill, 1905; Gurnardus D.S. Jordan & Evermann, 1898; Marubecula Whitley, 1950; Merulinus D.S. Jordan & Evermann, 1898; Ornichthys Swainson, 1839; Triscurrichthys Whitley, 1931

= Prionotus =

Prionotus Temporal range: Middle Miocene to present

Genus of fishes

Prionotus is a genus of marine ray-finned fishes belonging to the family Triglidae, one of two genera belonging to the subfamily Prionotinae, the searobins. These fishes are found in the Western Atlantic Ocean and eastern Pacific Ocean, in the waters off the Americas.

== Taxonomy ==
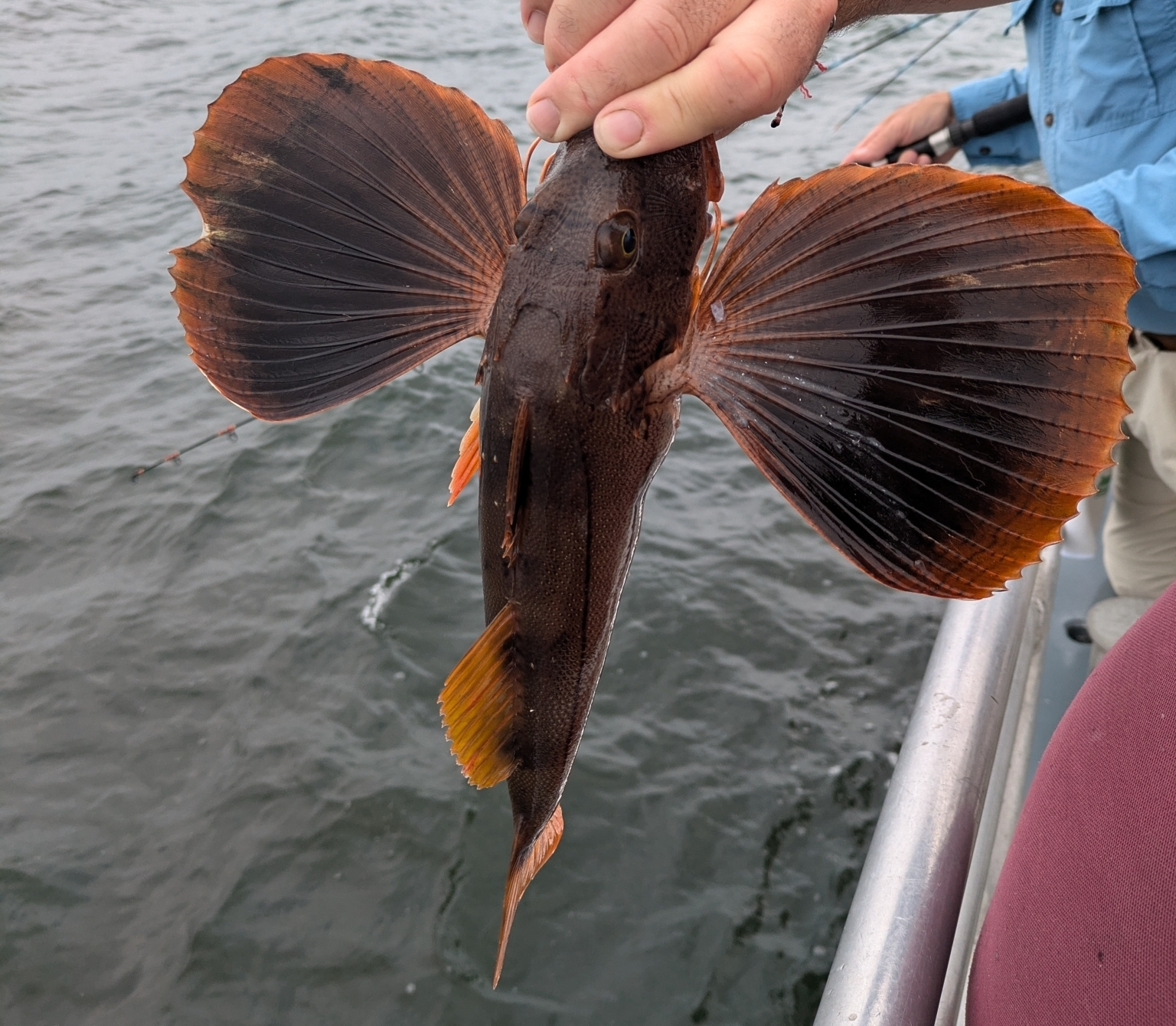
P. evolans, the type species

Prionotus was first described as a genus in 1801 by the French naturalist Bernard Germain de Lacépède, who described it as a monotypic genus with its type species being Trigla evolans, described by Linnaeus in 1766. The genus is one of 2 genera classified within the subfamily Prionotinae, the searobins, in the gurnard family Triglidae.

=== Etymology ===
The genus name is a compound of prion; "saw", and notus; "back", as Lacépède saw three free dorsal spines (not encased in the fin's membrane) when he was describing the type species P. evolans but these were probably the result of damage to the specimen.

== Evolution ==
The earliest known fossil remains of Prionotus are indeterminate remains from the Middle Miocene-aged Calvert Formation and the mid-late Miocene-aged St. Marys Formation of Maryland, US.

== Species ==
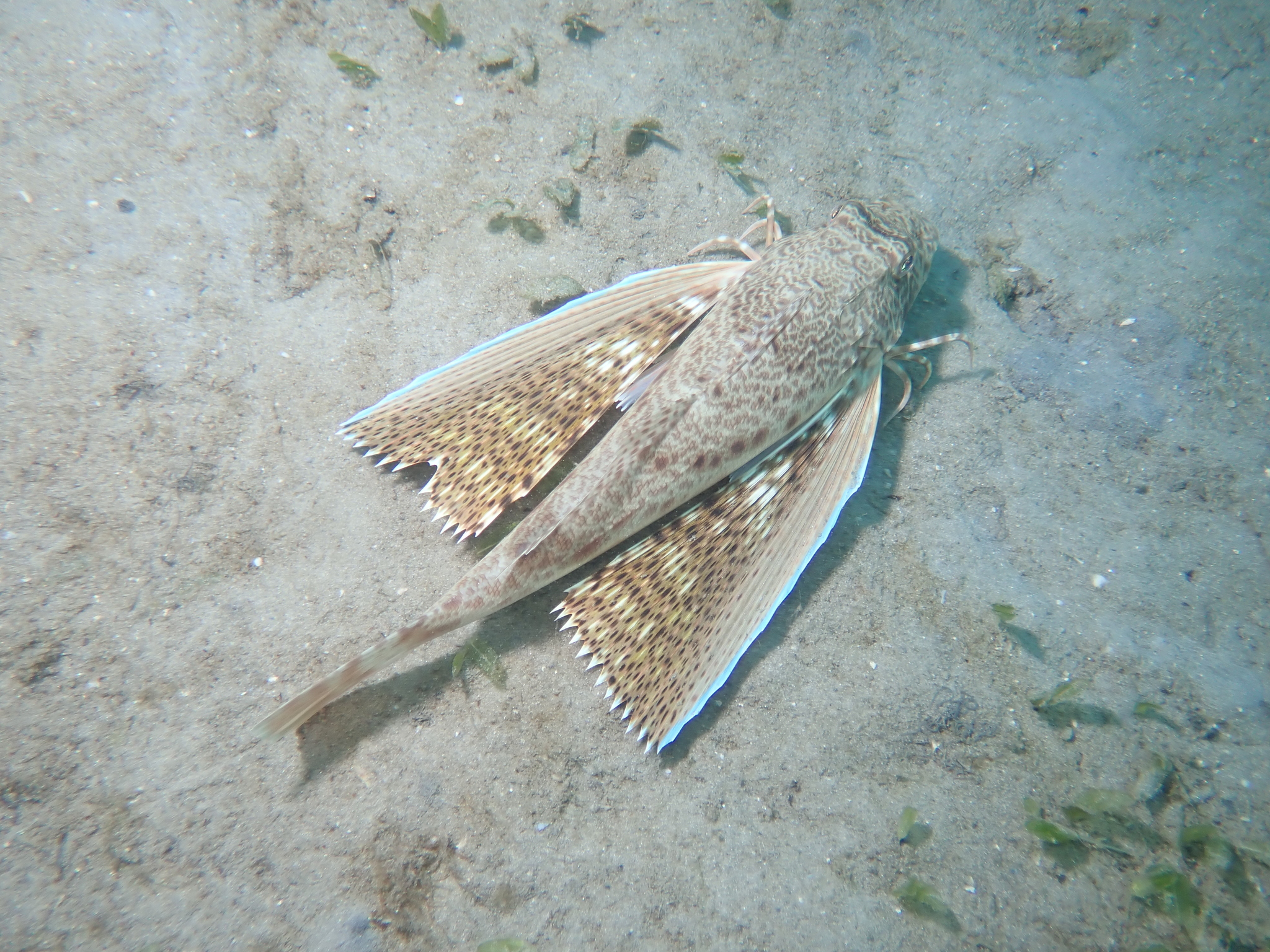
Bluewing searobin (P. punctatus)

There are currently 23 recognized species in this genus:

- Prionotus alatus Goode & T. H. Bean, 1883 (Spiny searobin)
- Prionotus albirostris D. S. Jordan & Bollman, 1890 (Whitesnout searobin)
- Prionotus beanii Goode, 1896 (Bean's searobin)
- Prionotus birostratus J. Richardson, 1844 (Two-beaked searobin)
- Prionotus carolinus (Linnaeus, 1771) (Northern searobin)
- Prionotus evolans (Linnaeus, 1766) (Striped searobin)
- Prionotus horrens J. Richardson, 1844 (Bristly searobin)
- Prionotus longispinosus Teague, 1951 (Bigeye searobin)
- Prionotus martis Ginsburg, 1950 (Gulf of Mexico barred searobin)
- Prionotus miles Jenyns, 1840 (Galápagos gurnard)
- Prionotus murielae Mowbray, 1928
- Prionotus nudigula Ginsburg, 1950 (Red searobin)
- Prionotus ophryas D. S. Jordan & Swain, 1885 (Bandtail searobin)
- Prionotus paralatus Ginsburg, 1950 (Mexican searobin)
- Prionotus pictus Victor, 2025 (Painted searobin)
- Prionotus punctatus (Bloch, 1793) (Bluewing searobin)
- Prionotus roseus D. S. Jordan & Evermann, 1887 (Bluespotted searobin)
- Prionotus rubio D. S. Jordan, 1886 (Blackwing searobin)
- Prionotus ruscarius Gilbert & Starks, 1904 (Common searobin)
- Prionotus scitulus D. S. Jordan & Gilbert, 1882 (Leopard searobin)
- Prionotus stearnsi D. S. Jordan & Swain, 1885 (Shortwing searobin)
- Prionotus stephanophrys Lockington, 1881 (Lumptail searobin)
- Prionotus teaguei Briggs, 1956 (Long-ray searobin)
- Prionotus tribulus G. Cuvier, 1829 (Bighead searobin)

P. murielae is based on a single holotype and in 2020 it was proposed that this was a juvenile of P. ophyras, and this taxon is treated as a junior synonym of P. ophryas.

== Characteristics ==
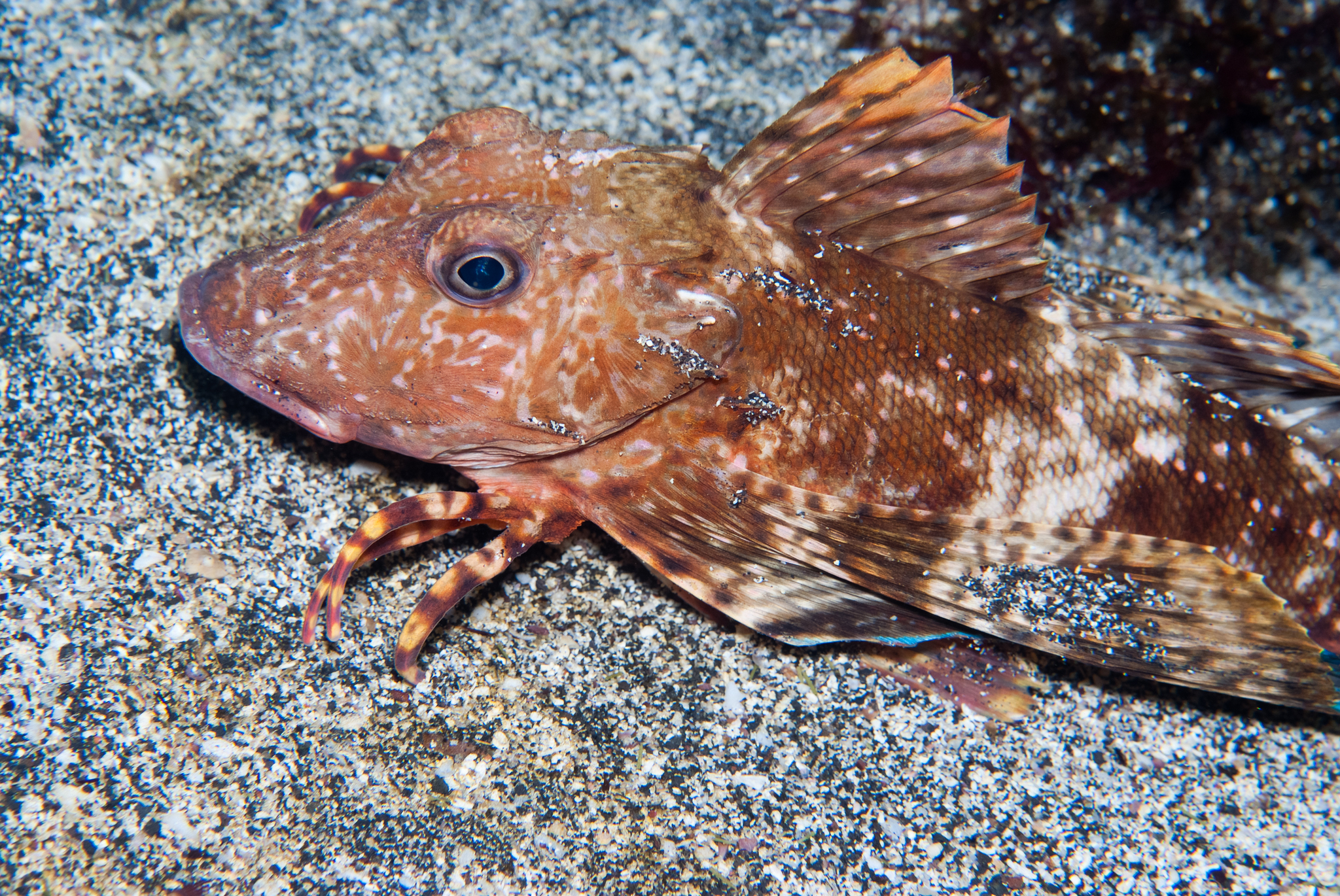
Gurnard from the Galápagos; either P. miles or the newly recognized P. pictus

Prionotus searobins have a large, nearly square and bony head which bears a number of spines and ridges with a wide interorbital space. The mouth is either terminal or slightly inferior with "simple" teeth on the jaws and on the roof of the mouth. There are 2 separate dorsal fins; the first usually possessing 10, sometimes 9 or 11, spines, although the very short rear spines are very difficult to discern. The second dorsal fin has 11 to 13 soft rays. The long pectoral fins extend beyond the middle of the base of the anal fin and contains 13-14 rays within its membrane, and 2-3 enlarged rays at the bottom of the fin that are free, not encased in the membrane. Most of the body is covered in rough scales including the upper rear flap of the operculum over the spine with scales and the nape. The largest species is the common sea robin (P. ruscarius) of the Eastern Pacific Ocean, which has a maximum published total length of 30.5 cm (12.0 in), while the smallest is P. murielae with a maximum published total length of 6 cm (2.4 in).

== Distribution and habitat ==
Prionotus sea robins are found in the tropical and temperate waters of the Eastern Pacific Ocean and Western Pacific Ocean off both North and South America. These benthic fishes occur in inshore waters such as bays and estuaries. Fossils of Prionotus have been found in England and along the Atlantic Coast of the United States from Florida to New Jersey.

== Biology ==
Prionotus are able to create "grunting" vocalisations by vibrating the swim bladder using certain muscles; due to resonance within the swim bladder, this sound resembles the croaking of a frog and is likely the origin of the alternative common name of "gurnard", derived from a French word meaning, "to grunt". These fishes are less active in the daylight hours and are mostly nocturnal, using their enlarged separate pectoral fin rays to "walk" along the substrate and detect prey buried in the sand or mud. These rays can manipulate objects and detect prey using chemoreception. The bony, square head can be used to excavate small prey items from the substrate and their rather catholic diet includes crustaceans such as amphipods, cephalopods, gastropods, bivalves, eggs, other fish, and seaweed, with the juveniles eating more copepods. Their sharp spines seem to deter most predators but they are preyed on by some sharks.

During mating season they are known to make a staccato call, different from their typical grunts. They spawn between late spring and early fall, with activity peaking in July and August. They are batch spawners; the females have a few ripe eggs at a time and these are fertilized externally. The pelagic eggs are yellow, and have a diameter of less than 1 millimeter. They take around 60 hours to hatch and there is no parental care. The hatchling larvae are between 2 and 3 mm (0.079 and 0.118 in) in length. The walking rays develop when the larvae reach a length of 150 mm (5.9 in) and they attain sexual maturity around 2 or 3 years old, and may live for up to 11 years, though they usually they only live around 8 years.

== See also ==
- List of prehistoric bony fish
- Sea robin
