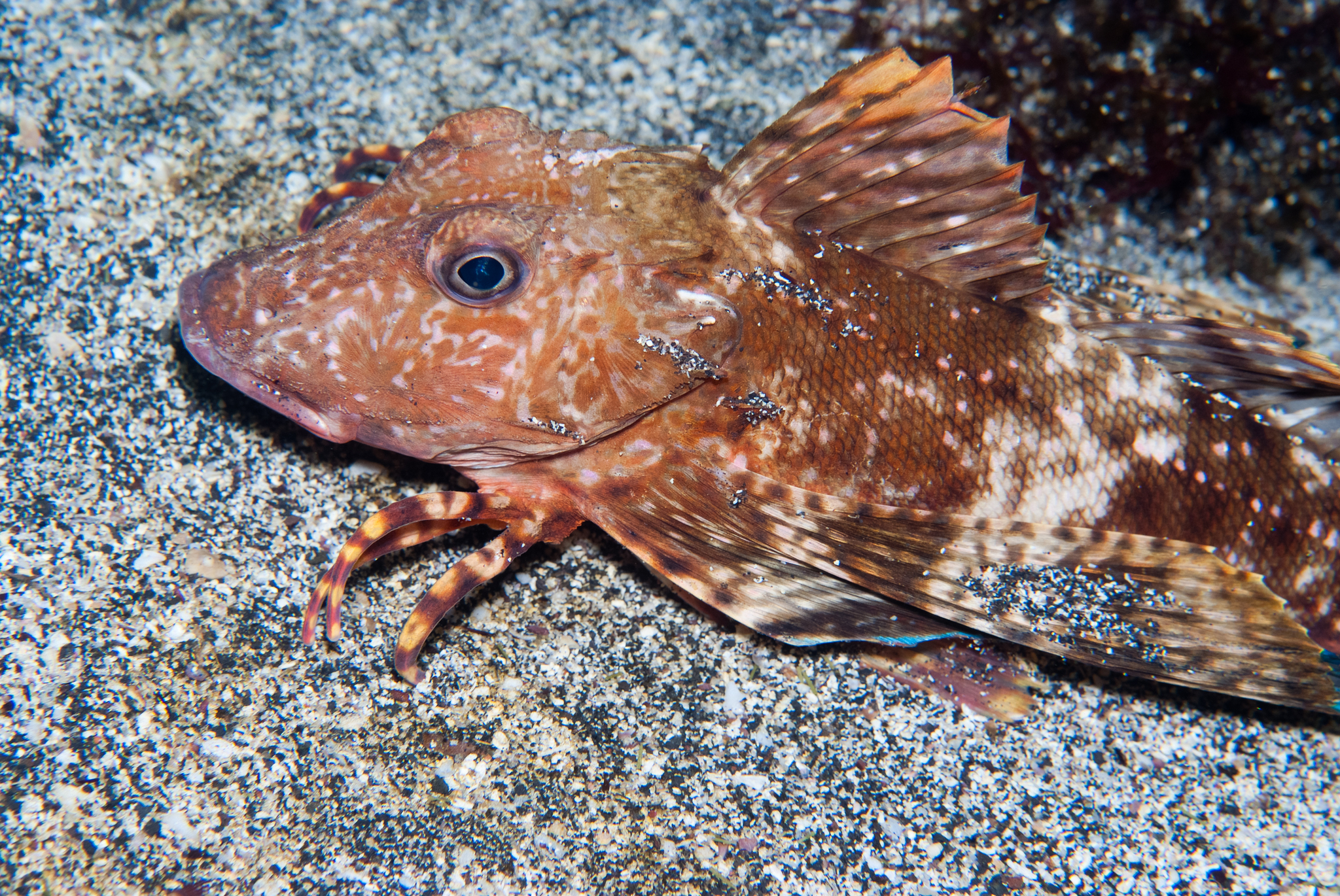

Conservation status
- Least Concern (IUCN 3.1)

Scientific classification
- Kingdom: Animalia
- Phylum: Chordata
- Class: Actinopterygii
- Order: Perciformes
- Family: Triglidae
- Genus: Prionotus
- Species: P. miles

Binomial name
- Prionotus miles Jenyns, 1840

= Prionotus miles =

Species of fish

Prionotus miles, the Galapagos sea robin, is a species of marine ray-finned fish belonging to the family Triglidae, the sea robins. This fish is found in the Galapagos Islands.

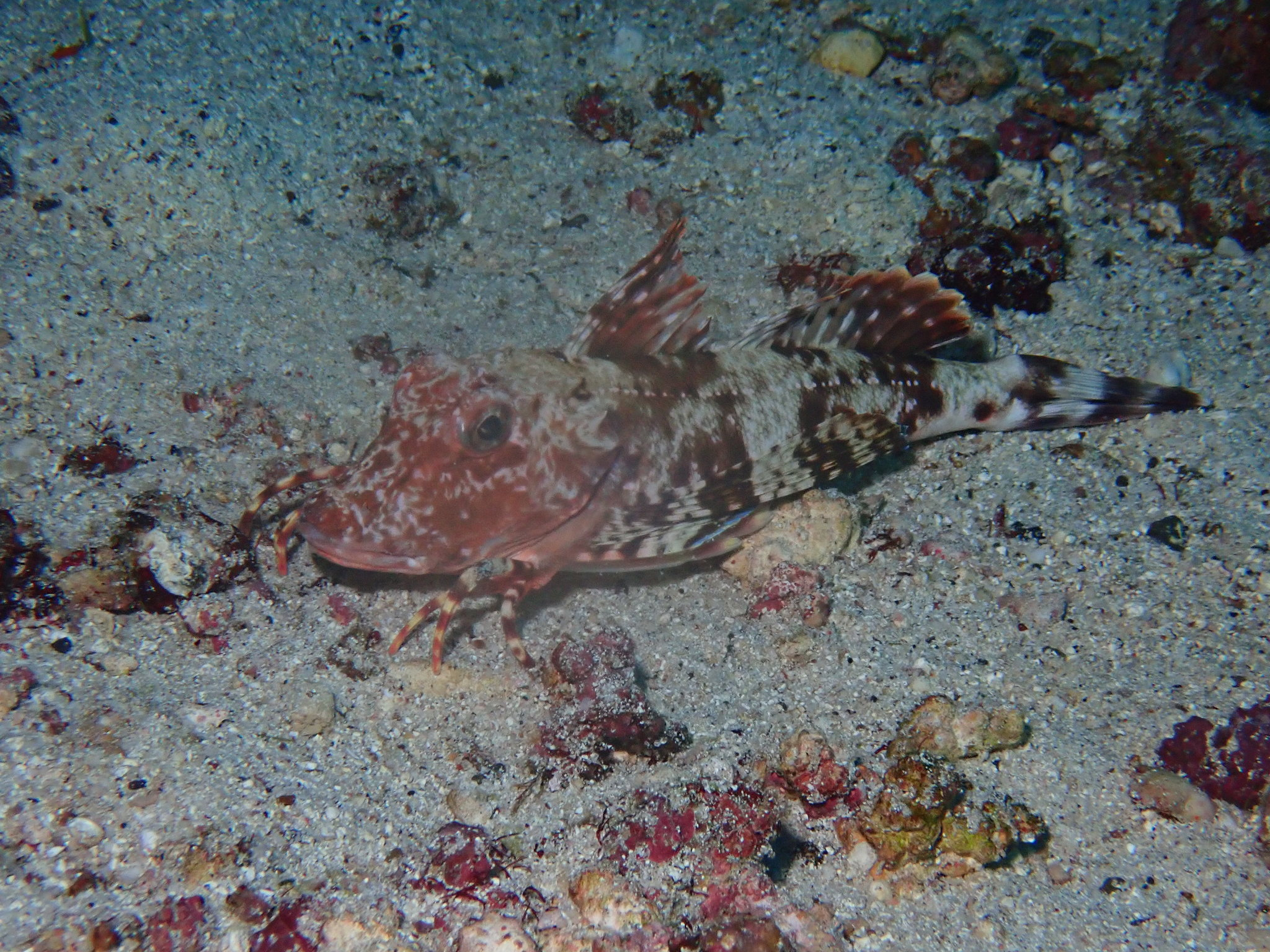
In the Galapagos Islands
