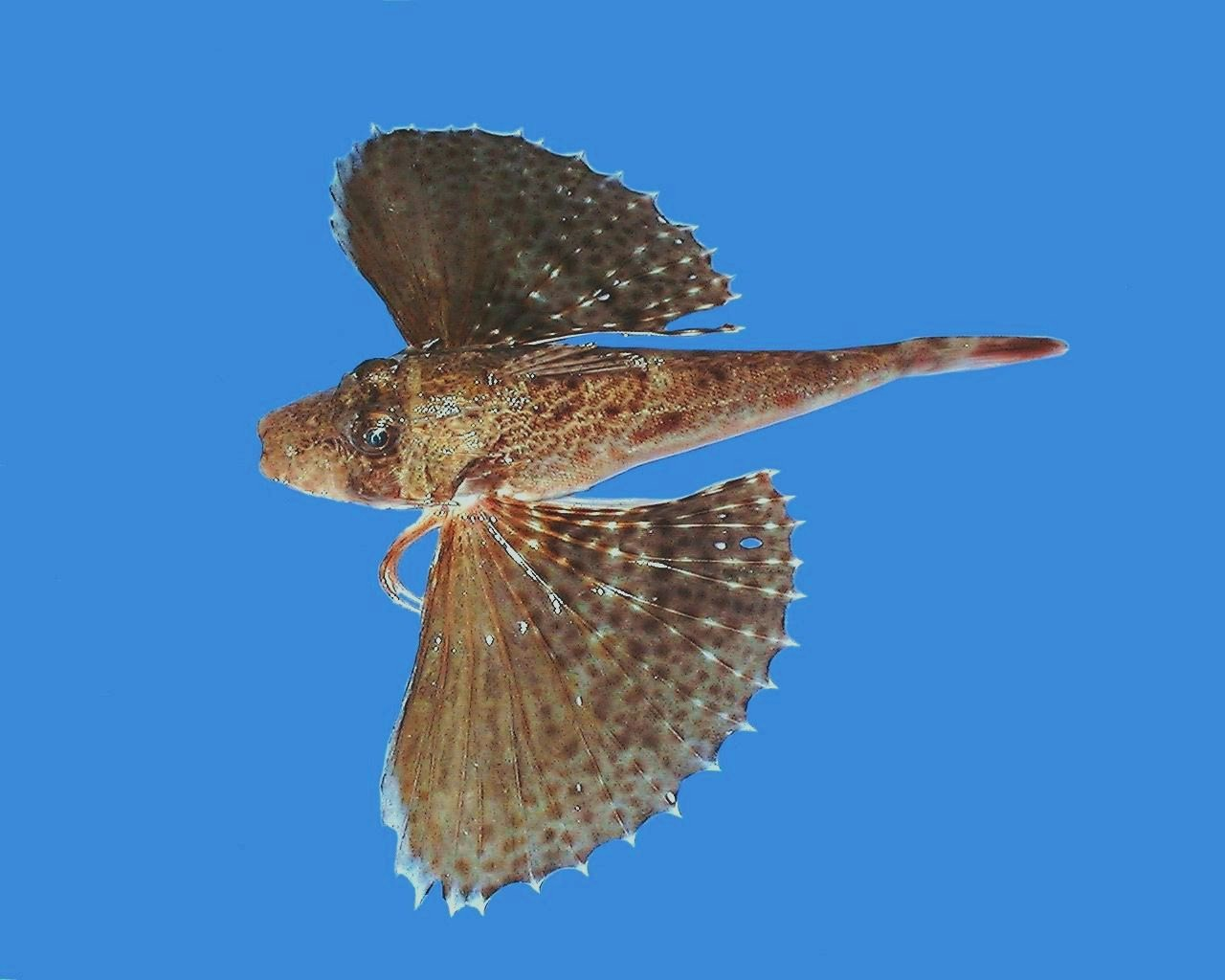
- NOAA's Fisheries Collection; Collection of Brandi Noble

Conservation status
- Least Concern (IUCN 3.1)

Scientific classification
- Kingdom: Animalia
- Phylum: Chordata
- Class: Actinopterygii
- Order: Perciformes
- Family: Triglidae
- Genus: Prionotus
- Species: P. rubio

Binomial name
- Prionotus rubio D. S. Jordan, 1886

= Prionotus rubio =

Species of fish

Prionotus rubio, the blackwing sea robin, is a species of marine ray-finned fish belonging to the family Triglidae, the sea robins.

== Range and distribution ==
Prionotus rubio is endemic to the Western Atlantic Ocean, widely distributed inshore throughout the greater Caribbean. Its range follows the Western Atlantic coastline from North Carolina all the way south through Cuba to the Yucatán Peninsula, while its highest population density is concentrated within the Gulf of Mexico.

== Biology ==
Characteristic of most members of Triglidae, much of P. rubio's body length consists of a hard, bony head. It also possesses broad pectoral fins with the first three rays of each modified into leg-like 'walking rays'. These appendages provide refined benthic locomotion and are capable of detecting chemical traces of prey, and are used to probe soft substrates in search of epibenthic invertebrates It can be distinguished from other sympatric triglids throughout much of its native range by the distinct blue margin on the lower edge of its pectoral fins.

Prionotus rubio is a generalist demersal predator, with a diverse diet consisting of small, benthic invertebrates (primarily arthropods and mollusks), as well as occasional small teleost prey. Gut content analysis revealed it to have a particular preference for crustaceans, with brown shrimp (Farfantepenaeus aztecus), swimming crabs (Portunus spinicarpus), and rock shrimp (Sicyonia dorsalis) composing the largest portion of prey taken. This study also revealed P. rubio to have a similar seasonal migration pattern to other Western Atlantic Prionotus spp., although notably these dietary habits do not significantly vary with seasonality and subsequent migration. Epibenthic crustaceans favored by P. rubio–such as penaeids, portunids, and Sicyonia spp.–are consistently abundant across the entire Western Atlantic shelf, which constitutes the entirety of their migrational range.

== Migration ==
Inshore Western Atlantic Prionotus spp. such as P. rubio are recorded inshore during spring months and offshore in early winter, with negligible movement North or South.

During springtime, when warmer temperatures and extended photoperiods increase productivity and prey availability in shallow waters, Prionotus migrate inshore to coastal or estuarine habitats to feed. As temperatures continue to climb during summer, populations of Prionotus move onto the inner continental shelf where spawning is initiated. Hatching and settlement of larval Prionotus occur across the inner continental shelf from July through October, with their densities peaking during September. Once the reproductive period ends, populations of Prionotus shift offshore to the outer Western Atlantic continental shelf as water temperatures decline. Older, larger juveniles spawned on the inner coastal shelf follow this pattern even within the same year as they are hatched, being observed further offshore than their younger, smaller counterparts.

== Relationship to humans ==
No dedicated fishery exists for P. rubio, so the species is often regarded as bycatch by shrimp trawlers and other commercial fishing vessels and subsequently discarded.
