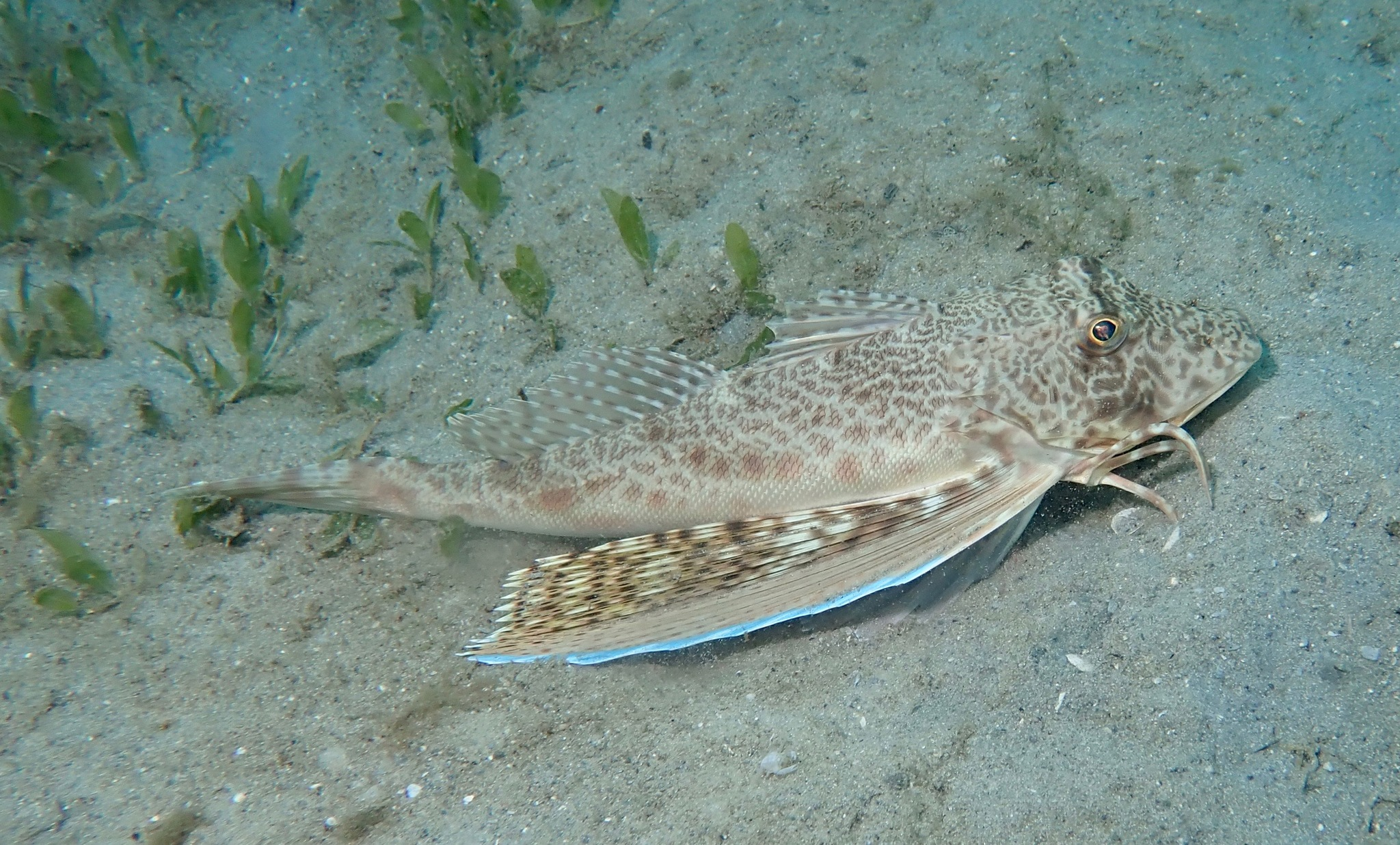

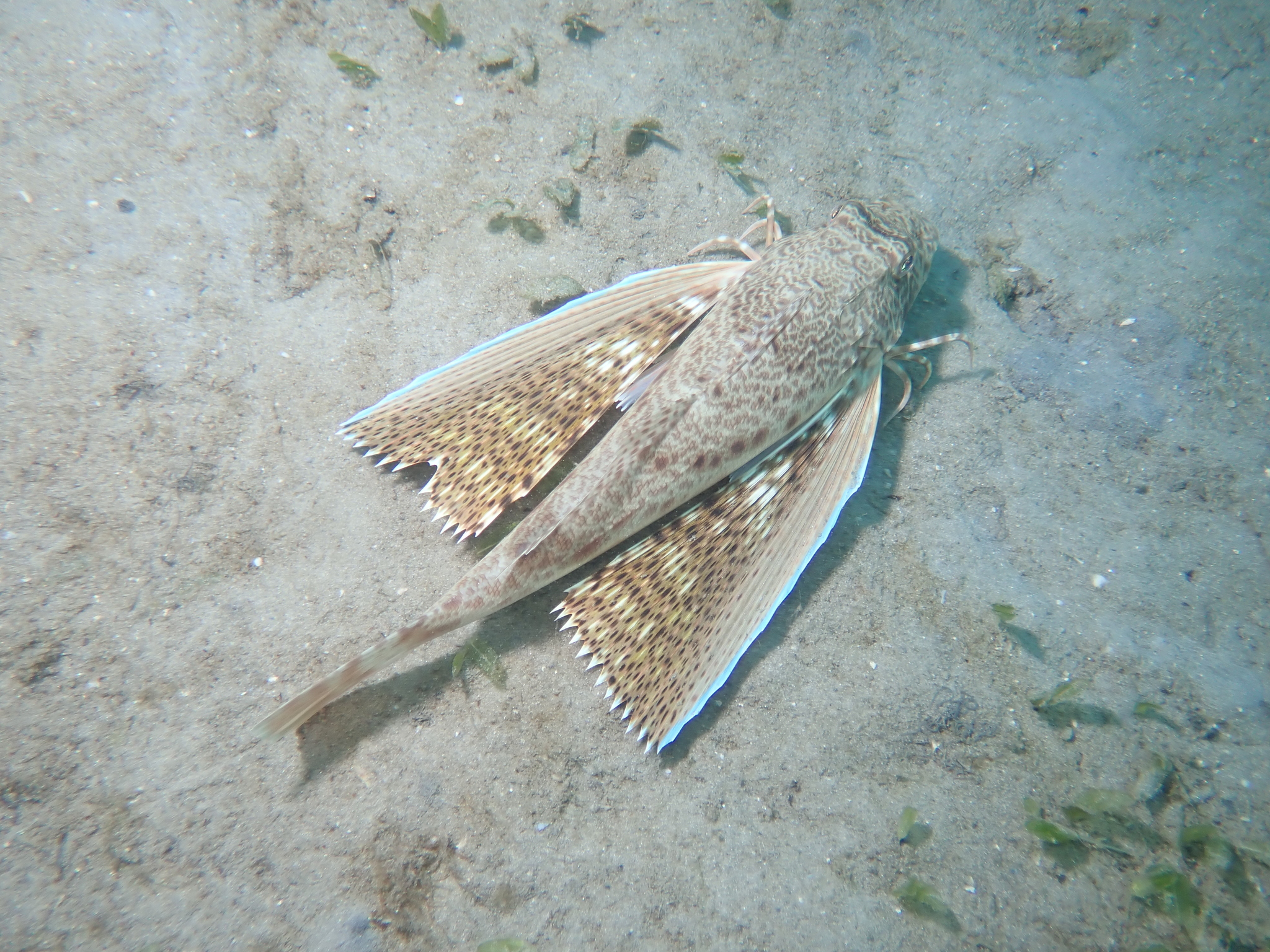
- Side and dorsal view, in Florida

Conservation status
- Least Concern (IUCN 3.1)

Scientific classification
- Kingdom: Animalia
- Phylum: Chordata
- Class: Actinopterygii
- Order: Perciformes
- Family: Triglidae
- Genus: Prionotus
- Species: P. punctatus

Binomial name
- Prionotus punctatus (Bloch, 1793)

= Prionotus punctatus =

Species of fish

Prionotus punctatus, the bluewing sea robin, is a species of marine ray-finned fish belonging to the family Triglidae, the sea robins. This fish is found in the western Atlantic Ocean.
