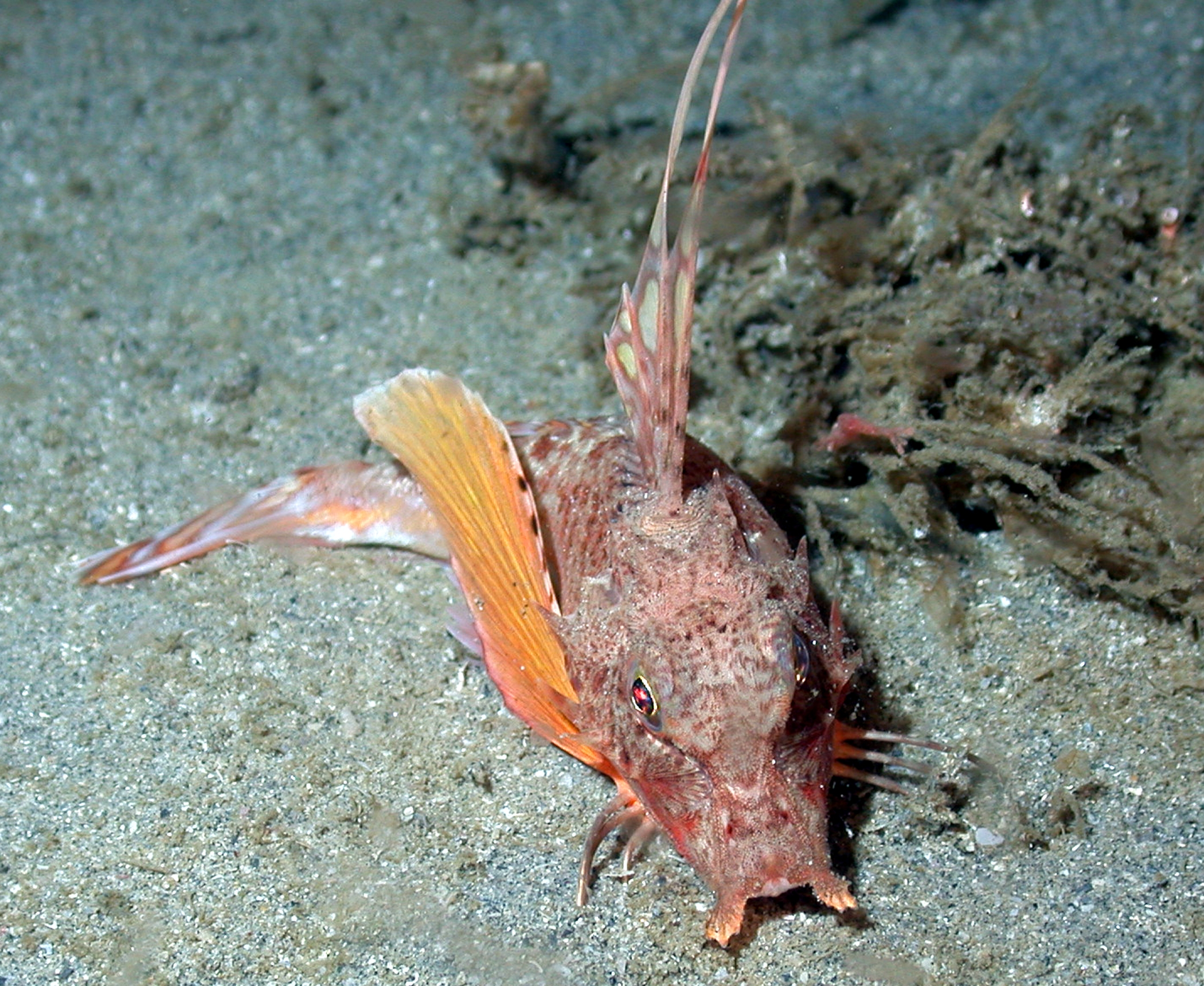

Conservation status
- Least Concern (IUCN 3.1)

Scientific classification
- Kingdom: Animalia
- Phylum: Chordata
- Class: Actinopterygii
- Order: Perciformes
- Family: Triglidae
- Genus: Bellator
- Species: B. militaris

Binomial name
- Bellator militaris (Goode & T. H. Bean, 1896)

Synonyms
- Prionotus militaris Goode & Bean, 1896

= Bellator militaris =

Species of fish

Bellator militaris, the horned sea robin, is a species of marine ray-finned fish belonging to the family Triglidae, the sea robins. This fish is found in the western Atlantic Ocean.

== Taxonomy ==
Bellator militaris was first formally described in 1896 as Prionotus militaris by the American ichthyologists George Brown Goode and Tarleton Hoffman Bean with the type locality given as off Cape Catoche in Yucatán, Mexico. When David Starr Jordan and Barton Warren Evermann described the genus Bellator it was monotypic and P. militaris was its only species, although Jordan and Evermann also designated it as the type species This genus is one of 2 genera in the subfamily Prionotinae, one of 3 subfamilies in the family Triglidae, the sea robins and gurnards. The specific name militaris means "like a soldier", and is thought to be a reference to the elongate first two spines in the dorsal fin.

== Description ==
Bellator militaris has slender, spines at the front of the snout and these extend past the tip snout like horns. It has a small mouth which does not extend to below the eye. The largest spine is on the preoperculum with a smaller on at the base of the preoperculum. There is a large spine to the rear of the operculum and extends beyond the largest opercular spine. The first dorsal fin has 11 spines, the first 2 spines extending to or beyond the tip of the caudal fin in males, while the second dorsal fin has 11 soft rays. The anal fin typically has 11 soft rays but sometimes has 12. The pectoral fins are short, containing 12 fin rays joined by the fin membrane and these fins reach just beyond the origin of the anal fin. There are 3 enlarged rays below the fin which are free of the fin membrane, the uppermost of these is shorter than the main part of the fin. There are no scales on the breast, on the membrane above the spine on the operculum or on the nape breast without scales. The color of the upper third of the head and body is rosy red. There are 2 or 3 thin yellow longitudinal stripes extending to the base of the caudal fin. The first dorsal fin is red marked with yellow spots and a small black spot between outer edges of fourth and fifth spines. The soft dorsal fin has 3 yellow stripes and normally has a dark spot at the base of rearmost ray. The upper pectoral rays are clearly barred black and white while the lowest ray is blackish and the fin between these is pink. The caudal fin has 5 yellow stripes on its upper part with the lower part being red. The maximum published total length of this species is 16 cm (6.3 in).

== Distribution and habitat ==
Bellator militaris is found in the western Atlantic where it ranges from North Carolina south along the Atlantic coast of the United States, it occurs throughout the Gulf of Mexico but it is absent from northwestern Cuba. In the Caribbean it has been recorded from Puerto Rico to Saba, and along the coasts of Central and South America south from Mexico to Archipelago of San Bernardo in Colombia. It has also been recorded from the northern coast of South America off Suriname to French Guiana. The horned sea robin is found in bays and estuaries to the middle of the continental shelf, occurring on bottoms consisting sand and mud a depths between 20 and 216 m (66 and 709 ft), normally between 20 and 73 m (66 and 240 ft).

== Biology ==
Bellator militaris feeds on mobile benthic crustaceans such as shrimps and crabs and zooplankton, including the pelagic eggs and larvae of fishes.
