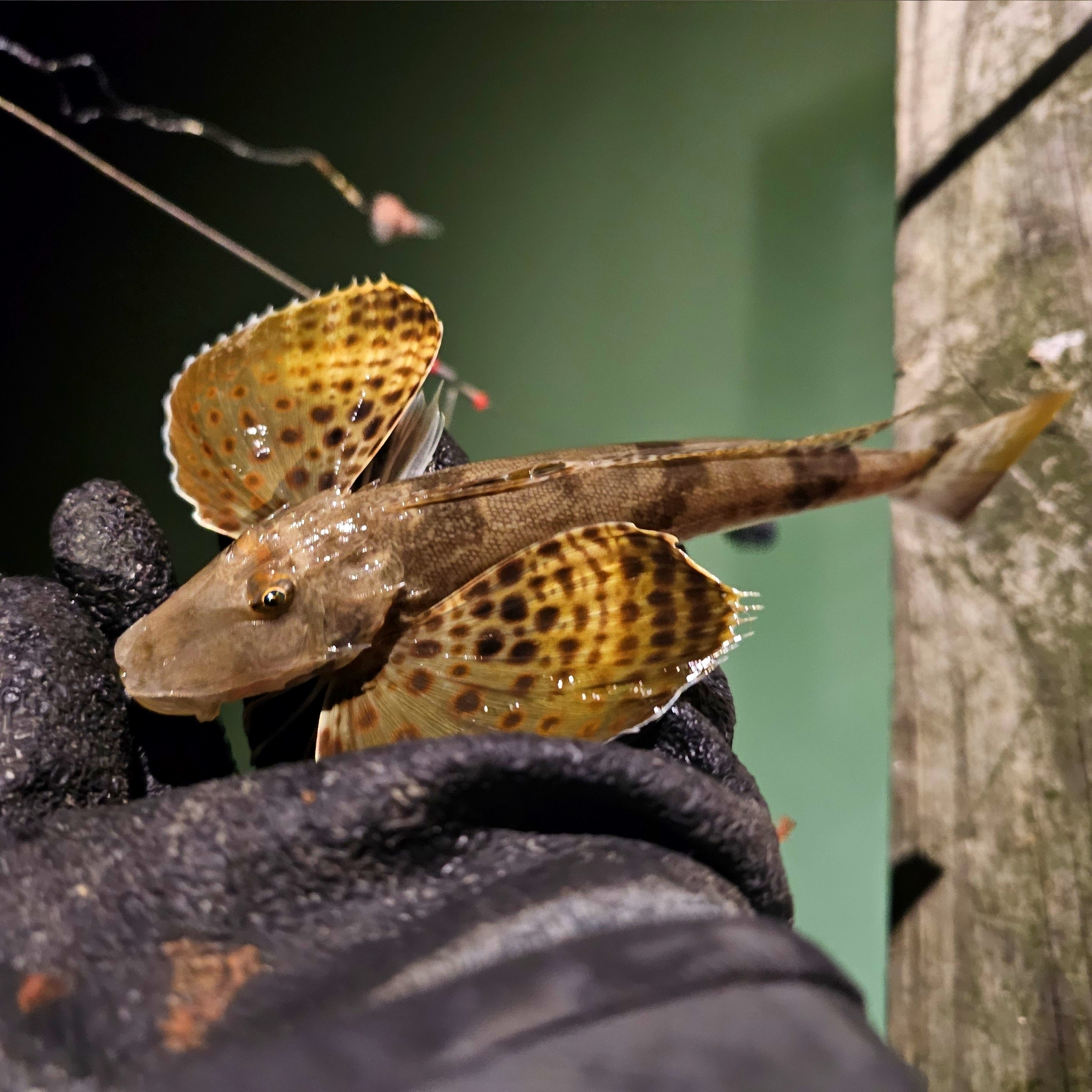
- In North Carolina

Conservation status
- Least Concern (IUCN 3.1)

Scientific classification
- Kingdom: Animalia
- Phylum: Chordata
- Class: Actinopterygii
- Order: Perciformes
- Family: Triglidae
- Genus: Prionotus
- Species: P. scitulus

Binomial name
- Prionotus scitulus D. S. Jordan & Gilbert, 1882

= Prionotus scitulus =

Species of fish

Prionotus scitulus, the leopard sea robin, is a species of marine ray-finned fish belonging to the family Triglidae, the sea robins. This fish is found in the western Atlantic Ocean.

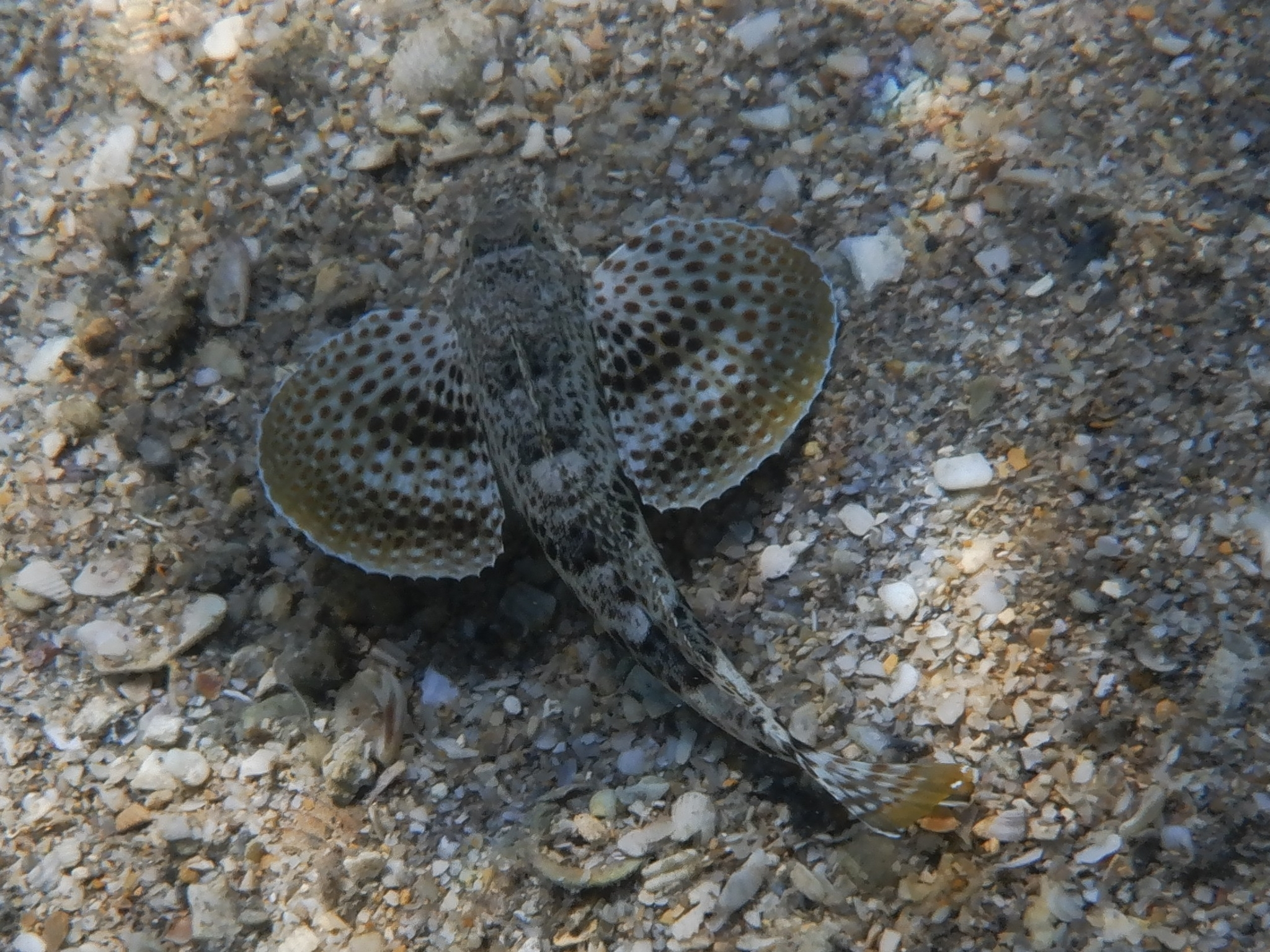
In Florida
