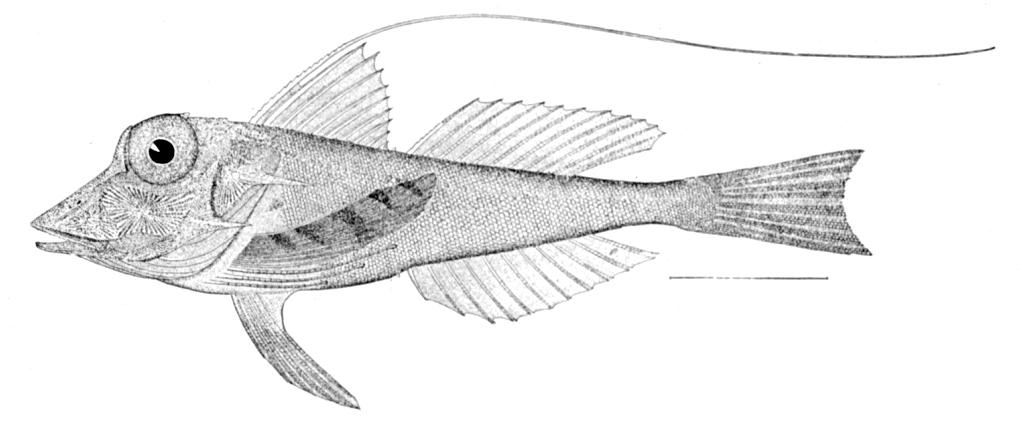
- Streamer searobin, (B. egretta)

Scientific classification
- Kingdom: Animalia
- Phylum: Chordata
- Class: Actinopterygii
- Order: Perciformes
- Family: Triglidae
- Subfamily: Prionotinae
- Genus: Bellator; D. S. Jordan & Evermann, 1896

Type species
- Prionotus militaris Goode & T.H. Bean, 1896

Species
- see text

Synonyms
- Vexillitrigla Whitley, 1931

= Bellator (fish) =

Genus of fishes

Bellator is a genus of marine ray-finned fishes belonging to the family Triglidae, one of two genera belonging to the subfamily Prionotinae, the sea robins. These fishes are found in the Western Atlantic Ocean and eastern Pacific Ocean, in the waters off both North and South America.

== Taxonomy ==
Bellator was first described as a genus in 1896 by the American ichthyologists David Starr Jordan and Barton Warren Evermann, withPrionotus militaris, which had been described earlier in 1896 by George Brown Goode and Tarleton Hoffman Bean from off Cape Catoche in Yucatán, Mexico, designated as its type species and also being its only species. The genus is one of 2 genera classified within the subfamily Prionotinae, the sea robins, in the gurnards family Triglidae. The genus name Bellator means "warrior", reflecting the specific name of the type species, which means "like a soldier", and is thought to be a reference to the elongate first two spines in the dorsal fin.

== Species ==
Eight species in this genus are recognized:

- Bellator brachychir (Regan, 1914) (shortfin sea robin)
- Bellator egretta (Goode & T.H. Bean, 1896) (streamer sea robin)
- Bellator farrago Richards & McCosker, 1998 (Medley searobin)
- Bellator gymnostethus (C. H. Gilbert, 1892) (naked-belly sea robin)
- Bellator loxias (D.S. Jordan, 1897) (barred sea robin)
- Bellator militaris (Goode & T.H. Bean, 1896) (horned sea robin)
- Bellator ribeiroi G. C. Miller, 1965 (Caribbean searobin)
- Bellator xenisma D. S. Jordan & Bollman, 1890 (splitnose sea robin)

== Characteristics ==
Bellator sea robina are characterised by a large, rather square-shaped bony head which bears a number of ridges and spines and has a thin intraorbital space. They may have a terminal or slightly inferior mouth with simple teeth on their jaws and on the roof of the mouth. They have two separate dorsal fins, typically containing 11 spines and 11 soft rays. The main part of the pectoral fins are short with 12 rays and extend to the origin of anal fin and it has the 3 lowermost rays at free and separate from main fin. There are rough scales on the body except that the nape and upper rear flap of the operculum have no scales. The smallest species in the genus is B. ribeiroi which has a maximum published total length of 9.9 cm (3.9 in) and the largest is B. egretta with a maximum published total length of 20 cm (7.9 in).

== Distribution and habitat ==
Bellator sea robins are found in the tropical and temperate waters of the Western Atlantic and Eastern Pacific Oceans off both North and South America. They can be found from rocky shallow waters to significant depths.
