= Hydrodynamic reception =

Ability of an organism to sense water movements

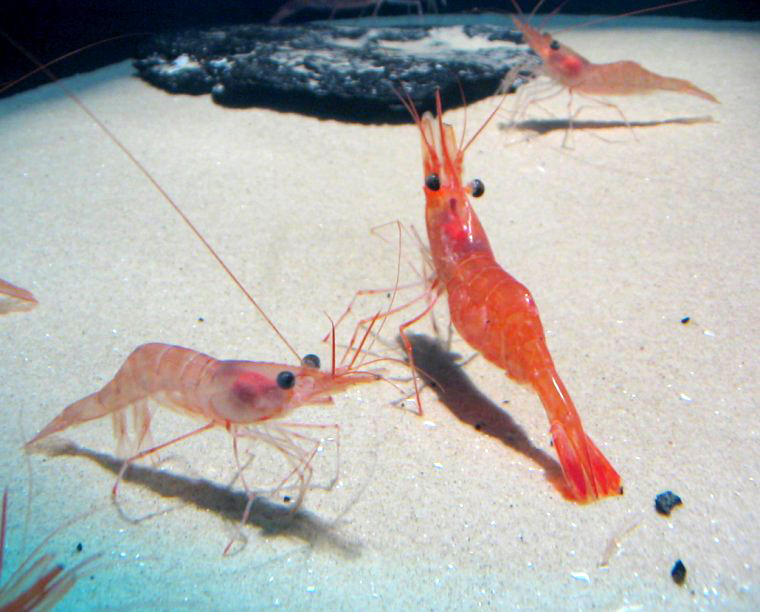
Arthropods like these northern prawn, and some mammals, detect water movement with sensory hairs such as whiskers, bristles or antennae.

In animal physiology, hydrodynamic reception refers to the ability of some animals to sense water movements generated by biotic (conspecifics, predators, or prey) or abiotic sources. This form of mechanoreception is useful for orientation, hunting, predator avoidance, and schooling. Frequent encounters with conditions of low visibility can prevent vision from being a reliable information source for navigation and sensing objects or organisms in the environment. Sensing water movements is one resolution to this problem.

This sense is common in aquatic animals, the most cited example being the lateral line system, the array of hydrodynamic receptors found in fish and aquatic amphibians. Arthropods (including crayfish and lobsters) and some mammals (including pinnipeds and manatees) can use sensory hairs to detect water movements. Systems that detect hydrodynamic stimuli are also used for sensing other stimuli. For example, sensory hairs are also used for the tactile sense, detecting objects and organisms up close rather than via water disturbances from afar. Relative to other sensory systems, our knowledge of hydrodynamic sensing is rather limited. This could be because humans do not have hydrodynamic receptors, which makes it difficult for us to understand the importance of such a system. Generating and measuring a complex hydrodynamic stimulus can also be difficult.

== Overview of hydrodynamic stimuli ==
=== Definition ===
“Hydrodynamic” refers to the motion of water against an object that causes a force to be exerted upon it. A hydrodynamic stimulus is therefore a detectable disturbance caused by objects moving in a fluid. The geometry of the disturbance depends on properties of the object (shape, size, velocity) and also on properties of the fluid, such as viscosity and velocity. These water movements are not only relevant to animals that can detect them, but constitute a branch of physics, fluid dynamics, that has importance in areas such as meteorology, engineering, and astronomy.

A frequent hydrodynamic stimulus is a wake, consisting of eddies and vortices that an organism leaves behind as it swims, affected by the animal's size, swimming pattern, and speed. Although the strength of a wake decreases over time as it moves away from its source, vortex structure of a goldfish's wake can remain for about thirty seconds, and increased water velocity can be detected several minutes after production.

=== Uses of hydrodynamic stimuli ===
Since movement of an object through water inevitably creates movement of the water itself, and this resulting water motion persists and travels, the detection of hydrodynamic stimuli is useful for sensing conspecifics, predators, and prey. Many studies are based upon the question of how an aquatic organism can capture prey despite darkness or apparent lack of visual or other sensory systems and find that the sensing of hydrodynamic stimuli left by prey is probably responsible. As for detection of conspecifics, harbor seal pups will enter the water with their mother, but eventually ascend to obtain oxygen, and then dive again to rejoin the mother. Observations suggest that the tracking of water movements produced by the mother and other pups allows this rejoining to occur. Through these trips and the following of conspecifics, pups might learn routes to avoid predators and good places to find food, showing the possible significance of hydrodynamic detection to these seals.

Hydrodynamic stimuli also function in exploration of the environment. For example, blind cave fish create disturbances in the water and use distortions of this self-generated field to complete spatial tasks, such as avoiding surrounding obstacles.

=== Visualizing hydrodynamic stimuli ===
Since water movements are difficult for humans to observe, researchers can visualize the hydrodynamic stimuli that animals detect via particle image velocimetry (PIV). This technique tracks fluid motions by particles put into the water that can be more easily imaged compared to the water itself. The direction and speed of water movement can be defined quantitatively. This technique assumes that the particles will follow the flow of the water.

== Invertebrates ==
To detect water movement, many invertebrates have sensory cells with cilia that project from the body surface and make direct contact with surrounding water. Typically, the cilia include one kinocilium surrounded by a group of shorter stereocilia. Deflection of stereocilia toward the kinocilium by movement of water around the animal stimulates some sensory cells and inhibits others. Water velocity is thus related to the amount of deflection of certain stereocilia, and sensory cells send information about this deflection to the brain via firing rates of afferent nerves. Cephalopods, including the squid Loligo vulgaris and cuttlefish Sepia officinalis, have ciliated sensory cells arranged in lines at different locations on the body. Although these cephalopods have only kinocilia and no stereocilia, the sensory cells and their arrangement are analogous to the hair cells and lateral line in vertebrates, indicating convergent evolution.

Arthropods are different from other invertebrates as they use surface receptors in the form of mechanosensory setae to function in both touch and hydrodynamic sensing. These receptors can also be deflected by solid objects or water flow. They are located on different body regions depending on the animal, such as on the tail for crayfish and lobsters. Neural excitation occurs when setae are moved in one direction, while inhibition occurs with movement in the opposite direction.

== Fish ==
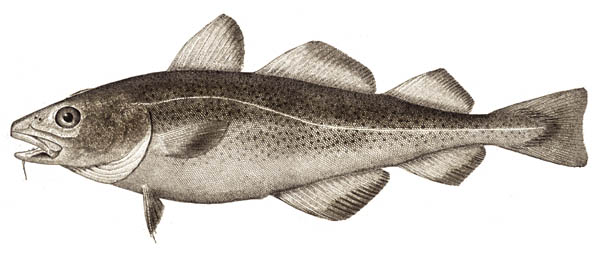
Lateral line on an Atlantic cod

Fish and some aquatic amphibians detect hydrodynamic stimuli via their lateral line organs. This system consists of an array of sensors called neuromasts arranged along the length of the fish's body. Neuromasts can be free-standing (superficial neuromasts) or within fluid-filled canals (canal neuromasts). The sensory cells within neuromasts are polarized hair cells within a gelatinous cupula. The cupula, and the stereocilia within, are moved a certain amount depending on the movement of the surrounding water. Afferent nerve fibers are excited or inhibited depending on whether the hair cells they arise from are deflected in the preferred or opposite direction. Lateral line receptors form somatotopic maps within the brain informing the fish of amplitude and direction of flow at different points along the body. These maps are located in the medial octavolateral nucleus (MON) of the medulla and in higher areas such as the torus semicircularis.

== Mammals ==
Detection of hydrodynamic stimuli in mammals typically occurs through use of hairs (vibrissae) or “push-rod” mechanoreceptors, as in platypuses. When hairs are used, they are often in the form of whiskers and contain a follicle-sinus complex (F-SC), making them different from the hairs with which humans are most familiar.

=== Pinnipeds ===
Pinnipeds, including sea lions and seals, use their mystacial vibrissae (whiskers) for active touch, including size and shape discrimination, and texture discrimination in seals. When used for touch, these vibrissae are moved to the forward position and kept still while the head moves, thus moving the vibrissae on the surface of an object. This is in contrast to rodents, which move the whiskers themselves to explore objects. More recently, research has been done to see if pinnipeds can use these same whiskers to detect hydrodynamic stimuli in addition to tactile stimuli. While this ability has been verified behaviorally, the specific neural circuits involved have not yet been determined.

==== Seals ====
Research on the ability of pinnipeds to detect hydrodynamic stimuli was first done on harbor seals (Phoca vitulina). It had been unclear how seals could find food in dark waters. It was found that a harbor seal that could use only its whiskers for sensory information (due to being blindfolded and wearing headphones), could respond to weak hydrodynamic stimuli produced by an oscillating sphere within the range of frequencies that fish would generate. As with active touch, whiskers are not moved during sensing, but are projected forward and remain in that position.

To find whether seals could actually follow hydrodynamic stimuli using their vibrissae rather than just detect them, a blindfolded harbor seal with headphones can be released into a tank in which a toy submarine has left a hydrodynamic trail. After protracting its vibrissae to the most forward position and making lateral head movements, the seal can locate and follow a trail of 40 meters even when sharp turns to the trail are added. When whisker movements are prevented with a mask covering the muzzle, the seal cannot locate and follow the trail, indicating use of information obtained by the whiskers.

Trails produced by live animals are more complex than that produced by a toy submarine, so the ability of seals to follow trails produced by other seals can also be tested. A seal is capable of following this center of this trail, either following the direct path of the trail or using an undulatory pattern involving crossing the trail repeatedly. This latter pattern might allow the seal to track a fish swimming in a zigzagging motion, or assist with tracking weak trails by comparing the surrounding water with the prospective trail.

Other studies have shown that the harbor seal can distinguish between the hydrodynamic trails left by paddles of different sizes and shapes, a finding in agreement with what the lateral line in goldfish is capable of doing. Discrimination between different fish species might have adaptive value if it allows seals to capture those with highest energy content. Seals can also detect a hydrodynamic trail produced by a fin-like paddle up to 35 seconds old with an accuracy rate greater than chance. Accuracy diminishes as the trail becomes older.

==== Sea lions ====
The California sea lion (Zalophus californianus) have mystacial vibrissae that differ from those of seals, but it can detect and follow a trail made by a small toy submarine. Sea lions use an undulatory pattern of tracking similar to that in seals, but do not perform as well with increased delay before they are allowed to swim and locate the trail.

==== Species differences in vibrissae ====
Studies raise the question of how detection of hydrodynamic stimuli in these animals is possible given the movement of the vibrissae due to water flow during swimming. Whiskers vibrate with a certain frequency based on swim speed and properties of the whisker. Detection of the water disturbance caused by this vibrissal movement should overshadow any stimulus produced by a distant fish due to its proximity. For seals, one proposal is that they might sense changes in the baseline frequency of vibration to detect hydrodynamic stimuli produced by another source. However, a more recent study shows that the morphology of the seal's vibrissae actually prevents vortices produced by the whiskers from creating excessive water disturbances.

In harbor seals, the structure of the vibrissal shaft is undulated (wavy) and flattened. This specialization is also found in most true seals. In contrast, the whiskers of the California sea lion are circular or elliptical in cross-section and are smooth.

When seals swim with their vibrissae projected forward, the flattened, undulated structure prevents the vibrissae from bending backward or vibrating to produce water disturbances. Thus, the seal prevents noise from the whiskers by a unique whisker structure. However, sea lions appear to monitor modulations of the characteristic frequency of the whiskers to obtain information about hydrodynamic stimuli. This different mechanism might be responsible for the sea lion's worse performance in tracking an aging hydrodynamic trail. Since the whiskers of the sea lion must recover its characteristic frequency after the frequency is altered by a hydrodynamic stimulus, this could reduce the whisker's temporal resolution.

=== Manatees ===
Similar to the vibrissae of seals and sea lions, Florida manatees also use hairs for detecting tactile and hydrodynamic stimuli. However, manatees are unique since these tactile hairs are located over the whole post-cranial body in addition to the face. These hairs have different densities at different locations of the body, with higher density on the dorsal side and density decreasing ventrally. The effect of this distribution in spatial resolution is unknown. This system, distributed over the whole body, could localize water movements analogous to a lateral line.

Research is currently being done to test detection of hydrodynamic stimuli in manatees. While the anatomy of the follicle-sinus complexes of manatees have been well studied, there is much to learn about the neural circuits involved if such detection is possible and the way in which the hairs encode information about strength and location of a stimulus via timing differences in firing.

=== Platypuses ===
In contrast to the sinus hairs that other mammals use to detect water movements, evidence indicates that platypuses use specialized mechanoreceptors on the bill called “push-rods”. These look like small domes on the surface, which are the ends of rods that are attached at the base but can move freely otherwise.

Using these push-rods in combination with electroreceptors, also on the bill, allows the platypus to find prey with its eyes closed. While researchers initially believed that the push-rods could only function when something is in contact with the bill (implicating their use for a tactile sense), it is now believed that they can also be used at a distance to detect hydrodynamic stimuli. The information from push-rods and electroreceptors combine in the somatosensory cortex in a structure with stripes similar to the ocular dominance columns for vision. In the third layer of this structure, sensory inputs from push-rods and electroreceptors may combine so that the platypus can use the time difference between arrival of each type of signal at the bill (with hydrodynamic stimuli arriving after electrical signals) to determine the location of prey. That is, different cortical neurons could encode the delay between detection of electrical and hydrodynamic stimuli. However, a specific neural mechanism for this is not yet known.

=== Other mammals ===
The family Talpidae includes the moles, shrew moles, and desmans. Most members of this family have Eimer's organs, touch-sensitive structures on the snout. The desmans are semi-aquatic and have small sensory hairs that have been compared to the neuromasts of the lateral line. These hairs are termed “microvibrissae” due to their small size, ranging from 100 to 200 micrometers. They are located with the Eimer's organs on the snout and might sense water movements.

Soricidae, a sister family of Talpidae, contains the American water shrew. This animal can obtain prey during the night despite the darkness. To discover how this is possible, a study controlling for use of electroreception, sonar, or echolocation showed that this water shrew is capable of detecting water disturbances made by potential prey. This species probably uses its vibrissae for hydrodynamic (and tactile) sensing based on behavioral observations and their large cortical representation.

While not well studied, the Rakali (Australian water rat) may also be able to detect water movements with its vibrissae as these have a large amount of innervation, though further behavioral studies are needed to confirm this.

While tying the presence of whiskers to hydrodynamic reception has allowed the list of mammals with this special sense to grow, more research still needs to be done on the specific neural circuits involved.
