= Sensory systems in fish =

Most fish possess highly developed sense organs. Nearly all fish that are primarily active during daylight have colour vision that is at least as good as a human's. Many fish also have chemoreceptors responsible for extraordinary senses of taste and smell. Their hearing is adapted to the underwater environment, using bone conduction, the swim bladder, and the inner ear. Most fish have sensitive receptors that form the lateral line system, which detects gentle currents and vibrations, and senses the motion of nearby fish and prey. Sharks can sense frequencies in the range of 25 to 50 Hz through their lateral line.

Fish orient themselves using landmarks and may use mental maps based on multiple landmarks or symbols. Fish behavior in mazes reveals that they possess spatial memory and visual discrimination.

== Vision ==
Diagrammatic vertical section through the eye of teleost fish. Fish have a refractive index gradient within the lens which compensates for spherical aberration. Unlike humans, most fish adjust focus by moving the lens closer or further from the retina. Teleosts do so by contracting the retractor lentis muscle.

Vision is an important sensory system for most species of fish. Fish eyes are similar to those of terrestrial vertebrates like birds and mammals, but have a more spherical lens. Their retinas generally have both rod cells and cone cells (for scotopic and photopic vision), and most species have colour vision. Some fish can see ultraviolet and some can see polarized light. Amongst jawless fish, the lamprey has well-developed eyes, while the hagfish has only primitive eyespots. Fish vision shows adaptation to their visual environment, for example deep sea fishes have eyes suited to the dark environment.

Fish and other aquatic animals live in a different light environment than terrestrial species. Water absorbs light so that with increasing depth the amount of light available decreases quickly. The optic properties of water also lead to different wavelengths of light being absorbed to different degrees, for example light of long wavelengths (e.g. red, orange) is absorbed quite quickly compared to light of short wavelengths (blue, violet), though ultraviolet light (even shorter wavelength than blue) is absorbed quite quickly as well. Besides these universal qualities of water, different bodies of water may absorb light of different wavelengths because of salts and other chemicals in the water.

== Hearing, motion, and pressure ==
Hearing is an important sensory system for most species of fish. For example, in the family Batrachoididae, males use their swim bladders to make advertisement calls which females use to localize males. Hearing threshold and the ability to localize sound sources are reduced underwater, in which sound travels faster than in air. Underwater hearing is by bone conduction, and localization of sound appears to depend on differences in amplitude detected by bone conduction. As such, aquatic animals such as fish have a more specialized hearing apparatus that is effective underwater.

Fish sense sound primarily through their otoliths (inner ears). In some fishes, such as some species of carp and herring, hearing is enhanced by a connection between their swim bladder and inner ear. The lateral line consists of a series of receptors along the side of a fish's body, open to the environment via a series of openings called lateral line pores. The lateral line can also play a role in hearing.

Fishes can be characterised into six hearing groups for assessing their susceptibility to underwater sound, depending on the involvement of the swim bladder in hearing. For three groups (denoted P1, P2 and P3), the swim bladder is involved in hearing, which is thus sensitive to sound pressure. For the other three groups (A2, A3 and A4), the swim bladder is either not present or not involved in hearing and the hearing responds not to sound pressure but to sound particle acceleration.

Fish hearing groups sensitive to sound pressure are P1 (swim bladder without adaptation such as the cod or haddock), P2 (swim bladder with a mechanical connection to the inner ear such as the Weberian ossicle), e.g., goldfish and zebrafish and P3 (swim bladder with ultrasonic adaptation, bubble near ear, or a standard ear such as shad, menhaden). Hearing group A4 comprises bony fishes with a swim bladder not involved in hearing such as sturgeon and salmon. Fish hearing groups without a swim bladder are A2 (cartilaginous fishes such as shark and skate) and A3 (bony fishes without a swim bladder, such as dab and mackerel).

Pressure detection uses the organ of Weber, a system consisting of three appendages of vertebrae transferring changes in shape of the gas bladder to the middle ear. It can be used to regulate the buoyancy of the fish. Fish like the weather fish and other loaches are also known to respond to low pressure areas but they lack a swim bladder.

== Current detection ==
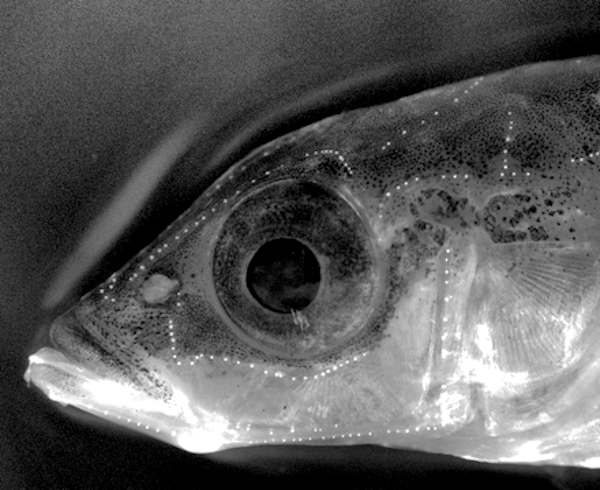
A three-spined stickleback with stained neuromasts

The lateral line in fish and aquatic forms of amphibians is a detection system of water currents, consisting mostly of vortices. The lateral line is also sensitive to low-frequency vibrations. It is used primarily for navigation, hunting, and schooling. The mechanoreceptors are hair cells, the same mechanoreceptors for vestibular sense and hearing. Hair cells in fish are used to detect water movements around their bodies. These hair cells are embedded in a jelly-like protrusion called cupula. The hair cells therefore can not be seen and do not appear on the surface of skin. The receptors of the electrical sense are modified hair cells of the lateral line system.

Fish and some aquatic amphibians detect hydrodynamic stimuli via a lateral line. This system consists of an array of sensors called neuromasts along the length of the fish's body. Neuromasts can be free-standing (superficial neuromasts) or within fluid-filled canals (canal neuromasts). The sensory cells within neuromasts are polarized hair cells contained within a gelatinous cupula. The cupula, and the stereocilia which are the "hairs" of hair cells, are moved by a certain amount depending on the movement of the surrounding water. Afferent nerve fibers are excited or inhibited depending on whether the hair cells they arise from are deflected in the preferred or opposite direction. Lateral line neurons form somatotopic maps within the brain informing the fish of amplitude and direction of flow at different points along the body. These maps are located in the medial octavolateral nucleus (MON) of the medulla and in higher areas such as the torus semicircularis.

== Chemoreception (smelling) ==
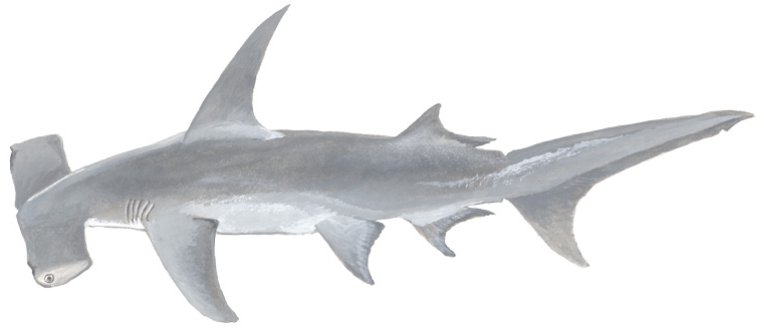
The shape of the hammerhead shark's head enhances olfaction by spacing the nostrils further apart.

The aquatic equivalent to smelling in air is tasting in water. Many larger catfish have chemoreceptors across their entire bodies, which means they "taste" anything they touch and "smell" any chemicals in the water. "In catfish, gustation plays a primary role in the orientation and location of food".

Salmon have a strong sense of smell. Speculation about whether odours provide homing cues, go back to the 19th century. In 1951, Hasler hypothesised that, once in vicinity of the estuary or entrance to its birth river, salmon may use chemical cues which they can smell, and which are unique to their natal stream, as a mechanism to home onto the entrance of the stream. In 1978, Hasler and his students convincingly showed that the way salmon locate their home rivers with such precision was indeed because they could recognise its characteristic smell. They further demonstrated that the smell of their river becomes imprinted in salmon when they transform into smolts, just before they migrate out to sea. Homecoming salmon can also recognise characteristic smells in tributary streams as they move up the main river. They may also be sensitive to characteristic pheromones given off by juvenile conspecifics. There is evidence that they can "discriminate between two populations of their own species".

Sharks have keen olfactory senses, located in the short duct (which is not fused, unlike bony fish) between the anterior and posterior nasal openings, with some species able to detect as little as one part per million of blood in seawater. Sharks have the ability to determine the direction of a given scent based on the timing of scent detection in each nostril. This is similar to the method mammals use to determine the direction of sound. They are more attracted to the chemicals found in the intestines of many species, and as a result often linger near or in sewage outfalls. Some species, such as nurse sharks, have external barbels that greatly increase their ability to sense prey.

The MHC genes are a group of genes present in many animals and important for the immune system; in general, offspring from parents with differing MHC genes have a stronger immune system. Fish are able to smell some aspect of the MHC genes of potential sex partners and prefer partners with MHC genes different from their own.

== Electroreception and magnetoreception ==
Electroreception is the ability to detect electric fields or currents. Some fish, such as catfish and sharks, have organs that detect weak electric potentials on the order of millivolts. Other fish, like the South American electric fishes Gymnotiformes, can produce weak electric currents, which they use in navigation and social communication. In sharks, the ampullae of Lorenzini are electroreceptor organs. They number in the hundreds to thousands. Sharks use the ampullae of Lorenzini to detect the electromagnetic fields that all living things produce. This helps sharks (particularly the hammerhead shark) find prey. The shark has the greatest electrical sensitivity of any animal. Sharks find prey hidden in sand by detecting the electric fields they produce. Ocean currents moving in the magnetic field of the Earth also generate electric fields that sharks can use for orientation and possibly navigation. Among teleosts, the electric catfish uses electroreception to navigate through muddy waters. These fish make use of spectral changes and amplitude modulation to determine factors such shape, size, distance, velocity, and conductivity. The abilities of the electric fish to communicate and identify sex, age, and hierarchy within the species are also made possible through electric fields. EF gradients as low as 5 nV/cm can be found in some saltwater weakly electric fish. Several basal bony fishes, including the paddlefish (Polyodon spathula), possess electroreceptors. The paddlefish hunts plankton using thousands of tiny passive electroreceptors located on its extended snout, or rostrum. The paddlefish is able to detect electric fields that oscillate at 0.5–20 Hz, and large groups of plankton generate this type of signal.

Magnetoreception is the ability to detect the direction one is facing based on the Earth's magnetic field. In 1988, researchers found iron, in the form of single domain magnetite, in the skulls of sockeye salmon. The quantities present are sufficient for magnetoreception.

Electromagnetic field receptors (ampullae of Lorenzini) and motion detecting canals in the head of a shark

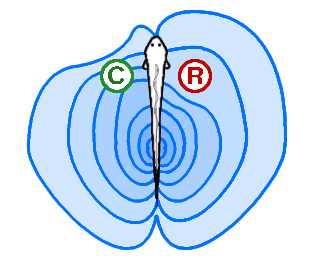
Active electrolocation. Conductive objects concentrate the field and resistive objects spread the field.

== Fish navigation ==
Salmon regularly migrate thousands of miles to and from their breeding grounds.

Salmon spend their early life in rivers, and then swim out to sea where they live their adult lives and gain most of their body mass. After several years wandering huge distances in the ocean where they mature, most surviving salmons return to the same natal rivers to spawn. Usually they return with uncanny precision to the river where they were born: most of them swim up the rivers until they reach the very spawning ground that was their original birthplace.

There are various theories about how this happens. One theory is that there are geomagnetic and chemical cues which the salmon use to guide them back to their birthplace. It is thought that, when they are in the ocean, they use magnetoception related to Earth's magnetic field to orient itself in the ocean and locate the general position of their natal river, and once close to the river, that they use their sense of smell to home in on the river entrance and even their natal spawning ground.

== Pain ==
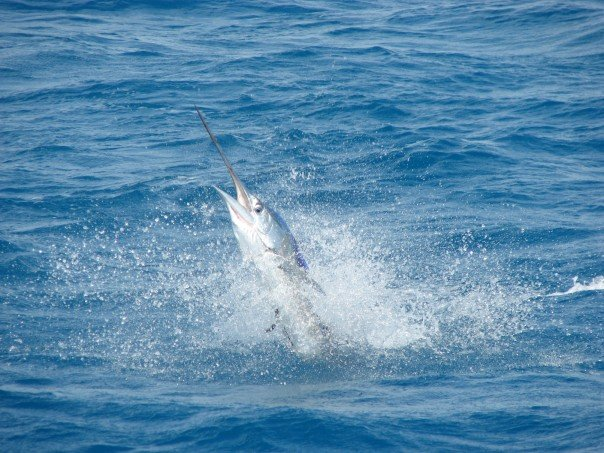
Hooked sailfish

Pain receptors in fish are specialised sensory nerve endings called nociceptors that detect potentially tissue-damaging stimuli — such as extreme heat, intense pressure, or chemical irritation — and transmit signals through the nervous system.

Experiments done by William Tavolga provide evidence that fish have pain and fear responses. For instance, in Tavolga's experiments, toadfish grunted when electrically shocked and over time they came to grunt at the mere sight of an electrode.

In 2003, Scottish scientists at the University of Edinburgh and the Roslin Institute concluded that rainbow trout exhibit behaviors often associated with pain in other animals. Bee venom and acetic acid injected into the lips resulted in fish rocking their bodies and rubbing their lips along the sides and floors of their tanks, which the researchers concluded were attempts to relieve pain, similar to what mammals would do. Neurons fired in a pattern resembling human neuronal patterns.

Professor James D. Rose of the University of Wyoming claimed the study was flawed since it did not provide proof that fish possess "conscious awareness, particularly a kind of awareness that is meaningfully like ours". Rose argues that since fish brains are so different from human brains, fish are probably not conscious in the manner humans are, so that reactions similar to human reactions to pain instead have other causes. Rose had published a study a year earlier arguing that fish cannot feel pain because their brains lack a neocortex. However, animal behaviorist Temple Grandin argues that fish could still have consciousness without a neocortex because "different species can use different brain structures and systems to handle the same functions."

Animal welfare advocates raise concerns about the possible suffering of fish caused by angling. Some countries, such as Germany have banned specific types of fishing, and the British RSPCA now prosecutes individuals who are cruel to fish.

== See also ==
- Active sensory systems
- Brain
- Hydrodynamic reception
- Kinocilium
- Olfactory system
- Perception
- Proprioception
- Sense
- Sensory ecology
- Sensory-motor coupling
- Sensory neuron
- Sensory neuroscience
- Sensory organs of gastropods
- Sensory receptor
- Somatosensory system
- Visual system

== Further references ==
- Collin SP and Marshall NJ (Eds) (2003) Sensory Processing in Aquatic Environments Springer. ISBN 9780387955278.
- Green, W. W. and Zielinski B. S. (2013) "Chemoreception" In: D H Evans, J B Claiborne and S Currie (Eds) The Physiology of Fishes, 4th edition, pp. 345–373, CRC Press. ISBN 9781439880302.
- Popper AN and Fay RR (1993) "Sound detection and processing by fish: critical review and major research questions" (2 parts) Brain, behavior and evolution, 41 (1): 14–25. doi:10.1159/000338719 PDF part 1 PDF part 2
- Stevens, Martin (2013) Sensory Ecology, Behaviour, and Evolution Oxford University Press. ISBN 9780199601783.
- Webb JF, Fay RR and Popper AN (2008) Fish Bioacoustics Springer. ISBN 9780387730288.
