= Torus semicircularis =

The torus semicircularis is a region of the vertebrate midbrain that contributes to auditory perception, studied most often in fish and amphibians. It corresponds to the inferior colliculus.

Neurons from the medulla project to the nucleus centralis and the nucleus ventrolateralis in the torus semicircularis, providing afferent auditory and hydrodynamic information. Research suggests that these nuclei interact with each other, suggesting that this area of the brain is bimodally sensitive. In the Gymnotiform fish, which are weakly electric fish, the torus semicircularis was observed to exhibit laminar organization. It receives afferent input, specifically electrosensory, mechanical, and auditory stimuli. In frogs, researchers have studied how neurons in the torus semicircularis prefer certain characteristics of sound differentially. Single neurons fire selectively based on the auditory parameters of a stimulus. Functionally, this can allow members of a species to distinguish whether a call is of the same (conspecific) or a different species. This has been observed to play a role in mate selection. In the Tungara frog, which produces a species-specific mating call, scientists studied responses in the laminar nucleus of the torus semicircularis to various parts of the call. They came to the conclusion that this part of the brain acts as a feature detector (a neuron/neurons that respond to a certain feature of a stimulus) for the parts of the auditory stimulus that are conspecific. From an evolutionary standpoint, research has been conducted in turtles to connect the distribution of calcium-binding proteins in the torus semicircularis among birds and mammals to a common reptile predecessor.
