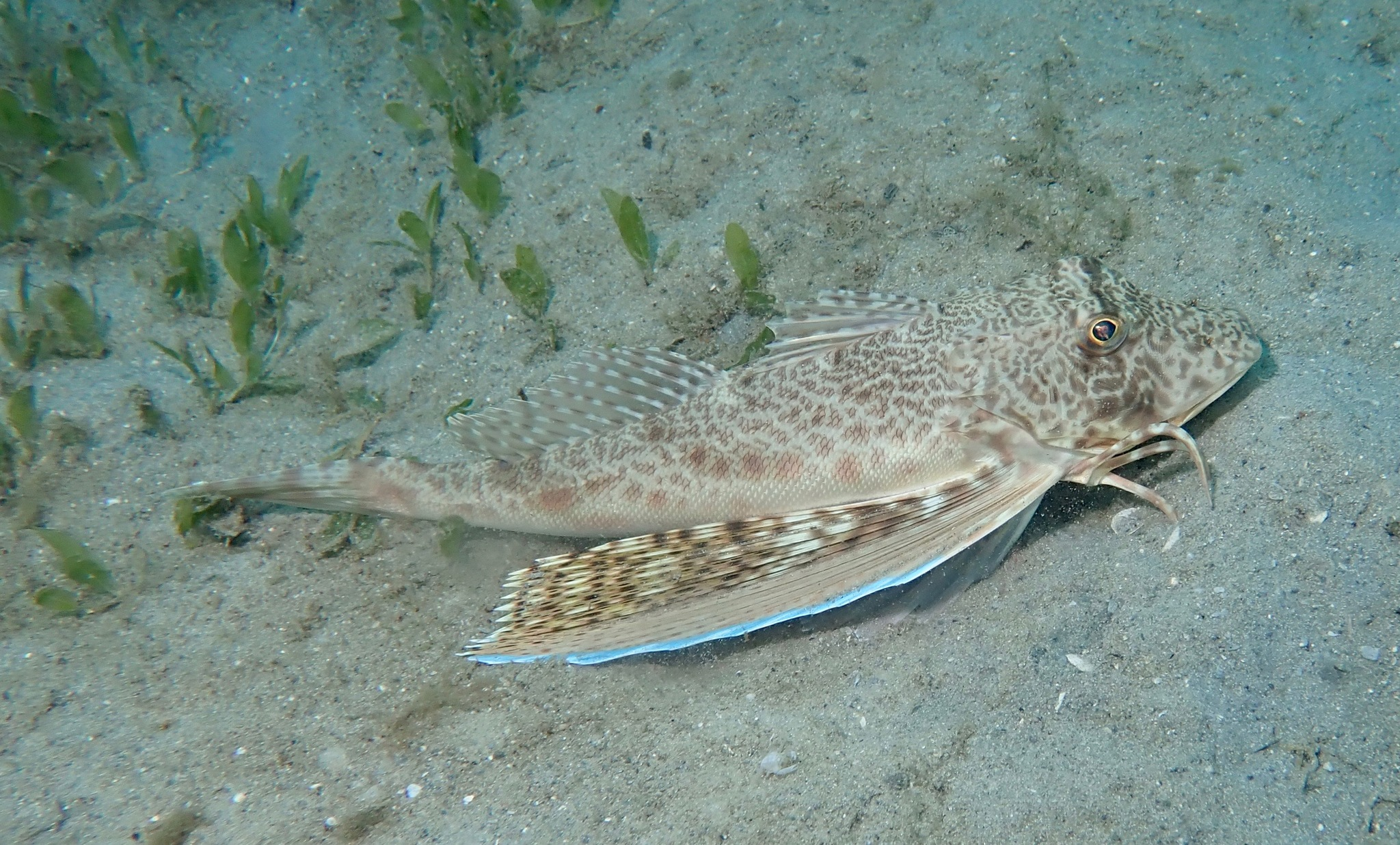
- Bluewing searobin (Prionotus punctatus)
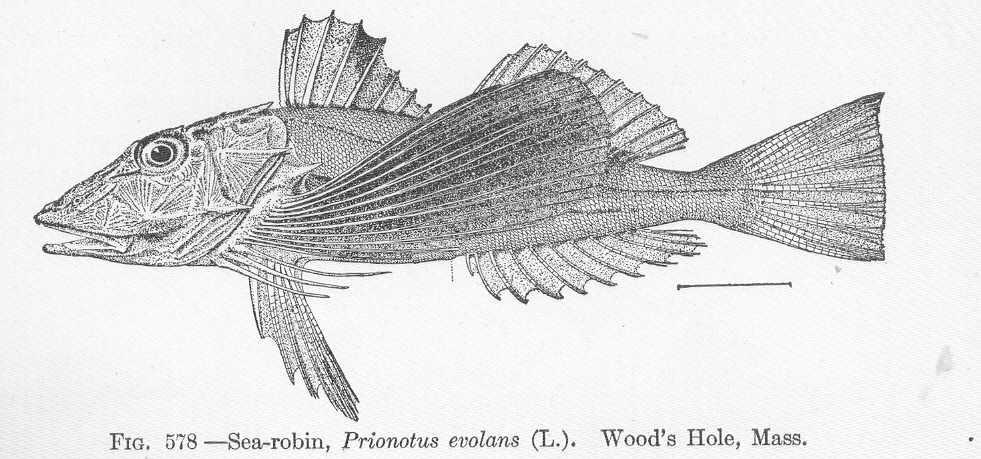
- Striped sea robin (Prionotus evolans)

Scientific classification
- Kingdom: Animalia
- Phylum: Chordata
- Class: Actinopterygii
- Division: Teleostei
- Order: Perciformes
- Family: Triglidae
- Subfamily: Prionotinae; Kaup, 1873

Genera
- see text

= Prionotinae =

Subfamily of marine fishes

Prionotinae is a subfamily of demersal, marine ray-finned fishes, part of the family Triglidae. The fishes in this subfamily are called sea robins and are found in the Western Atlantic and Eastern Pacific Oceans, the other two Triglid subfamilies are called gurnards.

== Taxonomy ==
Prionotinae was first proposed as a subfamily in 1873 by the German naturalist Johann Jakob Kaup. It is classified within the family Triglidae, part of the suborder Platycephaloidei within the order Scorpaeniformes. Prionotinae is regarded as the basal grouping within the family Triglidae.

=== Etymology ===
The name of the subfamily is derived from what was its only genus at the time of its delineation by Kaup, Prionotus. This name is a compound of prion, "saw", and notus, "back", as Lacépède saw three free dorsal spines when he was describing the type species P. evolans but these were probably the result of damage to the specimen. The common names, sea robin, comes from the orange ventral surface of the species in the genus Prionotus, and from large pectoral fins which resemble a bird's wings.

=== Genera ===
Prionotinae contains the following 2 genera:

- Bellator Jordan & Evermann, 1896
- Prionotus Lacépède, 1801

== Characteristics ==
Prionotinae, sea robins, are separated from the other Triglid subfamilies by the lateral line not being forked on the caudal peduncle, having 26 vertebrae and the presence of a ligament, called Baudelot's ligament, which has its base on the skull. The largest species is the lumptail sea robin (Prionotus stephanophrys) which has a maximum published total length of 43 cm (17 in), and the smallest is the Bellator ribeiroi at 9.9 cm (3.9 in) in maximum published total length. Sea robins possess highly specialized leg-like or finger-like appendages derived from their pectoral fins. They lack internal tendons; instead, their movements are controlled entirely by modified muscles located in the pectoral girdle. This allows them to "walk" or "scuttle" across the seabed.

== Distribution and habitat ==
Prionnotinae sea robins are found off the coasts of the Americas in the eastern Pacific and Western Atlantic Oceans. These species occur in depths between 1 m and 210 m, most frequently between 10 m and 50 m deep. They are demersal in temperate waters, but pelagic or semi-pelagic in tropical regions where they form large schools close to the surface. They are demersal fish of sandy bottoms in shallow waters.
