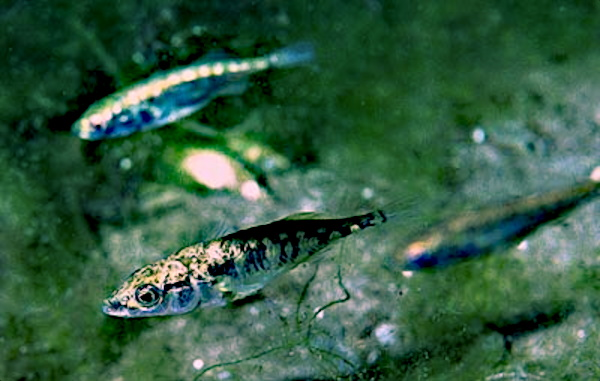
- Three-spined sticklebacks, Gasterosteus aculeatus

Scientific classification
- Kingdom: Animalia
- Phylum: Chordata
- Class: Actinopterygii
- Division: Teleostei
- Order: Perciformes
- Suborder: Gasterosteoidei; Pietsch, 1978

Type species
- Gasterosteus aculeatus Linnaeus, 1758

Families
- See text

= Gasterosteoidei =

Gasterosteoidei Temporal range: Middle Miocene–present

Suborder of ray-finned fishes

Gasterosteoidei is a suborder of ray-finned fishes that includes the sticklebacks and relatives. It belongs to the order Perciformes.

== Systematics ==
Gasterosteoidei is treated as a suborder within the order Scorpaeniformes in the 5th edition of Fishes of the World, but in other phylogenetic classifications it is treated as the infraorder Gasterosteales within the suborder Cottoidei or as a sister clade to the Zoarcales in the order Zoarciformes. Indostomidae is included within Gasterosteoidei in Fishes of the World' but according to Betancur et al. its inclusion in the clade renders it paraphyletic and they classify that family within the monotypic suborder Indostomoidei within the Synbranchiformes.

Historically, Gasterosteoidei was treated as a suborder within the order Gasterostiformes and often included the sea horses, pipefishes and their relatives as suborder Syngnathoidei, with the sticklebacks and relatives in the suborder Gasterosteoidei. The Gasterosteiformes sensu lato were regarded as paraphyletic with the Scorpaeniformes. The more typical members of that group (e.g. scorpionfishes) are apparently closer to the "true" Gasterosteiformes, whereas the keel-bodied flying gurnards (Dactylopteridae) seem actually to belong to the Syngnathiformes clade. It seems that the closest living relatives of the narrowly delimited Gasterosteoidei are the Zoarcoidei, which have been placed in the massively paraphyletic "Perciformes". The Zoarcoidei, as well as the related Trichodontidae, would then appear to be derived offshoots of the scorpaeniform-gasterosteiform radiation which have apomorphically lost the bone "armour" found in their relatives.

Fossils of Gasterosteus and Aulichthys are known from the Middle Miocene, suggesting that the family must have undergone the radiation into its component families prior to this point.

== Families and genera ==
Gasterosteoidei contains the following families and genera:

- Family Hypoptychidae Steindachner, 1880 (sand-eels)
  - Aulichthys Brevoort, 1862
  - Hypoptychus Steindachner, 1880
- Family Gasterosteidae Bonaparte, 1831 (Sticklebacks)
  - Apeltes DeKay, 1842
  - Culaea Whitley, 1950
  - Gasterosteus Linnaeus, 1758
  - Pungitius d'Annone, 1760
  - Spinachia Cuvier, 1816
- Family Aulorhynchidae Gill, 1861 (tubesnouts)
  - Aulorhynchus Gill, 1861

The position of Aulichthys varies based on the phylogenetic methods used, with some studies placing it in the Hypoptychidae and others placing it in the Aulorhynchidae. Presently, Eschmeyer's Catalog of Fishes keeps it in the Hypoptychidae.

== Characteristics ==
Gasterosteoidei is characterised by the possession of a protractile upper jaw and a well developed upward pointing process on the premaxilla. The body is often armoured with dermal plates and paired dermal plates grow from membranes growing out from the pelvic girdle. If there are plates on the flanks these are often a single row of ossified lateral and dermal plates. Unpaired plates paired pelvic plates arising from a membranous outgrowth of the pelvic girdle; lateral body plates, when present, are represented by a single series of lateral and dermal ossifications. The unpaired plates on the body which create the dorsal and ventral series grow from the expanded proximal middle radials of the pterygiphores of the dorsal and anal fins. Separate pectoral radials do not develop during the fish's development and the pectoral radial plate is fused into a single unit on the scapulo-coracoid. They have very small mouths. There are between 1 and 6 branchiostegal rays and there is no postcleithrum in the pelvic girdle which is never joined directly to the cleithra. There are other skeletal features that these fishes share too. The kidneys of gasterosteoids synthesis an adhesive chemical which is used by males to create nests of plant material, it is not known if this is true of all the taxa within the group. These are all rather small fishes with the largest species being the sea stickleback (Spinachia spinachia) which has a maximum published standard length of 22 cm (8.7 in).

== Distribution and habitat ==
Gasterodteoidei are found in the northern hemisphere, mostly within the temperate and Arctic regions. Gasterosteidae is found in fresh, brackish and salt water, while the other two families are marine.

== Timeline of genera ==
Source:
