= Tubenose =

Tubenose may refer to:

- Birds in the order Procellariiformes.
- Fishes in the family Aulorhynchidae.
- Aulichthys japonicus, a fish in the family Hypoptychidae
