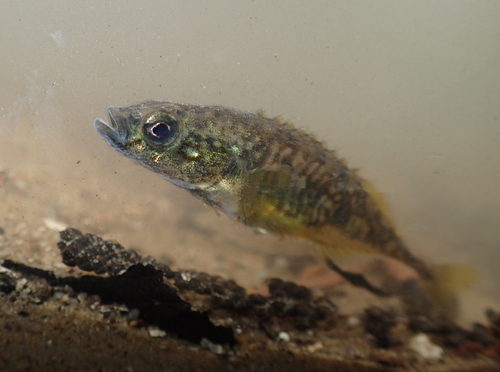

Conservation status
- Least Concern (IUCN 3.1)

Scientific classification
- Kingdom: Animalia
- Phylum: Chordata
- Class: Actinopterygii
- Order: Perciformes
- Family: Gasterosteidae
- Genus: Pungitius
- Species: P. laevis

Binomial name
- Pungitius laevis G. Cuvier, 1829

Synonyms
- Gasterosteus breviceps Blanchard, 1866; Gasterosteus burgundianus Blanchard, 1866; Gasterosteus globiceps Sauvage, 1874; Gasterosteus laevis Cuvier, 1829; Gasterosteus lotharingus Blanchard, 1866; Gasterosteus vulgaris Mauduyt, 1848; Pungitius vulgaris (Mauduyt, 1848); Pygosteus pungitius subsp. hologymna Bertin, 1925

= Pungitius laevis =

Species of fish

Pungitius laevis, commonly known as smoothtail ninespine stickleback, is a species of freshwater fish of the family Gasterosteidae. It is distributed in temperate brackish benthopelagic waters of coastal western Europe.

== Taxonomy ==
Pungitius laevis was first formally described as Gasterosteus laevis in 1829 by the French zoologist Georges Cuvier with its type locality given as the basin of the Seine at Bobigny. This taxon has been considered to be conspecific with the ninespine stickleback (P. pungitius), sometimes treated as a western European subspecies of that holarctic species. The specific name, laevis, means "smooth" and allusion to the lack of scutes on the caudal peduncle.

== Description ==
Pungitius laevis have a concave snout head shape, truncate caudal fin, and elongated body shape. It has a total of nine dorsal spines and 10-11 pectoral fin rays. Adults typically have a coloration of bright green with darker green tints which are covered by black blotches. This species has a maximum published standard length of 8 cm (3.1 in).

== Distribution and habitat ==
Pungitius laevis is found in western Europe in Ireland, southern Great Britain and from the Netherlands to the Garonne in France where it is found in densely vegetated shallow, still waters. It is a benthopelagic species which is found in fresh, brackish and marine waters.

== Biology ==
Adult specimen prefer still, densely vegetated shallow water where they have access to zooplankton, benthic insects, and small crustaceans.

== Reproduction ==
Breeding season lasts from April to June, with males being responsible for nesting and guarding the eggs before they hatch. Nests are usually built by vegetation, and eggs usually take around 10 to 20 days to hatch. Males die at the end of breeding season.
