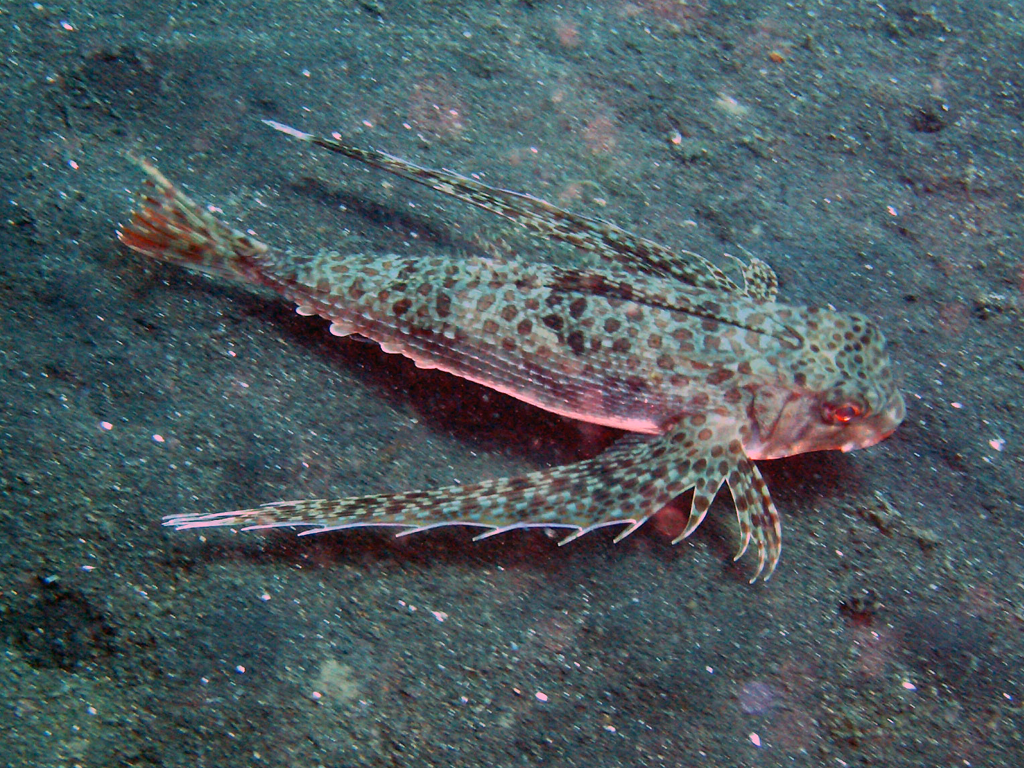

Conservation status
- Least Concern (IUCN 3.1)

Scientific classification
- Kingdom: Animalia
- Phylum: Chordata
- Class: Actinopterygii
- Order: Syngnathiformes
- Family: Dactylopteridae
- Genus: Dactyloptena
- Species: D. macracantha

Binomial name
- Dactyloptena macracantha (Bleeker, 1854)

Synonyms
- Dactylopterus macracanthus Bleeker, 1855

= Spotwing flying gurnard =

Species of fish

The spotwing flying gurnard (Dactyloptena macracantha) is an unusual looking fish because of its huge pectoral fins. The fish has dark spots and wavy lines on the fins. It has a dull head and a grey or sometimes brown body that is covered with dark brown or black spots.

Despite its name, the spotwing flying gurnard is not related to the true flyingfish; these are in the family Exocoetidae, order Beloniformes. Neither is it able to fly, or even to glide as the true flyingfish do.

These fish can grow to 38 cm in length. They feed on crustaceans, clams and small fishes. They have feeler-like leading rays and extensions from each fin ray. When disturbed, they quickly expand their pectoral fins, often retracting them before swimming off at speed.

Although the flying gurnard does not fly, it can "walk" on the bottom by alternatively moving its pelvic fins and short pectoral fin rays.

This Indo-Pacific species occurs from the northern Indian Ocean to Japan.
