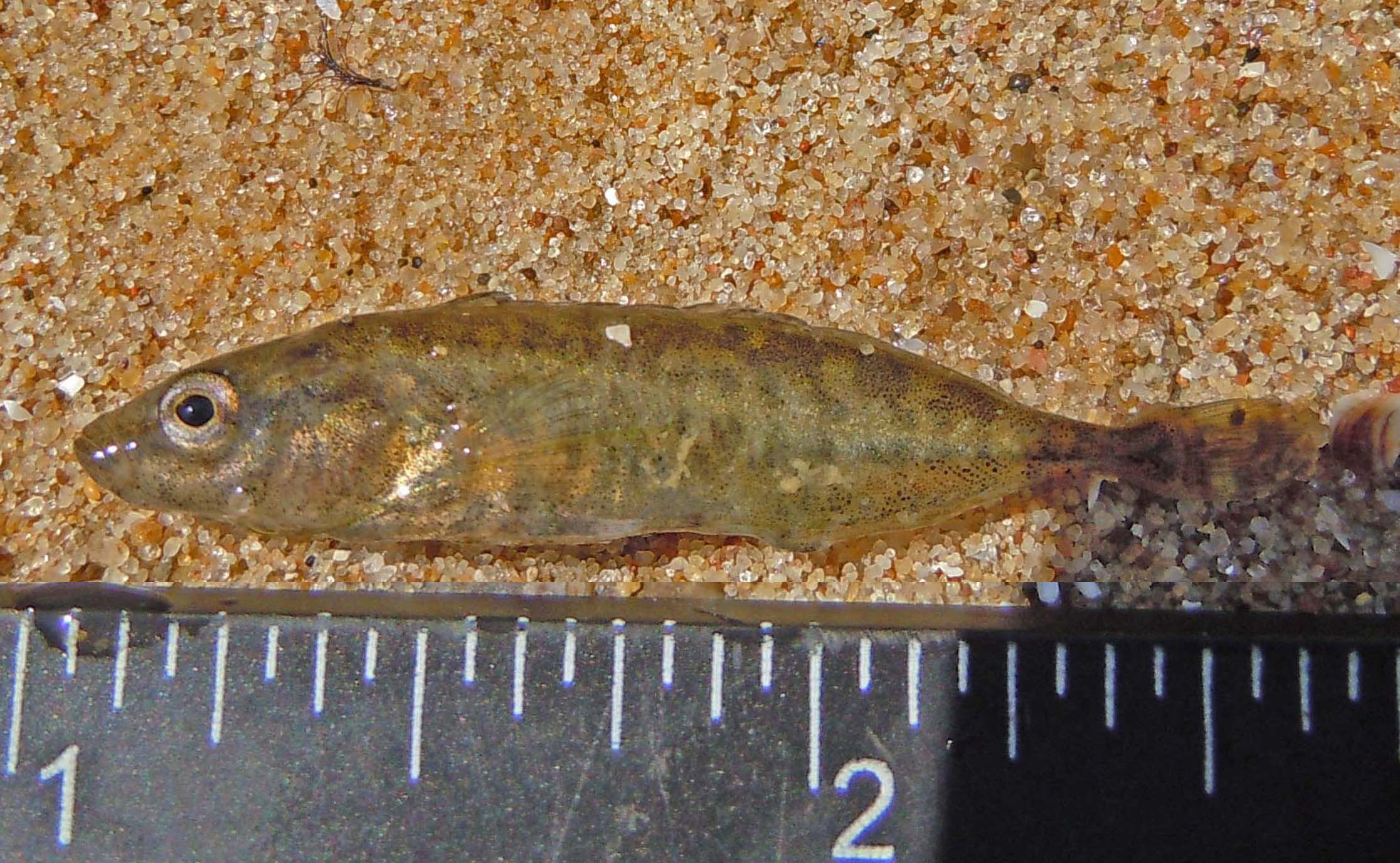
- Ukrainian stickleback from the Dniester Estuary, Ukraine

Conservation status
- Least Concern (IUCN 3.1)

Scientific classification
- Kingdom: Animalia
- Phylum: Chordata
- Class: Actinopterygii
- Division: Teleostei
- Order: Perciformes
- Family: Gasterosteidae
- Genus: Pungitius
- Species: P. platygaster

Binomial name
- Pungitius platygaster (Kessler, 1859)

Synonyms
- Gasterosteus platygaster Kessler, 1859; Gasterosteus platygaster aralensis Kessler, 1877; Gasterosteus platygaster caucasicus Kessler, 1877; Gasterosteus platygaster danubica Steindachner, 1899; Gasterosteus platygaster kessleri Yakovlev, 1870; Gasterosteus platygaster niger Yakovlev, 1870; Gasterosteus pungitius niger Yakovlev, 1870; Pungitius platygaster aralensis (Kessler, 1877); Pygosteus platygaster nuda Berg, 1905

= Ukrainian stickleback =

Species of fish

The Ukrainian stickleback (Pungitius platygaster) also known as the southern ninespine stickleback, southern nine-spined stickleback, Aral stickleback, and pontic stickleback, is a species of fish in the family Gasterosteidae. It inhabits freshwater, brackish, and marine ecosystems from southeastern Europe to central Asia, specifically in the Black Sea, Sea of Azov, Caspian Sea, and Aral Sea basins.

== Taxonomy ==
First described by Karl Fedorovich Kessler in 1859 from specimens taken from Odessa, Ukraine, the Ukrainian stickleback is classified in the family Gasterosteidae (sticklebacks) in the class Actinopterygii. It has been referred to by at least a dozen synonyms.

== Description ==
The Ukrainian stickleback grows to a maximum length of 6.0 to 7.0 centimetres in standard length. It is differentiated from similar species in its range by its count of 8–11 dorsal spines, large lateral scutes, and caudal peduncle lacking a keel.

== Distribution ==
The Ukrainian stickleback is found in wetlands and rivers draining into the Black Sea, Sea of Azov, Caspian Sea, and Aral Sea basins. It also inhabits the Axios and Loudias rivers in Greece and the Nura river of Kazakhstan. Additionally, it colonized the Ishim river in Russia via a manmade canal in the 1980s.

== Ecology ==
The Ukrainian stickleback prefers high-vegetation areas and the littoral zone of wetlands. It feeds on benthic invertebrates such as mosquito larvae and is preyed upon by piscivorous fishes, seals, frogs, birds, snakes, and turtles.

During spawning season, males gain red coloring and build a nest of plant and algae material, courting a female who lays about 90 eggs. The male guards the nest until the young leave a few weeks later.

Though the fish's population may be declining in some parts of its range, such as the Aral Sea, it is classified as a least concern species on the IUCN Red List due to its wide range, few identified population threats, and documented expansion into new watersheds.

In the Volga River basin, the southern nine-spined stickleback (Pungitius platygaster) has experienced local population declines and mass fish kills during abnormally high summer temperatures. This highlights the vulnerability of marginal, newly acquired populations to extreme heat events associated with ongoing climate change.
