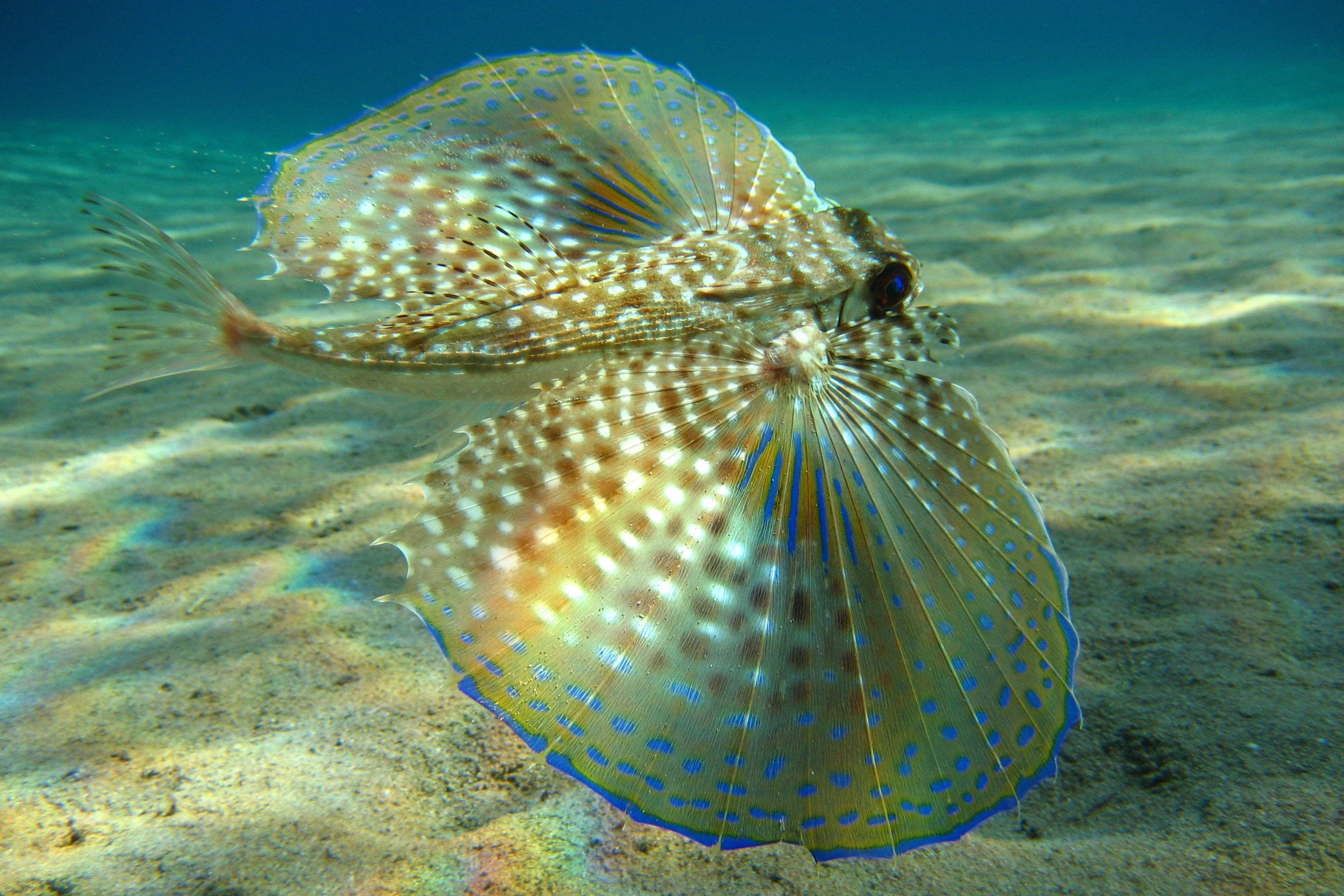
- A flying gurnard near Crete, Greece

Conservation status
- Least Concern (IUCN 3.1)

Scientific classification
- Kingdom: Animalia
- Phylum: Chordata
- Class: Actinopterygii
- Division: Teleostei
- Order: Syngnathiformes
- Family: Dactylopteridae
- Genus: Dactylopterus
- Species: D. volitans

Binomial name
- Dactylopterus volitans (Linnaeus, 1758)

Synonyms
- Callionymus pelagicus Rafinesque, 1818; Cephalacanthus spinarella (Linnaeus, 1758); Cephalacanthus volitans (Linnaeus, 1758); Dactilopterus volitans (Linnaeus, 1758); Dactylopterus blochii Swainson, 1839; Dactylopterus communis Owen, 1853; Dactylopterus fasciatus Swainson, 1839; Dactylopterus occidentalis Swainson, 1839; Dactylopterus spinarella (Linnaeus, 1758); Dactylopterus tentaculatus Swainson, 1839; Dactylopterus vulgaris Steindachner, 1867; Gasterosteus spinarella Linnaeus, 1758; Gonocephalus macrocephalus Gronow, 1854; Polynemus sexradiatus Mitchill, 1818; Trigla fasciata Bloch & Schneider, 1801; Trigla volitans Linnaeus, 1758

= Flying gurnard =

Species of fish

The flying gurnard (Dactylopterus volitans), also known as the helmet gurnard, is a species of Syngnathiformes fish belonging to the family Dactylopteridae. It is a bottom-dwelling fish that inhabits tropical to warm temperate waters on both sides of the Atlantic.

It is the only species in the genus Dactylopterus making it monotypic. Similar and related species from the genus Dactyloptena are found in the Indian and Pacific Oceans.

== Taxonomy ==
The flying gurnard is a Syngnathiform, an order of fish that includes seahorses, seamoths, pipefishes and other groups. It is a member of the family Dactylopteridae along with Dactyloptena. The genus it is in contains only species which makes it a monospecific taxa.

It used to be classed within the order Scorpaeniformes but was moved to its current classification based on molecular evidence.

== Habitat ==
It is native to the Atlantic Ocean being found on both sides. On the American side, it is found as far north as Massachusetts (exceptionally as far as Canada) and as far south as Argentina, including the Caribbean Sea and Gulf of Mexico. On the European and African side, it ranges from the English Channel to Angola, including the Mediterranean Sea.

== Description ==
It reaches up to 50 cm (20 in) in length and 1.8 kg (4.0 lb) in weight.

This fish is variable in coloration, being brownish or greenish with reddish or yellowish patches. The fish also has large eyes.

=== Pectoral fins ===
Each pectoral fin can be separated into two distinct sections. The anterior side (the digging side) mainly consist of segmented and flexible fin rays but has an anterior robust unsegmented ray providing an edge. This edge allows them to dig into the substrate in search for prey. The posterior side is also supported by unsegmented rays.

When excited, the fish spreads its pectoral fins to make "wings". They are semitransparent, with a phosphorescent, bright-blue coloration at their tips.

== Behavior ==
The fish's main diet consists of small fish, bivalves, and crustaceans. They will use their pectoral fins to dig into the sediment to access prey items living within the sediments. Then they capture it by using oral suction feeding. When digging, they will typically use only one of their pectoral fins for digging. Each cycle of digging consist of 1-7 cycles of movement which occurs at a frequency of 1.15–3.74 cycles per second. To dig, it will move its fins forwards and then medially above the substrate. It will then twisted it medially and simultaneously depressed so that the anterior ray impacts and enters the substrate. It is then drawn backwards and laterally to disturb the substrate.

The species has the ability to adapt its coloration to its surroundings, ranging from very dark brownish or greyish to very light tones, approaching white, depending on the substrate and environmental conditions.

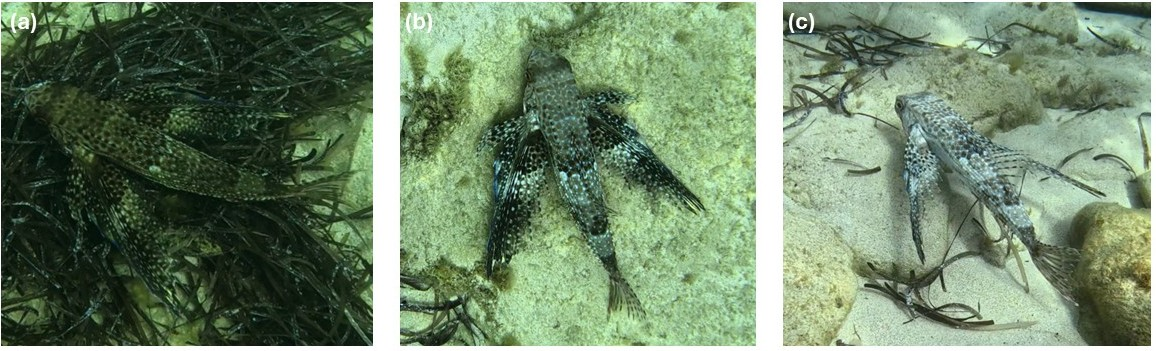
Example of colour variation in the flying gurnard (Dactylopterus volitans). Pictures show the same individual against three different backgrounds: (a) dark coloration while moving over remains of dead Posidonia oceanica, (b) a slightly lighter tone, and (c) an almost white coloration to blend in with a sandy substrate.

=== Acoustics ===
The acoustic repertoire of Dactylopterus volitans consist of two distinct sounds, grunt A and grunt B, that are produced in an alternating pattern. Grunt A is a 225 Hertz harmonic sound that is composed of two to nine pulses that lasted around 30 milliseconds. These are either produced in isolation or in bursts with distinct short and long intervals. Grunt B is a about 170 Hertz composed of two to four pulses that lasts around 110 milliseconds.

== Gallery ==
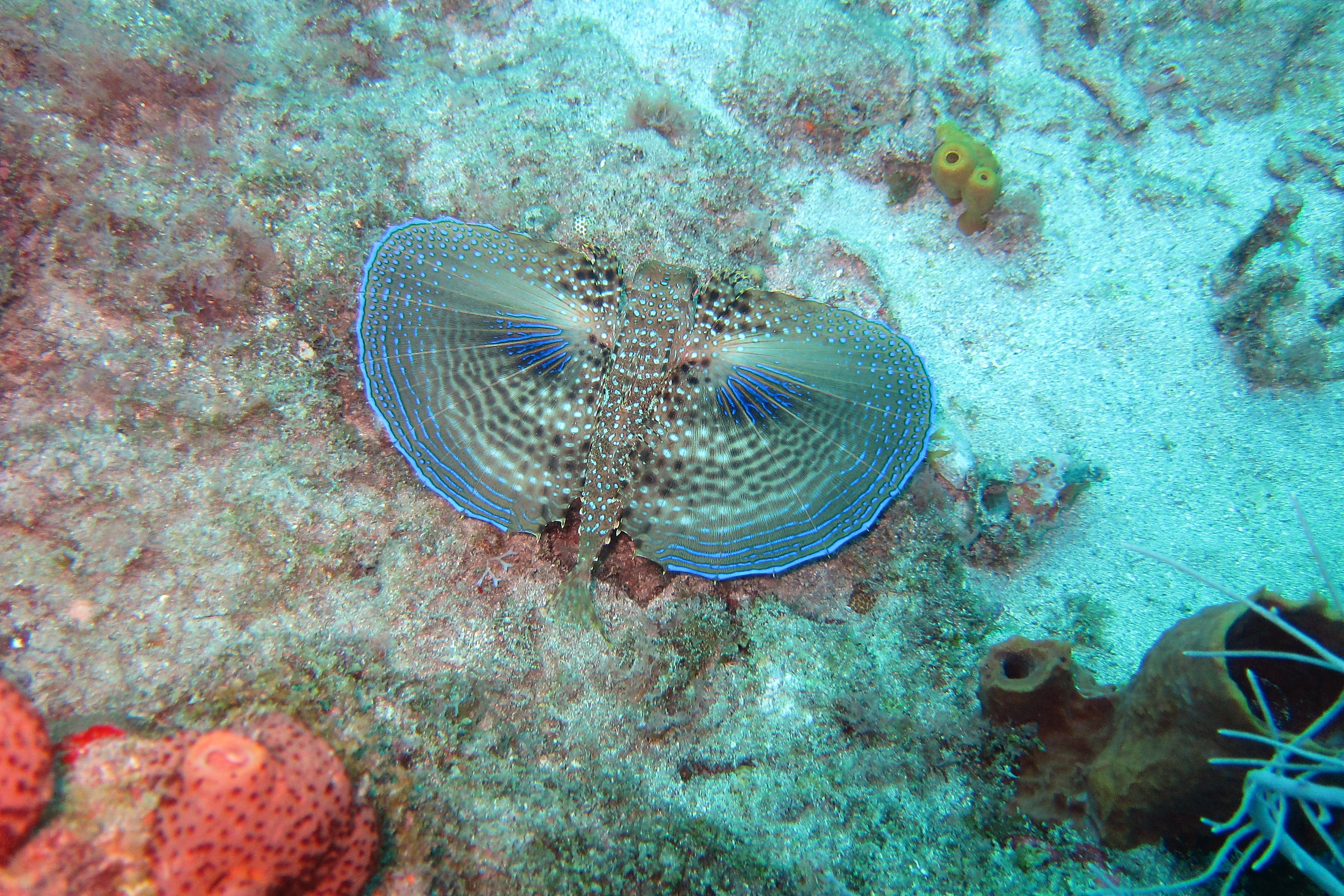
In the Caribbean

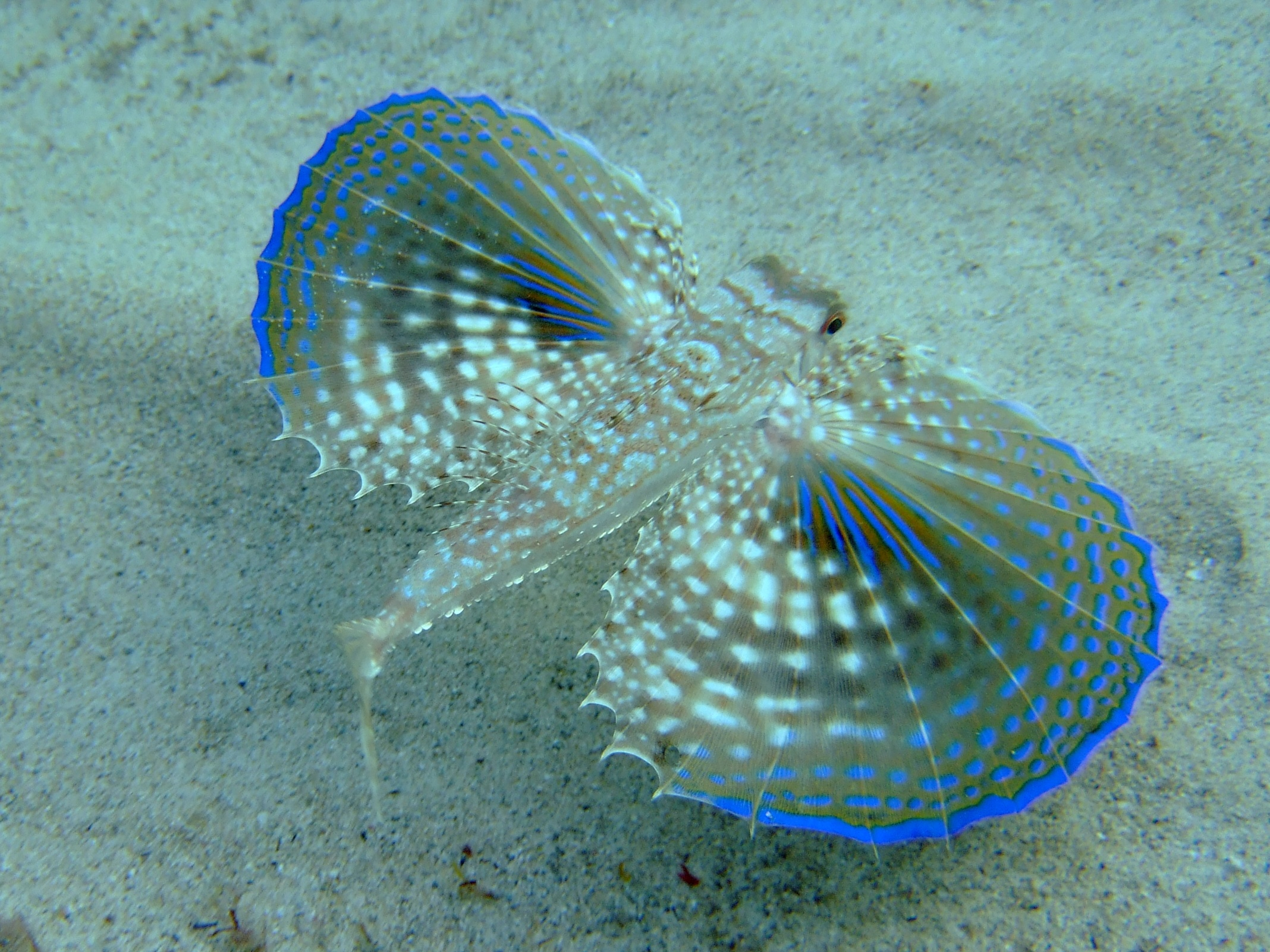

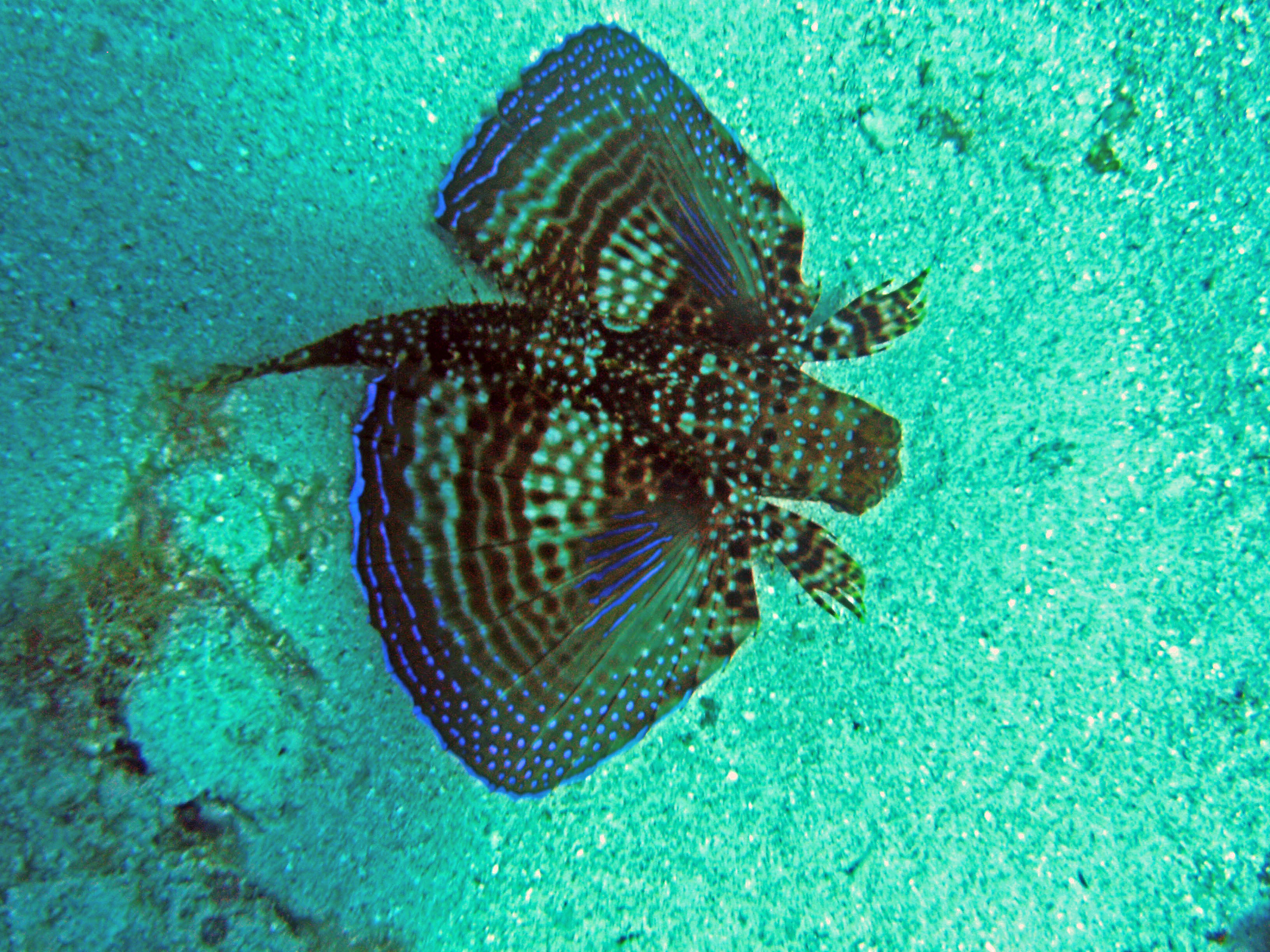
Jamaica

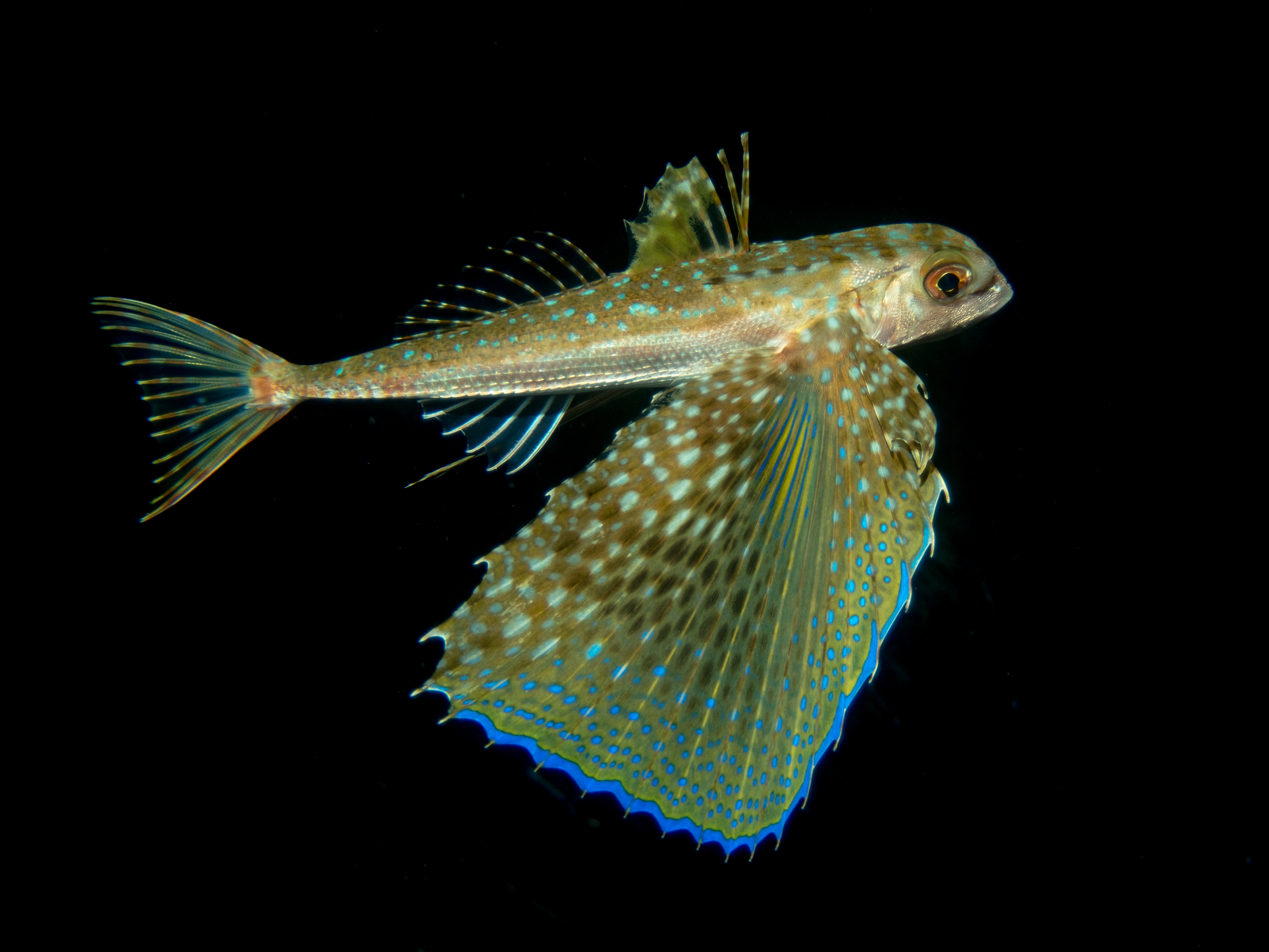
In Malta

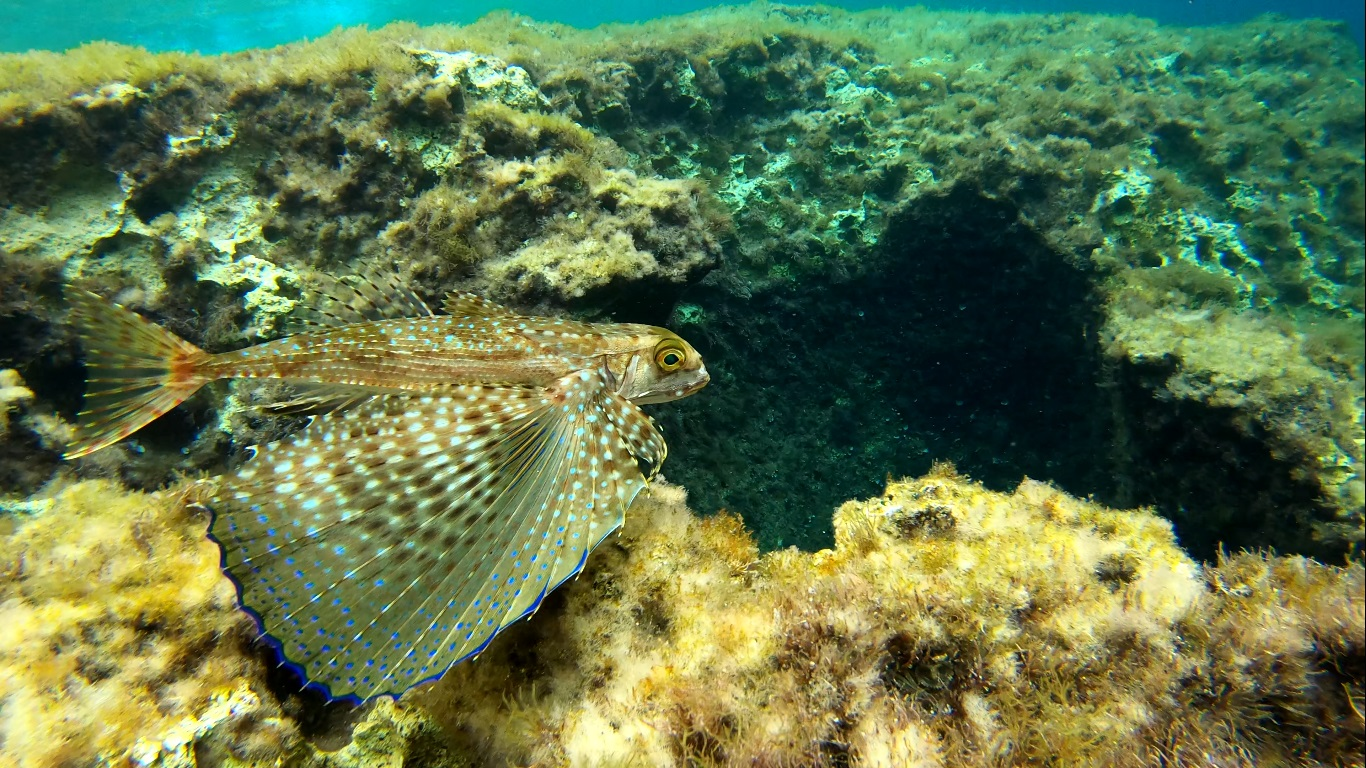
In Malta

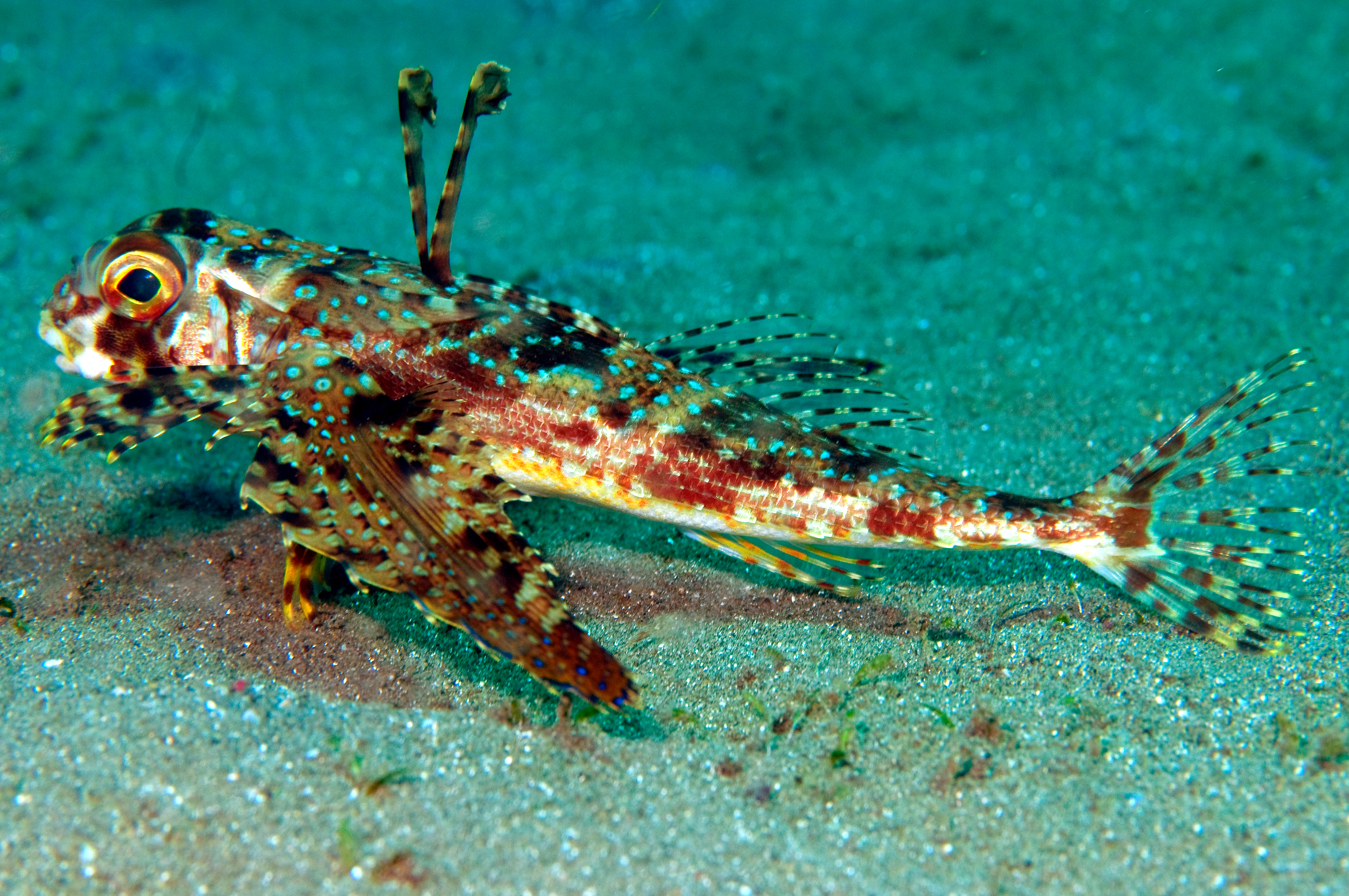
At St. Vincent
