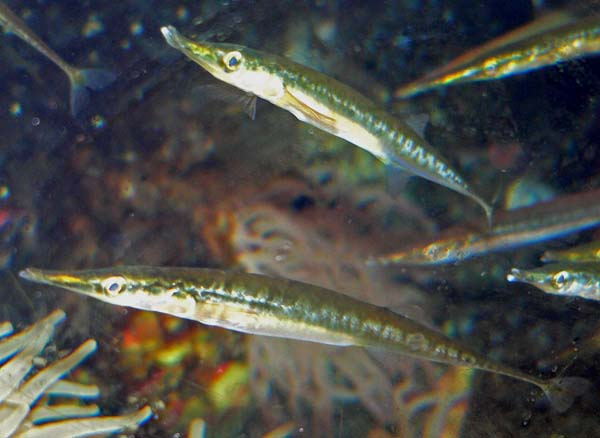
- Tube-snout (Aulorhynchus flavidus)

Scientific classification
- Kingdom: Animalia
- Phylum: Chordata
- Class: Actinopterygii
- Order: Perciformes
- Suborder: Gasterosteoidei
- Family: Aulorhynchidae; Gill, 1861

Genera
- see text

= Aulorhynchidae =

Family of ray-finned fishes

Aulorhynchidae, the tube-snouts, is a small family of marine ray-finned fishes belonging to the suborder Gasterosteoidei in the order Perciformes. These fishes are found in the northern Pacific Ocean.

== Taxonomy ==
Aulorhynchidae was first proposed as a family in 1861 by the American zoologist Theodore Gill, when he described Aulorhynchus flavidus, placing it in a new monotypic family. This family is included in the suborder Gasterosteoidei of the order Scorpaeniformes in the 5th edition of Fishes of the World. Other authorities treat the Gasterosteoidei as the infraorder Gasterosteales within the suborder Cottoidei or as a sister clade to the Zoarcales in the order Zoarciformes. Some authorities include the genus Aulichthys in the Hypoptychidae, but the 5th edition of Fishes of the World puts this taxon in the family Aulorhynchidae.

== Etymology ==
Aulorhynchidae is derived from its type genus, Aulorhynchus, the name of which is a combination of aulos, meaning "flute", and rhynchus, which means "snout", a reference to the flexible tubular snout of the tube-snout.

== Genera and species ==
Aulorhynchidae includes two monospecific genera, i.e. the family comprises 2 species:

- Aulichthys Brevoort 1862
  - Aulichthys japonicus Brevoort, 1862 (Tubenose)
- Aulorhynchus Gill, 1861
  - Aulorhynchus flavidus Gill, 1861 (Tube-snout)

== Characteristics ==
Aulorhyncidae tubesnouts are characterised by looking like elongated sticklebacks as they have long, slender bodies and have a series of 15 small spines to the front of the dorsal fin. Like related taxa these fishes produce an adhesive substance in their kidneys which they use to create egg masses which are then attached to kelp in Aulorhynchus and inside ascidians in Aulichthys.

== Distribution ==
Aulorhyncidae tubesnouts are found in the northern Pacific Ocean, Aulorhynchus from Alaska to California and Aulichthys from the north western Pacific Ocean.
