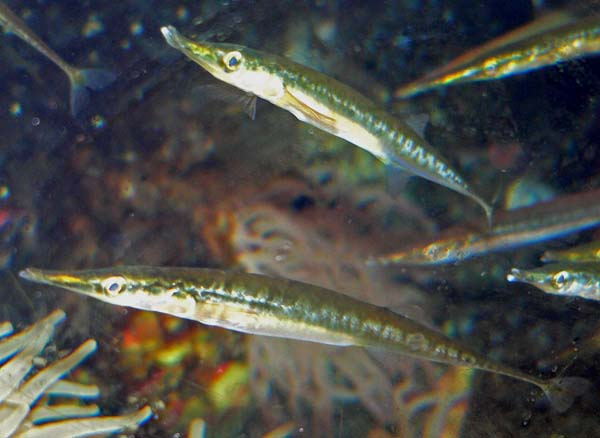

Conservation status
- Least Concern (IUCN 3.1)

Scientific classification
- Kingdom: Animalia
- Phylum: Chordata
- Class: Actinopterygii
- Order: Perciformes
- Suborder: Gasterosteoidei
- Family: Aulorhynchidae
- Genus: Aulorhynchus; T. N. Gill, 1861
- Species: A. flavidus

Binomial name
- Aulorhynchus flavidus T. N. Gill, 1861

= Aulorhynchus =

Genus of fishes

Aulorhynchus is a monospecific genus of marine ray-finned fish belonging to the family Aulorhynchidae. Its only species is the tube-snout (Aulorhynchus flavidus) which is found off the western coast of North America.

== Taxonomy ==
Aulorhynchus was first proposed as a genus in 1861 by the American zoologist Theodore Gill, when he described Aulorhynchus flavidus, placing it in a new monotypic genus. The type locality is given as the coast of Washington. This genus is included in the family Aulorhynchidae in the suborder Gasterosteoidei of the order Scorpaeniformes in the 5th edition of Fishes of the World.

== Etymology ==
Aulorhynchus, the genus name, is a combination of aulos, meaning "flute", and rhynchus, which means "snout", a reference to the flexible tubular snout of this species The specific name, flavidus means "yellowish".

== Description ==
This species grows to 18 cm (7.1 in) in total length. It physically resembles the sticklebacks, but has a thinner, longer body, with 24 to 27 small spines in front of the dorsal fin.

== Biology ==
Aulorhynchus also possess a slender snout, hence the common name. Like the sticklebacks, it feeds on small invertebrates and fish larvae.

Also, like sticklebacks, it produces a sticky secretion from its kidneys when breeding. Whereas sticklebacks use this secretion to bind plant matter together to create a nest, the tube-snout simply attaches its eggs to a substrate. Aulorhynchus attaches its eggs to kelp, notably Macrocystis pyrifera.

Spawning occurs throughout the year, and males guard nest sites by actively defending them from predators. The nests are found at depths of 10–20 m and have been recorded up to 38 m.

The tubesnout feeds on small planktonic crustaceans, including amphipods, mysids, and crab larvae.

This species finds use as a denizen in public aquariums.

== Habitat ==
The tubesnout is found in shallow marine waters off the Pacific coast of North America to a depth of 30 m (98 ft), from Prince William Sound in Alaska to Rompiente, Baja California. The species inhabits rocky crevices, kelp beds, eelgrass, and areas with a sandy bottom substrate.
