= Aulichthys =

Aulichthys Temporal range: Middle Miocene to present

Conservation status
- Least Concern (IUCN 3.1)

Scientific classification
- Kingdom: Animalia
- Phylum: Chordata
- Class: Actinopterygii
- Order: Perciformes
- Suborder: Gasterosteoidei
- Family: Aulorhynchidae
- Genus: Aulichthys; Brevoort, 1862
- Species: A. japonicus

Binomial name
- Aulichthys japonicus Brevoort, 1862

Genus of fishes

Aulichthys is a monospecific genus of marine ray-finned fish belonging to the family Hypoptychidae. Its only species is Aulichthys japonicus, the tubenose, which is found in the shallow waters on the coasts of Japan, China and the Korean Peninsula. This species lays its eggs inside of the peribranchial cavities of ascidians. This species grows to a length of 12.8 centimetres (5.0 in) SL.

A fossil relative, †Aulichthys miocaenicus Nazarkin, 2019 is known from the Middle Miocene of Sakhalin, Russia.
