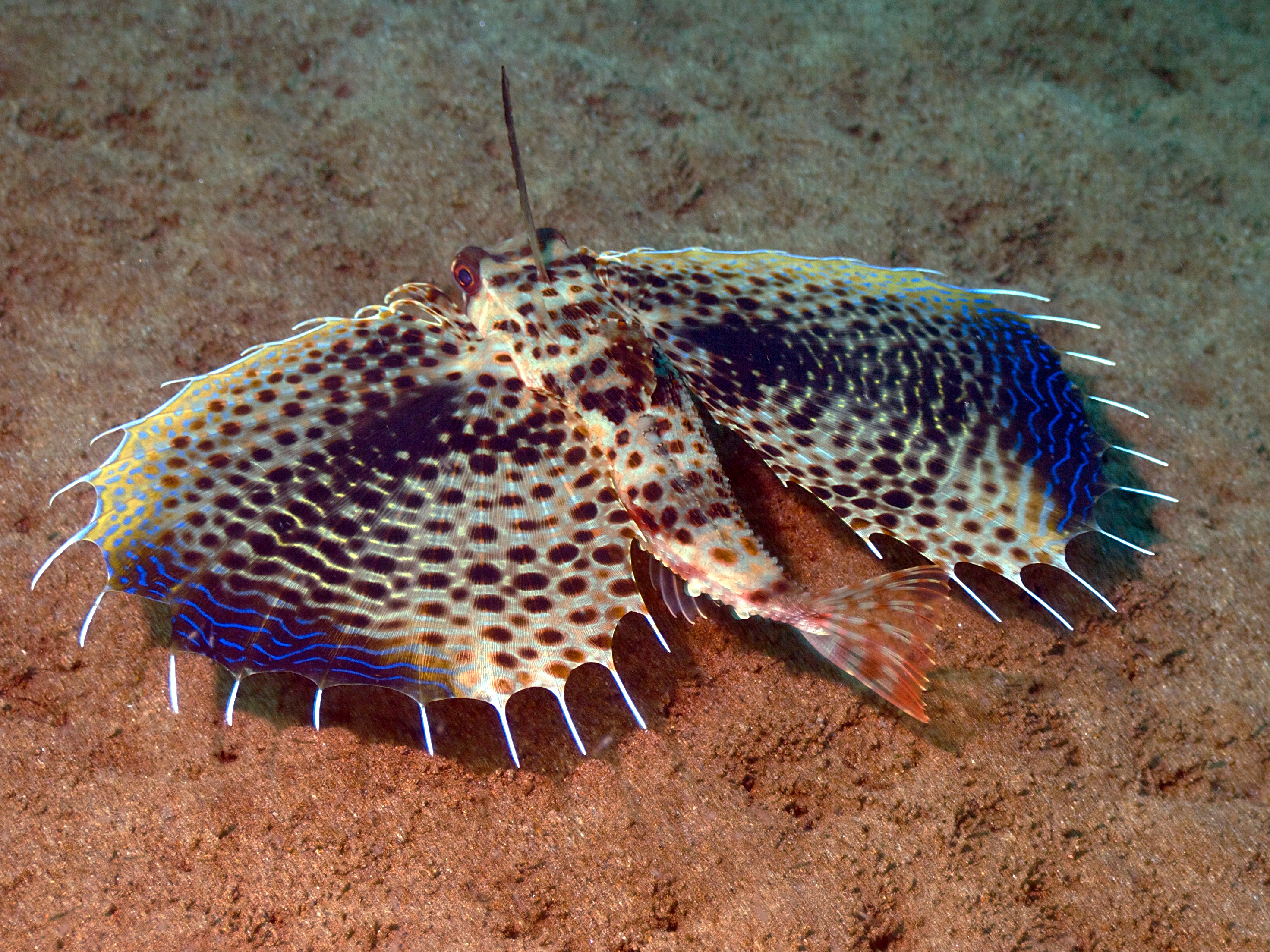

Conservation status
- Least Concern (IUCN 3.1)

Scientific classification
- Kingdom: Animalia
- Phylum: Chordata
- Class: Actinopterygii
- Division: Teleostei
- Order: Syngnathiformes
- Family: Dactylopteridae
- Genus: Dactyloptena
- Species: D. orientalis

Binomial name
- Dactyloptena orientalis (G. Cuvier, 1829)

Synonyms
- Corystion orientale (Cuvier, 1829); Corystion orientalis (Cuvier, 1829); Dactylopterus cheirophthalmus (Bleeker, 1855); Dactylopterus japonicus (Bleeker, 1854); Dactylopterus orientalis (Cuvier, 1829); Ebisinus procne (Ogilby, 1910)

= Oriental flying gurnard =

Species of fish

Dactyloptena orientalis, known commonly as the Oriental flying gurnard or purple flying gurnard among other vernacular names, is a species of marine fish in the family Dactylopteridae. Their name is derived from the French word 'gurnard' meaning to grunt, for the grunting sound this fish makes.

== Description ==
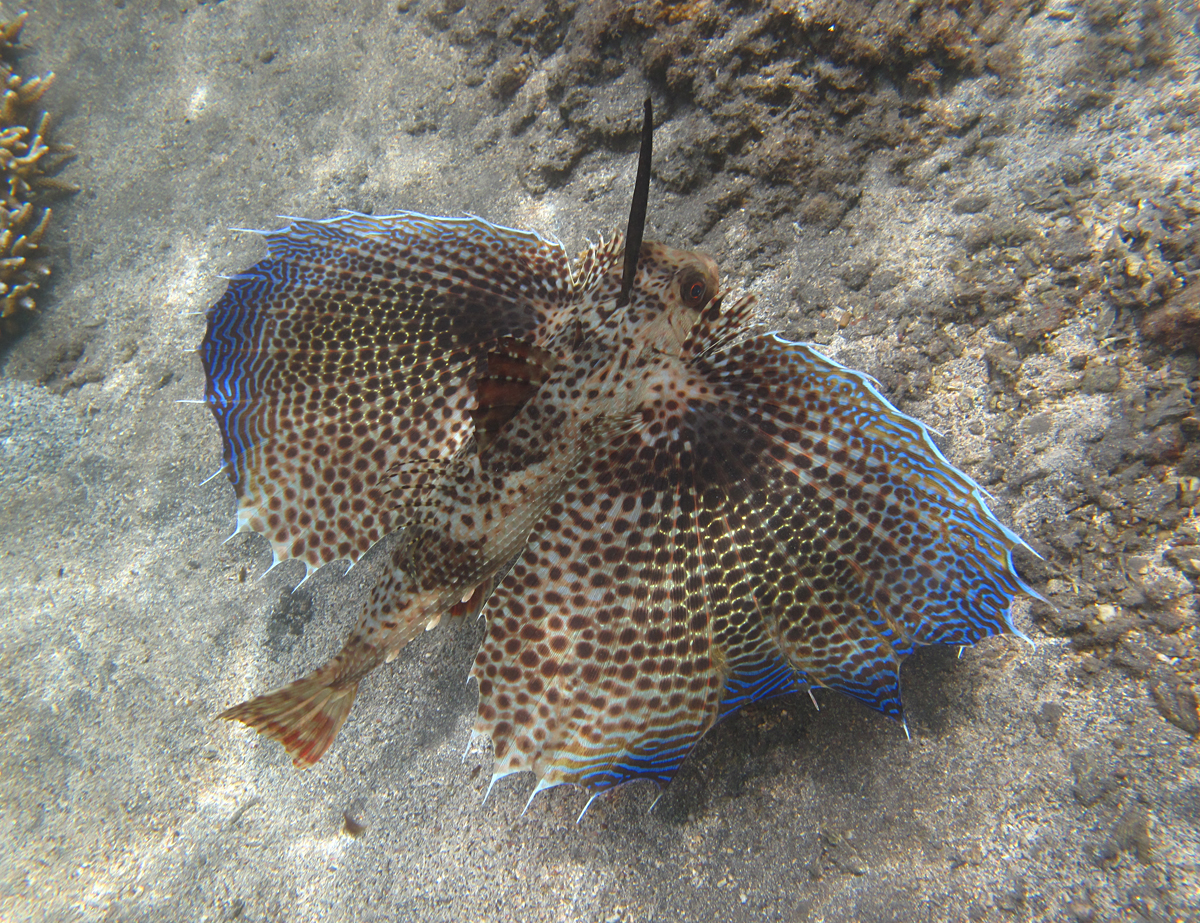
At Réunion island

The oriental flying gurnard can grow to 40 cm (16 in) in length but its common size is about 20 cm (8 in). It has a broad head with a blunt snout and the eyes are set a long way apart. It has a heavily armoured robust body. The dorsal fin has seven spines and nine soft rays while the anal fin has no spines and six to seven soft rays. The huge, rounded pectoral fins having many dark spots and wavy streaks and a bright blue edge. Each ray has a feeler-like extension on the tip. This fish is well camouflaged with a grayish brown base color with dark brown or black markings on its head and body.

== Distribution and habitat ==
At Morotai, Indonesia

The Oriental flying gurnard is widespread throughout the tropical waters of the Indo-Pacific region including the Red Sea. Its range extends from the coasts of East Africa to Polynesia and the western, northern and eastern coasts of Australia. It is found on the seabed in bays and estuaries and sandy areas, most often at depths of about 10 m (33 ft) but sometimes as deep as 100 m (328 ft).

== Behavior ==
The pectoral fins are normally held against the body, but when threatened the fins are expanded to startle potential predators which may include sea breams and mackerel. The flying gurnard uses its pelvic fins to walk along the bottom of the ocean.

The oriental flying gurnard feeds on small bony fish, bivalves, and crustaceans.

== Gallery ==
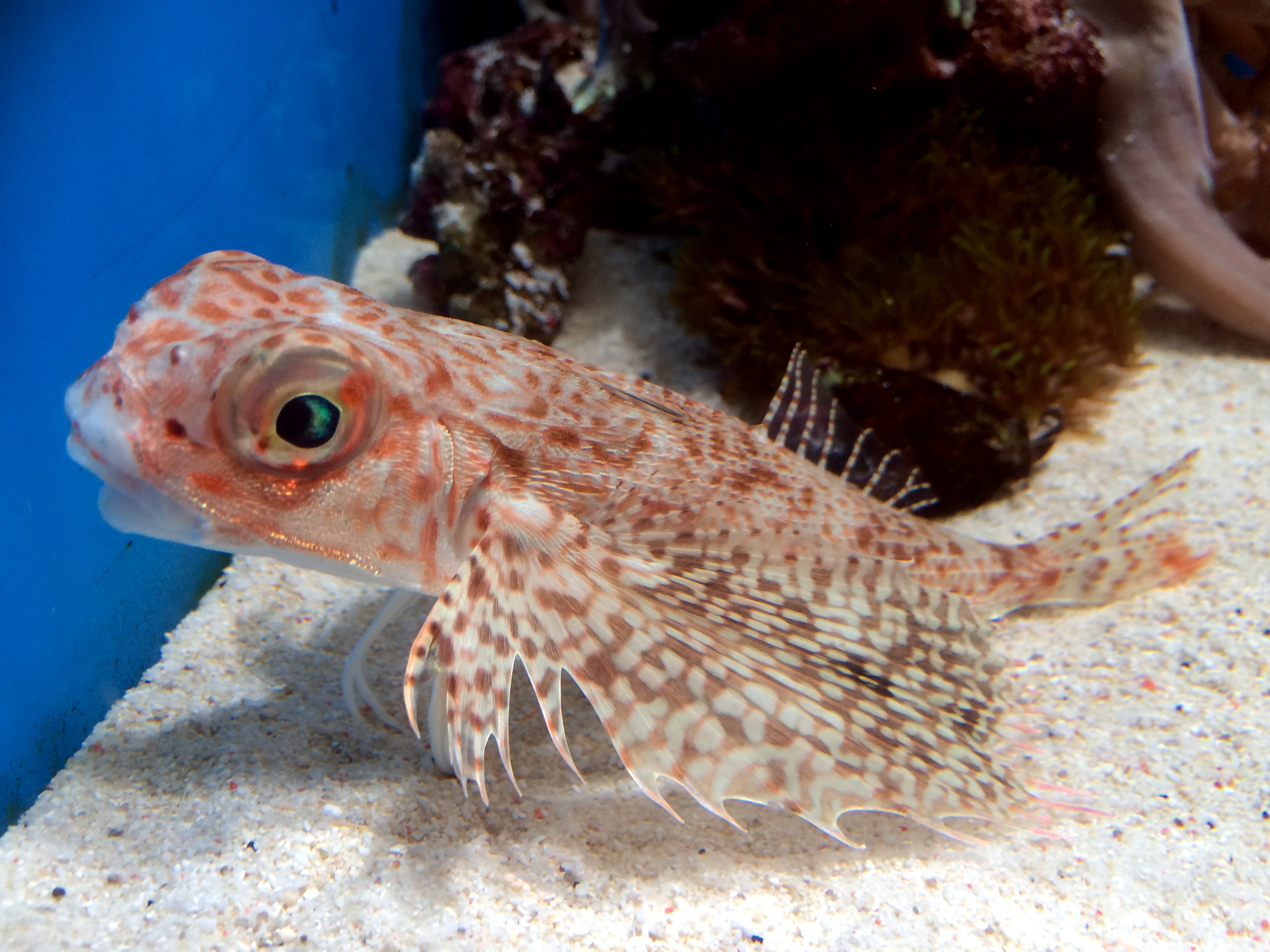
At Numazu Deep Sea Aquarium in Japan

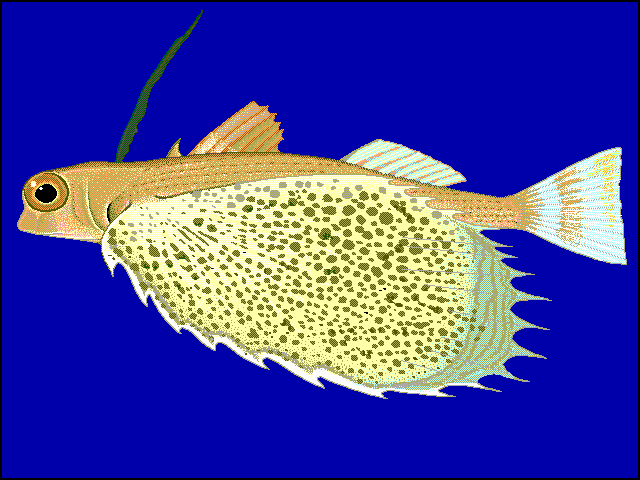
Digital side-view with expanded pectoral fin

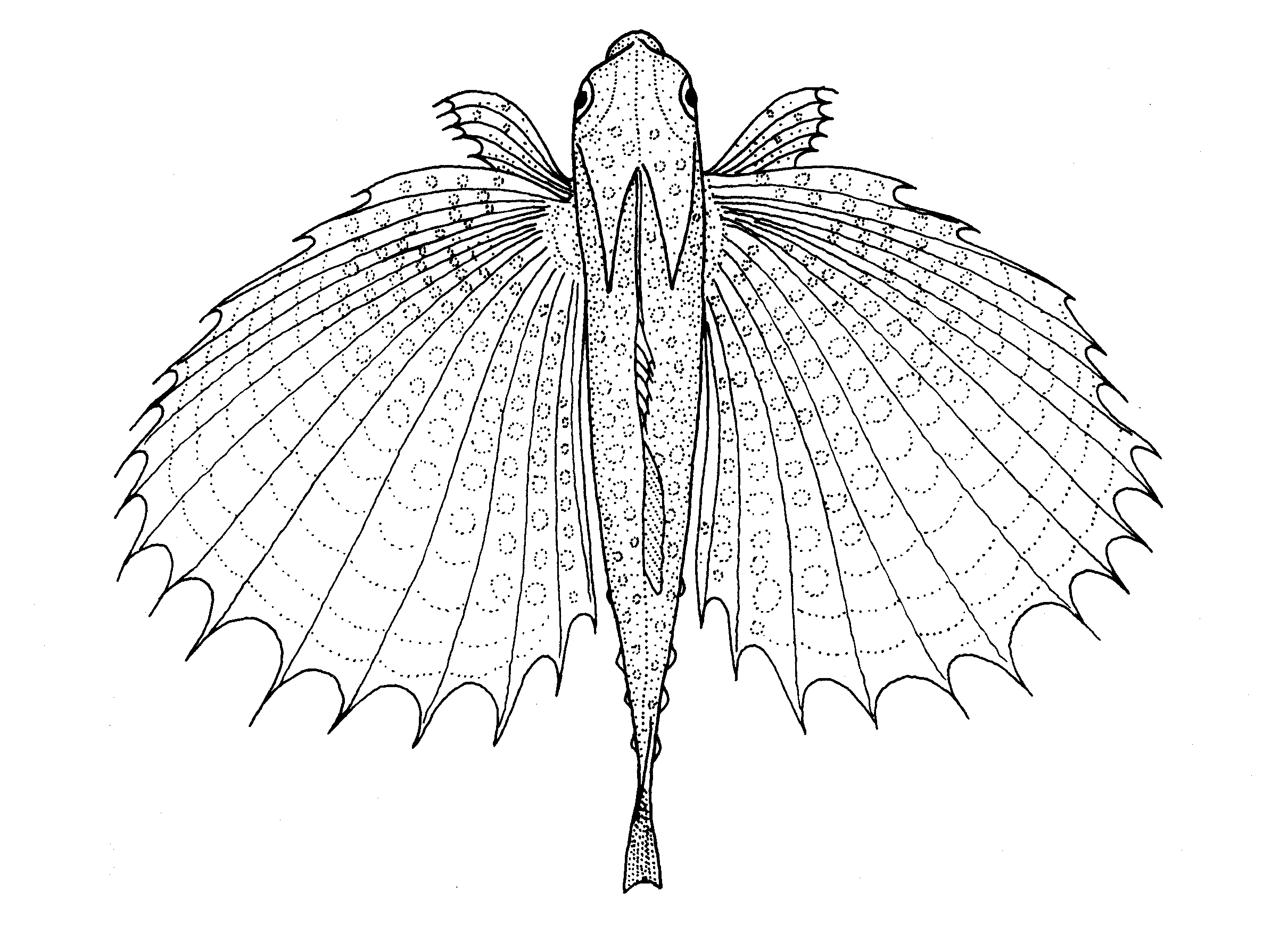
Top view drawing

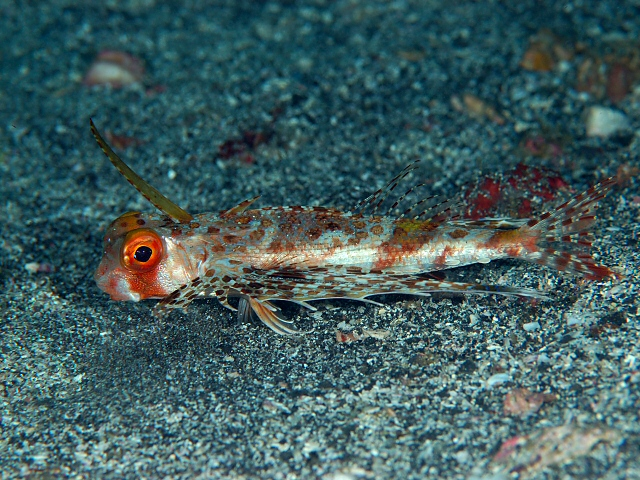
Side view showing "walking" with pectoral fins against body

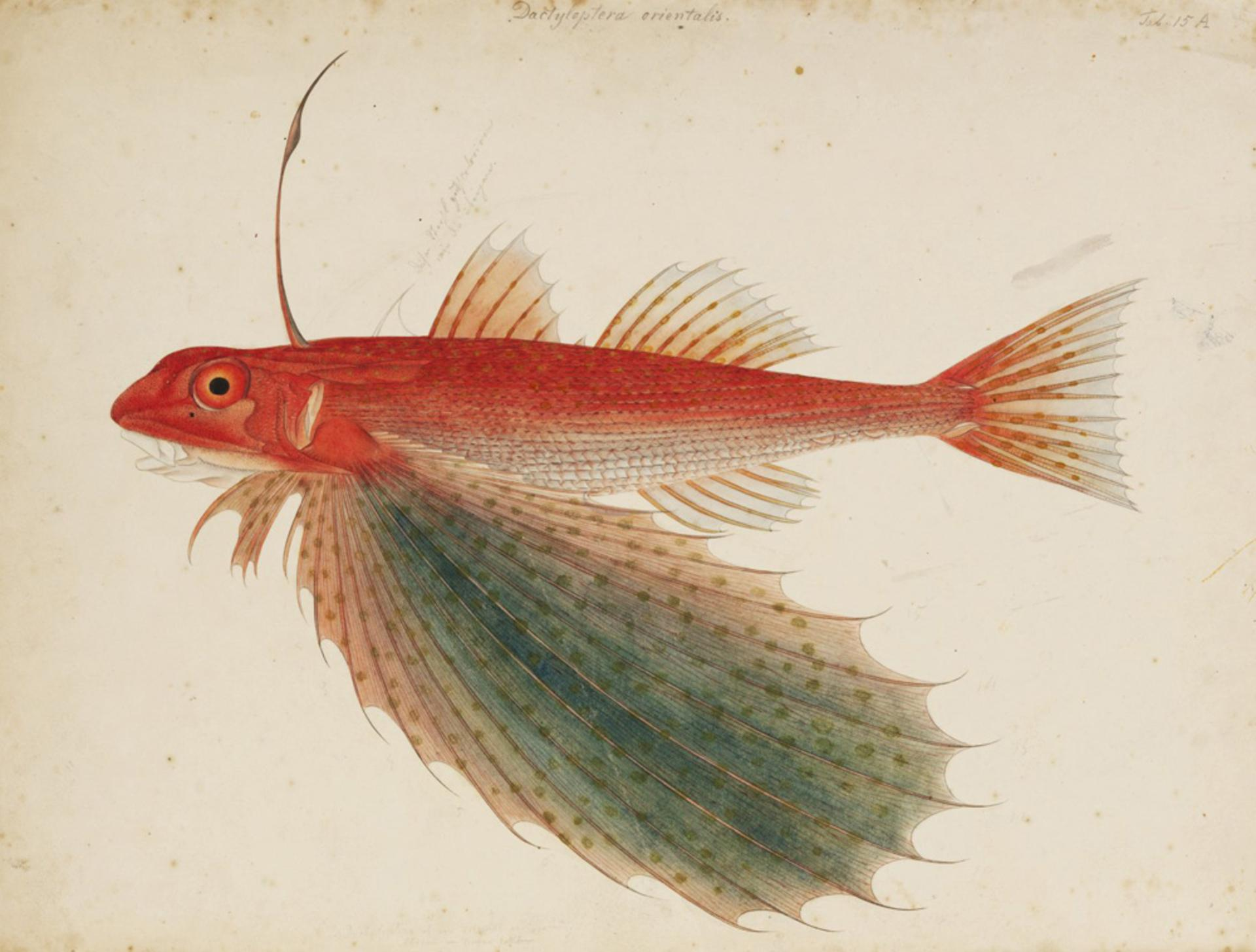
Drawing by Kawahara Keiga, 1823-1829
