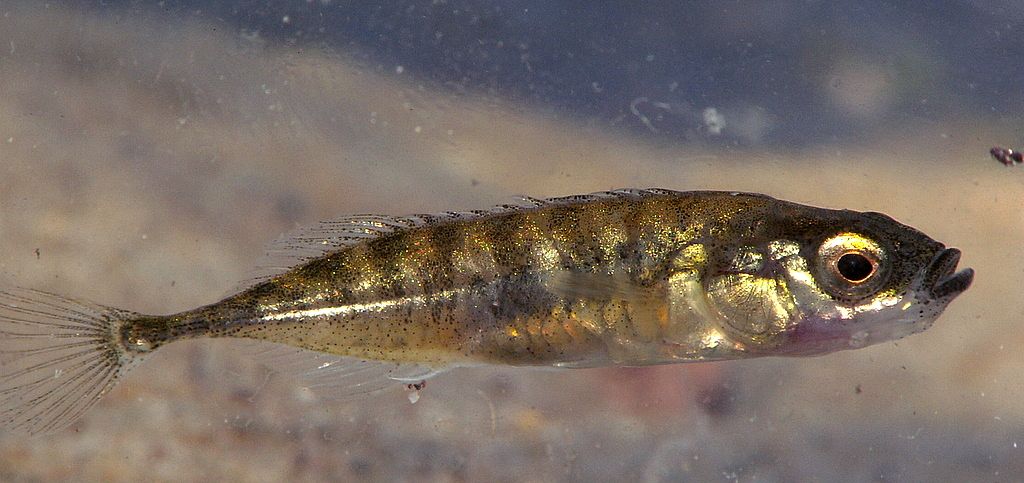

Conservation status
- Least Concern (IUCN 3.1)

Scientific classification
- Kingdom: Animalia
- Phylum: Chordata
- Class: Actinopterygii
- Division: Teleostei
- Order: Perciformes
- Family: Gasterosteidae
- Genus: Pungitius
- Species: P. pungitius

Binomial name
- Pungitius pungitius (Linnaeus, 1758)

Synonyms
- Gasterosteus pungitius Linnaeus, 1758; Gasteracanthus pungitius (Linnaeus, 1758); Pungitius pungitius pungitius (Linnaeus, 1758); Pygosteus pungitius (Linnaeus, 1758); Gasterosteus occidentalis Cuvier, 1829; Gasterosteus concinnus Richardson, 1836; Gasterosteus mainensis Storer, 1837; Gasterosteus dekayi Agassiz, 1850; Gasterosteus nebulosus Agassiz, 1850; Gasterosteus globiceps Sauvage, 1874; Gasterosteus blanchardi Sauvage, 1874; Gasterosteus pungitius brachypoda Bean, 1879; Pygosteus pungitius brachypoda (Bean, 1879); Pygosteus pungitius trachura Bertin, 1925; Pygosteus pungitius semiarmata Bertin, 1925; Pygosteus pungitius carinata Bertin, 1925

= Ninespine stickleback =

Species of fish

The ninespine stickleback (Pungitius pungitius), also called the ten-spined stickleback, is a freshwater species of fish in the family Gasterosteidae that inhabits temperate waters. It is widely but locally distributed throughout Eurasia and North America. Despite its name, the number of spines can vary from 8 to 12.

== Description ==
The ninespine stickleback is a small fish, reaching a maximum size of around 12.5 cm. It reaches an age of about 3 years. The body of the ninespine stickleback tapers to a very narrow caudal peduncle and the caudal fin is fan-shaped. The body is less deep and more elongated than that of the three-spined stickleback with a thinner and longer caudal peduncle, but the best way of distinguishing these two species is the number of spines in front of the dorsal fin which, for this species, varies from seven to twelve although nine is the commonest number. This species does not have scales but there is a group of small bony plates on the narrowest part of the caudal peduncle at the lateral line. The mouth points upwards in this species. It is generally greyish or olive-brown with silvery flanks irregularly barred or blotched with darker colour. During the breeding season, the males develop a black area around the pelvis and the pelvic spines become white. The eyes are dark with a gold ring around the pupils.

The ninespine stickleback lives in streams, lakes, ponds and rivers and favors thick submerged vegetation, as its small spines do not offer much protection. Like the three spined stickleback, they have a series of scutes or bony plates along the lateral line but, in freshwater populations, these are frequently reduced in number with a gap between the anterior and posterior plates.

== Distribution ==
The species occurs in freshwater systems draining into the Arctic Ocean and the Atlantic across Canada, Alaska, and south to New Jersey. It is present on the North American Pacific coast of Alaska and in the Great Lakes basin. It can also be found throughout most of Eurasia, including the United Kingdom, Greenland, Turkey and the Far East.

== Behaviour ==
During the breeding season (April to July), the male builds a nest suspended on a piece of waterweed, about an inch or so above the substrate at the bottom. The female is attracted by the male and she lays eggs inside the nest, but then departs, leaving parental care to the male. The male guards these eggs and the young fry when they hatch. Then, when they have their spines, he drives them away to look after themselves.

== Physiology ==
The ninespine stickleback is a euryhaline and eurythermal species of teleost fish, occupying both freshwater and marine habitats in higher latitudes of the world. Recently, this species has been under great examination due to pond populations' adaptations of morphology, life history, and behavior which separates them from their marine conspecifics. Many recently isolated populations (<11,000 years) have been studied to identify ranges of phenotypic plasticity and possible genetic drift between populations. It has been found that marine populations exhibit metabolic rate reduction when in colder conditions, in addition to having an elevated hepatosomatic index (HSI) at all temperature conditions as compared to freshwater populations in those same conditions. Hepatosomatic index refers to the proportional size of the liver of the fish to its body mass, as in indication of energy reserves. In addition, certain freshwater pond populations have shown to be able to metabolically compensate to survive a wide range of temperatures, six degrees Celsius to nineteen degrees Celsius. Alterations to metabolic rate, such as decrease in standard metabolic rate, allowed pond population individuals to survive less than favorable conditions. Such physiological differences between populations has not been determined to be exclusively due to plasticity or generic changes; however, there has been found to be significant genetic diversity between marine and freshwater populations.

Due to their climatic versatility, Ninespine Stickleback face much variation in dissolved oxygen in their environment. Ninespines are physoclists, so they lack a connection between their swim bladder and their digestive tract. This means they cannot gulp air from the surface of the water, as physostome fish do, in order to compensate for an environment of low dissolved oxygen, hypoxia. Responses to hypoxia may include increased ventilation rate or slower gill perfusion. Ninespines must rely solely on their gas secretion and absorption abilities, using aquatic surface respiration (ASR) when facing a hypoxic situation. Comparable physostomous fish could prevent ASR to an extent by gulping air, while Ninespines may only rely on only ASR when acclimating to hypoxic conditions. ASR is when the fish rise almost to the surface to ventilate with the top millimeter of water which is high in dissolved oxygen. Ninespine Stickleback do not regularly experience nocturnal hypoxia in their natural environments, and therefore, have slower and decreased control of their swim-bladder lift. Consequently, the Ninespines begin ASR at a much higher dissolved oxygen concentration in hypoxic environments, as compared to other stickleback species, such as the Brook Stickleback.

== In culture ==
The celebrated British zoologist Desmond Morris (born 1928) published a paper in 1952 — "Homosexuality in the ten-spined stickleback (Pygosteus pungitius L.)." — which became the basis of his 1954 doctoral thesis at Oxford University. (This work was undertaken under the tutelage of the famous ethologist Niko Tinbergen.) Morris described and illustrated the normal reproductive behavior of the stickleback as well as certain "pseudofemale" variants which he thought might be fairly frequent in occurrence. ("These observations reveal that the nervous mechanisms of the sexual behavior pattern of the other sex are present, although they are not normally functional.") Although these findings were considered fairly conventional at the time within his specialty, the topic represented a harbinger of the later controversy that Morris's popular publications would arouse when he extended the findings of the biological sciences to the interpretation of aspects of human behavior. He describes some of his adventures with the fish, and his roomful of aquaria, in his book Animal Days (1979).
