= Monument to the siege stickleback =

Monument in Kronstadt, Russia

Coordinates: 59°59′22″N 29°45′43″E

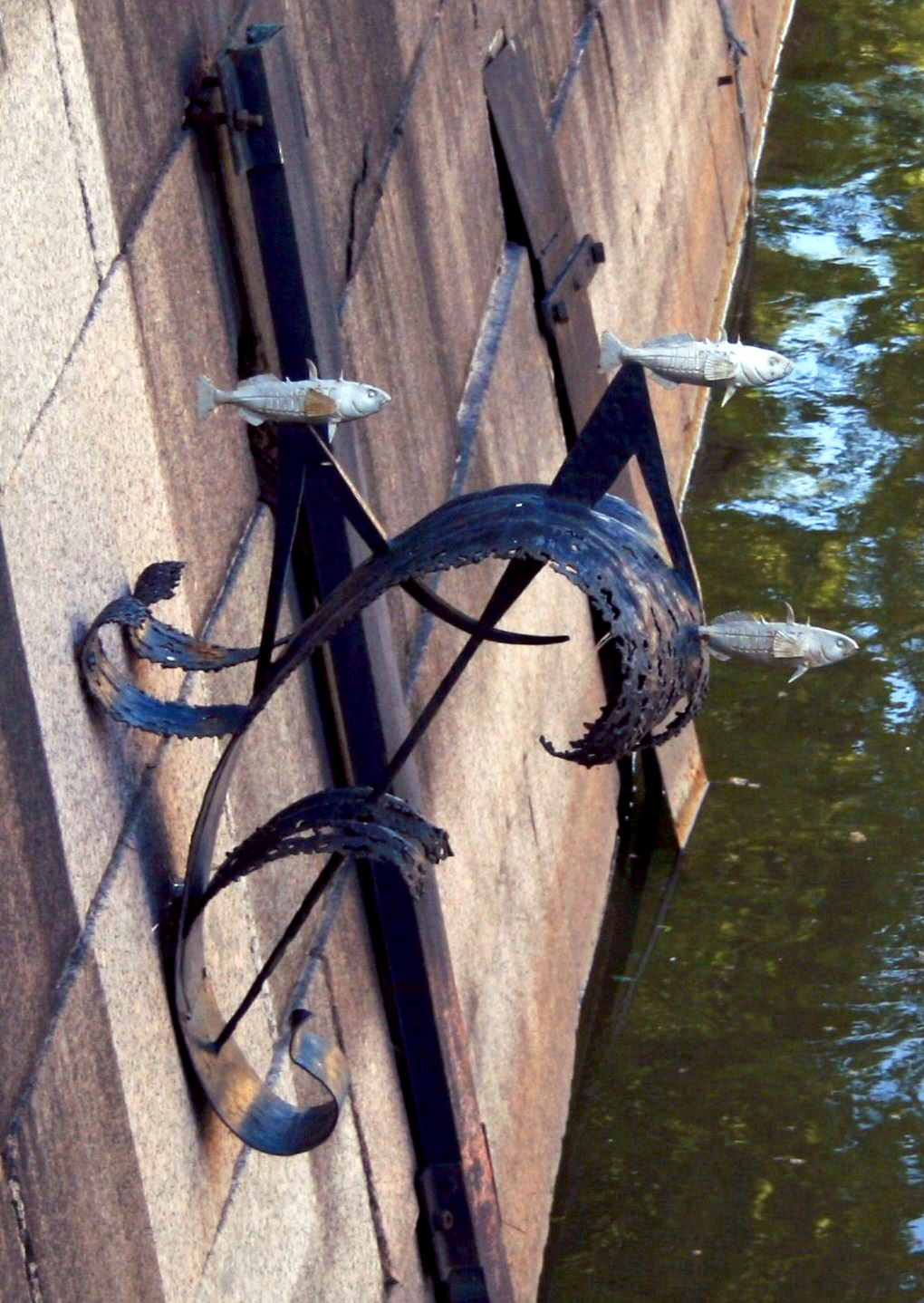
Monument to stickleback

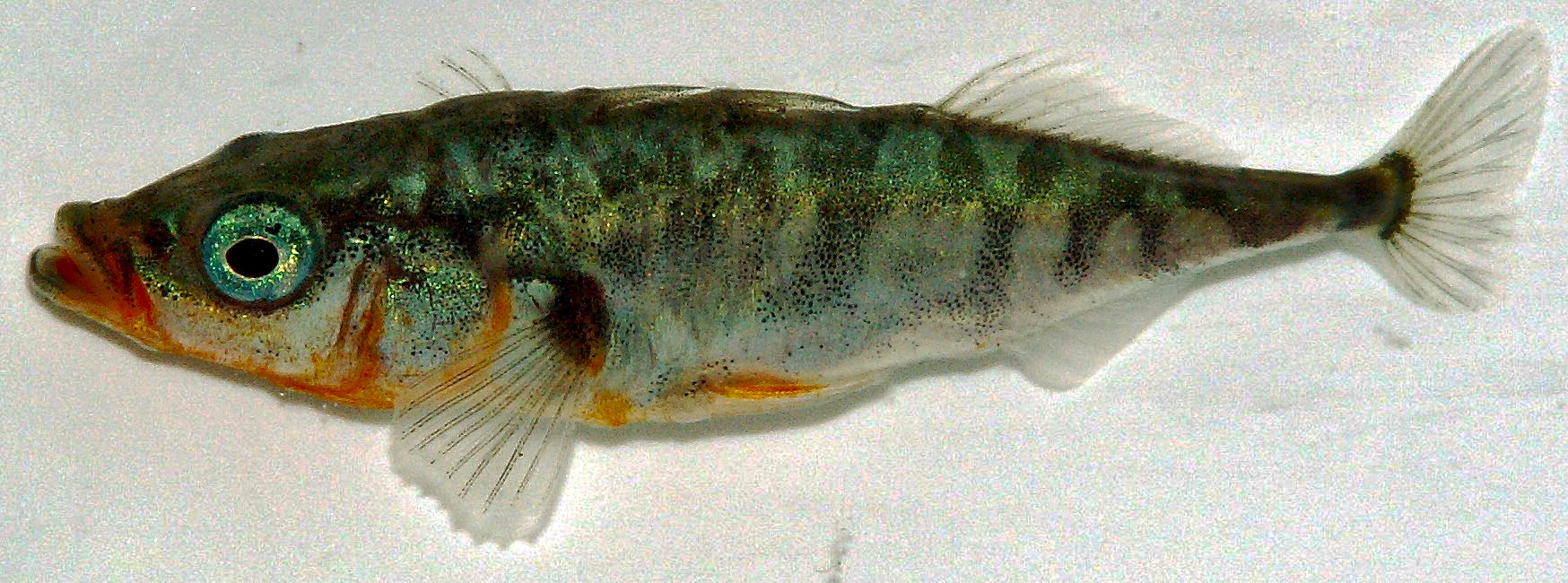
stickleback

The monument to the siege stickleback is a small memorial on the Kotlin Island by Kronstadt, a port city by St. Petersburg, Russia, to commemorate the role of stickleback in saving the city dwellers from famine death during the World War II Siege of Leningrad. It is located on a wall of a canal across the pavilion of the Kronstadt tide gauge.
