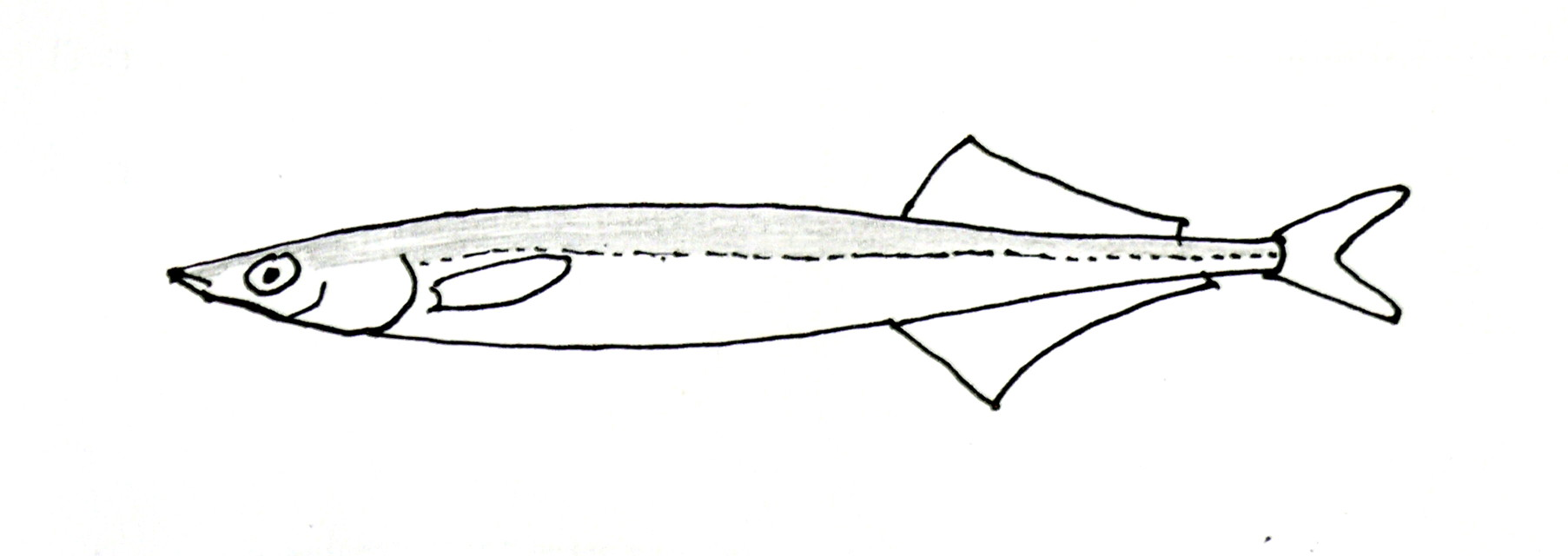

Conservation status
- Data Deficient (IUCN 3.1)

Scientific classification
- Kingdom: Animalia
- Phylum: Chordata
- Class: Actinopterygii
- Order: Perciformes
- Suborder: Gasterosteoidei
- Family: Hypoptychidae; Steindachner, 1880
- Genus: Hypoptychus; Steindachner, 1880
- Species: H. dybowskii

Binomial name
- Hypoptychus dybowskii Steindachner, 1880

= Korean sandlance =

Species of fish

The Korean sandlance (Hypoptychus dybowskii) is a species of marine ray-finned fish belonging to the family Hypoptychidae. The Korean sandlance is the only species in this monotypic family and genus and is found in the northwestern Pacific Ocean.

== Taxonomy ==
The Korean sandlance was first formally described in 1880 by the Austrian ichthyologist Franz Steindachner with its type locality given as Peter the Great Bay. Steindachner also classified in the monospecific genus Hypoptychus and in the monogeneric family Hypoptychidae. This family described a monotypic and is included in the suborder Gasterosteoidei of the order Scorpaeniformes in the 5th edition of Fishes of the World. Other authorities treat the Gasterosteoidei as the infraorder Gasterosteales within the suborder Cottoidei or as a sister clade to the Zoarcales in the order Zoarciformes. Some authorities include the tubenose (Aulichthys japonicus) in the Hypoptychidae, but the 5th edition of Fishes of the World puts this taxon in the family Aulorhynchidae.

== Etymology ==
The Korean sandlance's genus name, Hypoptychus, is a combination of hypo, which means "under", and ptychos, meaning "fold", an allusion to the long skin fin fold on the lower surface of the body in that taxon. The specific name likely honours the Polish biologist Benedykt Dybowski, who was a worker on the fauna of the Russian Far East.

== Description ==
The Korean sandlance has an elongate body which has no scales, scutes or spines. Its dorsal and anal fins are placed well back on the body towards the caudal fin, and they both have around 20 fin rays. There is no pelvic girdle or pelvic fins. The pectoral fin has 9 rays and the caudal fin has 13 main rays, 11 of which are branched. There is a broken ring around the eye. In males the premaxilla has teeth but not in females. There are around 29 pairs of pleural ribs, but there are no epipleurals, the vertebrae number roughly 55 to 57. The hypural plate is split into upper and lower halves, on most other members of the suborder, the other exception being the sticklebacks in the genus Gasterosteus the hypural plate is fused. This species has a maximum published total length of 10 cm (3.9 in). The smeitransparent head and body are reddish-yellow in colour marked with small black spot, these are larger around the front of the lower jaw and on the lower gill membrane. The fins are all semi-transparent and the membranes of dorsal and anal fins have small black melanophores.

== Distribution and habitat ==
The Korean sandlance is found in the northwestern Pacific Ocean where it occurs in the coastal waters off of northern Honshu and Hokkaido in Japan, Sakhalin, and the Kuril Islands. Its presence off the Korean coast has been confirmed. It is a benthopelagic species.

== Biology ==
The Korean sandlance forms schools of between 100 and 500 individuals. It is a major prey species for rockfishes and greenlings. Spawning takes place from mid-April to late June, and the healthy males are territorial but males which are less fit become "sneaker males wiktionary:sneaker male, i.e. pretending to be female to gain access to the females without defending a territory. The territorial males display to attract females, the female approaches the male's territory and lays eggs on the branching points of Sargassaceae seaweed, e.g. Sargassum horneri or Cystoseira hakodatensis. Study of the otoliths has shown that this species lives up to a year old, Like sticklebacks, it feeds on small invertebrates and fish larvae. Also like sticklebacks, it produces a sticky secretion from its kidneys when breeding. The parent uses the secretion to attach the eggs to sargassum.

== Utilisation ==
The Korean sandlance is fished for by commercial fisheries, however there is little information on the extent of this, or even on whether this still occurs.
