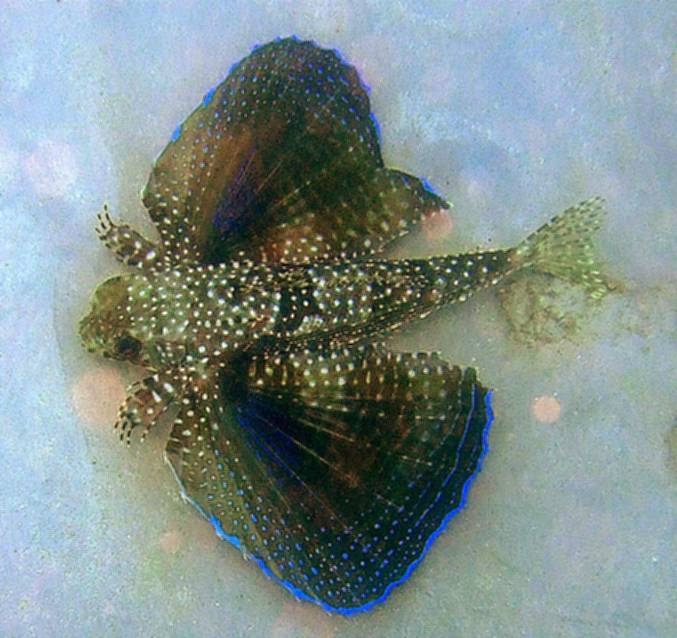
- Flying gurnard (Dactylopterus volitans)

Scientific classification
- Kingdom: Animalia
- Phylum: Chordata
- Class: Actinopterygii
- Division: Teleostei
- Order: Syngnathiformes
- Family: Dactylopteridae
- Genus: Dactylopterus; Lacépède, 1801

Species
- Dactylopterus volitans; †Dactylopterus decrozi

= Dactylopterus =

Dactylopterus Temporal range: Miocene - Recent

Genus of fishes

Dactylopterus is a genus of fish belonging into the family Dactylopteridae. It contains two species, an extant species, Dactylopterus volitans and the fossil species Dactylopterus decrozi from the Miocene of Panama.
