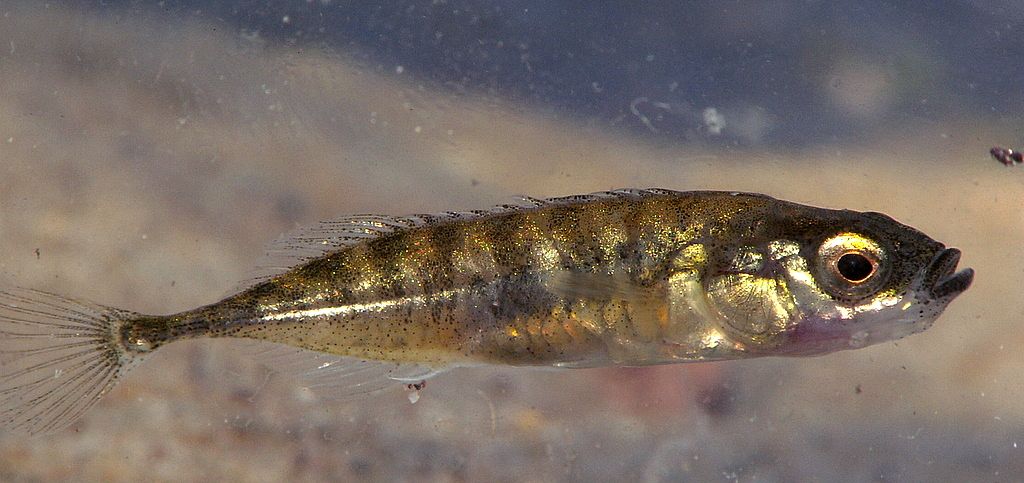
- Nine-spined stickleback (P. pungitius)

Scientific classification
- Kingdom: Animalia
- Phylum: Chordata
- Class: Actinopterygii
- Order: Perciformes
- Family: Gasterosteidae
- Genus: Pungitius d'Annone, 1760

Type species
- Gasterosteus pungitius (Linnaeus, 1758)

Species
- See text

= Pungitius =

Pungitius Temporal range: Late Miocene to Present

Genus of fishes

Pungitius is a genus of sticklebacks.

== Species ==
There are currently ten recognized species in this genus:

- Pungitius bussei (Warpachowski, 1888)
- Pungitius hellenicus Stephanidis, 1971 (Ellinopygósteos)
- Pungitius laevis (G. Cuvier, 1829) (Smoothtail ninespined stickleback)
- Pungitius modestus Matsumoto, Matsuura & Hanzawa, 2021
- Pungitius platygaster (Kessler, 1859) (Southern ninespined stickleback)
- Pungitius polyakovi S. V. Shedko, M. B. Shedko & Pietsch, 2005
- Pungitius pungitius (Linnaeus, 1758) (Ninespined stickleback)
- Pungitius sinensis (Guichenot, 1869) (Amur stickleback)
- Pungitius stenurus (Kessler, 1876)
- Pungitius tymensis (A. M. Nikolskii, 1889) (Sakhalin stickleback)
