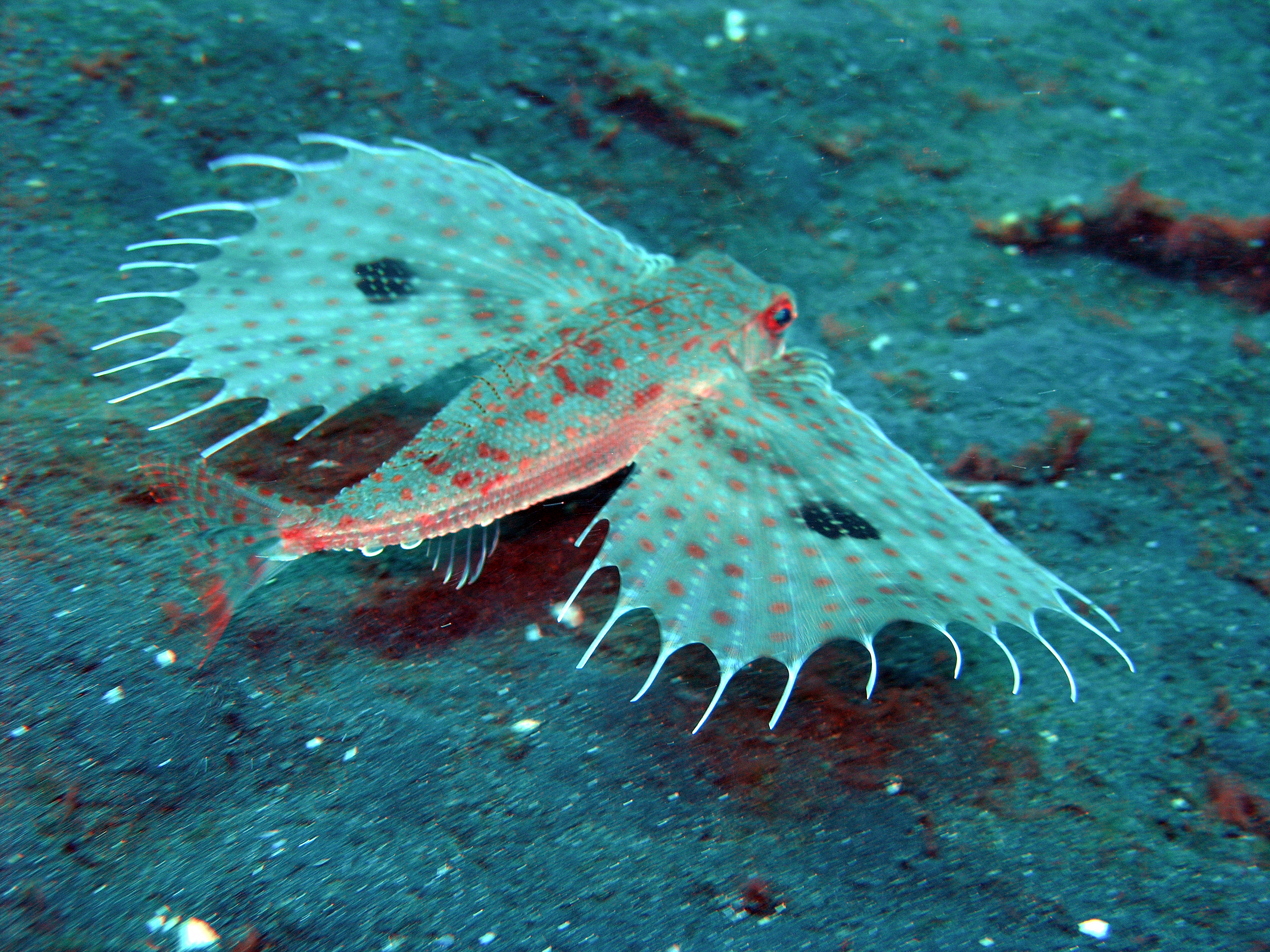
- Oriental flying gurnard (D. orientalis)

Scientific classification
- Kingdom: Animalia
- Phylum: Chordata
- Class: Actinopterygii
- Order: Syngnathiformes
- Family: Dactylopteridae
- Genus: Dactyloptena; D. S. Jordan & R. E. Richardson, 1908

Type species
- Dactylopterus orientalis Cuvier, 1829

= Dactyloptena =

Genus of fishes

Dactyloptena is a genus of flying gurnards native to the Indian and Pacific Oceans.

== Species ==
Currently, six recognized species are in this genus:

- Dactyloptena gilberti Snyder, 1909
- Dactyloptena macracantha (Bleeker, 1855) (spotwing flying gurnard)
- Dactyloptena orientalis (G. Cuvier, 1829) (Oriental flying gurnard)
- Dactyloptena papilio J. D. Ogilby, 1910 (butterfly flying gurnard)
- Dactyloptena peterseni (Nyström, 1887) (starry flying gurnard)
- Dactyloptena tiltoni Eschmeyer, 1997 (plain helmet gurnard)
