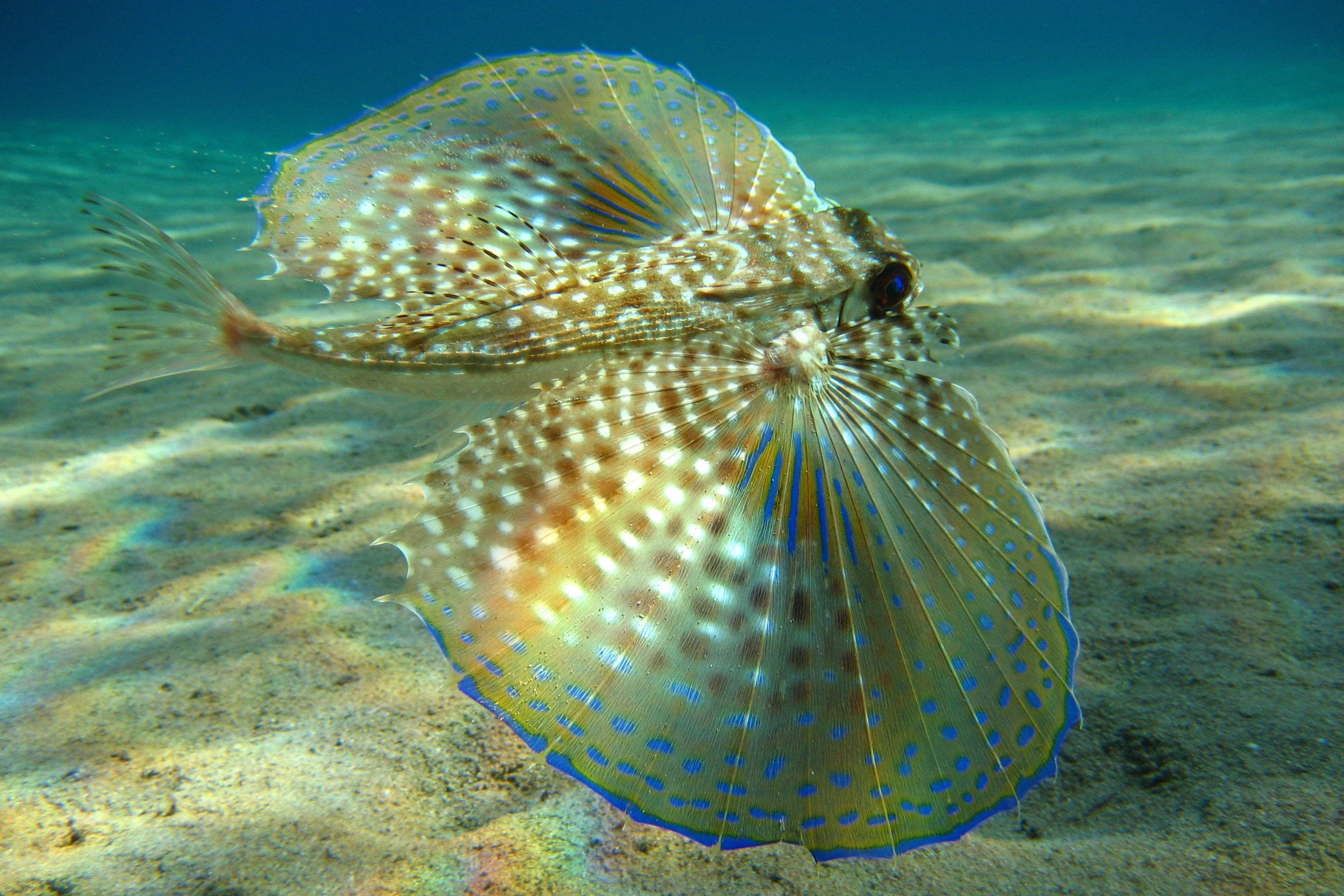
- Dactylopterus volitans

Scientific classification
- Kingdom: Animalia
- Phylum: Chordata
- Class: Actinopterygii
- Division: Teleostei
- Clade: Percomorpha
- Order: Syngnathiformes
- Suborder: Dactylopteroidei
- Family: Dactylopteridae; Gill, 1861

Genera
- Dactyloptena D. S. Jordan & R. E. Richardson, 1908; Dactylopterus Lacépède, 1801

= Dactylopteridae =

Flying gurnards

Family of fishes

The flying gurnards are a family, Dactylopteridae, of marine fish notable for their greatly enlarged pectoral fins. As they cannot literally fly or glide in the air (like flying fish), an alternative name preferred by some authors is helmet gurnards. They have been regarded as the only family in the suborder Dactylopteroidei of the Scorpaeniformes. However, more recent molecular classifications put them in the order Syngnathiformes, in the superfamily Centriscoidea.

They have been observed to "walk" along sandy sea floors while looking for crustaceans, other small invertebrates and small fish by using their pelvic fins. Like the true gurnards (sea robins), to which they may be related, they possess a swim bladder with two lobes and a "drumming muscle" that can beat against the swim bladder to produce sounds. They have heavy, protective scales and the undersides of their huge pectoral fins are brightly coloured, perhaps to startle predators.

Most species are in the Indo-Pacific genus Dactyloptena, but the single member of Dactylopterus is from warmer parts of the Atlantic. The adults live on the sea bottom, but many species have an extended larval stage, which floats freely in the oceans.

== Taxonomy ==
Morphological traits uniting the flying gurnards (Dactylopteridae) and the Syngnathiformes have long been noted. Most authors placed them with the Scorpaeniformes, but DNA sequence data quite consistently support the view that the latter are paraphyletic with the Gasterosteiformes sensu lato. Flying gurnards are particularly close to the Aulostomidae (trumpetfish) and Fistulariidae (cornetfish), and would have to be included with these.

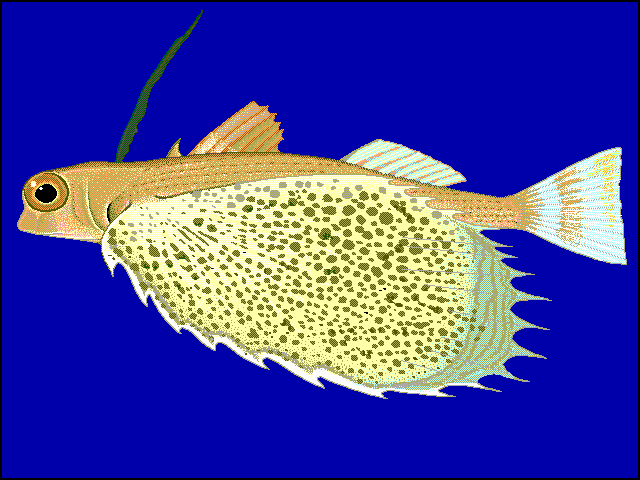
Dactyloptena orientalis

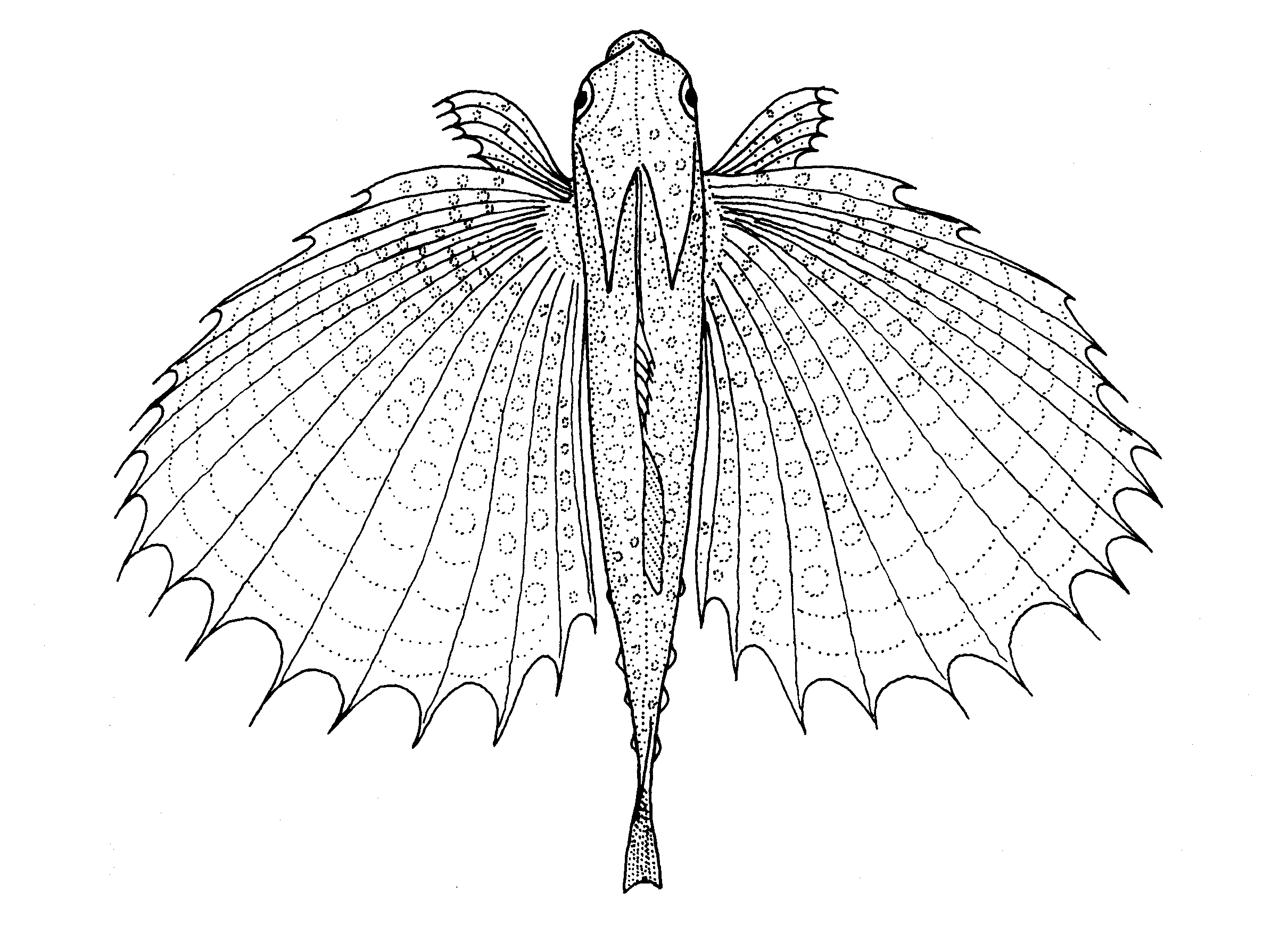
D. orientalis

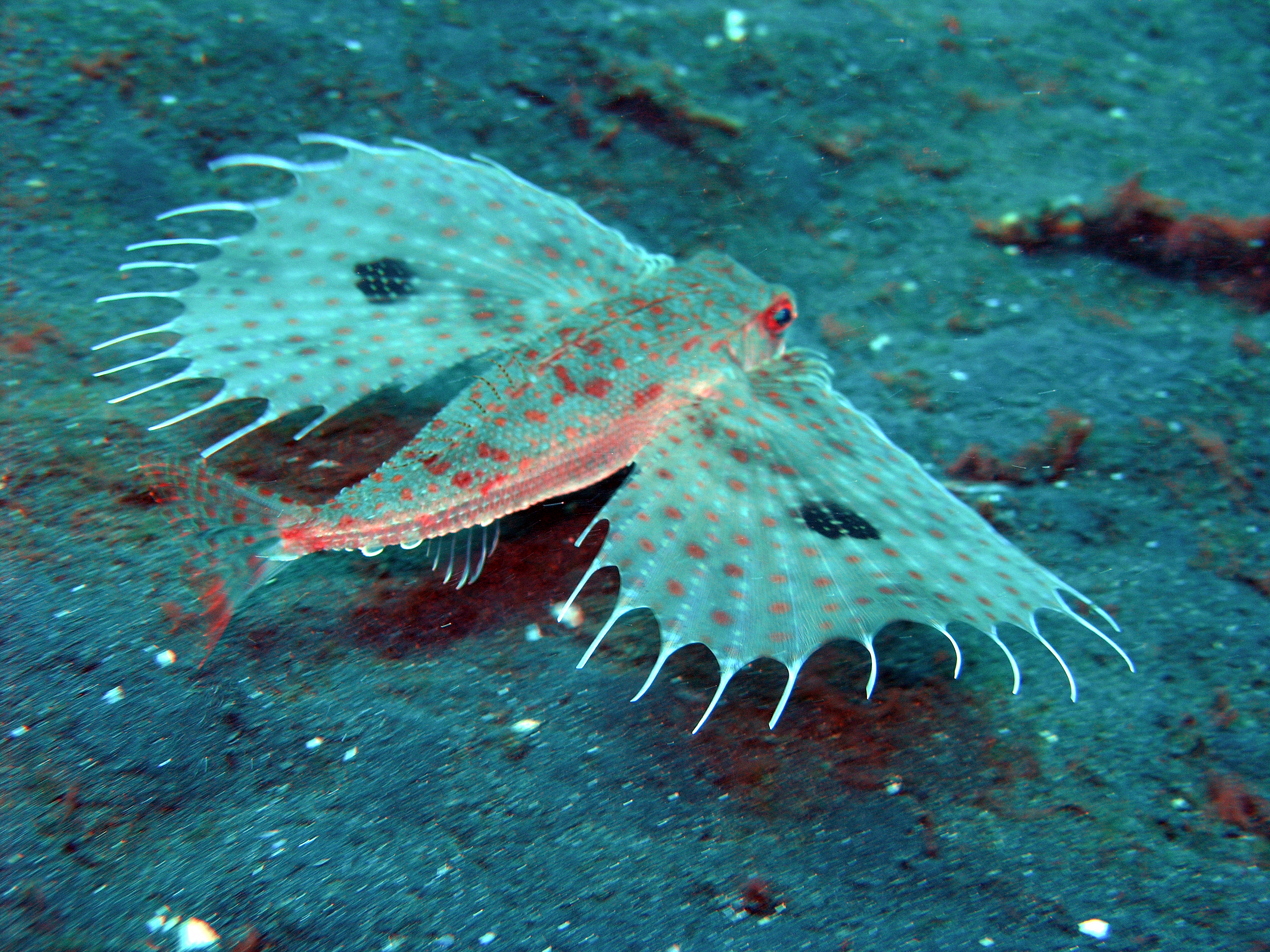
D. orientalis

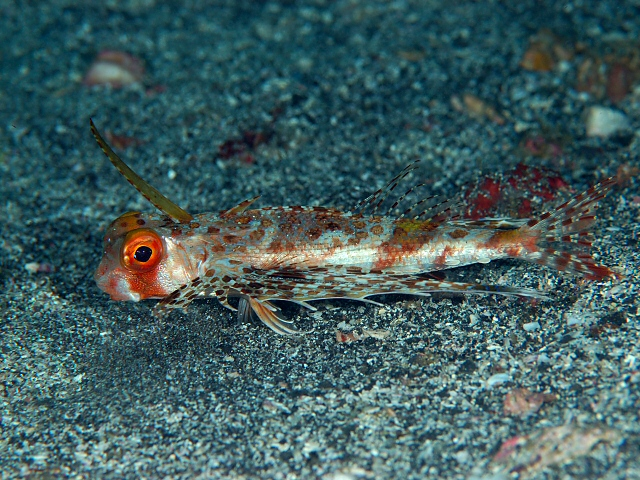
D. orientalis

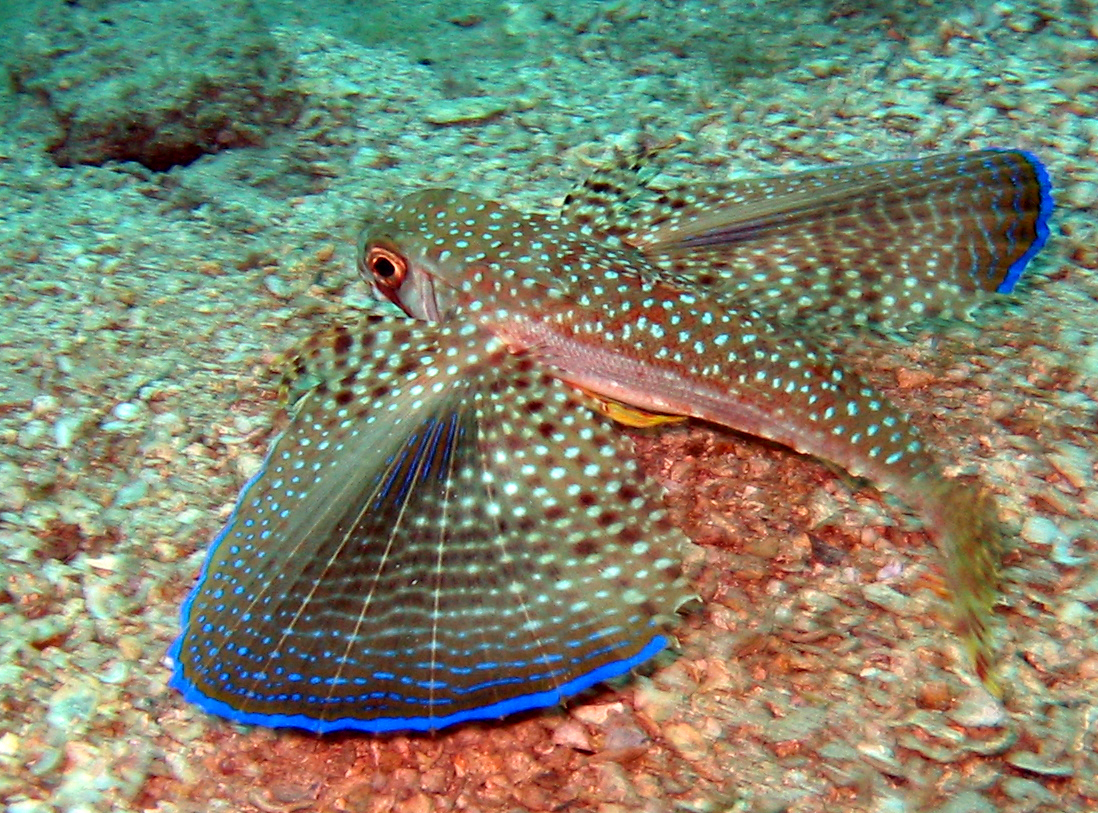
Dactylopterus volitans

== See also ==
- List of fish families
