= Spinachia =

- Sea Stickleback (Spinachia spinachia)

Conservation status
- Least Concern (IUCN 3.1)

Scientific classification
- Kingdom: Animalia
- Phylum: Chordata
- Class: Actinopterygii
- Division: Teleostei
- Order: Perciformes
- Family: Gasterosteidae
- Genus: Spinachia; G. Cuvier, 1816
- Species: S. spinachia

Binomial name
- Spinachia spinachia (Linnaeus, 1758)

Synonyms
- Gasterosteus spinachia Linnaeus, 1758; Spinachia vulgaris Fleming, 1828

Species of fish

Spinachia is a monospecific genus of ray-finned fish belonging to the family Gasterosteidae, the sticklebacks. The only species in the genus is Spinachia spinachia, the sea stickleback, fifteen-spined stickleback or fifteenspine stickleback, a species which lives in benthopelagic and in brackish environments of the northeastern Atlantic Ocean. This species, the largest of the sticklebacks, grows to a length of 22 centimetres (8.7 in) SL. This species is the only known member of its genus Spinachia. It is of no interest as a commercial fish.

== Description ==
The fifteen-spined stickleback is an elongated fish with a long slender snout, an elongated caudal peduncle about one third of the total length, and a fan-like rounded caudal fin. The anterior dorsal fin consists of a series of fourteen to fifteen small, widely separated spines. The posterior dorsal fin and the anal fin are aligned and are similar in size and shape and located immediately anterior to the caudal peduncle. The pelvic fins consist of spines. This fish is brownish-yellow with indistinct dark markings and a silvery belly. It grows to a maximum size of 22 centimetres (8.7 in), but the usual size range is 8 to 15 cm (3 to 6 in).

== Distribution and habitat ==
The fifteen-spined stickleback is native to coastal waters in the northeastern Atlantic Ocean where it lives among bladderwrack and eel grass.

== Biology ==
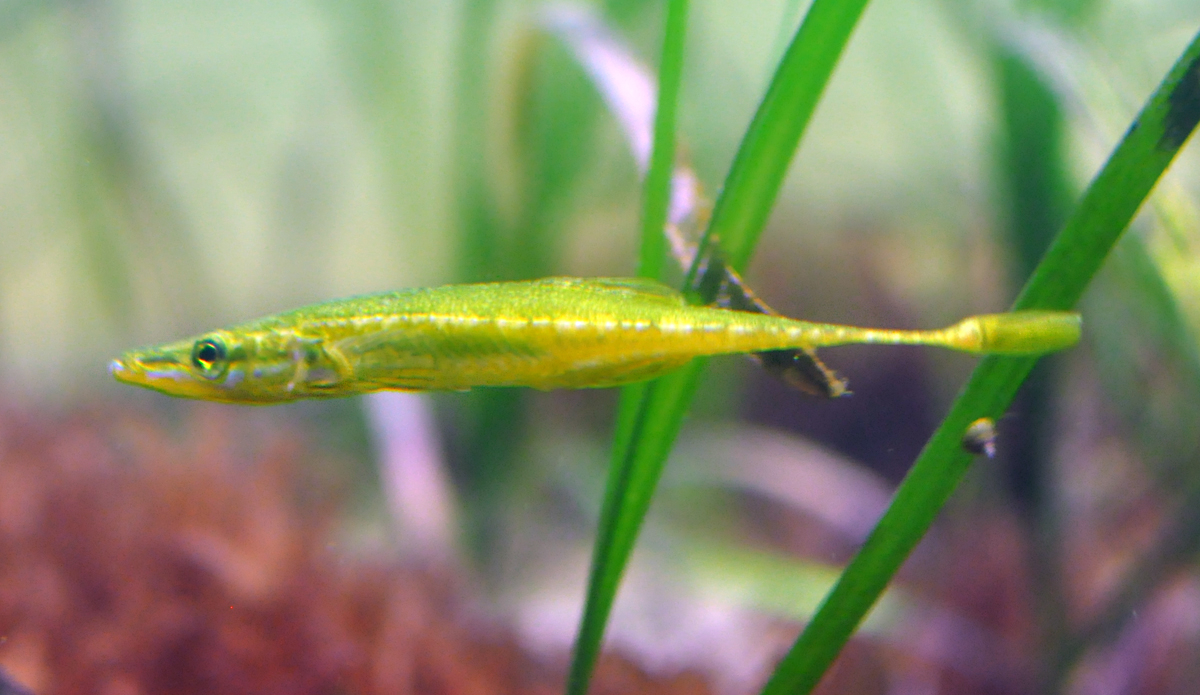

The fifteen-spined stickleback is a solitary fish and a predator that lurks among concealing vegetation ready to pounce on plankton and fish fry which drift too close. Breeding takes place in May and June among bladderwrack, with males building nests out of bits of seaweed, and guarding and fanning the eggs with his fins until they hatch. The males continue to care for the fry until they have absorbed the contents of their egg yolks and can feed for themselves. It is thought that adults die after spawning.
