= J. Carson Brevoort =

American collector

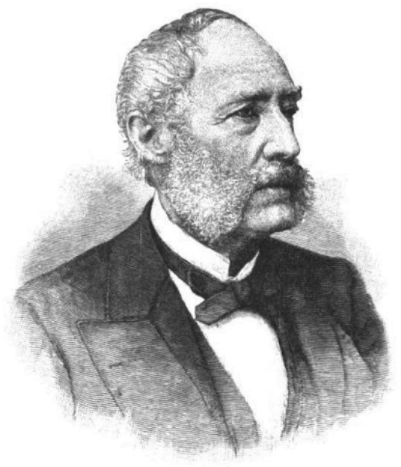
- Born: July 10, 1818; Bloomingdale District
- Died: December 7, 1887; Brooklyn

James Carson Brevoort (July 10, 1818 – December 7, 1887) was an American collector of rare books and coins. He served as superintendent of the Astor Library for two years, also serving as trustee.

== Biography ==
J. Carson Brevoort was born in Bloomingdale, Manhattan on July 10, 1818. He received his early education at home, in France, and at Hofwyl, near Berne, Switzerland. He then studied at the École Centrale des Arts et Manufactures in Paris, and was graduated with the diploma of a civil engineer.

On returning to the United States, he accompanied his uncle, James Renwick, one of the commissioners on the northeastern boundary survey. In 1838 he went abroad as private secretary to Washington Irving, U.S. Minister to Spain. After serving a year in this capacity, he spent several years in European travel, and returned home in 1843. Two years later he married the daughter of Judge Leffert Lefferts, of Brooklyn, where he afterward resided, serving on the board of education, and as one of the constructing board of water commissioners.

He became a regent of the University of New York in 1861, and the same year received the degree of LL.D. from Williams College. For ten years, beginning in 1863, he was president of the Long Island Historical Society. In 1868, he was elected a member of the American Antiquarian Society. For two years, March 1876 to February 1878, he was superintendent of the Astor Library in New York City, of which he had been a trustee since 1852. He oversaw the beginning of a card catalog for the Astor collection. He resigned as a trustee in September 1878. He was a member of the New York Historical Society, the Academy of Natural Sciences, the American Geographical Society, the Massachusetts Historical Society, the Pennsylvania Historical Society, and numerous other scientific, literary, and artistic associations, in which he was always actively involved.

He was a collector of rare books and coins. From his father, Henry Brevoort, he inherited about 6,000 volumes, mostly Americana, which were collected in Europe during the turbulent years from 1810 until 1832. To this library, Brevoort made large additions, until in 1875 it comprised about 10,000 volumes, many of them very rare and costly. He also collected medals and manuscripts. About 1875 he began to bestow many of his treasures upon various institutions. His collections also embraced entomology and ichthyology (books and specimens). Brevoort removed, in early life, to Yonkers, but returned to New York and was a member of the Common Council for many years. Brevoort married Elizabeth Dorothea Lefferts in 1845, and they had one child, Henry L. Brevoort (1849-1895). In 1852, he moved to Rye.

He died at his home in Brooklyn on December 7, 1887.

His friend, the ichthyologist Theodore Nicholas Gill, honored Brevoort in the specific name of a fish, the hairfin lookdown (Selene brevoortii).

== Works ==
He contributed to the American Journal of Numismatics a series of illustrated papers on "Early Spanish and Portuguese Coinage in America." In the Historical Magazine he published a paper on the discovery of the remains of Columbus, and in 1874 prepared a volume, printed privately, entitled Verrazano the Navigator, or Notes on Giovanni de Verrazano, and on a Planisphere of 1529, illustrating his American Voyage in 1524, this being a revision and expansion of a paper read before the American Geographical Society, November 28, 1871.
