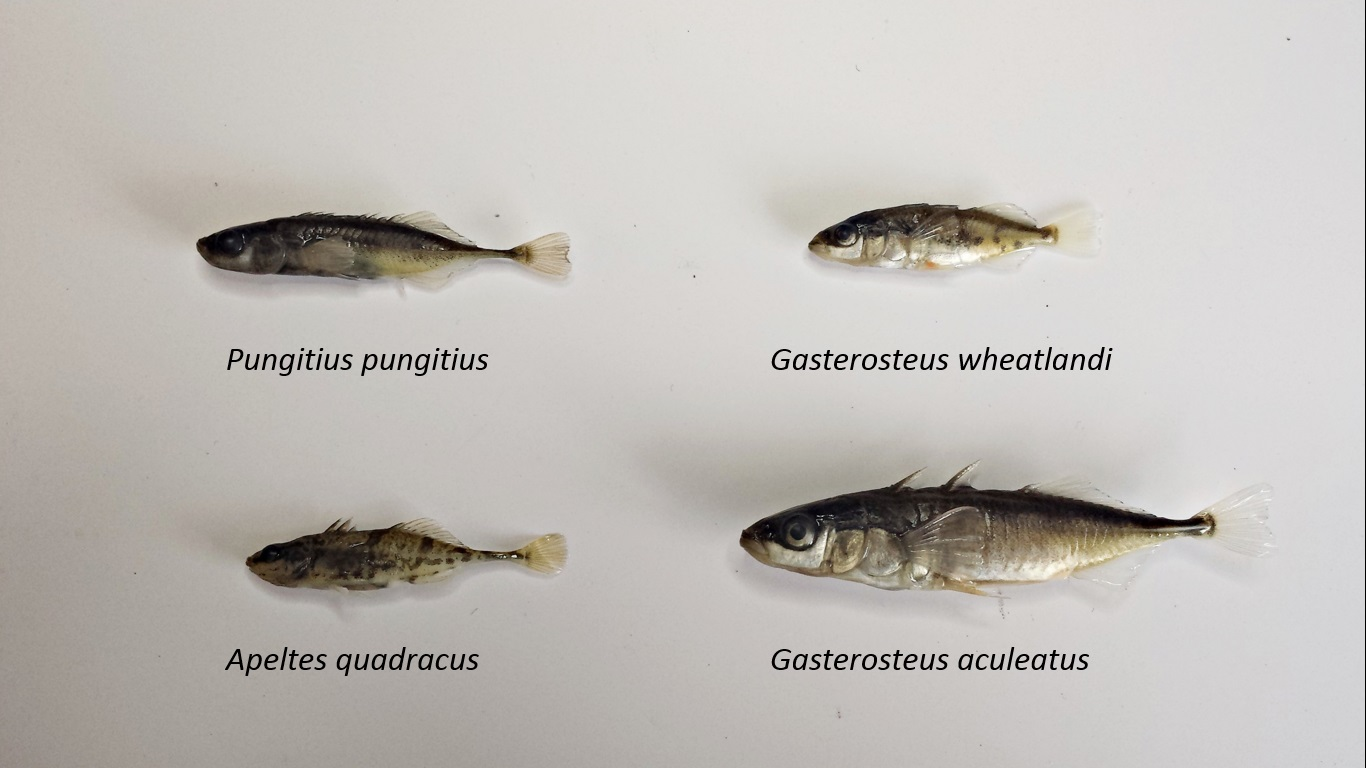
- Four marine species of stickleback from the Atlantic Ocean coast of North America

Scientific classification
- Kingdom: Animalia
- Phylum: Chordata
- Class: Actinopterygii
- Order: Perciformes
- Suborder: Gasterosteoidei
- Family: Gasterosteidae; Bonaparte, 1831

Genera
- see text

= Stickleback =

Sticklebacks

Family of ray-finned fish

The sticklebacks are a family of ray-finned fishes, the Gasterosteidae which have a Holarctic distribution in fresh, brackish and marine waters. They were thought to be related to the pipefish and seahorses but are now thought to be more closely related to the eelpouts and sculpins.

== Taxonomy ==
The stickleback family, Gasterosteidae, was first proposed as a family by the French zoologist Charles Lucien Bonaparte in 1831. It was long thought that the sticklebacks and their relatives comprise a suborder, the Gasterosteoidei, of the order Gasterostiformes with the sea horses and pipefishes making up the suborder Syngnathoidei. More recent phylogenetic work has shown that the Gaterosteoidei are more closely related to the Zoarcoidei and the Cottoidei, which would mean that this taxon would belong in the order Scorpaeniformes. However, in other phylogenetic classifications it is treated as the infraorder Gasterosteales within the suborder Cottoidei or as a sister clade to the Zoarcales in the order Zoarciformes.

FishBase recognises 16 species in the family, grouped in five genera. However, several of the species have a number of recognised subspecies, and the taxonomy of the family is thought to be in need of revision.

=== Genera ===
The family Gasterosteidae includes the following genera:

- Apeltes DeKay, 1842
- Culaea Whitley, 1950
- Gasterosteus Linnaeus, 1758
- Pungitius d'Annone, 1760
- Spinachia Cuvier, 1816

== Description ==
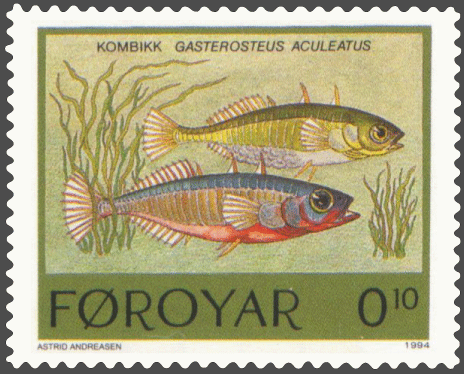
1994 Faroe Islands postage stamp with three-spined sticklebacks

Sticklebacks are endemic to the temperate zone and are most commonly found in the ocean, but some can be found in fresh water. The freshwater taxa were trapped in Europe, Asia and North America after the last Ice Age 10,000–20,000 years ago and have evolved features different from those of the marine species.

Sticklebacks are carnivorous, feeding on small animals such as insects, crustaceans and fish larvae.

Sticklebacks are characterised by the presence of strong and clearly isolated spines in their dorsal fins. An unusual feature of sticklebacks is that they have no scales, although some species have bony armour plates.

=== Sizes ===
The maximum size of the best-known species, the three-spined stickleback (Gasterosteus aculeatus), is about 4 inches, but few of them are more than 3 inches long. They mature sexually at a length of about 2 inches. Most other stickleback species are roughly similar in size or somewhat smaller. The only exception is the far larger fifteen-spined stickleback (Spinachia spinachia), which can reach 22 cm (approx. 8.8 inches). Body form varies with habitat: sticklebacks in shallow lakes have developed a deep body specialized to enable feeding on benthic invertebrates, whilst those in deep oligotrophic lakes have adapted to feed on plankton and have slimmer bodies.

=== Personality ===
Research has shown that individual sticklebacks display distinct personality traits, specifically in the area of taking a risk, and can be considered bold or shy. These personality traits were determined to directly influence if they would lead, and, if discouraged, attempt to lead again.

== Mating ==
All stickleback species show similar, unusual mating behaviour. Freshwater males develop a red colouration, and although this may be seen in oceanic and benthic species these tend to remain dull-coloured. The male then constructs a nest from weeds held together by spiggin, a kidney secretion, then attract females to the nest. Females signal their readiness to mate with solitary rather than shoaling behaviour, a head-up posture; their bellies are also obviously distended with eggs. Courtship typically involves a zig-zag 'dance' where the male approaches the female in an erratic side-to-side pattern, and dorsal pricking of the female's abdomen. A female lays her eggs inside the nest, where the male fertilises them. The male then guards the eggs until they hatch 7–14 days later (depending on temperature), and may continue to guard the fry after they hatch. This large investment in both the nesting site and guarding of the eggs limits the number of females a male can mate with however males spawn multiple times. This introduces the ability for selection to favor male mate choice. Some males die following spawning.

=== Mating choice ===
Typically, the sex with the greatest parental investment has the strongest mate preferences. Stickleback species exhibit mutual mate choice in which both the male and female have strong mate preferences. This is due in part to the strong parental investment on behalf of the male in guarding the eggs.

=== Female mate choice ===
Female sticklebacks show a strong preference to male stickleback with bright red coloration under their throats. Females mate both more often with males with brighter red coloration and give on average, larger eggs to be fertilized by these males. This preference has led to brighter red coloring. This association is possible because the red coloration can only be produced by males that are free of parasites. This is referred to in the Hamilton–Zuk hypothesis.

However, there is also evidence that attractive male red coloration may be a faulty signal of male quality. Male sticklebacks that are more attractive to females due to carotenoid colorants may under-allocate carotenoids to their germline cells. Since carotinoids are beneficial antioxidants, their under-allocation to germline cells can lead to increased oxidative DNA damage to these cells. Therefore, female sticklebacks may risk fertility and the viability of their offspring by choosing redder, but more deteriorated partners with reduced sperm quality.

Female mate choice has also been seen to be condition dependent. Females are almost always the more choosy sex in most species. Female sticklebacks though, have been found to be less choosy of mates when in poor physical condition and inversely, more choosy in good condition.

=== Male mate choice ===
In some species, such as the three-spined stickleback, the large investment in both nesting site and guarding of eggs by males limits the number of females a male can mate with. This introduces the ability for selection to favor male mate choice. Male mate choice is rarely studied or observed in many species but multiple studies have confirmed male mate choice within stickleback species. Males show a choosiness similar to females as to what female they are willing to court and mate. Male sticklebacks have been observed to show preference towards female sticklebacks that are larger and longer. This is believed to be because larger females on average produce larger eggs, which leads to a greater offspring survival and fitness. In addition, male sticklebacks have also been observed to prefer females with more distended or bloated stomachs. The benefits of this is also due to larger eggs and thus offspring survival and fitness.

=== Inbreeding avoidance ===
Female three-spined sticklebacks adjust their courting behaviour to the risk of inbreeding. When gravid females are given the choice between a courting unfamiliar non-sibling and a familiar brother, they prefer to mate with the non-sibling and thus avoid the disadvantages that accompany incest. Eggs from inbred matings have a lower rate of fertilization and hatching than those from outbred matings and fewer progeny survive to reproductive age.

== Use in science ==
Niko Tinbergen's studies of the behaviour of this fish were important in the early development of ethology as an example of a fixed action pattern. More recently, the fish have become a favourite system for studying the molecular genetics of evolutionary change in wild populations and a "supermodel" for combining evolutionary studies at molecular, developmental, population genetic, and ecological levels. The nearly complete genome sequence of a reference freshwater stickleback was described in 2012, along with set of genetic variants commonly found in 21 marine and freshwater populations around the world. Some variants, and several chromosome inversions, consistently distinguish marine and freshwater populations, helping identify a genome-wide set of changes contributing to repeated adaptation of sticklebacks to marine and freshwater environments. The adaptations seen in oceanic threespine sticklebacks make them an ideal organism for the study of parallel evolution.

== In culture ==
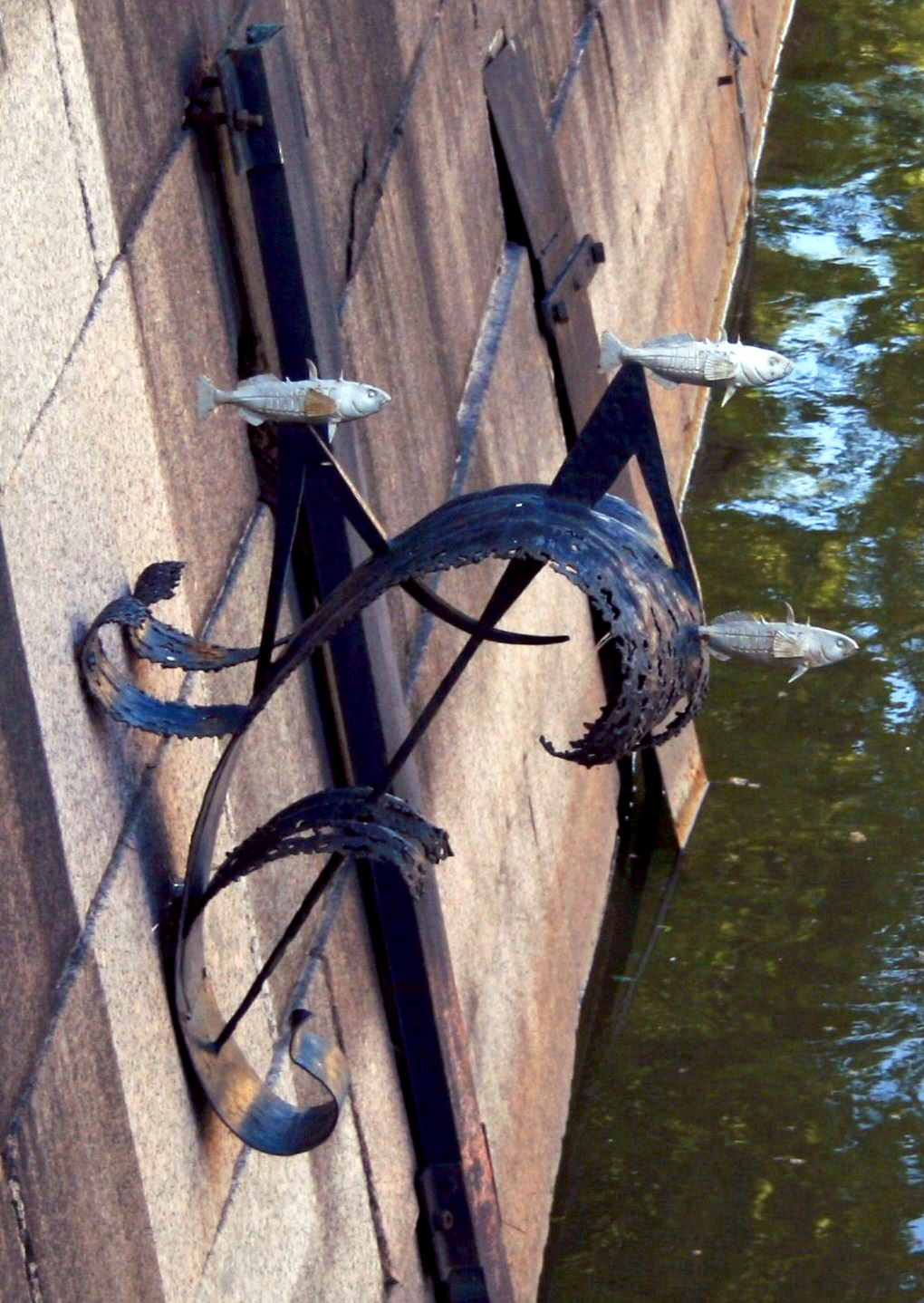
Monument to the siege stickleback

There is a sculpture in Kronstadt dedicated to stickleback, which saved thousands of city residents from starvation during the Leningrad Siege of World War II.
