= Ammersee =

Lake in Upper Bavaria, Germany

Ammersee Lake Ammer
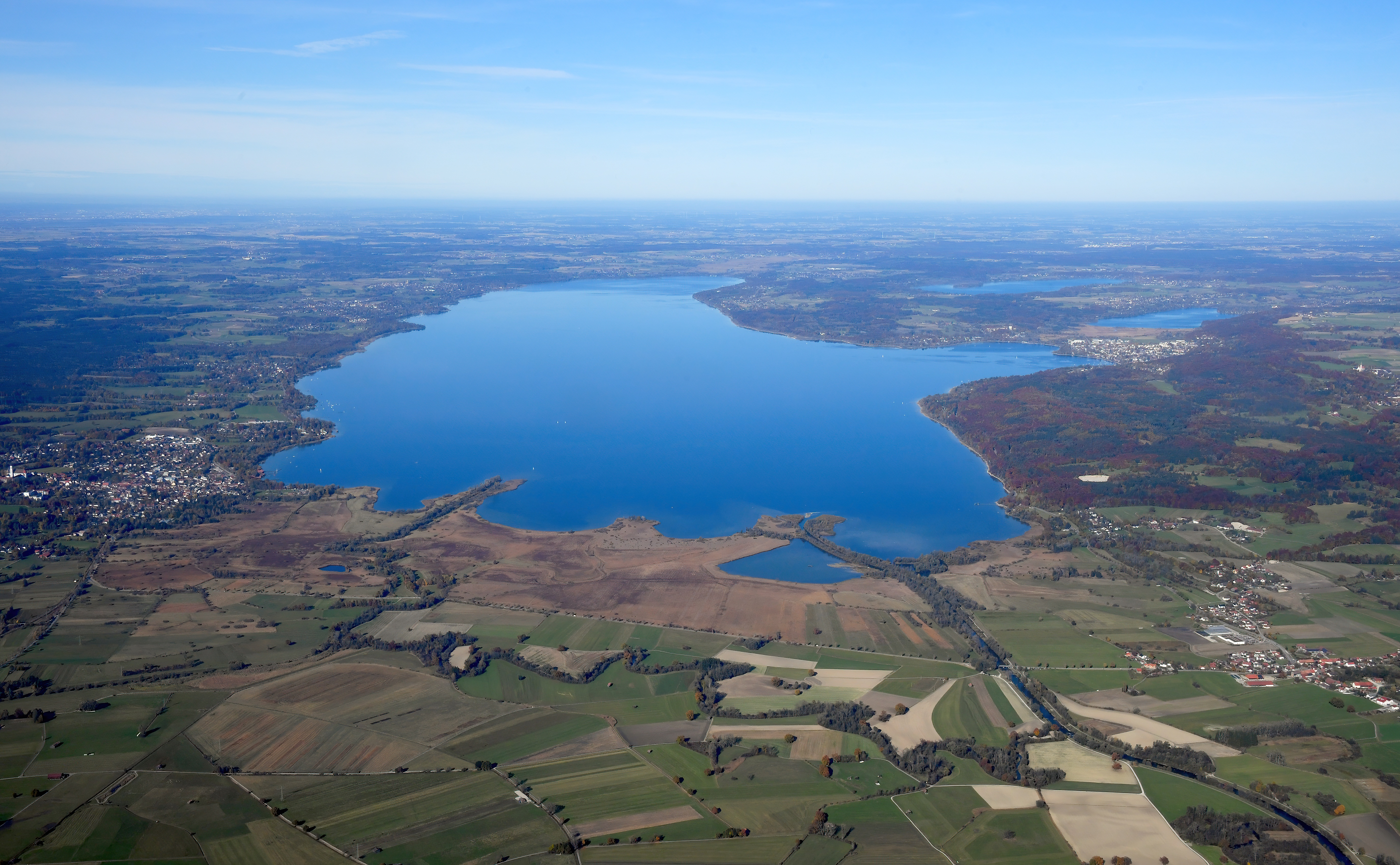
- Aerial view of the Ammersee from the south

- Location within Germany
- Location: Upper Bavaria
- Coordinates: 48°00′N 11°07′E
- Primary inflows: River Ammer
- Primary outflows: Amper
- Catchment area: 993.0 km^{2} (383.4 sq mi)
- Basin countries: Germany
- Max. length: 16.2 km (10.1 mi)
- Max. width: 5 km (3.1 mi)
- Surface area: 46.6 km^{2} (18.0 sq mi)
- Average depth: 37.8 m (124 ft)
- Max. depth: 81 m (266 ft)
- Residence time: 2.7 years
- Surface elevation: 533 m (1,749 ft)
- Islands: Schwedeninsel
- Settlements: Herrsching, Dießen am Ammersee, Schondorf, Breitbrunn, Utting, Buch, Riederau, Eching, Inning

Ramsar Wetland
- Designated: 26 February 1976
- Reference no.: 93

Ammersee (German pronunciation: [ˈamɐˌzeː]; English: Lake Ammer) is a Zungenbecken lake in Upper Bavaria, Germany, southwest of Munich between the towns of Herrsching and Dießen am Ammersee. With a surface area of approximately 47 square kilometres (18 sq mi), it is the sixth largest lake in Germany. The lake is at an elevation of 533 metres (1,749 ft), and has a maximum depth of 81 metres (266 ft). Like other Bavarian lakes, Ammersee developed as a result of the ice age glaciers melting. Ammersee is fed by the River Ammer, which flows as the Amper out of the lake. Like neighbouring Lake Starnberg - deeper, bigger in surface area, similar in shape - it is a popular location for watersports.

Ammersee and the Amper are part of the ancient Celtic amber trading route leading to the Brenner Pass. The word Ammer is a 13th-century form of Amper, the Celtic *ambra, deriving from the Indo-European *ombh-, *mbh- "wet, Water".

Passenger services have operated on the lake since 1879. Today they are operated by the Bayerische Seenschifffahrt company, using a mixture of historic paddle steamers and motor ships.

== Ecology, biology and conservation ==
The water quality, which was endangered in the 1960s, was significantly improved by comprehensive wastewater remediation measures such as the construction of a ring main, the commissioning of the sewage treatment plant in Eching in 1971 and the rehabilitation of the sewage treatment plants in the Ammer catchment area. Further information on the history and development of the Eching wastewater treatment plant is provided by AWA-Ammersee, which manages drinking water and wastewater in the region. Since the mid-1980s, the nutrient load of the water has shifted from the eutrophic to the mesotrophic range, which means that the nutrient load is low to moderate, the production of algae is moderate, and the average visual depth is over 2 m. The use of the Ammersee as a bathing water is thus secured in the long term.

Among the fish living in the lake, an endemic whitefish (Coregonus bavaricus) is known, a whitefish species mainly found in the pre-Alpine lakes, whose occurrence has led to a long tradition of quite intensive fishing exploitation of the lake. The lake is also home of the vulnerable species of deepwater char Salvelinus evasus. Deepwater char are highly sensitive to changes in the quality of the water and some species such as Salvelinus neocomensis and Salvelinus profundus were driven recently to extinction in other European lakes. In 2010, even a new species of fish, the Ammersee Kaulbarsch (Gymnocephalus ambriaelacus), which is also found only in the Ammersee, was described.

With the nature reserves Vogelfreistätte Ammersee-Südufer (in which the Schwedeninsel is also located), Seeholz and Seewiese as well as Ampermoos, the Ammersee is one of the seven internationally important wetlands in Bavaria according to the so-called Ramsar Convention. On the western shore, access to the shore is closed to the general public except for short stretches, but almost the entire eastern shore is open to the public. Large areas of the shore are still in a near-natural state, but the formerly dense reed beds have decreased significantly since the end of the 1960s. In contrast, microplastic pollution has increased.

== Gallery ==
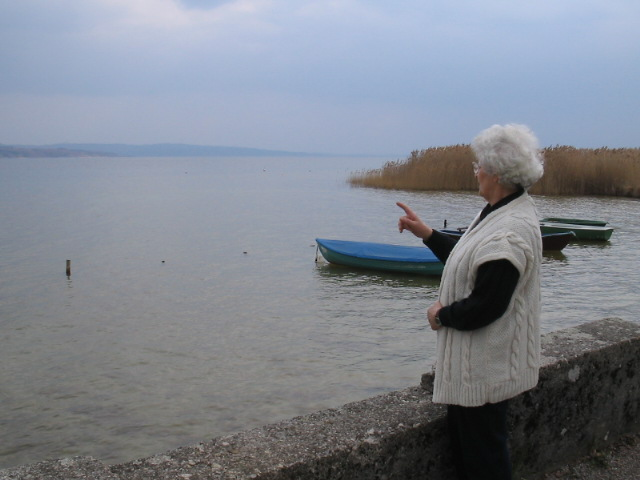
Eastern shore

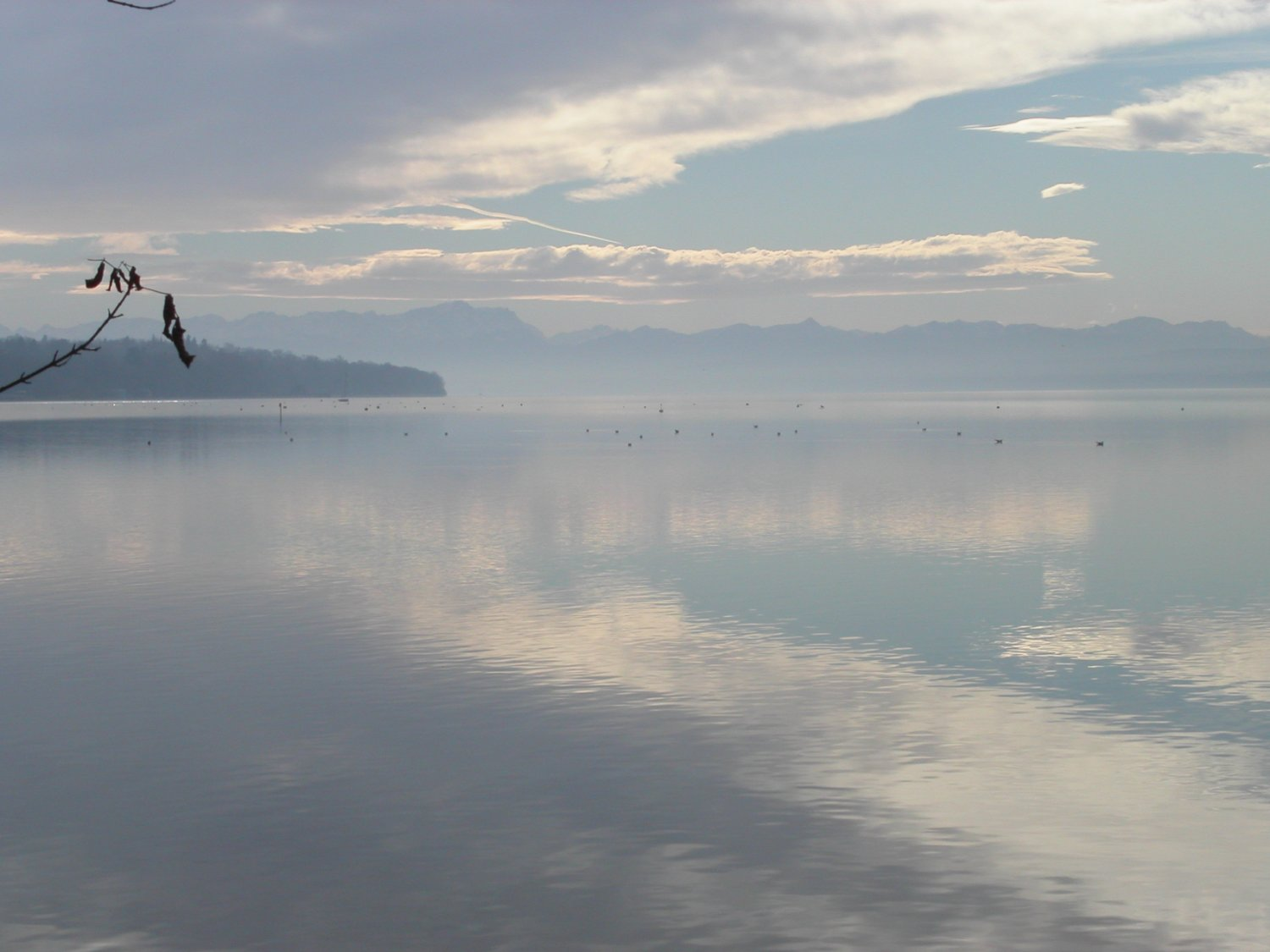
Autumn

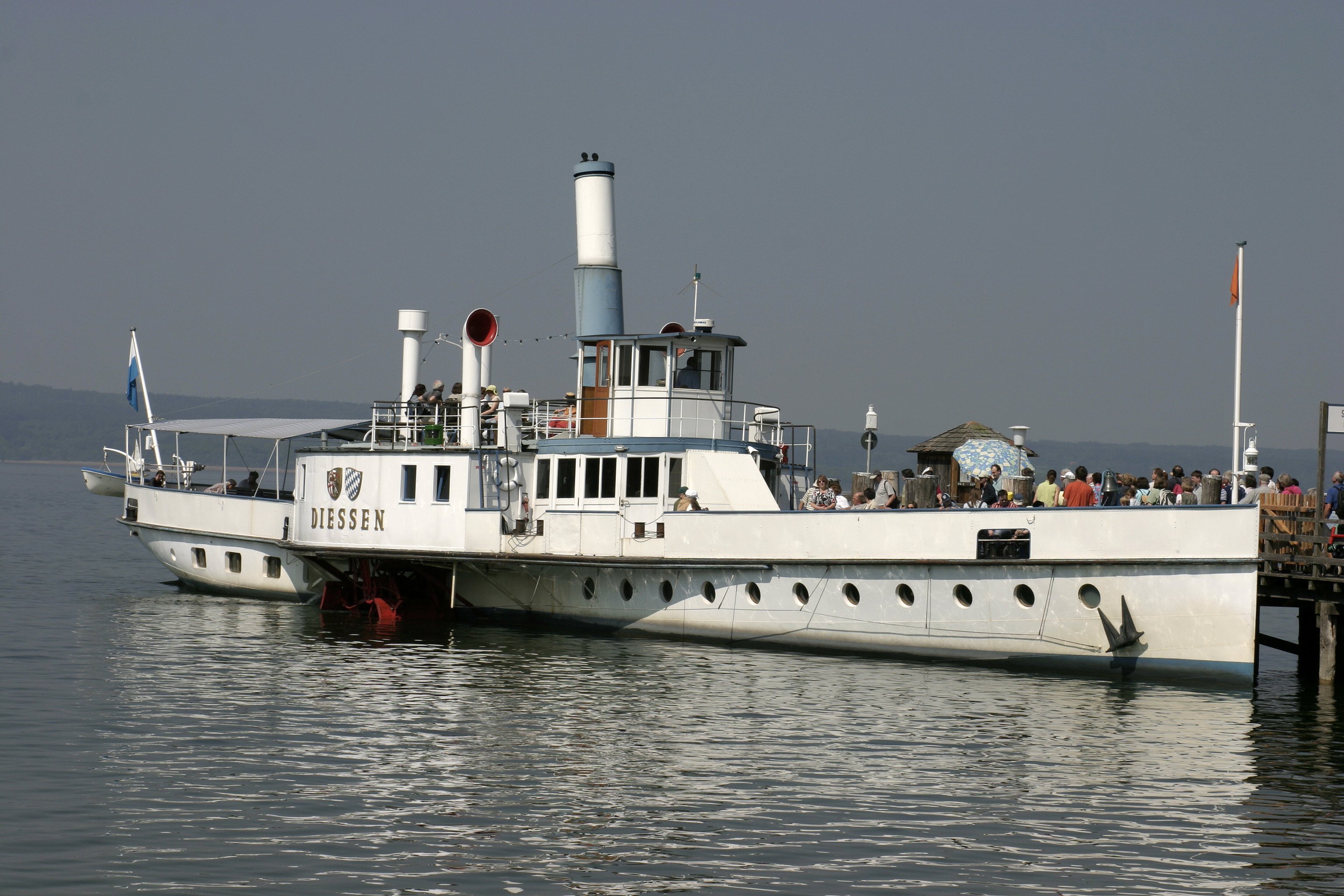
Paddle Steamer Diessen on the lake

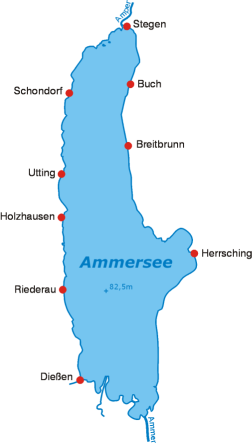
Map of lake with settlements and deepest point marked

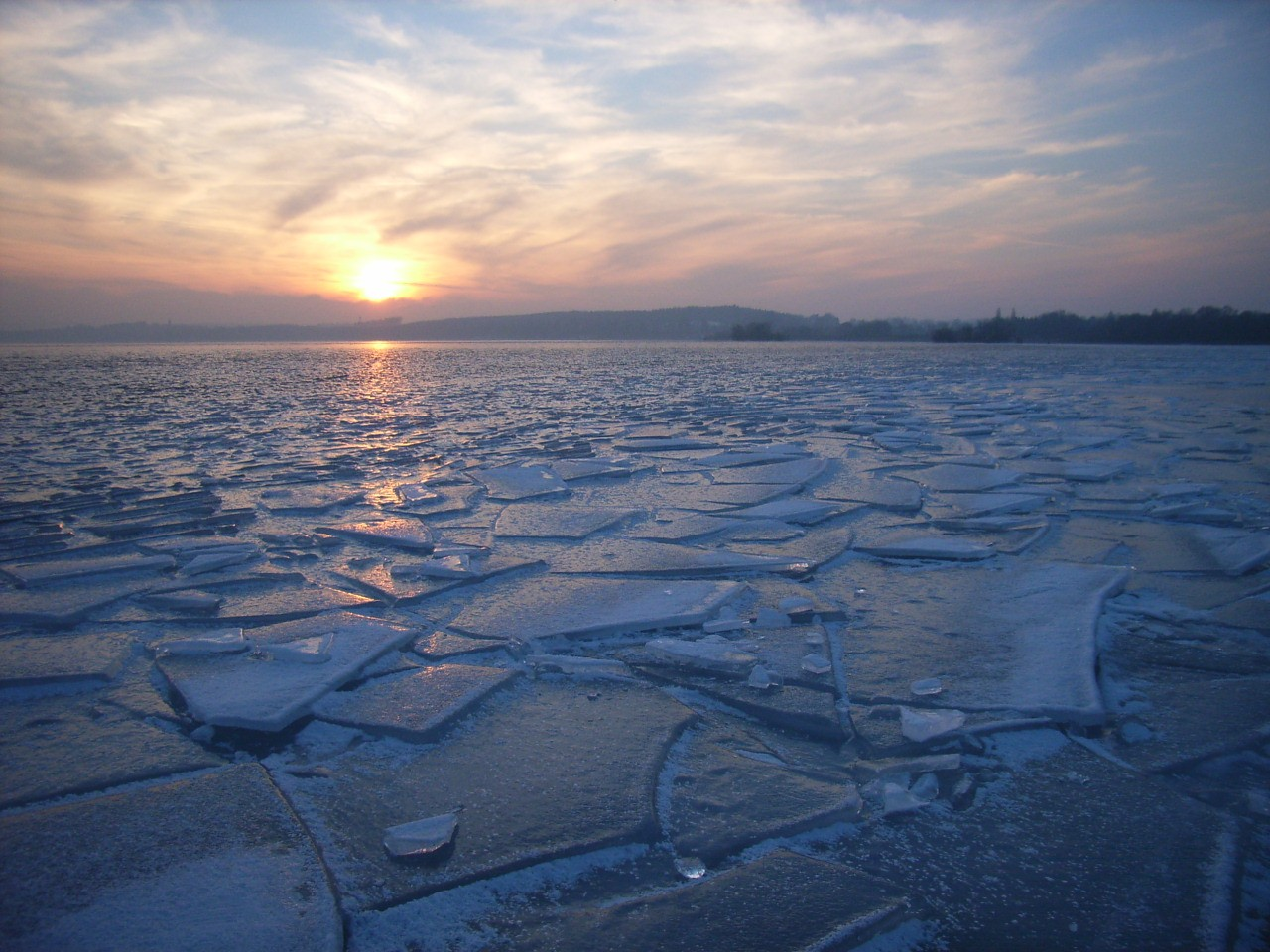
Ice on the Ammersee (2006)
