= Salvelinus maxillaris =

Conservation status
- Data Deficient (IUCN 3.1)

Scientific classification
- Domain: Eukaryota
- Kingdom: Animalia
- Phylum: Chordata
- Class: Actinopterygii
- Order: Salmoniformes
- Family: Salmonidae
- Genus: Salvelinus
- Species: S. maxillaris

Binomial name
- Salvelinus maxillaris Regan, 1909

Species of fish

Salvelinus maxillaris is a cold-water fish in the family Salmonidae which is endemic to Scotland. Locales in which it inhabits include The Minch, Loch Merkland, Loch Clair, Loch Coulin, Loch Maree, Loch Langavat, and the Isle of Lewis.
