= Fauna of Iceland =

Native animals of Iceland

The fauna of Iceland are the animal life which resides on the island of Iceland and its coasts, located in the north Atlantic Ocean just south of the Arctic Circle. This fauna includes a number of birds, mammals, fish, and invertebrates. The Arctic fox is the only land mammal native to Iceland, although a number of other mammals have been introduced following the human settlement of Iceland.

== Overview ==
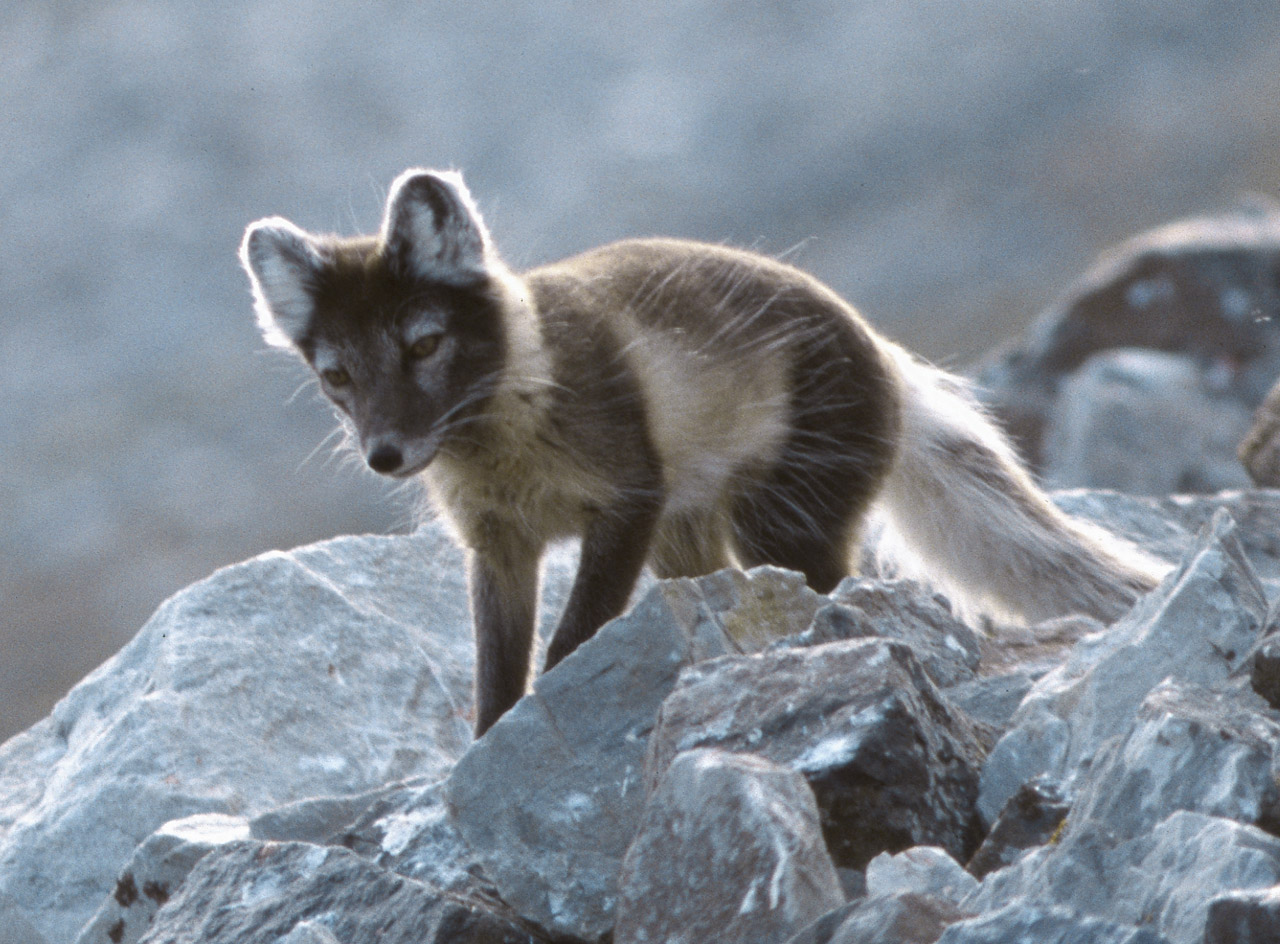
Arctic fox in summer coat

The only native land mammal on Iceland is the Arctic fox. Walruses were native to Iceland, but disappeared after human settlement, likely as a result of hunting, climate change and/or volcanism. Polar bears have been known to occasionally visit the island, mostly drifting there from Greenland. However, sightings of polar bears are rare, and those that are seen are usually killed for reasons of public safety.

Animals that have been introduced include the American mink, which escaped from fur farms and prospered, and the reindeer. A herd of reindeer in the southeast has died out but a larger herd in the northeast has a population of several thousand animals. The wood mouse has also been introduced and inhabits the countryside, with the house mouse, the brown rat and the black rat being restricted to urban areas. Bats have been increasingly recorded where they are thought to be either vagrants or artificially introduced.

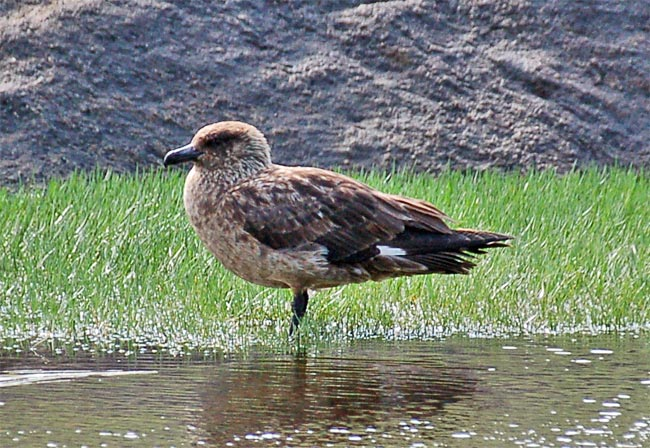
Great skua

About 72 species of bird breed on Iceland. These include the gyrfalcon, the white-tailed eagle, the merlin, the snowy owl and the short-eared owl. There are also ducks, geese, waders, gulls and other sea birds, the Arctic skua and the great skua, with the Icelandic population of the latter representing almost half of the total world population. There are few passerines (perching birds), perhaps because of a lack of nesting opportunities or a dearth of insect food at some times of year.

The rivers and lakes are home to Atlantic salmon, brown trout and Arctic char, as well as European eel and three-spined stickleback, and there are rainbow trout which have escaped from fish hatcheries. No species of reptiles or amphibians are known to live on Iceland.

Around 270 species of marine fish occur in the waters around Iceland, with the most important commercial species being cod, haddock, sea perch, plaice, herring, capelin and blue whiting. The harbour seal and the grey seal breed on beaches and several species of whale occur in the waters, as well as dolphins and harbour porpoises.

== Lists ==
- List of birds of Iceland
- List of Lepidoptera of Iceland
- List of mammals of Iceland
- List of freshwater fishes of Iceland

== See also ==
- Outline of Iceland
- Wildlife of Iceland
