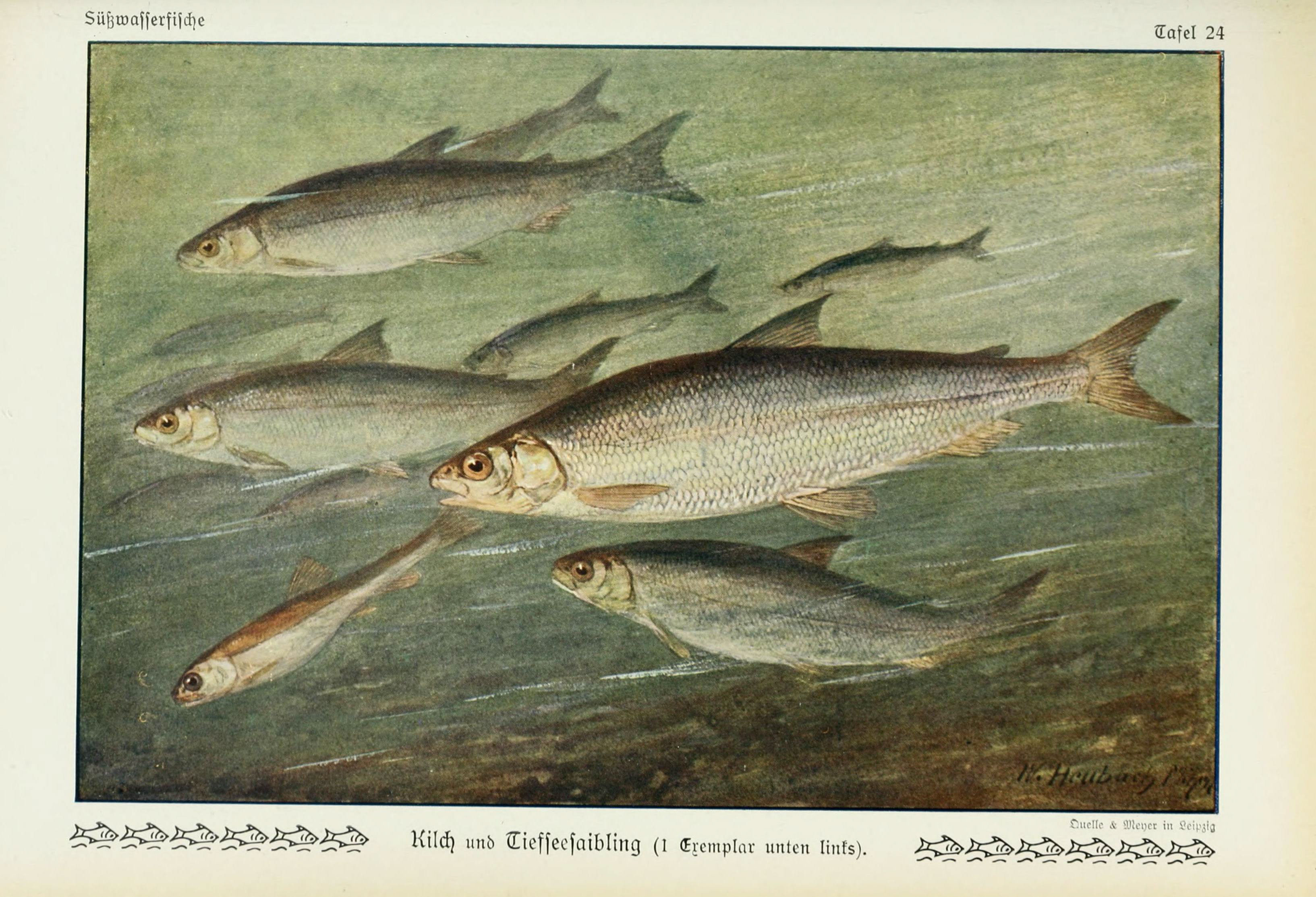
- Salvelinus profundus (tiefseesaibling) and Coregonus gutturosus (kilch)

Conservation status
- Endangered (IUCN 3.1)

Scientific classification
- Kingdom: Animalia
- Phylum: Chordata
- Class: Actinopterygii
- Order: Salmoniformes
- Family: Salmonidae
- Genus: Salvelinus
- Species: S. profundus

Binomial name
- Salvelinus profundus (Schillinger, 1901)

= Salvelinus profundus =

Species of fish

Salvelinus profundus (German: Tiefseesaibling 'Deepwater char') is a deepwater char species found only in deep areas of Lake Constance.

This fish can reach 24 cm (9.4 in) in length and has a blunt snout with the mouth in subinferior position. Its lower fins have no white margins and its flanks are silvery to yellowish with pale blue spots; the belly can have a reddish color.

== History ==
Salvelinus profundus was still a commercial species in the 1960s but the eutrophication of Lake Constance, which began in the 1950s and peaked in 1979, is thought to have affected egg development. Surveys undertaken in the last ten years failed to find any evidence of the survival of this deep-water trout, as well as of the Lake Constance whitefish (Coregonus gutturosus), another fish species driven recently to extinction. The species had been reported extinct since the late 1970s but was officially declared so by the IUCN only in 2008.

However, the fish species was rediscovered in 2016 during 'Project Lac', a marine survey undertaken by the Swiss Federal Institute of Aquatic Science and Technology. The team had not expected to locate the fish, which had not been seen in decades. It is suspected that they were not detected earlier due to the depth at which they swim.

The Lake Neuchâtel deepwater char (Salvelinus neocomensis) is a similar fish species that became extinct in another European lake.
