= Salvelinus evasus =

Conservation status
- Vulnerable (IUCN 3.1)

Scientific classification
- Kingdom: Animalia
- Phylum: Chordata
- Class: Actinopterygii
- Order: Salmoniformes
- Family: Salmonidae
- Genus: Salvelinus
- Species: S. evasus

Binomial name
- Salvelinus evasus (Freyhof & Kottelat, 2005)

Species of fish

Salvelinus evasus, is a vulnerable deepwater char or trout living in the Ammersee lake in Bavaria, Southern Germany.

This fish lives in the great depths of the lake, below 80 m. It can reach up to a foot in length, about 30 cm. Salvelinus evasus has a blunt snout and the mouth in subinferior position. Its flanks are silvery to yellowish, often with paler spots. Unlike other deepwater char species its lower fins have white margins.

Deepwater char are highly sensitive to changes in the quality of the water and the similar Salvelinus neocomensis was driven to extinction by eutrophication in other European lakes.
