= List of freshwater fishes of Iceland =

This is a list of freshwater fish found in Iceland.

Order	Family	Species	Native?	Icelandic common name	English common name	Image
Anguilliformes	Anguillidae	Anguilla anguilla	Yes	Áll	European eel	
Gasterosteiformes	Gasterosteidae	Gasterosteus aculeatus	Yes	Hornsíli	Three-spined stickleback	
Gasterosteiformes	Gasterosteidae	Gasterosteus islandicus	Yes	Iceland stickleback	Iceland stickleback	NA
Mugiliformes	Mugilidae	Chelon labrosus	Yes	Gráröndungur	Thicklip grey mullet	
Petromyzontiformes	Petromyzontidae	Petromyzon marinus	Yes	Sæsteinsuga	Sea lamprey	
Salmoniformes	Salmonidae	Oncorhynchus gorbuscha	No - introduced	Hnúðlax	Pink salmon	
Salmoniformes	Salmonidae	Salmo salar	Yes	Lax	Atlantic salmon	
Salmoniformes	Salmonidae	Salmo trutta	Yes	Urriði	Sea trout	
Salmoniformes	Salmonidae	Salvelinus alpinus	Yes	Bleikja	Arctic char	
Salmoniformes	Salmonidae	Salvelinus murta	Endemic	Murta	Char	NA
Salmoniformes	Salmonidae	Salvelinus thingvallensis	Endemic	Gjámurta	Char	NA
