= Salvelinus albus =

Scientific classification
- Kingdom: Animalia
- Phylum: Chordata
- Class: Actinopterygii
- Order: Salmoniformes
- Family: Salmonidae
- Genus: Salvelinus
- Species: S. albus

Binomial name
- Salvelinus albus Glubokovsky, 1977

Species of fish

Salvelinus albus, also known as white char, is a species of freshwater fish in the salmonidae family. It is endemic to the Kamchatka Peninsula, Russia, including the Lake Kronotskoye drainage basin.

== Description ==
The species is found to depths of 50 m (164 feet) under water, and is occasionally observed in the shallow offshore zone. The species are anadromous, as they will migrate up rivers from the sea for spawning.
