= Salvelinus perisii =

Conservation status
- Vulnerable (IUCN 3.1)

Scientific classification
- Kingdom: Animalia
- Phylum: Chordata
- Class: Actinopterygii
- Division: Teleostei
- Order: Salmoniformes
- Family: Salmonidae
- Genus: Salvelinus
- Species: S. perisii

Binomial name
- Salvelinus perisii Günther, 1865

Species of fish

Salvelinus perisii, also known as Torgoch charr, is a freshwater species of fish of the genus Salvelinus found in several lakes such as Llyn Peris, Llyn Padarn and Llyn Cwellyn in Gwynedd County of Wales. The species are listed as vulnerable by IUCN.

== Description ==
Torgoch charr can reach a recorded maximum length of 25 cm (9.8 inches). The species are benthopelagic, residing in the bottom or near bottom of the lake.
