= Salvelinus kuznetzovi =

Scientific classification
- Kingdom: Animalia
- Phylum: Chordata
- Class: Actinopterygii
- Order: Salmoniformes
- Family: Salmonidae
- Genus: Salvelinus
- Species: S. kuznetzovi

Binomial name
- Salvelinus kuznetzovi Taranetz, 1933

Synonyms
- Salvelinus malma kuznetzovi (Taranetz, 1933)

Species of fish

Salvelinus kuznetzovi, commonly known as stone char, is a species of freshwater fish in the salmon family. It is found in the Kamchatka Peninsula in the Russian Far East. Named after Russian fisheries biologist and fish breeder Ivan Ivanovich Kuznetsov (1885–1962).

== Description ==
The fish lives near or in the bottom of the water body. Little is known about their biology or habit. The fish usually has an overall brown colour, with brownish-red spots on both sides of the body.
