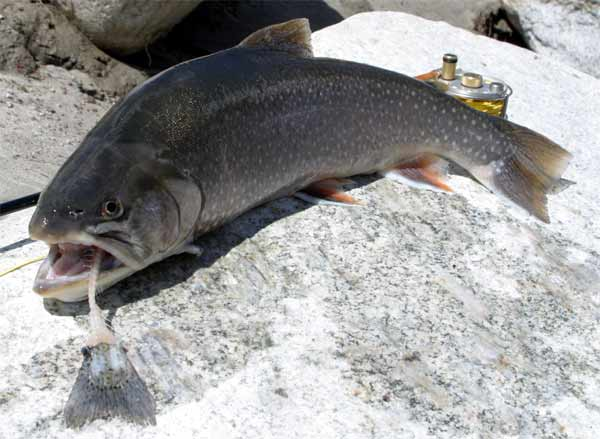

Scientific classification
- Kingdom: Animalia
- Phylum: Chordata
- Class: Actinopterygii
- Division: Teleostei
- Order: Salmoniformes
- Family: Salmonidae
- Genus: Salvelinus
- Species: S. alpinus
- Subspecies: S. a. erythrinus

Trinomial name
- Salvelinus alpinus erythrinus Georgi, 1775

= Salvelinus alpinus erythrinus =

Species of fish

Salvelinus alpinus erythrinus, also known as Baikal charr or davatchan, is a subspecies of freshwater fish in the salmon family. It is endemic to the mountains north of Lake Baikal in the Russian Far East. The fish is edible and it is reported that the population of the species shrunk rapidly over the recent years due to over-fishing.

== Description ==
The Baikal charr is benthopelagic, residing at or near the bottom of the lake. The fish can grow to a recorded maximum length of 70 cm (27.5 inches) and up to 4 kg (8.8 lbs).The fish usually feed on microscopic plankton.

The Baikal charr usually have a dark brown body, with yellow spots on both sides of the body.
