= Salvelinus vasiljevae =

Scientific classification
- Domain: Eukaryota
- Kingdom: Animalia
- Phylum: Chordata
- Class: Actinopterygii
- Order: Salmoniformes
- Family: Salmonidae
- Genus: Salvelinus
- Species: S. vasiljevae

Binomial name
- Salvelinus vasiljevae Safronov & Zvezdov, 2005

Species of fish

Salvelinus vasiljevae, commonly known as Sakhalinian char, is a species of freshwater fish in the salmon family. It is found in the wider Sakhalin region from Nevelskoy Strait and the Amur river basin.

== Description ==
Sakhalinian char can reach a recorded maximum length of 25.0 cm (9.8 inches). The fish is semi-anadromous, migrating up river to spawn in the middle of summer and autumn. The fish are omnivorous, feeding on fish, aerial and aquatic insects and their larvae, amphipods, on insectivorous mammals and mice. The species usually reside in rapid current and sandy or pebbled bottom in holes (up to 1.5-2 meters).
