= Salvelinus lonsdalii =

Conservation status
- Vulnerable (IUCN 3.1)

Scientific classification
- Kingdom: Animalia
- Phylum: Chordata
- Class: Actinopterygii
- Order: Salmoniformes
- Family: Salmonidae
- Genus: Salvelinus
- Species: S. lonsdalii

Binomial name
- Salvelinus lonsdalii Regan, 1909

Species of fish

Salvelinus lonsdalii, also known as Haweswater char or Lonsdale char, is a species of freshwater fish in the salmon family. It is endemic to the Haweswater Reservoir in England and was listed as critically endangered by IUCN in 2008, though this was revised to Vulnerable in 2023.

== Description ==
Haweswater char can reach a recorded maximum length of 15 cm (5.9 in). The species are benthopelagic, residing in the bottom or near bottom of the lake. Their flanks are bluish-brown with several orange spots.
