= Salvelinus struanensis =

Conservation status
- Vulnerable (IUCN 3.1)

Scientific classification
- Kingdom: Animalia
- Phylum: Chordata
- Class: Actinopterygii
- Order: Salmoniformes
- Family: Salmonidae
- Genus: Salvelinus
- Species: S. struanensis

Binomial name
- Salvelinus struanensis Maitland, 1881

Species of fish

Salvelinus struanensis, commonly known as Scottish char, is a species of freshwater fish in the salmon family. It is found in the Loch Rannoch and Loch Ericht in Scotland, United Kingdom.

== Description ==
The maximum recorded length of the fish can reach 36 cm (14.2 in), and a maximum recorded age of 8 years. The fish has an overall claret color in breeding season with dark fins and orange-pink spots. The fish does not have parr marks and body fusiform as compared to congeners in central Scotland.

== Biology ==
The species is found in the pelagic zone of fjord-like lakes, usually less than 20 m (70 ft) below surface. It feeds on zooplankton, especially Cladocera and Daphnia.
