= Salvelinus czerskii =

Scientific classification
- Kingdom: Animalia
- Phylum: Chordata
- Class: Actinopterygii
- Order: Salmoniformes
- Family: Salmonidae
- Genus: Salvelinus
- Species: S. czerskii

Binomial name
- Salvelinus czerskii Dryagin, 1932

Species of fish

Salvelinus czerskii, also known as Cherskii's char, is a freshwater species of fish of the genus salvelinus found in the Indigirka and Chukochya river basins in Arctic Russia.

== Description ==
The Cherskii's char can grow to a recorded maximum length of 75 cm (29.5 inches). The species is benthopelagic, residing at or near the bottom of the river. The species breed between August and September, laying eggs on muddy ground and shallow shores.

The fish has low caudal stalk and strongly notched caudal fin. There are few light or pinkish spots on both sides mainly located along the lateral line. During the breeding season, the spots on the sides turn red, and the throat and lower jaw turn yellow. The paired and anal fins are bright red, and their outer rays are white.
