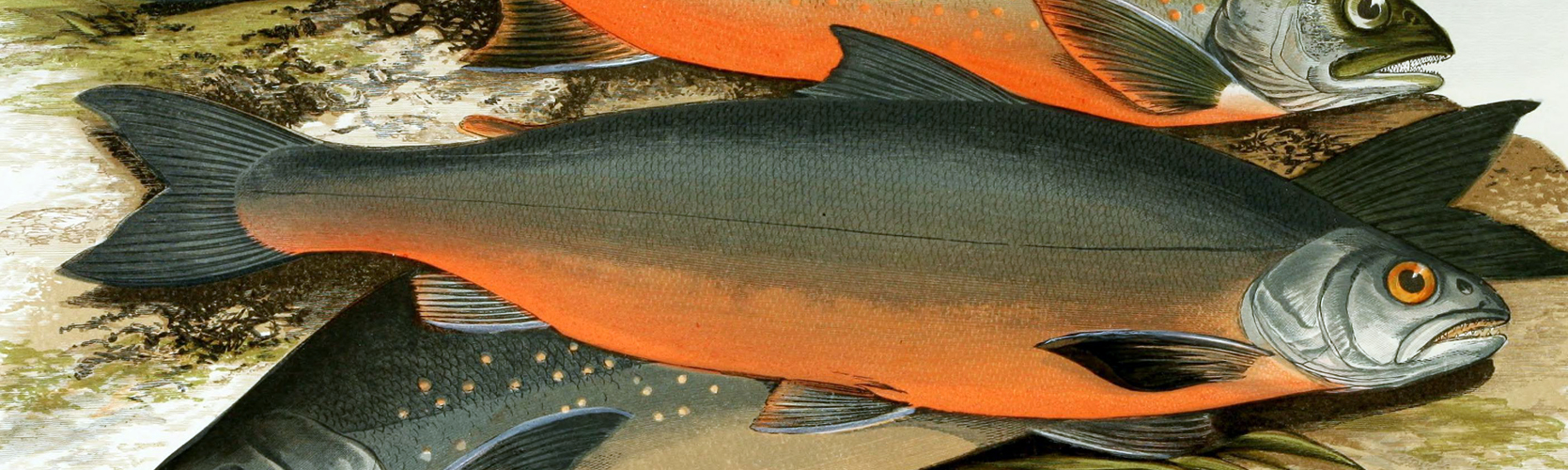

Conservation status
- Near Threatened (IUCN 3.1)

Scientific classification
- Kingdom: Animalia
- Phylum: Chordata
- Class: Actinopterygii
- Division: Teleostei
- Order: Salmoniformes
- Family: Salmonidae
- Genus: Salvelinus
- Species: S. colii

Binomial name
- Salvelinus colii (Günther, 1863)

Synonyms
- previous scientific names: Salvelinus scharffi Regan, 1911 Salvelinus trevelyani Regan 1908, 1911

= Salvelinus colii =

Cole's char

Species of fish

Salvelinus colii, also called Cole's char, Enniskillen char or Trevelyan's char, is a cold-water species of char fish in the family Salmonidae.

Salvelinus colii is currently located in Ireland, in several lakes draining westward, in County Clare, County Kerry, County Galway, County Mayo, County Donegal and County Westmeath. Lough Ennell and Lough Conn are major sites.

== Taxonomy ==
=== Name ===
The English word "char[r]" is thought to derive from Old Irish ceara/cera meaning "[blood] red," referring to its pink-red underside. This would also connect with its Welsh name torgoch, "red belly."

== Biology ==
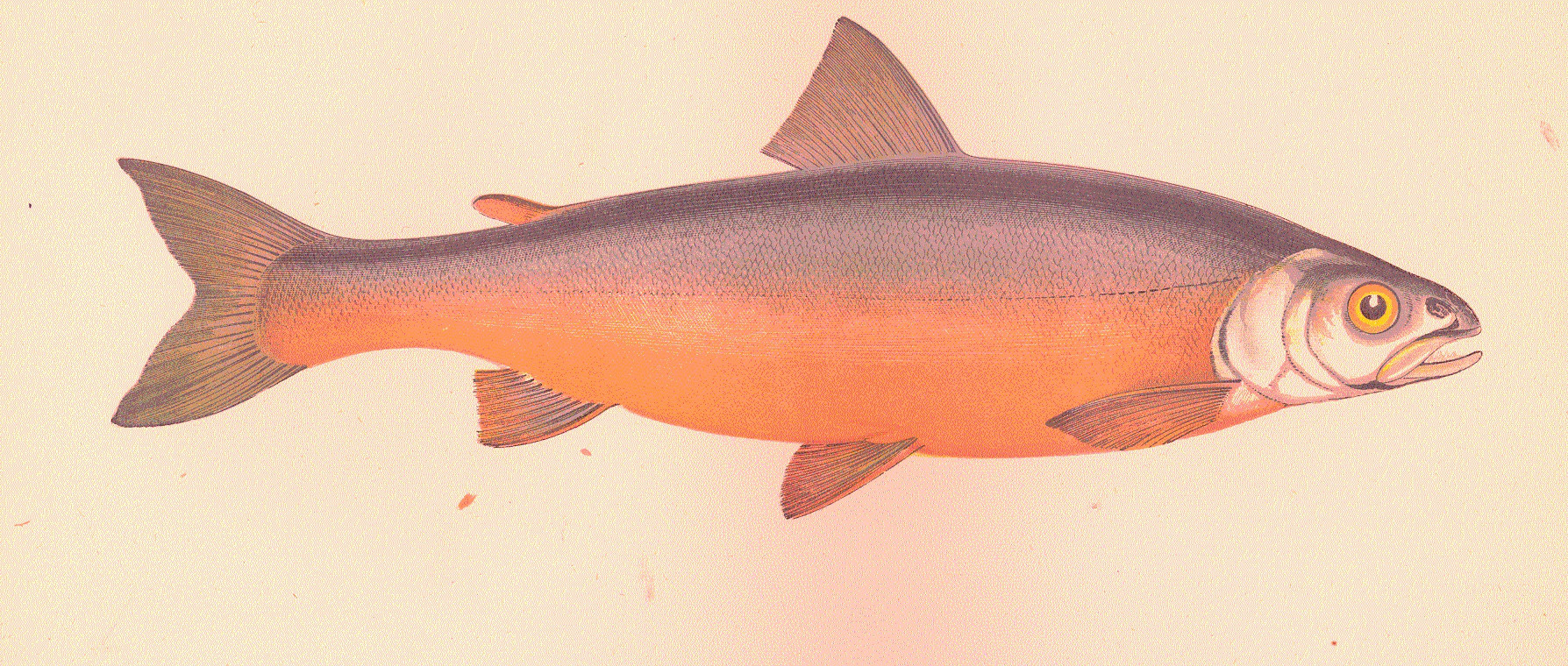
Drawing of Salvelinus colii, 1877

Salvelinus colii spawns in November/December. Feeds on benthic and planktonic invertebrates.
