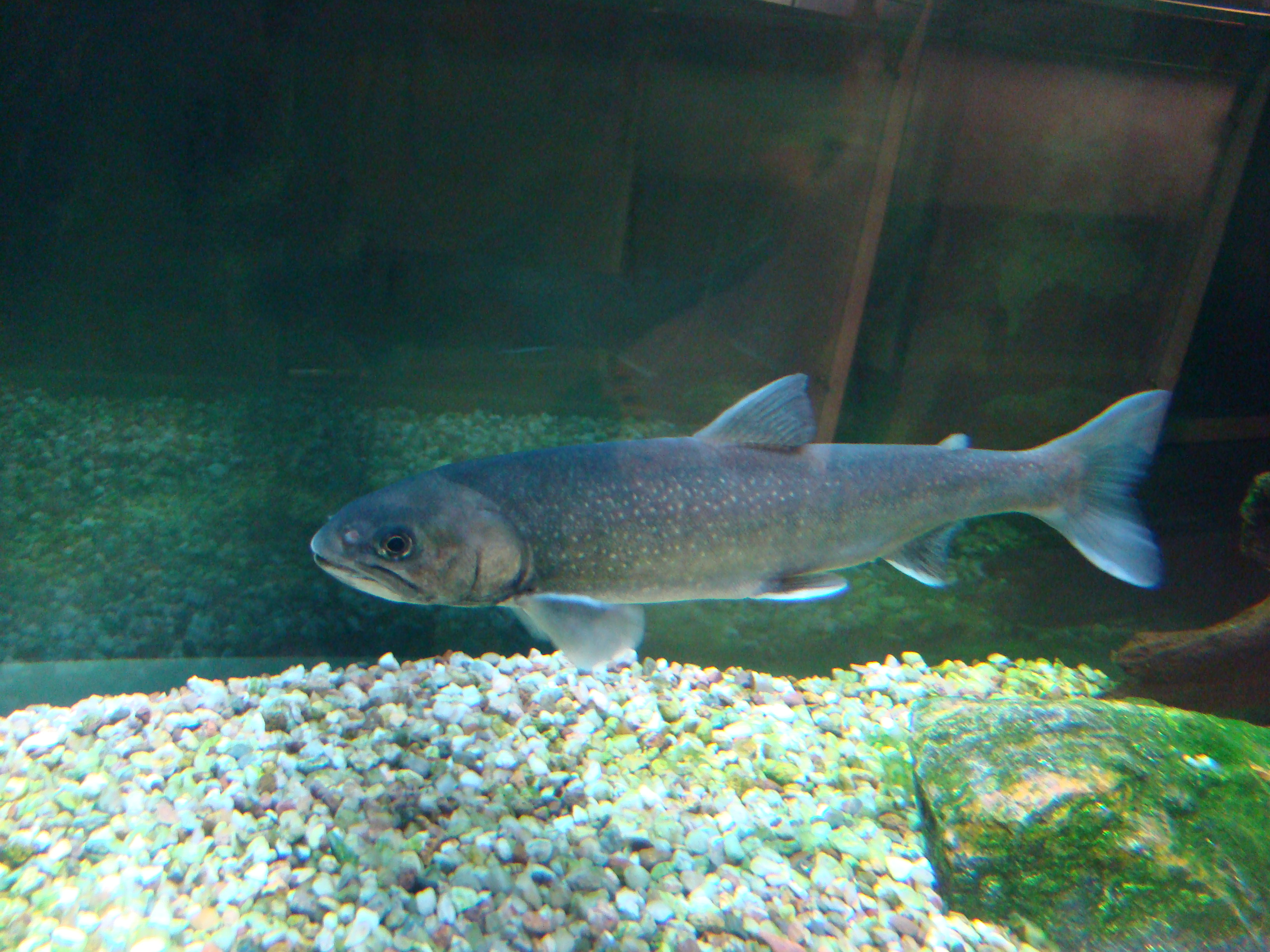
- Arctic char, Salvelinus alpinus alpinus

Scientific classification
- Kingdom: Animalia
- Phylum: Chordata
- Class: Actinopterygii
- Division: Teleostei
- Order: Salmoniformes
- Family: Salmonidae
- Subfamily: Salmoninae
- Genus: Salvelinus; J. Richardson, 1836

Type species
- Salmo alpinus (Linnaeus, 1758)

Subgenera
- Baione DeKay, 1842; Cristovomer Walbaum, 1792; Salvelinus J. Richardson, 1836

= Salvelinus =

Salvelinus Temporal range: Late Miocene - present

Genus of fishes

Salvelinus is a genus of salmonid fish often called char or charr; some species are called "trout". Salvelinus is a member of the subfamily Salmoninae within the family Salmonidae. The genus has a northern circumpolar distribution, and most of its members are typically cold-water fish that primarily inhabit fresh waters. Many species also migrate to the sea.

Most char may be identified by light-cream, pink, or red spots over a darker body. Scales tend to be small, with 115–200 along the lateral line. The pectoral, pelvic, anal, and the lower aspect of caudal fins are trimmed in snow white or cream leading edges.

Many members of this genus are popular sport fish, and a few, such as lake trout (S. namaycush) and arctic char (S. alpinus) are objects of commercial fisheries and/or aquaculture. Occasionally such fish escape and become invasive species.

Deepwater char are small species of char living below 80 m in the deep areas of certain lakes. They are highly sensitive to changes in the quality of the water and one species, Salvelinus neocomensis, was driven to extinction in the twentieth century.

== Etymology ==
The origin of the name "char" or "charr" is unknown, but was perhaps from Celtic, such as the Irish word ceara meaning "fiery red" (found in some Celtic personal names), likely for the bright red belly of the Arctic char; or perhaps borrowed from Middle Low German schar meaning "flounder, dab"; or from Proto-Germanic *skardaz or *skeraną meaning "to cut or shear", possibly referring to its sherd-like shape.

== Taxonomy ==
There are currently three subgenera in the genus Salvelinus: Baione, Cristovomer, and Salvelinus sensu stricto. Baione, the most basal clade in the genus, contains the brook trout (S. fontinalis), and the presumably extinct silver trout (S. agassizii). Cristovomer contains only the lake trout (S. namaycush). All other species are in the subgenus Salvelinus. If the long-finned char (Salvethymus svetovidovi) is considered a member of the genus Salvelinus, it would be classified in the subgenus Salvethymus, adding a fourth subgenus.

== Species diversity ==
Video of young Arctic charr being released into Llyn Padarn, Wales in 2020.

As with other salmonid genera, the delimitation of species in Salvelinus is controversial. FishBase in 2015 listed 54 species or subspecies in this genus, many of which have very narrow local distributions. Fourteen localised species are listed from the British Isles alone, although these traditionally, and still by the national conservation and fisheries authorities, are all considered to represent the widespread Arctic charr (S. alpinus). Twenty species are listed from the Asian part of Russia, including several localised taxa from in each of the Kamchatka, Chukotka and Taimyr peninsulas. One of these is the long-finned char, which phylogenetically is part of the Salvelinus group but has been so far classified into its own monotypic genus Salvethymus.

The Arctic char (S. alpinus) is the most broadly distributed Salvelinus species. It has a circumpolar distribution, and it is considered the most northern of all freshwater fishes. In North America, five relatively well defined species are present, which, apart from the Arctic char, comprise the brook trout (S. fontinalis), bull trout (S. confluentus), Dolly Varden trout (S. malma) and lake trout (S. namaycush).

This listing presents the taxa recognised in FishBase grouped by geography:

=== Circumpolar ===
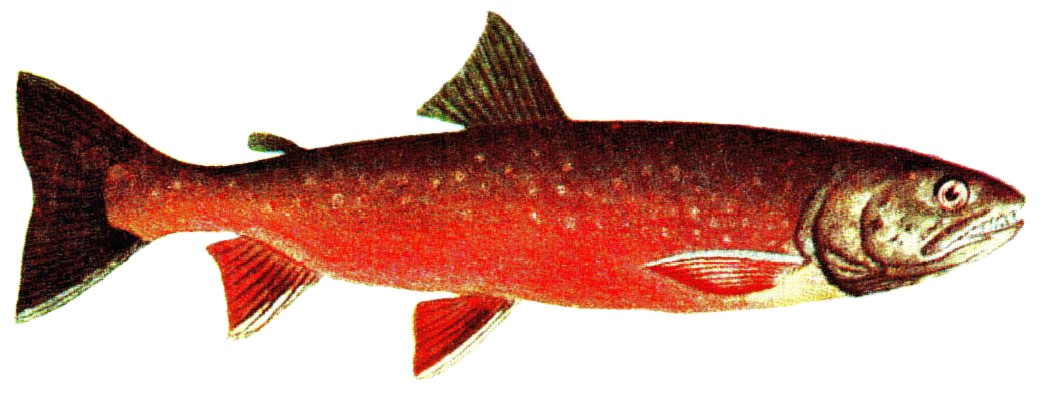
- Salvelinus alpinus (Linnaeus, 1758) – Arctic char

=== Europe ===
==== Central Europe ====
- Salvelinus evasus Freyhof & Kottelat, 2005
- †Salvelinus neocomensis Freyhof & Kottelat, 2005
- Salvelinus profundus (Schillinger, 1901)
- Salvelinus umbla (Linnaeus, 1758) – lake char

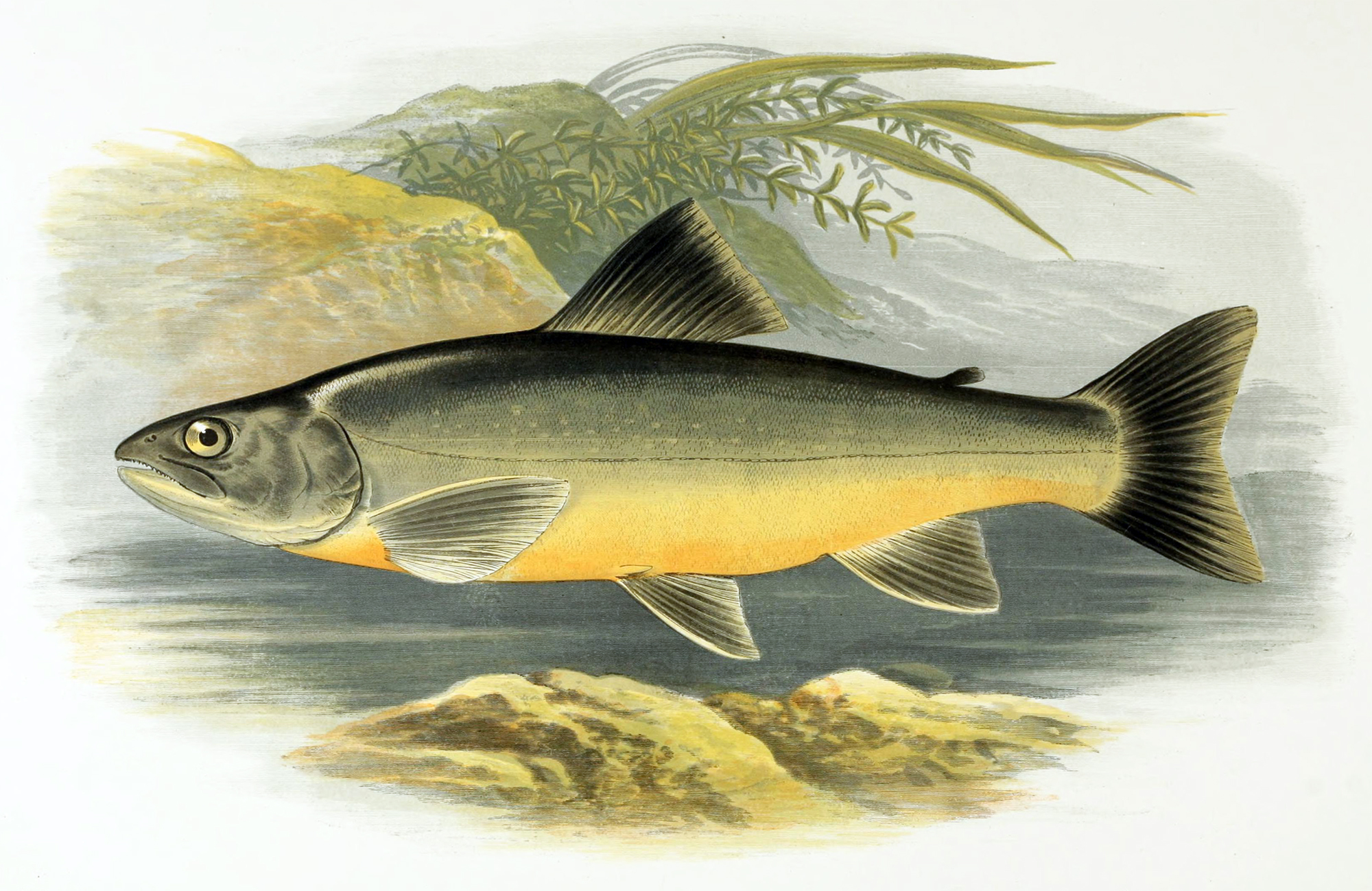
Salvelinus killinensis, Scotland

==== British Isles ====
Scotland and adjacent islands:

- Salvelinus gracillimus Regan, 1909
- †Salvelinus inframundus Regan, 1909
- Salvelinus killinensis (Günther, 1866)
- Salvelinus mallochi Regan, 1909
- Salvelinus maxillaris Regan, 1909
- Salvelinus struanensis (Maitland, 1881)
- Salvelinus youngeri (Friend, 1965) – golden char

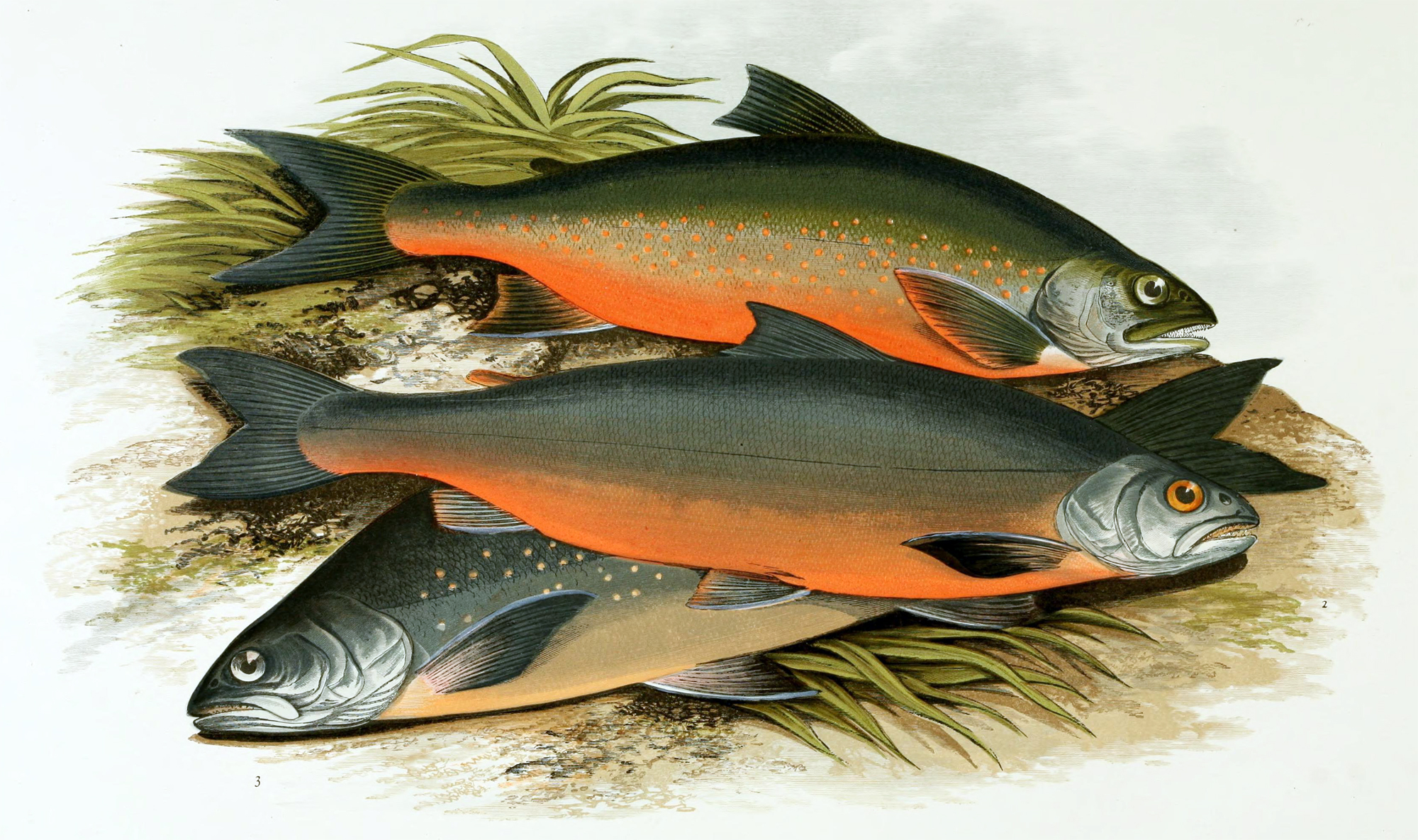
Salvelinus alpinus, Salvelinus colii and Salvelinus grayi, Irish taxa

England and Wales:

- Salvelinus lonsdalii Regan, 1909
- Salvelinus perisii (Günther, 1865)
- Salvelinus willughbii (Günther, 1862)

Ireland:

- Salvelinus colii (Günther, 1863) – Cole's char
- Salvelinus fimbriatus Regan, 1908 – Coomsaharn char
- Salvelinus grayi (Günther, 1862) – Gray's char
- Salvelinus obtusus Regan, 1908 – blunt-snouted Irish char

==== Northern Europe ====
Iceland and Atlantic islands:

- Salvelinus faroensis Joensen & Tåning, 1970
- Salvelinus murta (Sæmundsson, 1909)
- Salvelinus thingvallensis (Sæmundsson, 1909)
- Salvelinus salvelinoinsularis (Lönnberg, 1900) – Bear Island char

Fennoscandia and Northwest Russia:

- Salvelinus lepechini (J. F. Gmelin, 1789)

=== Asia ===
==== Arctic drainages ====
- Salvelinus andriashevi L. S. Berg, 1948 – Chukot char
- Salvelinus boganidae L. S. Berg, 1926 – Boganida char
- Salvelinus czerskii Dryagin, 1932 – Cherskii's char
- Salvelinus drjagini Logashev, 1940 – Dryagin's char
- Salvelinus elgyticus Viktorovsky & Glubokovsky, 1981 – small-mouth char

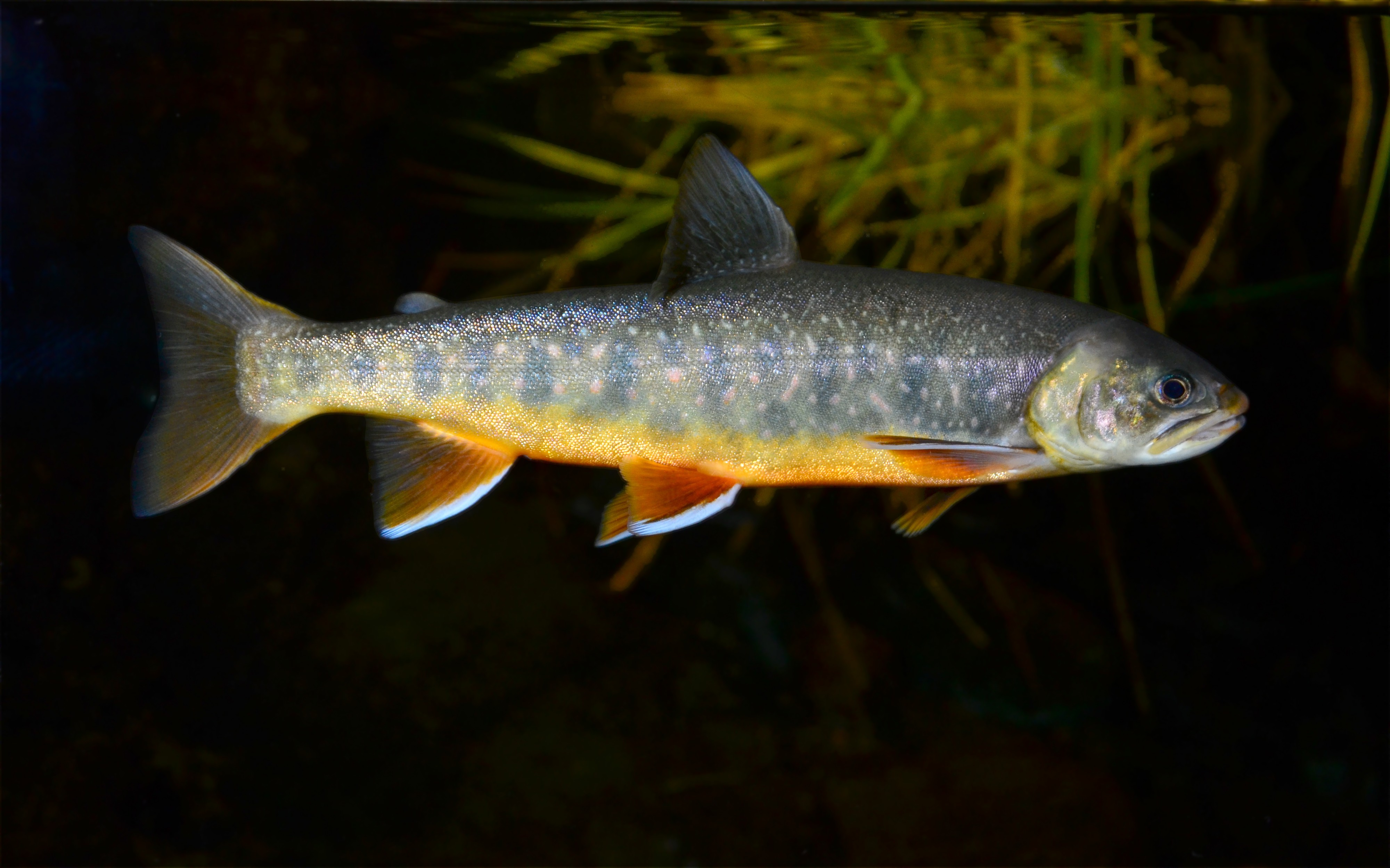
Whitespotted char, Salvelinus leucomaenis

- Salvelinus alpinus erythrinus (Georgi, 1775) – davatchan
- Salvelinus jacuticus Borisov, 1935 – Yakutian char
- Salvelinus taimyricus Mikhin, 1949
- Salvelinus taranetzi Kaganowsky, 1955 – Taranets char
- Salvelinus tolmachoffi L. S. Berg, 1926 – Lake Yessey char
- Salvethymus svetovidovi Chereshnev & Skopets, 1990 – long-finned char: phylogenetically part of the Salvelinus clade]

==== Pacific drainages ====
- Salvelinus albus Glubokovsky, 1977 – white char
- Salvelinus curilus (Pallas, 1814) (= S. malma krascheninnikova Taranetz, 1933 – southern Dolly Varden
- Salvelinus gritzenkoi Vasil'eva & Stygar, 2000

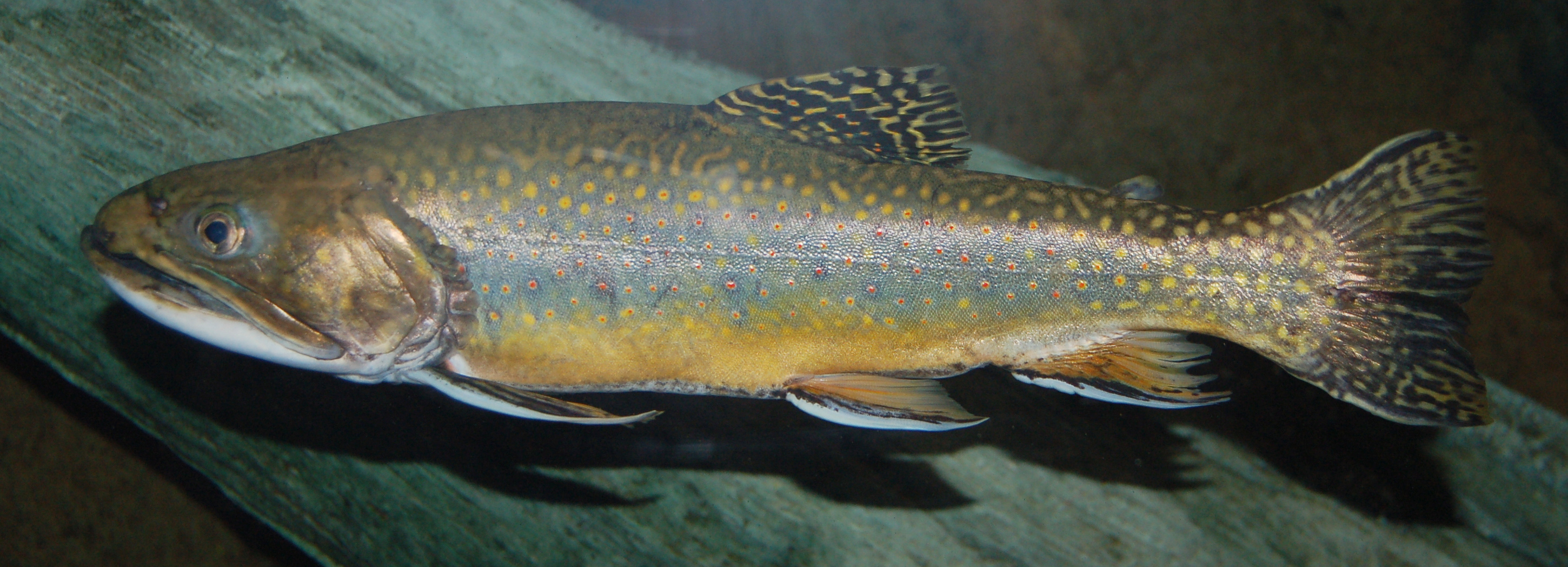
Brook trout, Salvelinus fontinalis

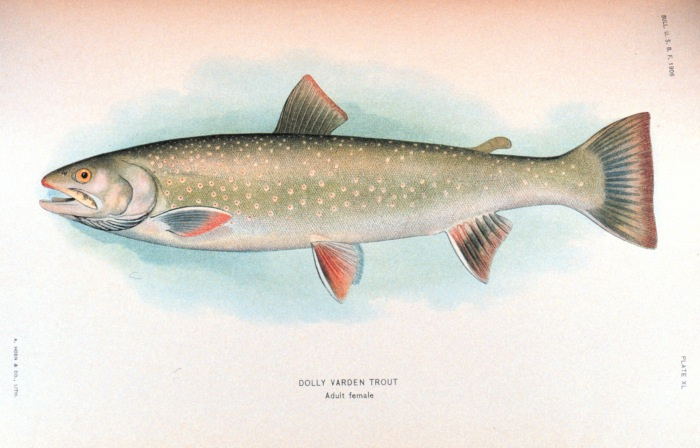
Dolly Varden trout, Salvelinus malma

- Salvelinus krogiusae Glubokovksy, Frolov, Efremov, Ribnikova & Katugin, 1993
- Salvelinus kronocius Viktorovsky, 1978
- Salvelinus kuznetzovi Taranetz, 1933
- Salvelinus leucomaenis (Pallas, 1814) – whitespotted char
  - S. l. leucomaenis (Pallas, 1814)
  - S. l. imbrius D. S. Jordan & E. A. McGregor, 1925
  - S. l. pluvius (Hilgendorf, 1876)
  - S. l. japonicus (=S. japonicus) Ōshima, 1961 – kirikuchi char
- Salvelinus neiva Taranetz, 1933 – Neiva
- Salvelinus schmidti Viktorovsky, 1978
- Salvelinus vasiljevae Safronov & Zvezdov, 2005 – Sakhalinian char

=== North America ===
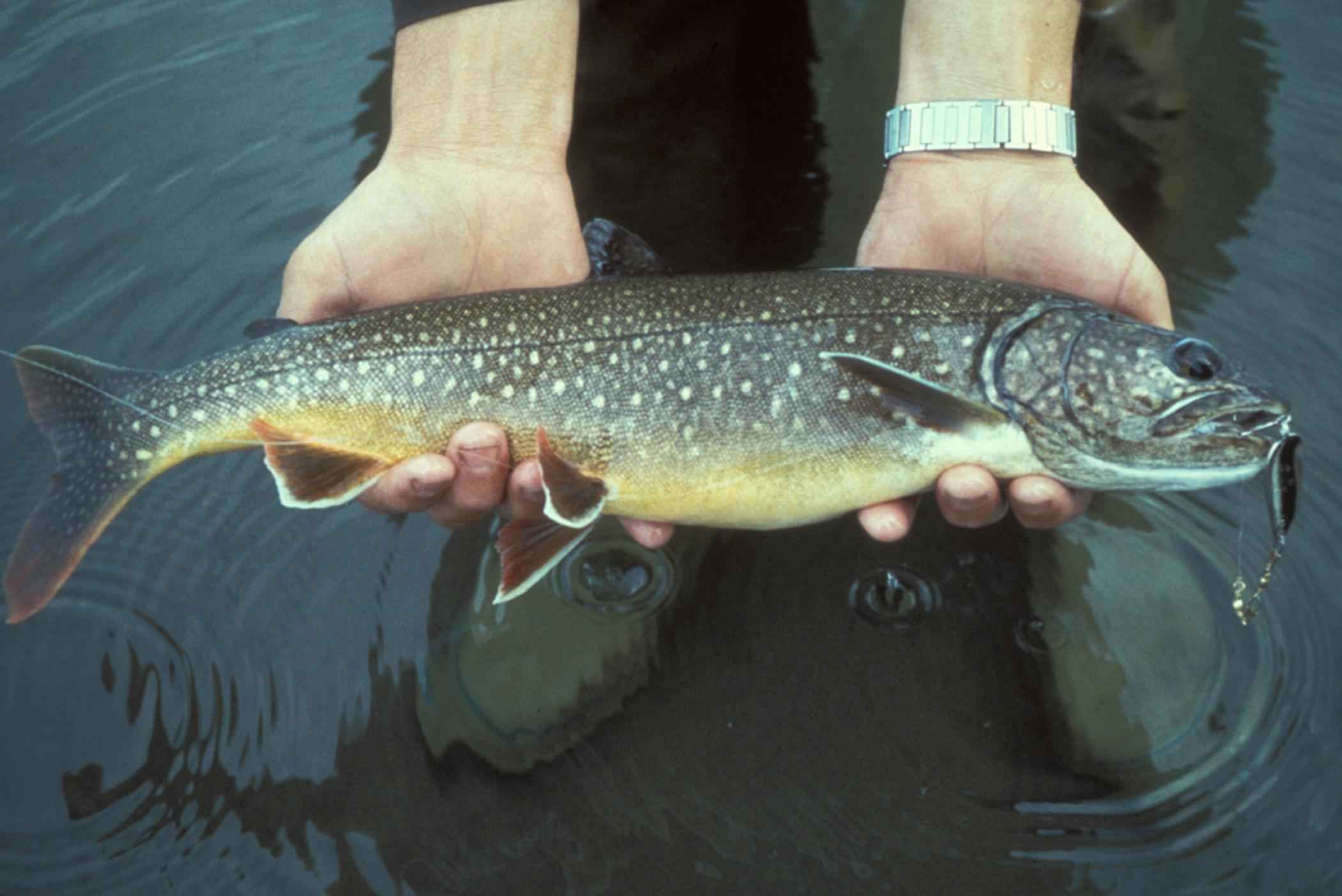
Lake trout, Salvelinus namaycush

==== Atlantic drainages ====
- †Salvelinus agassizii (Garman, 1885) – silver trout
- Salvelinus fontinalis (Mitchill, 1814) – brook trout
- Salvelinus namaycush (Walbaum, 1792) – lake trout

==== Pacific & Arctic drainages ====
- Salvelinus confluentus (Suckley, 1859) – bull trout
- Salvelinus malma (Walbaum, 1792) – Dolly Varden trout
  - "Salvelinus anaktuvukensis" Morrow, 1973 – angayukaksurak char (= S. malma)

=== Hybrids ===
- S. alpinus × S. fontinalis – Alsatian char
- S. namaycush × S. fontinalis – splake, brookinaw
- S. fontinalis × Salmo trutta – tiger trout
- S. leucomaensis x O. masou – river mackerel, Kawasaba
