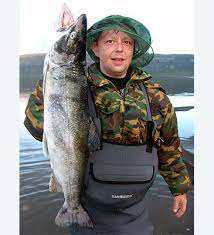
- Dryanin's charr caught by an angler

Scientific classification
- Kingdom: Animalia
- Phylum: Chordata
- Class: Actinopterygii
- Order: Salmoniformes
- Family: Salmonidae
- Genus: Salvelinus
- Species: S. drjagini

Binomial name
- Salvelinus drjagini Logashev, 1940

= Salvelinus drjagini =

Species of fish

Salvelinus drjagini, also known as Dryanin's charr, is a species of freshwater fish in the salmon family. It is found in the lakes and rivers of the Taimyr Peninsula in arctic Russia. The species is used to produce yellow coloured cavier.

== Description ==
Dryanin's charr can reach a recorded maximum length of 90.0 cm (35.4 inches) and up to 8.3 kg (18.3 lbs).

The body of Dryagin's charr is covered with a few large (about 1 cm) light orange spots of usually irregular shape. The belly and underside of the head are white or light yellow. The pelvic and anal fins are reddish-brown. During the spawning season, the body colour of the fish becomes brighter.
