= Salvelinus gracillimus =

Conservation status
- Vulnerable (IUCN 3.1)

Scientific classification
- Kingdom: Animalia
- Phylum: Chordata
- Class: Actinopterygii
- Order: Salmoniformes
- Family: Salmonidae
- Genus: Salvelinus
- Species: S. gracillimus

Binomial name
- Salvelinus gracillimus Regan, 1909

Synonyms
- Salvelinus alpinus (non Joensen & Tåning, 1970)

Species of fish

Salvelinus gracillimus is a cold-water species of fish in the family Salmonidae. It was first described by Charles Tate Regan in 1909.

The species is endemic to Loch of Girlsta in the Shetland Islands; reports of specimens from Loch More on the Scottish mainland are unconfirmed. Introduced fish species and farmed Arctic char constitute potential threats to the populations. The IUCN categorizes the species as vulnerable.
