= Loch Clair =

Freshwater loch in Scotland

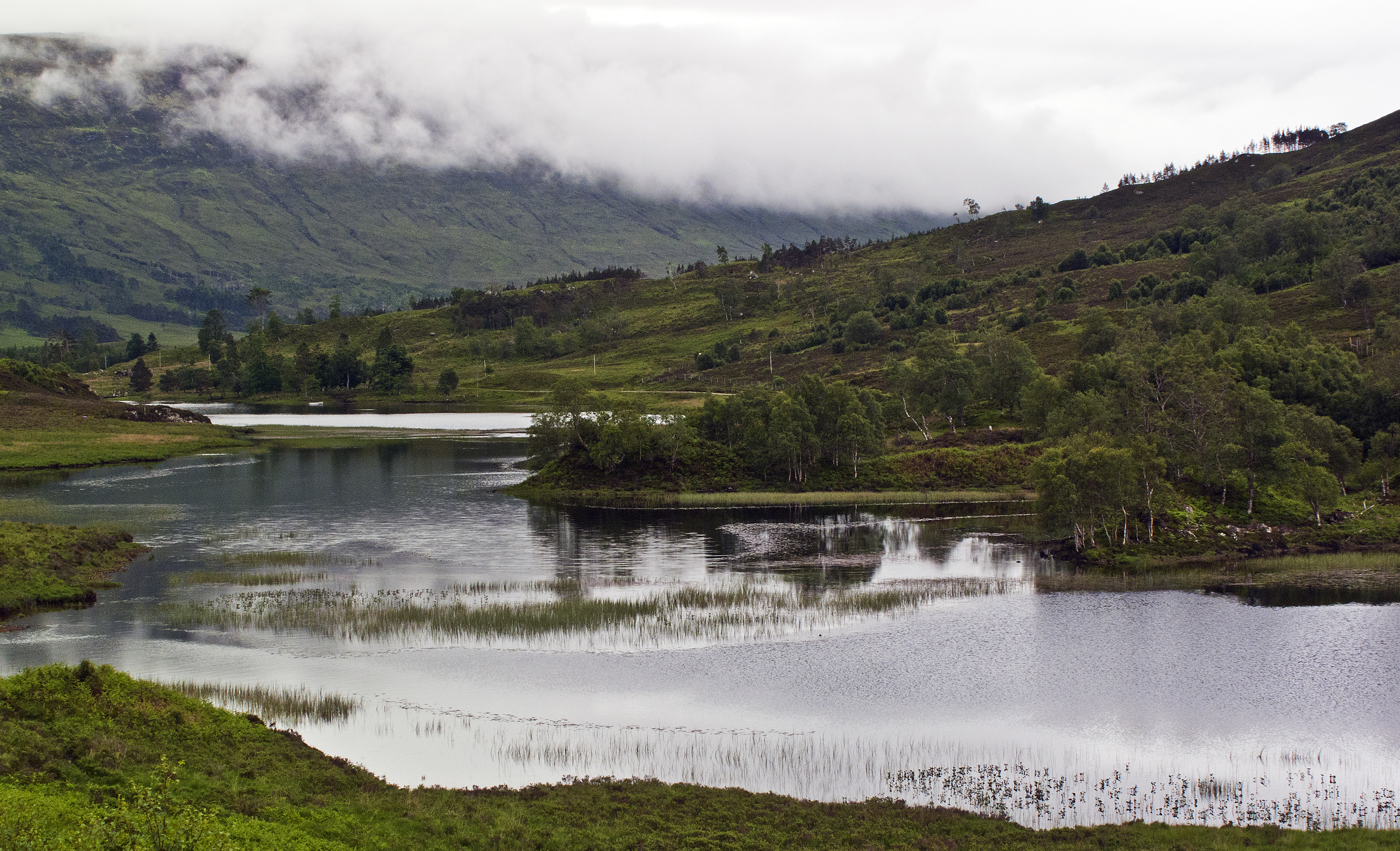
- Loch Clair for the southern end

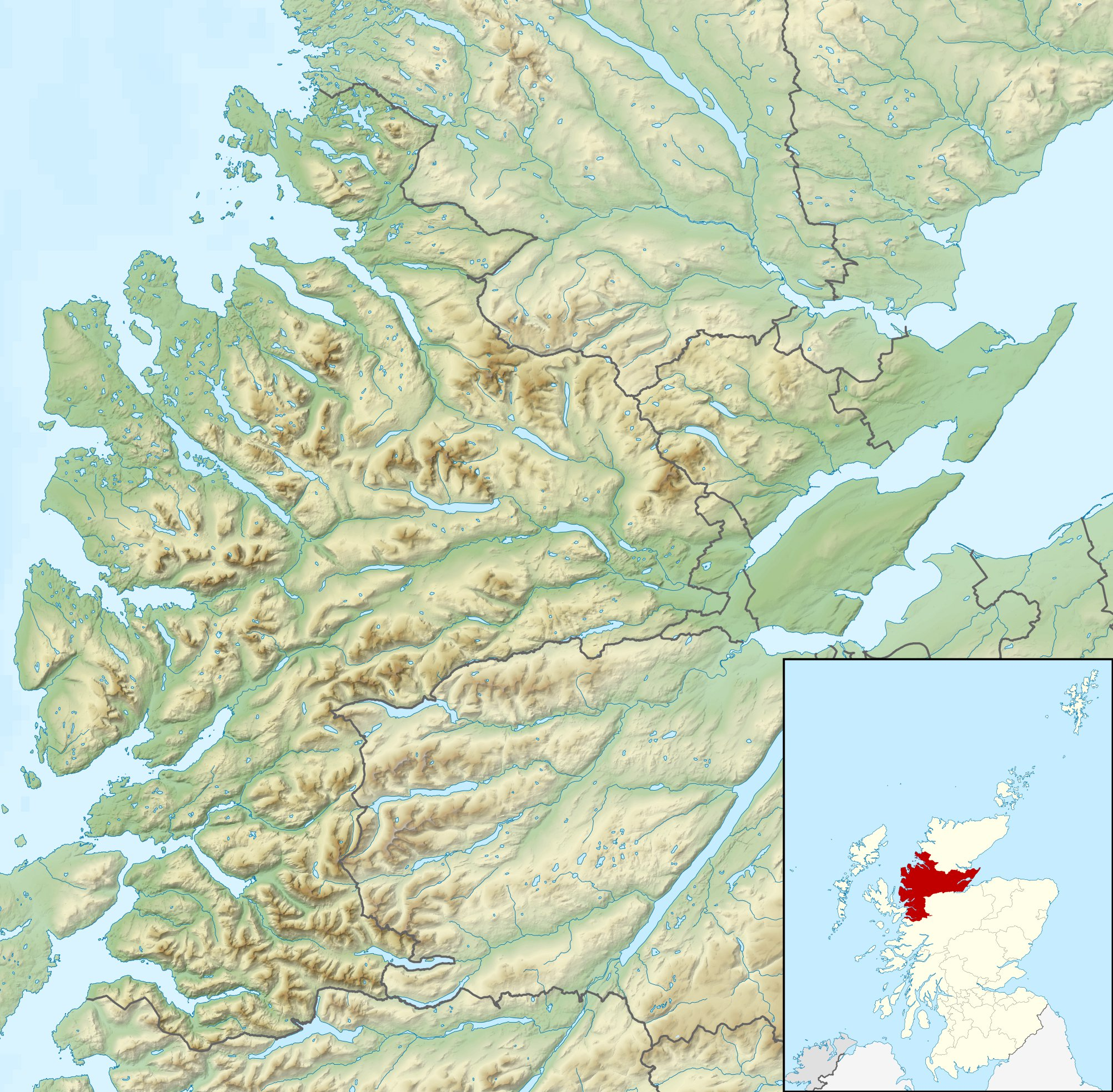
- Location in Wester Ross
- Location: NG99905723
- Coordinates: 57.561020°N 5.345385°W
- Type: freshwater loch
- Basin countries: Scotland
- Max. length: 0.55 km (0.34 mi)
- Max. width: 0.19 km (0.12 mi)
- Surface area: 63 ha (160 acres)
- Average depth: 41.9 ft (12.8 m)
- Max. depth: 92.8 ft (28.3 m)
- Water volume: 284,686,148.7 ft^{3} (8,061,414.00 m^{3})
- Shore length^{1}: 5 km (3.1 mi)
- Surface elevation: 94 m (308 ft)
- Max. temperature: 57 °F (14 °C)
- Min. temperature: 48 °F (9 °C) at 85 feet
- ^{1} Shore length is not a well-defined measure.

Loch Clair (Loch of the level place) is a small remote shallow low-altitude freshwater loch, located within the Coulin Forest, some three miles to the south-west of Kinlochewe in Wester Ross. Loch Clair is the lower of two lochs in the same valley and is aligned on a southeast-northwest bearing. The other loch is Loch Coulin which is fed by the River Coulin, the waters of which in turn flow out of Loch Coulin through a short unnamed river into Loch Clair. A small lochan, Loch Bharranch, is located a mile to the west and drains into the western end of Loch Clair through an unnamed burn.

Loch Clair is drained by another river, A' Ghairbhe, which flows in a roughly north-east direction to Kinlochewe, where it joins the Abhainn Bruachaig to form the Kinlochewe River.

Loch Clair can be reached by the A896 road, which runs from Kinlochewe to Torridon, Shieldaig and beyond.

== Geography ==
Loch Clair is bounded to the north by a mountain massif in the Torridon area that contains the highest peak of Beinn Eighe, which is within Beinn Eighe National Nature Reserve. The imposing peak of Liathach at 1024 metres is the most prominent peak that is visible from Loch Clair. To the west, the loch is bounded by a series of low hills, the highest two being Creag Dhubh at 384 metres and Sgùrr Dubh at 782 metres. To the east is open peatland in an area consisting of small hills, burns and peat bogs. To the south is a continuation of the mountainous Coulin Forest, with Meall and Leathaid Mhòir at an altitude of 512 metres.

== Fishing ==
Loch Clair is an excellent fishing location for trout that weigh 10 to 12 ounces. Ideal trout flies for the loch include Soldier Palmer, Greenwell's Glory and Silver Butcher.

== Walking ==
Loch Clair is the location of an almost level hiking route that follows the north coast of the loch, before making a circular walk around Loch Coulin and is about 9.64 km long.

== Gallery ==
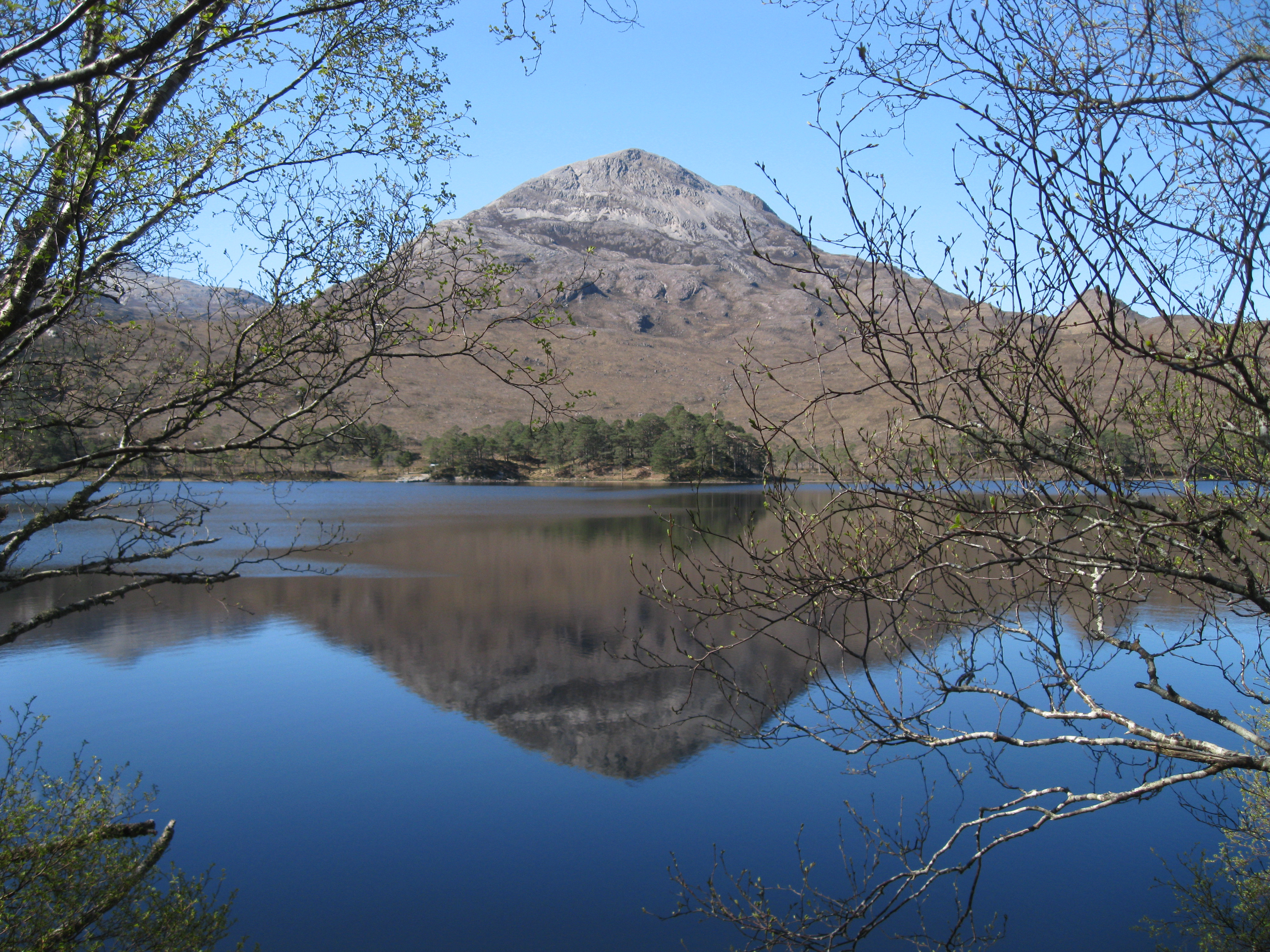
Loch Clair and Sgurr Dubh

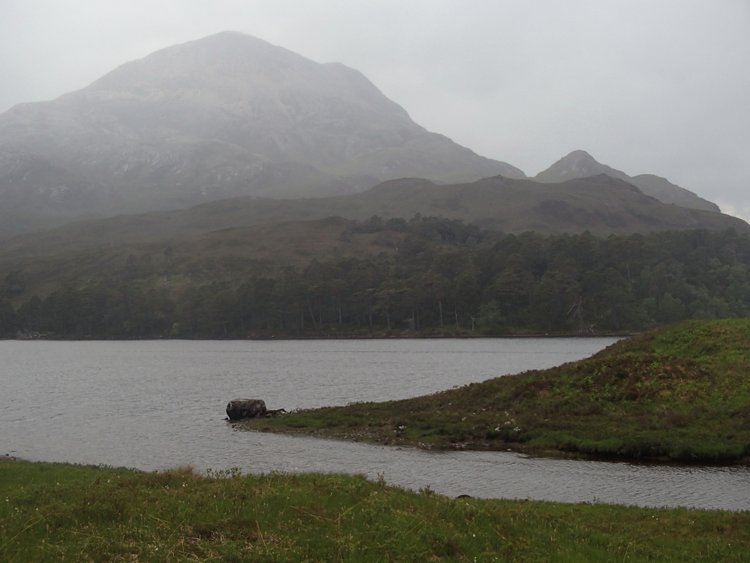
Another view of Loch Clair and Sgurr Dubh

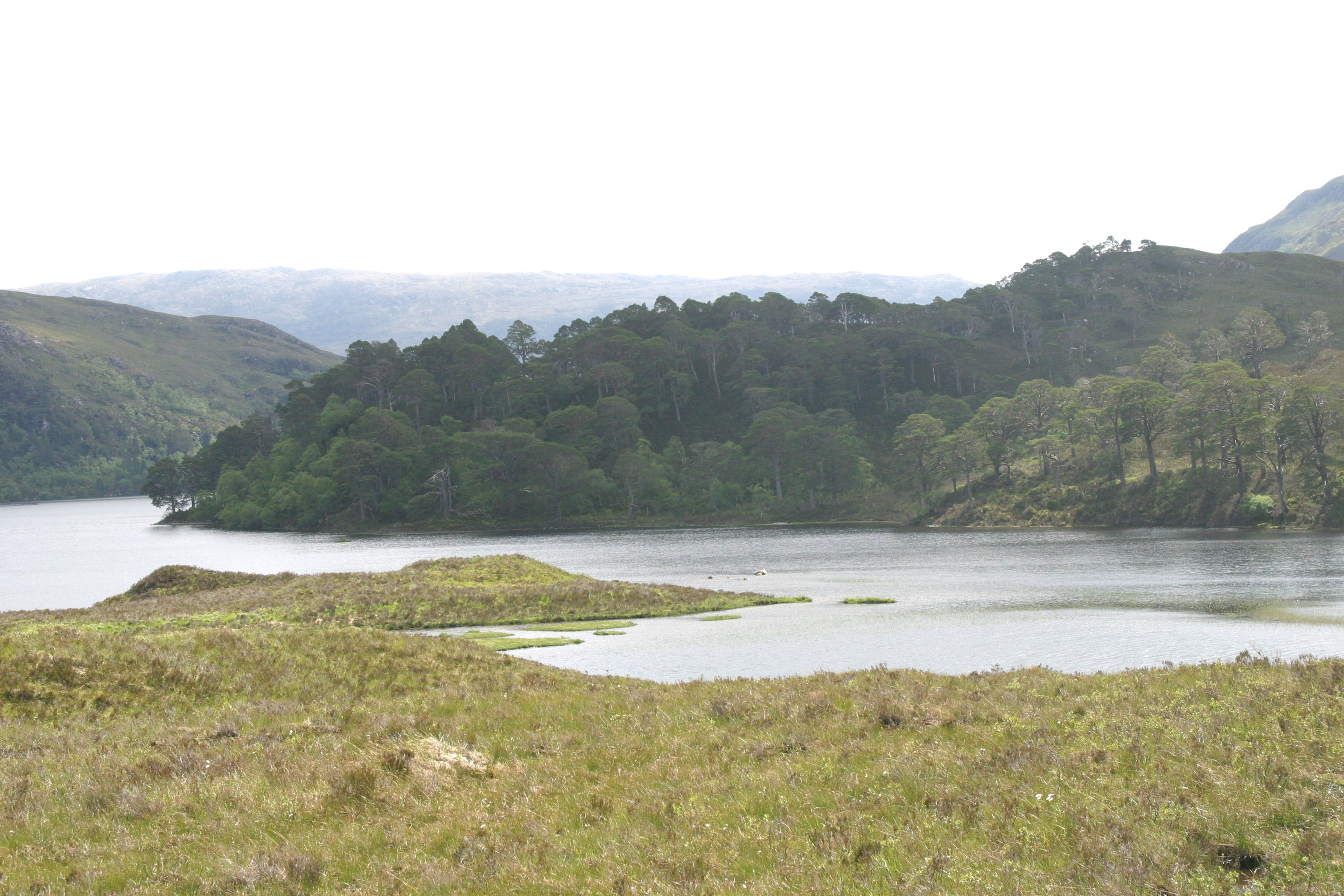
Loch Clair viewed from the north

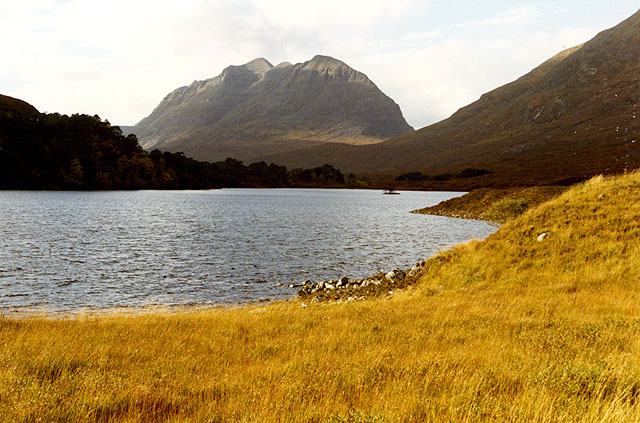
Loch Clair With Liathach forming the backdrop.
