= Wildlife of Iceland =

Topographic map of Iceland

The wildlife of Iceland is the wild plant and animal life found on the island of Iceland, located in the north Atlantic Ocean just south of the Arctic Circle. The flora, fauna, and funga is limited by the geography and climate of the island. The habitats on the island include high mountains, lava fields, tundras, rivers, lakes and a coastal plain of varying width. There is a long coastline, much dissected by fjords, especially in the west, north and east, with many offshore islets. The entire country is a single ecoregion, the Iceland boreal birch forests and alpine tundra.

== Background ==
=== Geography ===
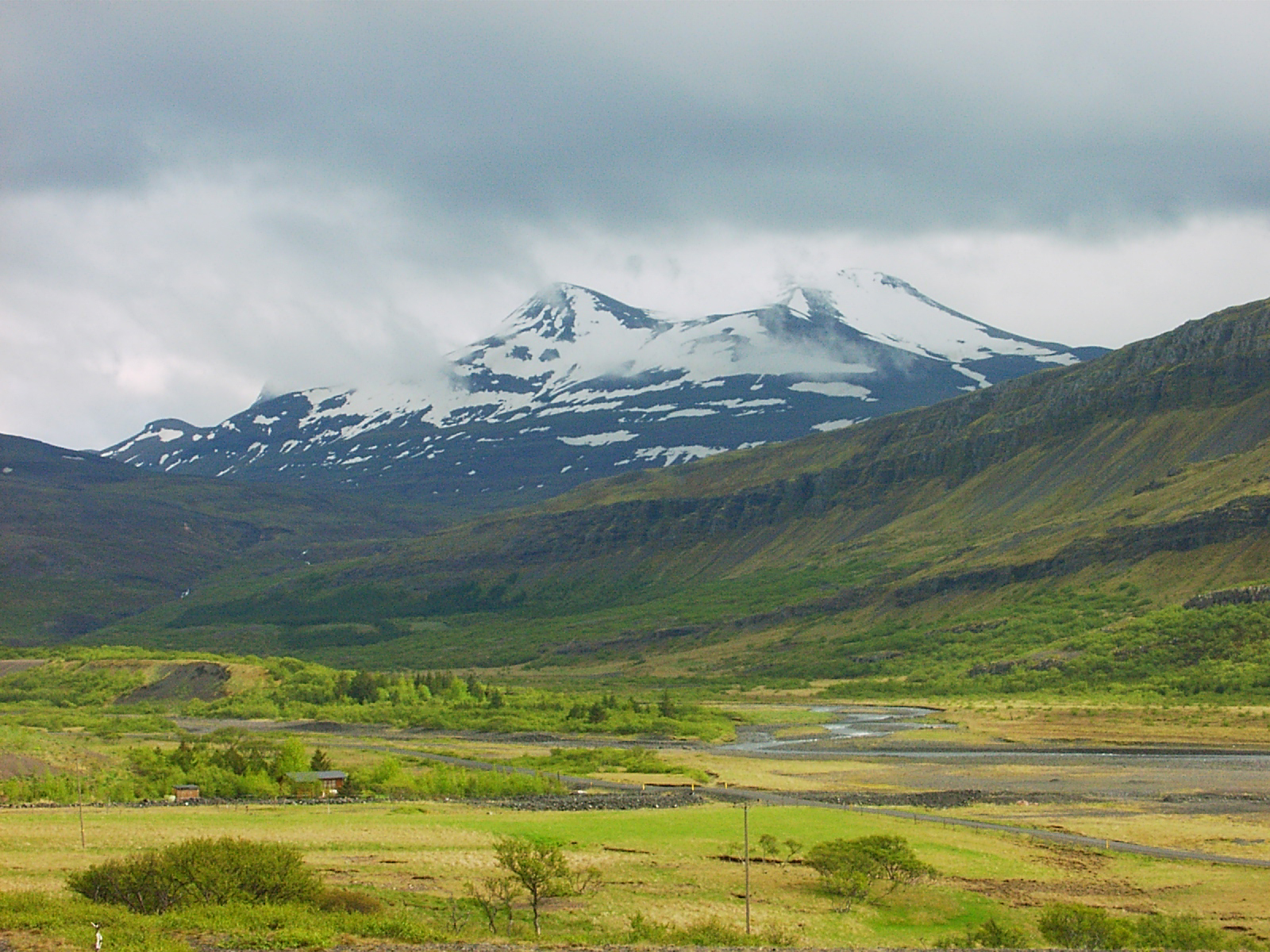
View into the Botnsdalur Mountains in western Iceland from the Hvalfjörður

Iceland is of volcanic origin with the landscape being influenced by water and wind erosion, abrasion and frost action. The Highlands form a plateau some 500 m (1,640 ft) above sea level, lying in the central and southeastern part of the island, and occupy about 40% of the landmass; they consist largely of volcanic deserts interspersed with glaciers. Other parts of the country consist of mountains and hills surrounded by coastal lowlands, cut by steep-sided valleys and fiords. There are many small lakes and short, fast-flowing rivers. Only about 25% of the land has a complete cover of vegetation and two fifths of this is marshland. Another 69% is sparsely or very sparsely vegetated.

=== Climate ===
The climate is subarctic. In general, the southern part of the island is warmer, wetter, and windier than the north. The coldest part of the country is the Central Highlands. The low-lying inland areas further north are the driest part but these areas of the country get the heaviest snowfalls in winter. The climate is rendered warmer than other places at similar latitudes by the North Atlantic Current and the coast normally remains free of ice.

== Flora and funga ==
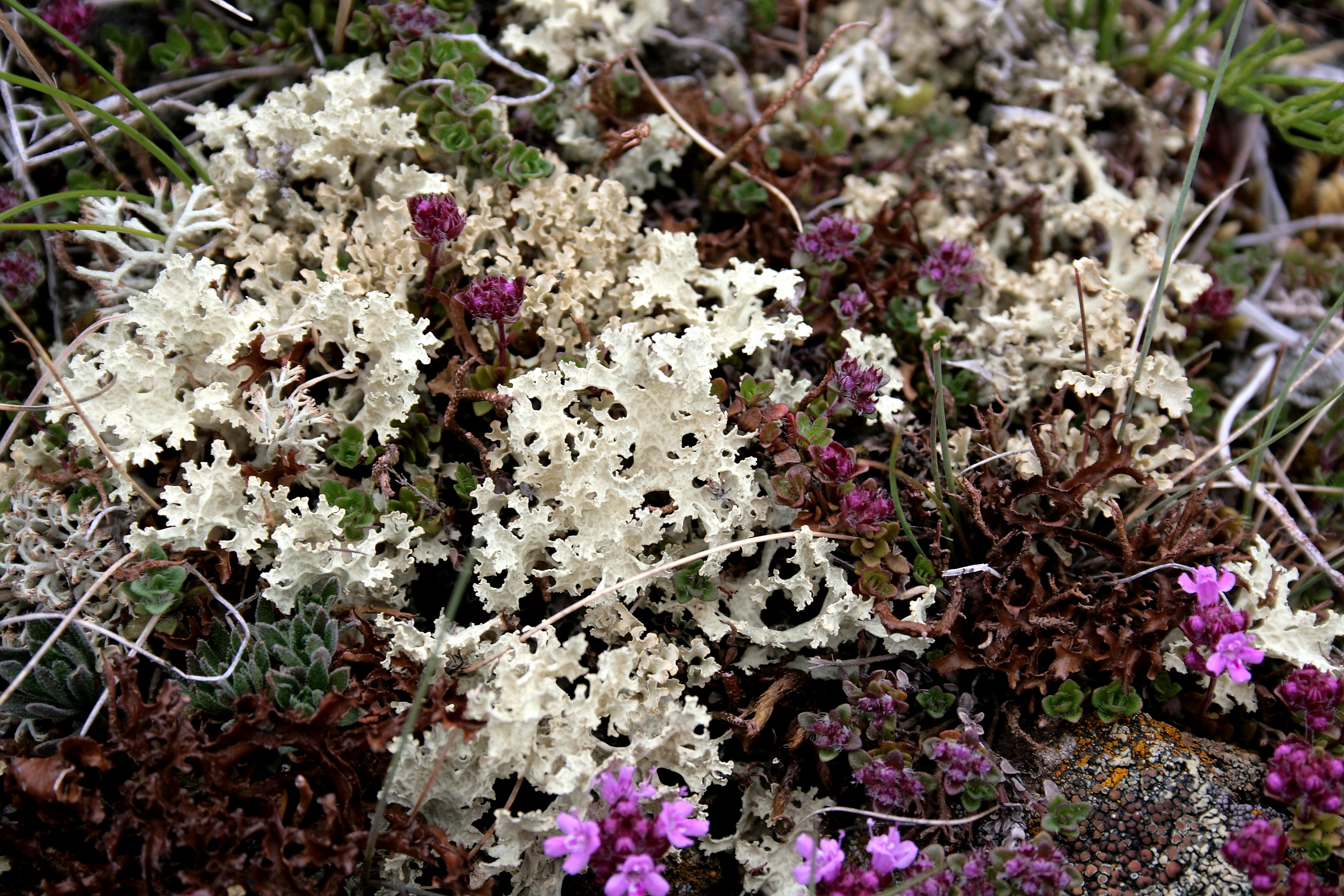
Iceland moss

There is a limited number of plant species in Iceland. Some of them are possibly survivors of the ice ages, while others were brought by wind and birds, in addition, some rafted on sea ice. Although the island was once fairly well forested at lower elevations, the arrival of settlers was followed by the felling of trees for construction and firewood and few trees now remain. The settlers introduced livestock, and overgrazing, particularly by sheep, led to damage to the volcanic soils. Three quarters of the island is now affected by soil erosion, with the remaining soil unable to support much vegetation. The flora includes about 540 species of plant, with woody plants typically including heather, bilberry, bearberry, crowberry, hairy birch, rowan and willow. Most of the trees are less than 2 m (7 ft) in height with a few taller trees in the river valleys of the north and east.

Much of the northern part of the country is marshy or tundra, with the vegetation being predominantly mosses, lichens and sedges. Typical is Iceland moss, a lichen which grows abundantly forming mats on the tundras and mountain slopes and which can provide "famine food" in times of necessity. Sedges and grasses dominate the vascular plants, with 53 species of the former and 47 of the latter. Of dicotyledonous plants, the most common family is the Asteraceae (daisy family), followed by the Caryophyllaceae (carnation family). There are around 560 species of bryophyte (mosses and liverworts), 550 species of lichen and 1,200 species of fungi, with both lichen and fungi being similar to those found in Scandinavia.

== Fauna ==
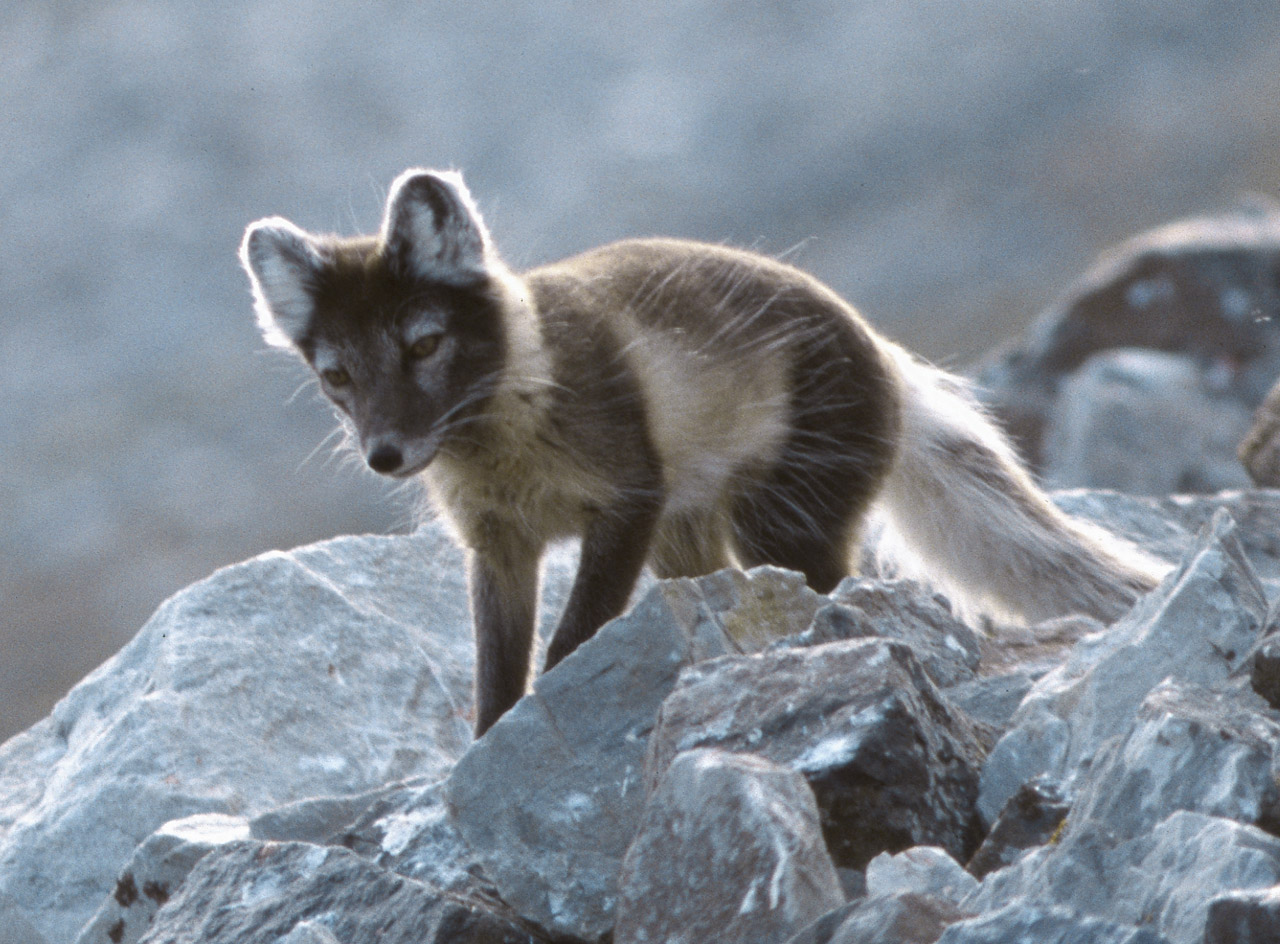
Arctic fox in summer coat

The only native land mammal on Iceland is the Arctic fox. Walruses were native to Iceland, but disappeared after human settlement, likely as a result of hunting, climate change and/or volcanism. Polar bears have been known to occasionally visit the island, mostly drifting there from Greenland. However, sightings of polar bears are rare, and those that are seen are usually killed for reasons of public safety.

Animals that have been introduced include the American mink, which escaped from fur farms and prospered, and the reindeer. A herd of reindeer in the southeast has died out but a larger herd in the northeast has a population of several thousand animals. The wood mouse has also been introduced and inhabits the countryside, with the house mouse, the brown rat and the black rat being restricted to urban areas. Bats have been increasingly recorded where they are thought to be either vagrants or artificially introduced.

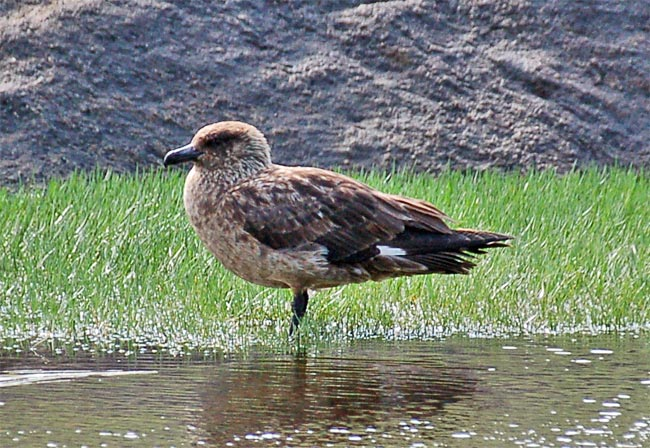
Great skua

About 72 species of bird breed on Iceland. These include the gyrfalcon, the white-tailed eagle, the merlin, the snowy owl and the short-eared owl. There are also ducks, geese, waders, gulls and other sea birds, the Arctic skua and the great skua, with the Icelandic population of the latter representing almost half of the total world population. There are few passerines (perching birds), perhaps because of a lack of nesting opportunities or a dearth of insect food at some times of year.

The rivers and lakes are home to Atlantic salmon, brown trout and Arctic char, as well as European eel and three-spined stickleback, and there are rainbow trout which have escaped from fish hatcheries. No species of reptiles or amphibians are known to live on Iceland.

Around 270 species of marine fish occur in the waters around Iceland, with the most important commercial species being cod, haddock, sea perch, plaice, herring, capelin and blue whiting. The harbour seal and the grey seal breed on beaches and several species of whale occur in the waters, as well as dolphins and harbour porpoises.
