= Salvelinus thingvallensis =

Conservation status
- Least Concern (IUCN 3.1)

Scientific classification
- Kingdom: Animalia
- Phylum: Chordata
- Class: Actinopterygii
- Order: Salmoniformes
- Family: Salmonidae
- Subfamily: Salmoninae
- Genus: Salvelinus
- Species: S. thingvallensis

Binomial name
- Salvelinus thingvallensis (Saemundsson, 1909)

Synonyms
- Salmo alpinus thingvallensis Saemundsson, 1908

Species of fish

Salvelinus thingvallensis is a cold-water fish in the family Salmonidae and one of the few vertebrate species exclusively endemic to Iceland.

Its binomial species name commemorates the Icelandic lake Þingvallavatn which includes the limited range in which the fish is found. Salvelinus thingvallensis was originally described by the Icelandic ichthyologist Bjarni Sæmundsson in 1909. According to the most recent IUCN assessment in 2008, the species is mostly nocturnal and hides between stones during day. Salvelinus thingvallensis is confirmed to live up to 17 years with first spawning usually occurring at 2–4 years of age in October or November. Salvelinus thingvallensis is documented to feed predominately on snails and less frequently on benthic insects.

== Description ==
The species is recognized by parr marks (dark vertical bars) in adults with a dark brown flank and irregular golden or yellow spots. The belly is beige to yellow in color with blackish markings often seen on throat. Spawning fish appear similar to non-breeding individuals. The pectoral fins are black, while other fins are beige. The caudal and dorsal fins include pale spots. The snout is blunt and rounded with an equal diameter to the eye. The mouth is subinferior, with a projecting upper jaw.
