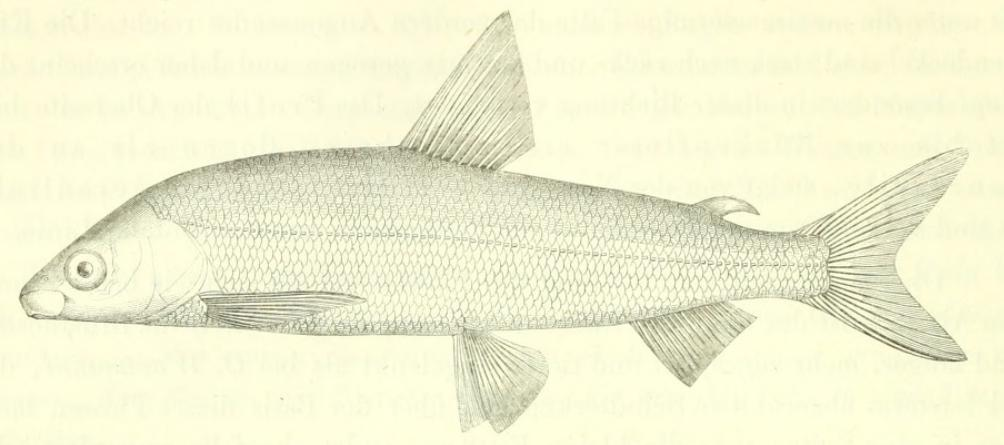

Conservation status
- Extinct (IUCN 3.1)

Scientific classification
- Kingdom: Animalia
- Phylum: Chordata
- Class: Actinopterygii
- Order: Salmoniformes
- Family: Salmonidae
- Genus: Coregonus
- Species: †C. gutturosus

Binomial name
- †Coregonus gutturosus (C. C. Gmelin (de), 1818)

= Coregonus gutturosus =

Lake Constance whitefish

Extinct species of fish

Coregonus gutturosus, the Lake Constance whitefish, is an extinct species of whitefish in the salmon family Salmonidae. It was formerly found only in deep areas of Lake Constance in the Alps.

== Extinction ==
Coregonus gutturosus was a deep water whitefish that reached a length of 29 cm (11 in). Coregonus gutturosus was highly sensitive to environmental changes and it is thought that the eutrophication of Lake Constance, which peaked in 1979, irreversibly affected the development of the eggs of the species.

Surveys undertaken at the start of the 21st century failed to find any evidence of the survival of the Lake Constance whitefish.
