= Salvelinus murta =

Conservation status
- Least Concern (IUCN 3.1)

Scientific classification
- Domain: Eukaryota
- Kingdom: Animalia
- Phylum: Chordata
- Class: Actinopterygii
- Order: Salmoniformes
- Family: Salmonidae
- Genus: Salvelinus
- Species: S. murta

Binomial name
- Salvelinus murta (Saemundsson, 1909)

Species of fish

Salvelinus murta, also known as the Murta char, is a cold-water fish in the family Salmonidae sometimes referenced as a subspecies of Arctic char. The Murta char is one of the few vertebrate species exclusively endemic to Iceland. The species range lies entirely within the lake Þingvallavatn. The Murta Char was originally described by the Icelandic ichthyologist Bjarni Sæmundsson in 1909. According to the most recent IUCN assessment in 2008, there are some piscivorous individual variants displaying non-standard morphology that eat three-spined stickleback although most individuals rely heavily on zooplankton and aquatic insects. The Murta Char is confirmed to live up to 18 years with first spawning usually occurring at 3–6 years of age in October.

== Description ==
The species is recognized by silvery bluish flanks and pale spots. Spawning males become more brown with yellow tinted spots. There is no obvious white anterior margin to the pectoral, pelvic, or anal fins. The snout is conical and has a longer diameter than the eye. The mouth is subterminal, with only a slight projection of the upper jaw.
