= Loch Coulin =

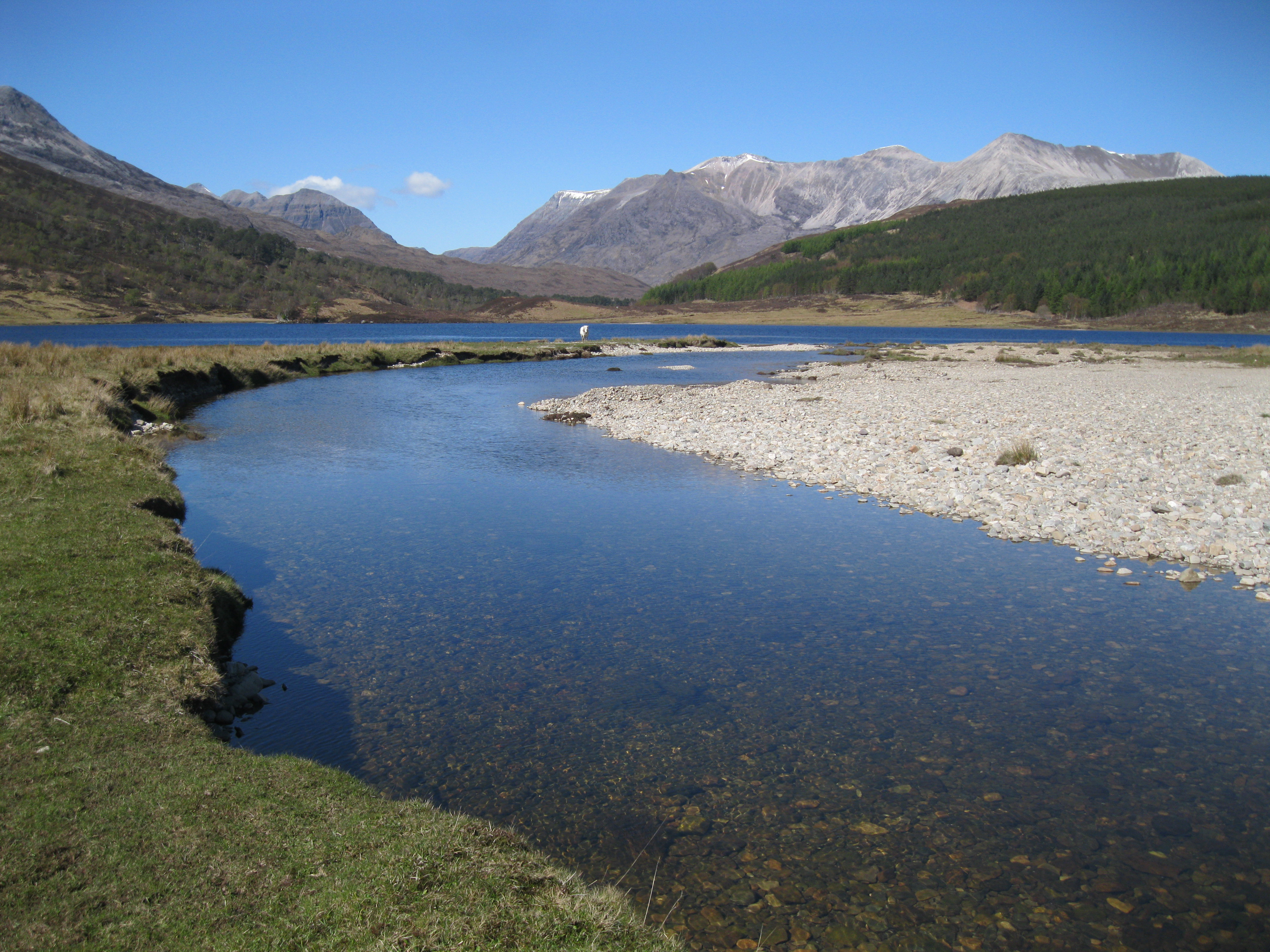
- River Coulin entering Loch Coulin with the mountain massif and Sgurr Dubh in the foreground

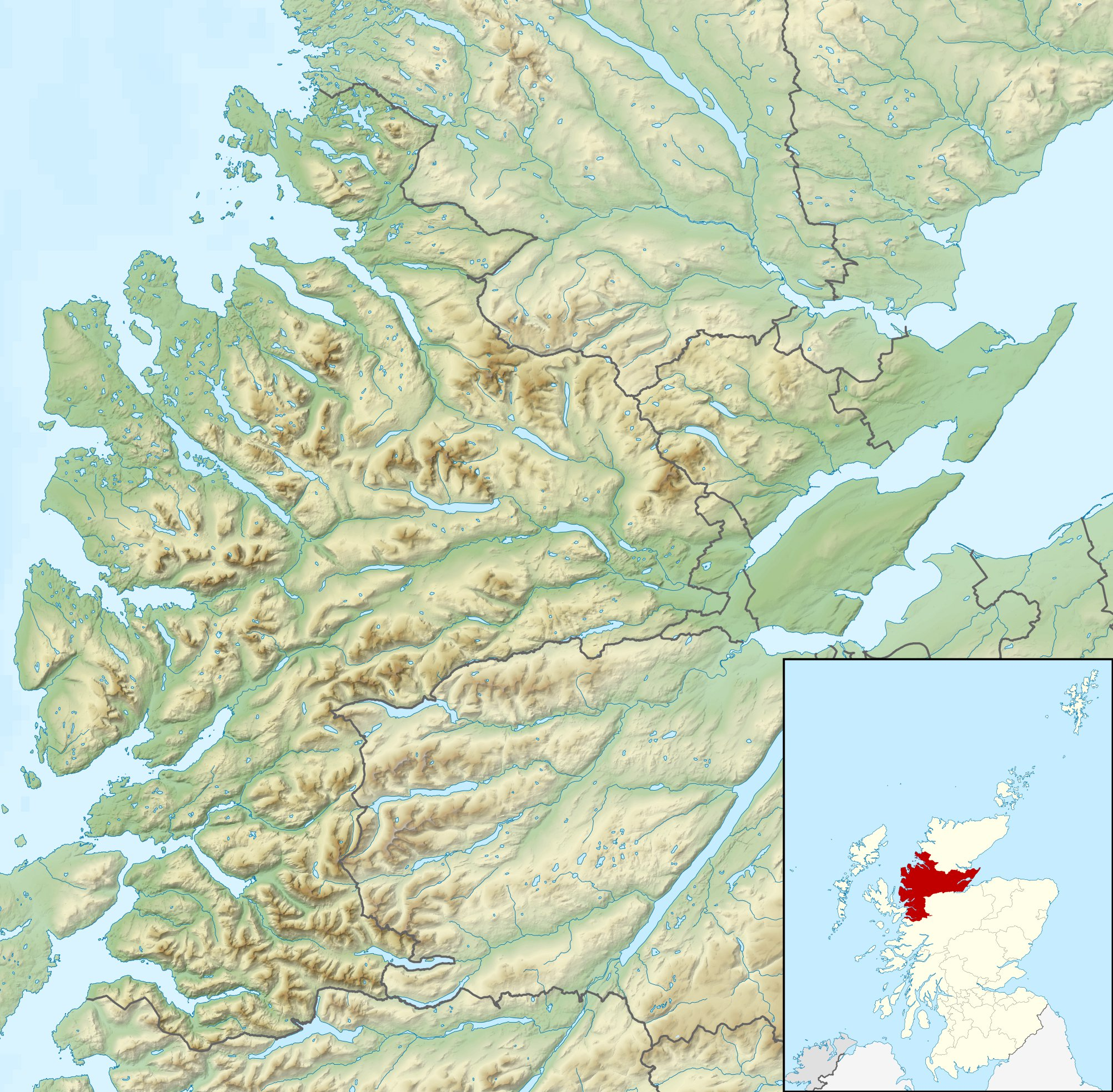
- Location in Wester Ross
- Location: NH01405535
- Coordinates: 57.543941°N 5.319084°W
- Type: freshwater loch
- Primary inflows: River Coulin
- Basin countries: Scotland
- Max. length: 0.55 km (0.34 mi)
- Max. width: 0.9 km (0.56 mi)
- Surface area: 36 ha (89 acres)
- Average depth: 18.3 ft (5.6 m)
- Max. depth: 48.8 ft (14.9 m)
- Water volume: 70,361,436.38 ft^{3} (1,992,414.000 m^{3})
- Shore length^{1}: 4 km (2.5 mi)
- Surface elevation: 96 m (315 ft)
- Max. temperature: 57 °F (14 °C)
- Min. temperature: 53 °F (12 °C) at 40 feet
- ^{1} Shore length is not a well-defined measure.

Loch Coulin is a small remote shallow low-altitude freshwater lochan, located within the Coulin Forest, some four miles to the south-west of Kinlochewe in Wester Ross. It is fed by the river Coulin from the south and its outflow is into Loch Clair in the north-west. Loch Coulin is within Beinn Eighe National Nature Reserve.

== Geography ==
Loch Coulin is in small irregular shaped loch that opens to north-east facing channel that is some 200 metres wide, that progressively reduces in width, before finally becoming a small river before it meets Loch Clair. The River Coulin is the primary inflow to the loch at the south-east end of the loch along with Allt na Fèithe Buildhe. To the north-east is bounded to the north by a mountain massif in the Torridon area that contains the highest peak of Beinn Eighe, that is within Beinn Eighe National Nature Reserve. To the west of the loch is Sugrr Dubh at 782 metres. To the south is a continuation of the mountainous Coulin Forest, with Meall an Leathaid Mhòir at an altitude of 512 metres. To the south is a continuation of the mountainous Coulin Forest, with Meall an Leathaid Mhòir at altitude 512 metres and a series of small hills forming a ridge in an east to west direction. To the east is a boggy flat plain.

== Walking ==
Loch Coulin is the location of an almost level hiking route that follows the north coast of the Loch Clair, before making a circular walk around Loch Coulin and is about 9.64 km long.

== Gallery ==
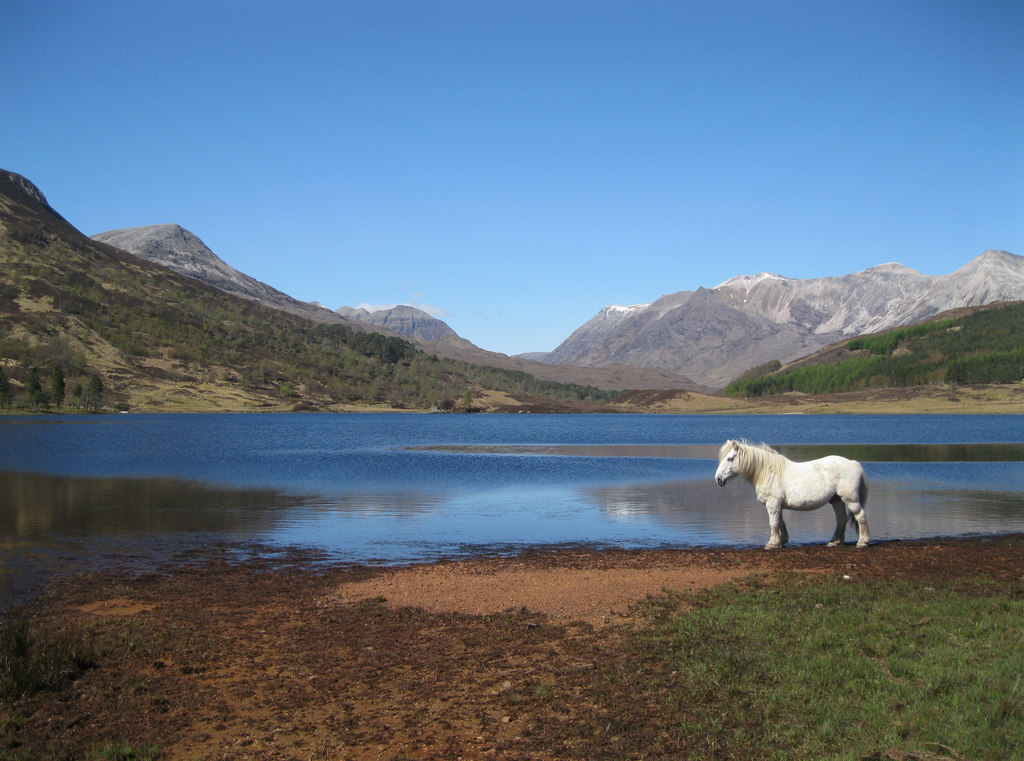
A highland pony in front of Loch Coulin

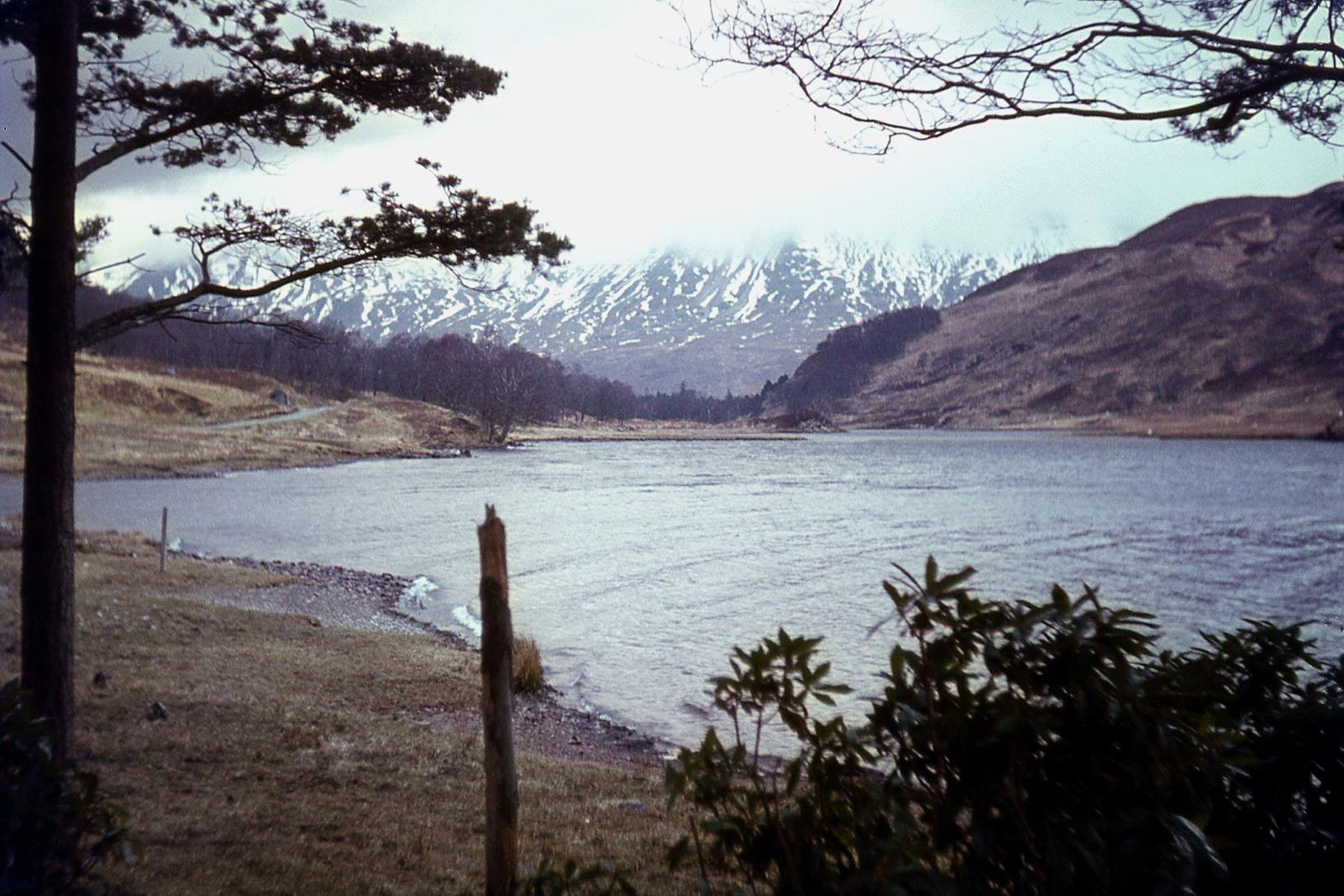
Loch Coulin in winter

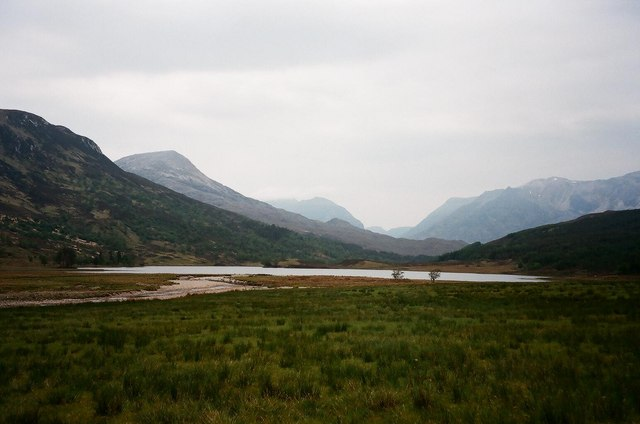
Loch Coulin with the Torridon mountains behind it

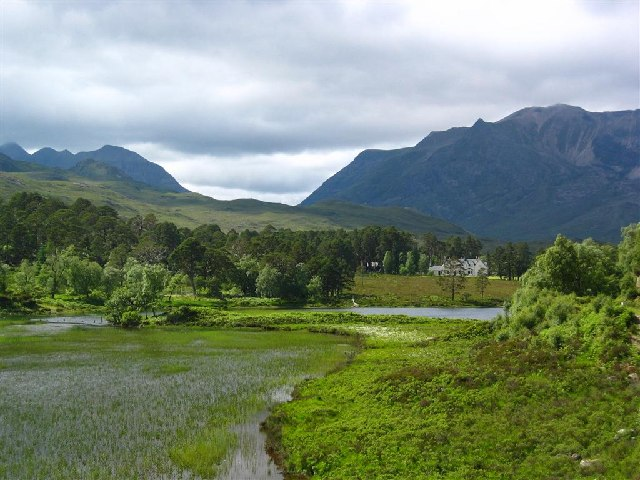
Coulin Lodge from Loch Coulin

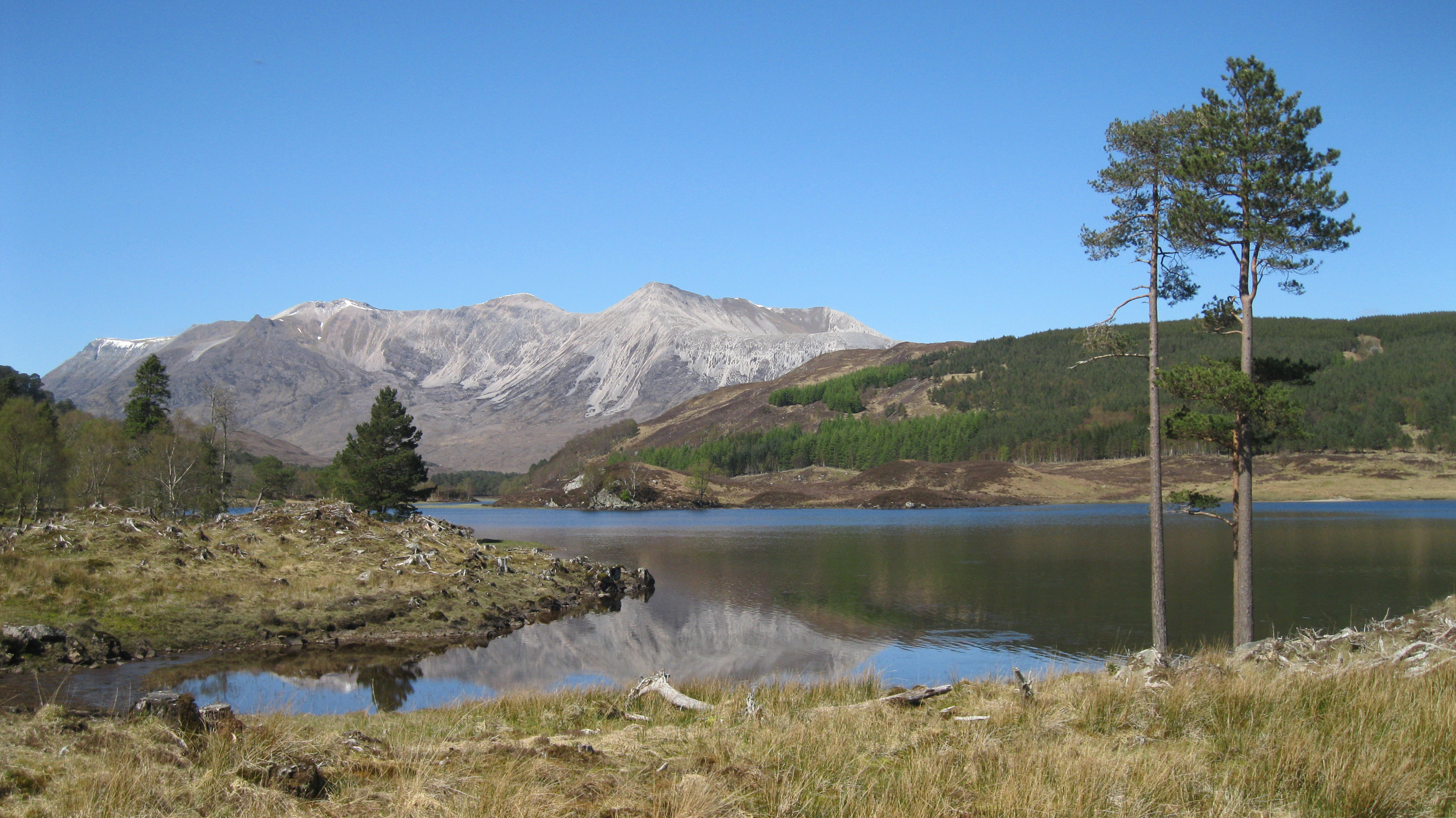
Loch Coulin and Beinn Eighe
