= Salvelinus neocomensis =

Conservation status
- Extinct (yes) (IUCN 3.1)

Scientific classification
- Kingdom: Animalia
- Phylum: Chordata
- Class: Actinopterygii
- Division: Teleostei
- Order: Salmoniformes
- Family: Salmonidae
- Genus: Salvelinus
- Species: †S. neocomensis

Binomial name
- †Salvelinus neocomensis (Freyhof & Kottelat, 2005)

Extinct species of fish

Salvelinus neocomensis is an extinct deepwater trout species only known from three specimens fished in Lake Neuchâtel (Neuenburgersee) in 1896, 1902 and 1904.

== Extinction ==
This rare endemic trout lived in the great depths of the lake, below 80 m (260 ft). It only reached about 15 cm (5.9 in) in length. It had fins without white margins and yellowish flanks, which earned it the local name Jaunet. Research undertaken in the 1950s and 2003 failed to find evidence of the survival of this species after the last reported specimen.
