= List of fishes of Germany =

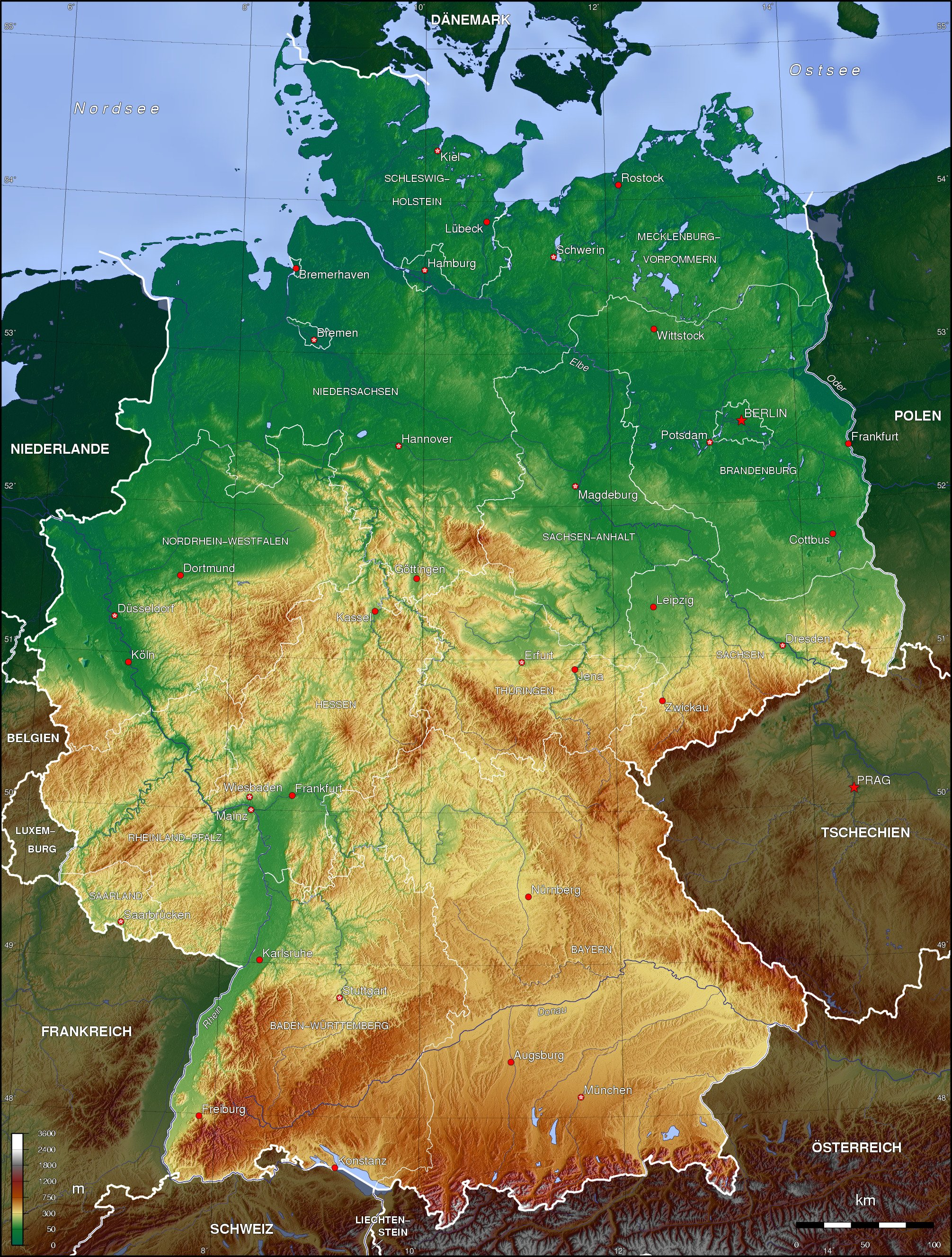

The list of fishes of Germany consists of indigenous and introduced species. It consists of 277 species, including three which are extinct.

The following tags are used to indicate the conservation status of species with IUCN criteria:

EX	Extinct
CR	Critically endangered
EN	Endangered
VU	Vulnerable
NT	Near threatened
LC	Least concern
DD	Data deficient
NE	Not evaluated

All the listed species are classified by their origin as freshwater, brackish water, marine, anadromous, catadromous, and euryhaline; also classified as native, introduced, invasive, and species found accidentally (difficult to characterize it as native or invasive).

Scientific name	Taxa authority	English name	German name	IUCN status	Image
Ordo: Myxiniformes
Family: Myxinidae
Myxine glutinosa	Linnaeus, 1758	Atlantic hagfish	Blindinger, Schleimaal	Least concern	
Ordo: Petromyzontiformes
Family: Petromyzontidae
Eudontomyzon danfordi	Regan, 1911	Carpathian brook lamprey	Donau-Neunauge	Least concern	
Eudontomyzon vladykovi	Oliva & Zanandrea, 1959	Vladykov's lamprey	Donaubachneunauge	Least concern	
Lampetra fluviatilis	(Linnaeus, 1758)	European river lamprey	Fluss-Neunauge	Least concern	
Lampetra planeri	Bloch, 1784	European brook lamprey	Bachpricke	Least concern	
Petromyzon marinus	Linnaeus, 1758	Sea lamprey	Meerneunauge	Least concern	
Ordo: Chimaeriformes
Family: Chimaeridae
Chimaera monstrosa	Linnaeus, 1758	Rabbit fish	Seekatze, Spöke	Least concern	
Ordo: Rajiformes
Family: Rajidae
Amblyraja radiata	(Donovan, 1808)	Thorny skate	Sternrochen	Vulnerable	
Dipturus batis	Linnaeus, 1758	Common skate	Glattrochen	Critically endangered	
Leucoraja fullonica	(Linnaeus, 1758)	Shagreen ray	Chagrinrochen	Near threatened	
Raja clavata	Linnaeus, 1758	Thornback ray	Nagelrochen	Near threatened	
Raja montagui	(Fowler, 1910)	Spotted ray	Fleckrochen	Not evaluated	
Ordo: Myliobatiformes
Family: Dasyatidae
Dasyatis pastinaca	Linnaeus, 1758	Common stingray	Peitschenrochen	Data deficient	
Ordo: Carcharhiniformes
Family: Carcharhinidae
Prionace glauca	(Linnaeus, 1758)	Blue shark	Blauhai	Least concern	
Family: Triakidae
Galeorhinus galeus	(Linnaeus, 1758)	School shark	Hundshai	Vulnerable	
Mustelus asterias	Cloquet, 1821	Starry smooth-hound	Weißgefleckte Glatthai	Least concern	
Family: Scyliorhinidae
Galeus melastomus	Rafinesque, 1810	Blackmouth catshark	Fleckhai	Least concern	
Scyliorhinus canicula	(Linnaeus, 1758)	Small-spotted catshark	Kleiner Katzenhai	Not evaluated	
Scyliorhinus stellaris	(Linnaeus, 1758)	Nursehound	Großer Katzenhai	Near threatened	
Ordo: Lamniformes
Family: Lamnidae
Lamna nasus	(Bonnaterre, 1788)	Porbeagle	Heringshai	Vulnerable	
Family: Alopiidae
Alopias vulpinus	(Bonnaterre, 1788)	Common thresher	Drescher	Vulnerable	
Family: Cetorhinidae
Cetorhinus maximus	(Gunnerus, 1765)	Basking shark	Riesenhai	Vulnerable	
Ordo: Hexanchiformes
Family: Hexanchidae
Hexanchus griseus	Bonnaterre, 1788	Bluntnose sixgill shark	Stumpfnasen-Sechskiemerhai	Near threatened	
Ordo: Squaliformes
Family: Squalidae
Squalus acanthias	Linnaeus, 1758	Spiny dogfish	Dornhai	Vulnerable	
Family: Dalatiidae
Dalatias licha	Bonnaterre, 1788	Kitefin shark	Schokoladenhai	Near threatened	
Family: Echinorhinidae
Echinorhinus brucus	Bonnaterre, 1788	Bramble shark	Nagelhai	Data deficient	
Family: Somniosidae
Somniosus microcephalus	Bloch & Schneider, 1801	Greenland shark	Grönlandhai	Near threatened	
Ordo: Squatiniformes
Family: Squatinidae
Squatina squatina	Linnaeus, 1758	Angelshark	Engelhai	Critically endangered	
Ordo: Acipenseriformes
Family: Acipenseridae
Acipenser baerii	(Brandt, 1869)	Siberian sturgeon	Sibirischer Stör	Endangered	
Acipenser gueldenstaedtii	(Brandt & Ratzeburg, 1833)	Russian sturgeon	Donau-Stör	Critically endangered	
Acipenser oxyrinchus	Mitchell, 1815	Atlantic sturgeon	Baltischer Stör	Near threatened	
Acipenser ruthenus	Linnaeus, 1758	Sterlet	Sterlet	Vulnerable	
Acipenser sturio	Linnaeus, 1758	European sea sturgeon	Schirk	Critically endangered	
Family: Polyodontidae
Polyodon spathula	Walbaum, 1792	American paddlefish	Löffelstör	Vulnerable	
Ordo: Anguilliformes
Family: Anguillidae
Anguilla anguilla	Linnaeus, 1758	European eel	Europäischer Aal	Critically endangered	
Family: Congridae
Conger conger	Linnaeus, 1758	European conger	Meeraal	Not evaluated	
Ordo: Clupeiformes
Family: Engraulidae
Engraulis encrasicolus	Linnaeus, 1758	European anchovy	Sardelle	Not evaluated	
Family: Clupeidae
Alosa alosa	(Linnaeus, 1758)	Allis shad	Maifisch	Least concern	
Alosa fallax	Lacépède, 1800	Twait shad	Finte	Least concern	
Clupea harengus	(Linnaeus, 1758)	Atlantic herring	Atlantischer Hering	Least concern	
Sardina pilchardus	Walbaum, 1792	European pilchard	Europäische Sardine	Not evaluated	
Sprattus sprattus	(Linnaeus, 1758)	European sprat	Europäische Sprotte	Not evaluated	
Ordo: Salmoniformes
Family: Salmonidae
Coregonus albula	(Linnaeus, 1758)	European cisco	Kleine Maräne	Least concern	
Coregonus arenicolus	(Kottelat, 1997)		Bodensee Sandfelchen	Vulnerable	
Coregonus bavaricus	Hofer, 1909	Kilch	Ammersee-Kilch	Critically endangered	
Coregonus candidus	(Thienemann, 1912)		Schweizer Bondelle	Vulnerable	
Coregonus clupeaformis	(Mitchill, 1818)	Lake whitefish	Heringsmaräne	Not evaluated	
Coregonus fontanae	Schulz & Freyhof, 2003	Fontane cisco	Stechlin-Maräne	Least concern	
Coregonus gutturosus	(Gmelin, 1818)	Lake Constance whitefish	Bodensee-Kilch	Extinct	
Coregonus hoferi	Berg, 1932		Chiemsee-Renke	Critically endangered	
Coregonus holsata	Thienemann, 1916		Kilch	Not evaluated	
Coregonus lavaretus	(Linnaeus, 1758)	European whitefish	Große Maräne, Lavaret	Vulnerable	
Coregonus lucinensis	Thienemann, 1916		Luzin-Quietschbauch, Quietschbükers	Vulnerable	
Coregonus macrophthalmus	Nüsslin, 1882		Gangfisch	Least concern	
Coregonus maraena	(Bloch, 1779)	Maraena whitefish	Ostseeschnäpel	Vulnerable	
Coregonus maraenoides	(Berg, 1916)	Peipsi whitefish		Not evaluated	
Coregonus oxyrinchus	(Linnaeus, 1758)	Houting	Nordseeschnäpel	Extinct	
Coregonus peled	(Gmelin, 1788)	Peled	Peledmaräne	Least concern	
Coregonus pidschian	Gmelin, 1789	Humpback whitefish	Kleine Bodenrenke	Least concern	
Coregonus renke	(Schrank, 1783)		Starnberger Renke	Data deficient	
Coregonus wartmanni	(Bloch, 1784)		Bodenseefelchen	Least concern	
Coregonus widegreni	Malmgren, 1863	Pool whitefish	Buckelmaräne	Data deficient	
Hucho hucho	(Linnaeus, 1758)	Danube salmon	Huchen	Endangered	
Oncorhynchus gorbuscha	(Walbaum, 1792)	Pink salmon	Buckellachs	Not evaluated	
Oncorhynchus kisutch	(Walbaum, 1792)	Coho salmon	Silberlachs	Not evaluated	
Oncorhynchus mykiss	(Walbaum, 1792)	Rainbow trout	Regenbogenforelle	Not evaluated	
Oncorhynchus tshawytscha	(Walbaum, 1792)	Chinook salmon	Königslachs	Not evaluated	
Salmo carpio	Linnaeus, 1758	Carpione	Gardaseeforelle	Critically endangered	
Salmo salar	Linnaeus, 1758	Atlantic salmon	Atlantischer Lachs	Least concern	
Salmo trutta	Linnaeus, 1758	Brown trout	Forelle	Least concern	
Salvelinus alpinus	(Linnaeus, 1758)	Arctic char	Seesaibling	Least concern	
Salvelinus evasus	Freyhof & Kottelat, 2005	Ammersee saibling	Ammersee-Saibling	Vulnerable	
Salvelinus leucomaenis	(Pallas, 1814)	White-spotted char	Japan-Saibling	Not evaluated	
Salvelinus namaycush	(Walbaum, 1792)	Lake trout	Amerikanischer Seesaibling	Least concern	
Salvelinus profundus	(Schillinger, 1901)	Deepwater char	Bodensee-Tiefensaibling	Extinct	
Salvelinus umbla	(Linnaeus, 1758)	Lake char	Schwarzrötel	Least concern	
Thymallus thymallus	Linnaeus, 1758	Grayling	Europäische Äsche	Least concern	
Ordo: Esociformes
Family: Esocidae
Esox lucius	Linnaeus, 1758	Northern pike	Hecht	Least concern	
Family: Umbridae
Umbra krameri	Walbaum, 1792	European mudminnow	Europäischer Hundsfisch	Vulnerable	
Umbra pygmaea	(DeKay, 1842)	Eastern mudminnow	Kleiner Hundsfisch	Not evaluated	
Ordo: Osmeriformes
Family: Osmeridae
Osmerus eperlanus	(Linnaeus, 1758)	European smelt	Europäische Stint	Not evaluated	
Ordo: Myctophiformes
Family: Myctophidae
Hygophum benoiti	(Cocco, 1838)	Benoit's lanternfish	Ostatlantischer Laternenfisch	Not evaluated	
Ordo: Characiformes
Family: Characidae
Roeboides dayi	(Steindachner, 1878)	Glass sardine	Dayis-Raubgalssalmler	Not evaluated	
Ordo: Cypriniformes
Family: Cyprinidae
Abramis brama	Linnaeus, 1758	Common bream	Brachse	Least concern	
Alburnoides bipunctatus	(Bloch, 1782)	Schneider	Schneider	Least concern	
Alburnus alburnus	Linnaeus, 1758	Common bleak	Ukelei	Least concern	
Alburnus chalcoides	(Güldenstädt, 1772)	Danube bleak	Mairenke	Least concern	
Alburnus mento	Heckel, 1836	Alp bleak	Alpen-Ukelei	Not evaluated	
Aspius aspius	(Linnaeus, 1758)	Asp	Rapfen	Least concern	
Ballerus ballerus	(Linnaeus, 1758)	Zope	Zope	Least concern	
Ballerus sapa	Pallas, 1814	White-eye bream	Zobel	Least concern	
Barbus barbus	Linnaeus, 1758	Common barbel	Barbe	Least concern	
Blicca bjoerkna	(Linnaeus, 1758)	Silver bream	Güster	Least concern	
Carassius auratus	(Linnaeus, 1758)	Goldfish	Goldfisch	Not evaluated	
Carassius carassius	(Linnaeus, 1758)	Crucian carp	Karausche	Least concern	
Carassius gibelio	(Bloch, 1782)	Prussian carp	Giebel	Least concern	
Chondrostoma nasus	Linnaeus, 1758	Common nase	Nase	Least concern	
Ctenopharyngodon idella	(Valenciennes, 1844)	Grass carp	Weißer Amur	Not evaluated	
Cyprinus carpio	Linnaeus, 1758	Common carp	Karpfen	Least concern	
Gobio gobio	(Linnaeus, 1758)	Gudgeon	Gründling	Least concern	
Gobio obtusirostris	Valenciennes, 1842		Kurzschnäuziger Gründling	Not evaluated	
Hypophthalmichthys molitrix	(Valenciennes, 1844)	Silver carp	Silberkarpfen	Near threatened	
Hypophthalmichthys nobilis	(Richandson, 1845)	Bighead carp	Marmorkarpfen	Data deficient	
Leucaspius delineatus	Heckel, 1843	Belica	Moderlieschen	Least concern	
Leuciscus idus	Linnaeus, 1758	Ide	Aland	Least concern	
Leuciscus leuciscus	(Linnaeus, 1758)	Common dace	Hasel	Least concern	
Pelecus cultratus	(Linnaeus, 1758)	Ziege	Ziege	Least concern	
Phoxinus phoxinus	(Linnaeus, 1758)	Common minnow	Elritze	Least concern	
Pimephales promelas	(Rafinesque, 1820)	Fathead minnow	Fettköpfige Elritze	Not evaluated	
Pseudorasbora parva	Temminck & Schlegel, 1846	Stone moroko	Blaubandbärbling	Not evaluated	
Rhodeus amarus	Bloch, 1782	European bitterling	Bitterling	Least concern	
Rhodeus sericeus	(Pallas, 1776)	Amur bitterling	Bitterling	Least concern	
Rhynchocypris percnurus	(Pallas, 1814)	Swamp minnow	Sumpfelritze	Least concern	
Romanogobio albipinnatus	Bănărescu, 1953	White-finned gudgeon	Weißflossen-Gründling	Least concern	
Romanogobio belingi	(Slastenenko, 1934)		Stromgründling	Least concern	
Romanogobio kesslerii	(Dybowski, 1862)	Kessler's gudgeon	Kessler Gründling	Least concern	
Romanogobio uranoscopus	(Agassiz, 1828)	Danube gudgeon	Steingreßling	Least concern	
Rutilus meidingeri	Heckel, 1851		Perlfisch	Endangered	
Rutilus pigus	Lacépède, 1803	Pigo	Frauennerfling	Least concern	
Rutilus rutilus	Linnaeus, 1758	Common roach	Rotauge	Least concern	
Scardinius erythrophthalmus	(Linnaeus, 1758)	Common rudd	Rotfeder	Least concern	
Squalius cephalus	Linnaeus, 1758	European chub	Döbel	Least concern	
Telestes souffia	(Risso, 1827)	Western vairone	Französischer Strömer	Least concern	
Tinca tinca	(Linnaeus, 1758)	Tench	Schleie	Least concern	
Vimba vimba	Linnaeus, 1758	Vimba bream	Zährte	Least concern	
Family: Cobitidae
Cobitis taenia	Linnaeus, 1758	Spined loach	Dorngrundel	Least concern	
Misgurnus anguillicaudatus	(Cantor, 1842)	Dojo loach	Ostasiatischer Schlammpeitzger	Not evaluated	
Misgurnus fossilis	(Linnaeus, 1758)	European weatherfish	Europäischer Schlammpeitzger	Least concern	
Family: Balitoridae
Barbatula barbatula	(Linnaeus, 1758)	Stone loach	Sibirische Bartschmerle	Least concern	
Ordo: Siluriformes
Family: Ictaluridae
Ameiurus melas	Rafinesque, 1820	Black bullhead	Schwarzer Zwergwels	Not evaluated	
Ameiurus nebulosus	Lesueur, 1819	Brown bullhead	Katzenwels	Not evaluated	
Family: Siluridae
Silurus glanis	Linnaeus, 1758	Wels catfish	Flusswels	Least concern	
Ordo: Lophiiformes
Family: Lophiidae
Lophius budegassa	Spinola, 1807	Blackbellied angler	Kleiner Seeteufel	Not evaluated	
Lophius piscatorius	Linnaeus, 1758	Sea-devil	Seeteufel	Not evaluated	
Ordo: Gadiformes
Family: Phycidae
Phycis blennoides	(Brünnich, 1768)	Greater forkbeard	Großer Gabeldorsch	Not evaluated	
Family: Gadidae
Gadiculus argenteus	Guichenot, 1850	Silvery pout	Silberdorsch	Not evaluated	
Gadus morhua	Linnaeus, 1758	Atlantic cod	Dorsch, Kabeljau	Vulnerable	
Melanogrammus aeglefinus	(Linnaeus, 1758)	Haddock	Schellfisch	Vulnerable	
Merlangius merlangus	Linnaeus, 1758	Wittling	Wittling	Not evaluated	
Micromesistius poutassou	(Risso, 1827)	Blue whiting	Blauer Wittling	Not evaluated	
Pollachius pollachius	(Linnaeus, 1758)	Pollack	Pollack, Steinköhler	Not evaluated	
Pollachius virens	(Linnaeus, 1758)	Coalfish	Köhler	Not evaluated	
Raniceps raninus	(Linnaeus, 1758)	Tadpole fish	Froschdorsch	Not evaluated	
Trisopterus esmarkii	Nilsson, 1855	Norway pout	Stintdorsch	Not evaluated	
Trisopterus luscus	(Linnaeus, 1758)	Pouting	Franzosendorsch	Not evaluated	
Trisopterus minutus	(Linnaeus, 1758)	Poor cod	Zwergdorsch	Not evaluated	
Family: Lotidae
Ciliata mustela	(Linnaeus, 1758)	Fivebeard rockling	Fünfbärtelige Seequappe	Not evaluated	
Ciliata septentrionalis	Collett, 1875	Northern rockling	Nordische Seequappe	Not evaluated	
Enchelyopus cimbrius	(Linnaeus, 1766)	Fourbeard rockling	Vierbärtelige Seequappe	Not evaluated	
Gaidropsarus mediterraneus	(Linnaeus, 1758)	Shore rockling	Mittelmeer-Seequappe	Not evaluated	
Gaidropsarus vulgaris	(Cloquet, 1824)	Three-bearded rockling	Dreibärtelige Seequappe	Not evaluated	
Lota lota	Oken, 1817	Burbot	Quappe	Least concern	
Molva molva	(Linnaeus, 1758)	Common ling	Leng	Not evaluated	
Family: Merlucciidae
Merluccius merluccius	(Linnaeus, 1758)	European hake	Hechtdorsch	Not evaluated	
Ordo: Ophidiiformes
Family: Carapidae
Echiodon drummondii	Thompson, 1837	Drummond's pearlfish	Eingeweidefische	Least concern	
Ordo: Atheriniformes
Family: Atherinidae
Atherina presbyter	Risso, 1810	Sand smelt	Priesterfisch, Ährenfisch	Not evaluated	
Ordo: Beloniformes
Family: Belonidae
Belone belone	(Linnaeus, 1761)	Garfish	Hornhecht	Not evaluated	
Family: Scomberesocidae
Scomberesox saurus	(Walbaum, 1792)	Atlantic saury	Makrelenhecht	Not evaluated	
Ordo: Gasterosteiformes
Family: Gasterosteidae
Gasterosteus aculeatus	Linnaeus, 1758	Three-spined stickleback	Großer Stichling	Least concern	
Gasterosteus gymnurus	Cuvier, 1829	Nakedtail stickleback	Stichling	Least concern	
Pungitius laevis	(Cuvier, 1829)	Smoothtail ninespined stickleback	Kleiner Stichling	Least concern	
Pungitius pungitius	(Linnaeus, 1758)	Ninespine stickleback	Kleiner Stichling	Least concern	
Spinachia spinachia	(Linnaeus, 1758)	Fifteenspine stickleback	Seestichling	Not evaluated	
Ordo: Syngnathiformes
Family: Syngnathidae
Entelurus aequoreus	(Linnaeus, 1758)	Snake pipefish	Große Schlangennadel	Data deficient	
Hippocampus guttulatus	(Cuvier, 1829)	Long-snouted seahorse	Langschnäuziges Seepferdchen	Data deficient	
Hippocampus hippocampus	(Linnaeus, 1758)	Short-snouted seahorse	Kurzschnäuziges Seepferdchen	Data deficient	
Nerophis lumbriciformis	(Jenyns, 1835)	Worm pipefish	Wurmfisch, Krummschnauzige Schlangennadel	Not evaluated	
Nerophis ophidion	(Linnaeus, 1758)	Straightnose pipefish	Kleine Schlangennadel	Not evaluated	
Syngnathus acus	Linnaeus, 1758	Greater pipefish	Große Seenadel	Not evaluated	
Syngnathus rostellatus	Nilsson, 1855	Lesser pipefish	Kleine Seenadel	Not evaluated	
Syngnathus typhle	Linnaeus, 1758	Broadnosed pipefish	Schmalschnäuzige Seenadel	Not evaluated	
Ordo: Zeiformes
Family: Zeidae
Zeus faber	Linnaeus, 1758	John Dory	Petersfisch	Not evaluated	
Ordo: Tetraodontiformes
Family: Molidae
Mola mola	(Linnaeus, 1758)	Ocean sunfish	Mondfisch	Not evaluated	
Ordo: Pleuronectiformes
Family: Scophthalmidae
Lepidorhombus whiffiagonis	(Walbaum, 1792)	Megrim	Flügelbutt	Not evaluated	
Phrynorhombus norvegicus	(Günther, 1862)	Norwegian topknot	Zwergbutt	Not evaluated	
Scophthalmus maximus	(Linnaeus, 1758)	Turbot	Steinbutt	Not evaluated	
Scophthalmus rhombus	(Linnaeus, 1758)	Brill	Glattbutt	Not evaluated	
Zeugopterus punctatus	(Bloch, 1787)	Topknot	Haarbutt	Not evaluated	
Family: Bothidae
Arnoglossus laterna	(Walbaum, 1792)	Mediterranean scaldfish	Lammzunge	Not evaluated	
Family: Pleuronectidae
Glyptocephalus cynoglossus	(Linnaeus, 1758)	Witch	Hundszunge	Not evaluated	
Hippoglossoides platessoides	(Fabricius, 1780)	American plaice	Doggerscharbe	Not evaluated	
Hippoglossus hippoglossus	(Linnaeus, 1758)	Atlantic halibut	Weißer Heilbutt	Endangered	
Limanda limanda	(Linnaeus, 1758)	Common dab	Kliesche	Not evaluated	
Microstomus kitt	Walbaum, 1792	Lemon sole	Rotzunge	Not evaluated	
Platichthys flesus	Linnaeus, 1758	European flounder	Flunder	Least concern	
Pleuronectes platessa	Linnaeus, 1758	European plaice	Scholle, Goldbutt	Least concern	
Family: Soleidae
Buglossidium luteum	(Risso, 1810)	Solenette	Solenette Zwergzunge	Not evaluated	
Solea solea	(Linnaeus, 1758)	Common sole	Seezunge	Not evaluated	
Ordo: Scorpaeniformes
Family: Agonidae
Agonus cataphractus	(Linnaeus, 1766)	Armed bullhead	Steinpicker	Not evaluated	
Family: Cyclopteridae
Cyclopterus lumpus	Linnaeus, 1766	Lumpsucker	Seehase	Not evaluated	
Family: Liparidae
Liparis liparis	(Linnaeus, 1766)	Common seasnail	Großer Scheibenbauch	Not evaluated	
Liparis montagui	(Donovan, 1804)	Montagu's seasnail	Kleiner Scheibenbausch	Not evaluated	
Family: Psychrolutidae
Cottunculus microps	Collett, 1875	Polar sculpin	Polarquappengroppe	Not evaluated	
Family: Triglidae
Chelidonichthys lucerna	(Linnaeus, 1758)	Tub gurnard	Roter Knurrhahn	Not evaluated	
Eutrigla gurnardus	(Linnaeus, 1758)	Grey gurnard	Grauer Knurrhahn	Not evaluated	
Family: Cottidae
Cottus gobio	Linnaeus, 1758	European bullhead	Mühlkoppe	Least concern	
Cottus microstomus	(Heckel, 1837)	Baltic sculpin	Baltische Groppe	Least concern	
Cottus perifretum	(Freyhof, Kottelat & Nolte, 2005)		Scheldegroppe	Least concern	
Cottus poecilopus	Heckel, 1837	Alpine bullhead	Buntflossenkoppe	Least concern	
Cottus rhenanus	(Freyhof, Kottelat & Nolte, 2005)		Rheingroppe	Least concern	
Micrenophrys lilljeborgii	Collett, 1875	Norway bullhead	Zwergseeskorpion	Not evaluated	
Myoxocephalus quadricornis	Linnaeus, 1758	Fourhorn sculpin	Vierhörniger Seeskorpion	Least concern	
Myoxocephalus scorpius	Linnaeus, 1758	Shorthorn sculpin	Seeskorpion	Not evaluated	
Taurulus bubalis	(Euphrasen, 1786)	Longspined bullhead	Langstacheliger Seeskorpion	Not evaluated	
Ordo: Perciformes
Family: Anarhichadidae
Anarhichas lupus	Linnaeus, 1758	Atlantic wolffish	Gestreifter Seewolf	Not evaluated	
Family: Bramidae
Brama brama	(Bannaterre, 1788)	Atlantic pomfret	Brachsenmakrele	Not evaluated	
Pterycombus brama	Fries, 1837	Atlantic fanfish	Silberbrassen	Not evaluated	
Taractes asper	Lowe, 1843	Rough pomfret	Kleine Brachsenmakrele	Not evaluated	
Taractichthys longipinnis	Lowe, 1843	Big-scale pomfret	Langflossen-Brachsenmakrele	Not evaluated	
Family: Blenniidae
Lipophrys pholis	(Linnaeus, 1758)	Shanny	Schleimlerche	Not evaluated	
Family: Callionymidae
Callionymus lyra	Linnaeus, 1758	Common dragonet	Gestreifter Leierfisch	Not evaluated	
Callionymus maculatus	Rafinesque, 1810	Spotted dragonet	Gefleckter Leierfisch	Not evaluated	
Callionymus reticulatus	Valenciennes, 1837	Reticulated dragonet	Ornament-Leierfisch	Not evaluated	
Family: Cichlidae
Oreochromis niloticus	(Linnaeus, 1758)	Nile tilapia	Nilbuntbarsch	Not evaluated	
Family: Echeneidae
Remora remora	(Linnaeus, 1758)	Common remora	Ansauger	Not evaluated	
Family: Odontobutidae
Perccottus glenii	(Dybowski, 1877)	Chinese sleeper	Amur-Schläfergrundel	Not evaluated	
Family: Gobiidae
Aphia minuta	(Risso, 1810)	Transparent goby	Glasgrundel	Not evaluated	
Babka gymnotrachelus	(Kessler, 1857)	Racer goby	Nackthalsgrundel	Least concern	
Crystallogobius linearis	(Düben, 1845)	Crystal goby	Kristallgrundel	Not evaluated	
Gobius niger	Linnaeus, 1758	Black goby	Schwarzgrundel	Not evaluated	
Gobiusculus flavescens	(Fabricius, 1779)	Two-spotted goby	Zweifleckengrundel	Not evaluated	
Neogobius fluviatilis	(Pallas, 1814)	Monkey goby	Flussgrundel	Least concern	
Neogobius melanostomus	(Pallas, 1814)	Round goby	Schwarzgrundel	Least concern	
Pomatoschistus lozanoi	(de Buen, 1923)	Lozano's goby	Lozanos Grundel	Not evaluated	
Pomatoschistus microps	(Krøyer, 1838)	Common goby	Strandgrundel	Least concern	
Pomatoschistus minutus	(Pallas, 1770)	Sand goby	Sandgrundel	Not evaluated	
Pomatoschistus pictus	Malm, 1865	Painted goby	Fleckengrundel	Not evaluated	
Ponticola kessleri	(Günther, 1861)	Bighead goby	Kessler-Grundel	Least concern	
Proterorhinus semilunaris	(Heckel, 1837)	Western tubenose goby	Marmorierte Süßwassergrundel	Least concern	
Thorogobius ephippiatus	(Lowe, 1839)	Leopard-spotted goby	Leopardengrundel	Not evaluated	
Family: Labridae
Acantholabrus palloni	Risso, 1810	Scale-rayed wrasse	Schuppenflossen-Lippfisch	Least concern	
Centrolabrus exoletus	(Linnaeus, 1758)	Rock cook	Kleinmäuliger Lippfisch	Least concern	
Ctenolabrus rupestris	(Linnaeus, 1758)	Goldsinny wrasse	Klippenbarsch	Not evaluated	
Labrus bergylta	Ascanius, 1767	Ballan wrasse	Gefleckter Lippfisch	Least concern	
Labrus mixtus	Linnaeus, 1767	Cuckoo wrasse	Kuckuckslippfisch	Least concern	
Symphodus melops	(Linnaeus, 1758)	Corkwing wrasse	Goldmaid, Schwarzäugiger Lippfisch	Least concern	
Family: Mugilidae
Chelon labrosus	(Risso, 1827)	Thicklip grey mullet	Dicklippige Meeräsche	Not evaluated	
Liza aurata	(Risso, 1810)	Golden grey mullet	Gold-Meeräsche	Least concern	
Liza ramada	(Risso, 1810)	Thinlip mullet	Dünnlippige Meeräsche	Least concern	
Family: Carangidae
Trachinotus ovatus	(Linnaeus, 1758)	Pompano	Bläuel	Not evaluated	
Trachurus trachurus	(Linnaeus, 1758)	Atlantic horse mackerel	Bastardmakrele	Not evaluated	
Family: Centrarchidae
Lepomis auritus	(Linnaeus, 1758)	Redbreast sunfish	Rotbrust-Sonnenbarsch	Least concern	
Lepomis cyanellus	(Rafinesque, 1819)	Green sunfish	Grasbarsch	Not evaluated	
Lepomis gibbosus	(Linnaeus, 1758)	Pumpkinseed	Gemeiner Sonnenbarsch	Not evaluated	
Micropterus dolomieu	Lacépède, 1802	Smallmouth bass	Schwarzbarsch	Not evaluated	
Micropterus salmoides	(Lacépède, 1802)	Largemouth bass	Forellenbarsch	Not evaluated	
Family: Moronidae
Dicentrarchus labrax	(Linnaeus, 1758)	European seabass	Wolfsbarsch	Least concern	
Family: Mullidae
Mullus barbatus	Linnaeus, 1758	Red mullet	Rote Meerbarbe	Not evaluated	
Mullus surmuletus	Linnaeus, 1758	Surmullet	Rote Streifenbarbe	Not evaluated	
Family: Percidae
Gymnocephalus ambriaelacus	Geiger & Schliewen, 2010	Ammersee ruffe	Ammersee-Kaulbarsch	Critically endangered	
Gymnocephalus baloni	Holcík & Hensel, 1974	Balon's ruffe	Donau-Kaulbarsch	Least concern	
Gymnocephalus cernua	Linnaeus, 1758	Ruffe	Kaulbarsch	Least concern	
Gymnocephalus schraetser	Linnaeus, 1758	Schraetzer	Schrätzer	Least concern	
Perca fluviatilis	Linnaeus, 1758	European perch	Flussbarsch	Least concern	
Sander lucioperca	(Linnaeus, 1758)	Zander	Zander	Least concern	
Zingel streber	(Siebold, 1863)	Streber	Streber	Least concern	
Zingel zingel	Linnaeus, 1766	Common zingel	Zingel	Least concern	
Family: Pholidae
Pholis gunnellus	(Linnaeus, 1758)	Rock gunnel	Atlantischer Butterfisch	Not evaluated	
Family:Sciaenidae
Argyrosomus regius	Asso, 1801	Meagre	Adlerfisch, Umberfisch	Not evaluated	
Family: Sparidae
Boops boops	(Linnaeus, 1758)	Bogue	Gelbstriemenbrassex	Not evaluated	
Pagellus bogaraveo	(Brünnich, 1768)	Blackspot seabream	Rote Fleckbrasse	Not evaluated	
Spondyliosoma cantharus	(Linnaeus, 1758)	Black seabream	Streifenbrasse	Not evaluated	
Family:Scombridae
Katsuwonus pelamis	(Linnaeus, 1758)	Skipjack tuna	Echter Bonito	Least concern	
Orcynopsis unicolor	(Saint-Hilaire, 1817)	Plain bonito	Ungestreifter Pelamide	Least concern	
Sarda sarda	Bloch, 1793	Atlantic bonito	Pelamide	Least concern	
Scomber scombrus	Linnaeus, 1758	Atlantic mackerel	Makrele	Not evaluated	
Thunnus thynnus	(Linnaeus, 1758)	Atlantic bluefin tuna	Roter Thun	Endangered	
Family: Stichaeidae
Lumpenus lampretaeformis	(Walbaum, 1792)	Snakeblenny	Spitzschwanz-Schlangenstachelrücken	Not evaluated	
Chirolophis ascanii	(Walbaum, 1792)	Yarrell's blenny	Buschträger	Not evaluated	
Family:Xiphiidae
Xiphias gladius	Linnaeus, 1758	Swordfish	Schwertfisch	Least concern	
Family: Ammodytidae
Ammodytes marinus	(Raitt, 1934)	Raitt's sand eel	Kleiner Sandaal	Not evaluated	
Ammodytes tobianus	Linnaeus, 1758	Lesser sand eel	Tobiasfisch	Not evaluated	
Gymnammodytes semisquamatus	Jourdain, 1879	Smooth sandeel	Nacktsandaal	Not evaluated	
Hyperoplus immaculatus	(Corbin, 1950)	Greater sand-eel	Ungefleckter Großer Sandaal	Not evaluated	
Hyperoplus lanceolatus	(Sauvage, 1824)	Great sand eel	Gefleckter Großer Sandaal	Not evaluated	
Family:Trachinidae
Echiichthys vipera	(Cuvier, 1829)	Lesser weever	Viperqueise	Not evaluated	
Trachinus draco	Linnaeus, 1758	Greater weever	Gewöhnliches Petermännchen	Not evaluated	
Family: Zoarcidae
Zoarces viviparus	(Linnaeus, 1758)	Viviparous eelpout	Aalmutter	Not evaluated	
