= Malmgren =

Malmgren family tombstone, Located in Canton IL

Malmgren is a Swedish ornamental surname composed of the elements malm 'ore' + gren 'branch'.

== People ==
- Anders Johan Malmgren (1834–1897), Finnish zoologist and botanist
- Arthur Leopold Malmgren (1860–1947), Russian Lutheran bishop, doctor of theology
- Axel Malmgren (1857–1901), Swedish artist
- Björn A. Malmgren, Marine geologist associated with the Punctuated gradualism hypothesis
- Dick Malmgren (?–1992), Artist and writer for Archie Comics
- Ernfrid Malmgren (1899–1970), Swedish professor and president of the Universal Esperanto Association (UEA).
- Eugen Malmgren (1876–1941), Swedish born musician, cellist in St. Petersburg, Russia
- Finn Malmgren (1895–1928), Swedish meteorologist and Arctic explorer
- Harald Malmgren (1935–2025), American scholar, diplomat and international negotiator
- Jarl Malmgren (1908–1942), Finnish footballer
- Jens-Ole "Ole" Malmgren (born 1946), Danish composer
- Johan Malmgren, Keyboardist in Swedish bands Elegant Machinery, and S.P.O.C.K
- Jonna Malmgren, Swedish freestyle wrestler
- Judy Malmgren, Australian Television producer and writer
- Karl G. Malmgren (1862–1921), Swedish-born Spokane-based architect
- Knut Malmgren, Swedish National Badminton Championships player during 1940s and 1950s
- Michael Malmgren, Bass player and member of Swedish jazz band Bo Kaspers Orkester
- Peter Malmgren (born 1971), Swedish golfer
- Philippa "Pippa" Malmgren (born 1962), International politics and policy expert
- Robin Malmgren, Vocalist for Swedish metal band Allt
- Russell Malmgren (1905–1982), American sound engineer
- Ture Malmgren (1851–1922), Swedish journalist, book publisher, and municipal politician. Creator of Tureborg Castle
- Ulrika Malmgren (born 1960), Swedish actress and radio presenter
- Yat Malmgren (1916–2002), Swedish dancer and acting teacher

== Places ==
- Finn Malmgren Fjord, a fjord in Orvin Land at Nordaustlandet, Svalbard. Named for Finn Malmgren
- Jack Malmgren Memorial Skate Park, located within Posse Grounds Park in Sedona, AZ
- Malmgren Bay, located on Renaud Island in the Biscoe Islands of Antarctica. Named for Finn Malmgren
- Malmgren Lake, a 29 acre lake located in Grant_County,_Minnesota
- Malmgren, Saskatchewan, Canada
- Malmgren Island, also known as Malmgrenoya or Malmgrenøya, island in Svalbard, Norway
- Tomb of Ture Malmgren, unused grave of Ture Malmgren

== Biological Eponyms ==
Sminthurides malmgreni, commonly known as Malmgren's springtail, a species of puddle springtail likely named for Anders Johan Malmgren

== Other uses ==
- Cutter & Malmgren, Architecture firm that designed multiple buildings listed on the U.S. National Register of Historic Places
- Malmgren Mfg., Former farm implement manufacturing company based in Saint Boniface, Winnipeg
- Malmgren Racing
