= Rutherford v Secretary of State for Trade and Industry =

2006 British labour law case

- Court: House of Lords
- Full case name: Rutherford v Secretary of State for Trade and Industry or Harvest Towncircle Ltd
- Decided: 3 May 2006
- Citation: [2006] UKHL 19

Case history
- Prior action: [2005] ICR 119

Court membership
- Judges sitting: Lord Nicholls of Birkenhead, Lord Scott of Foscote, Lord Rodger of Earlsferry, Lord Walker of Gestingthorpe and Baroness Hale of Richmond

Keywords
- Indirect discrimination

Rutherford v Secretary of State for Trade and Industry [2006] UKHL 19 is a UK labour law case concerning sex and age discrimination. It also contains the test for indirect discrimination, based on statistical comparisons.

== Facts ==
Mr Rutherford claimed that, because over 65 years old 7.6% of men and only 3.4% of women were economically active, the Employment Rights Act 1996 sections 109 and 156, which removed unfair dismissal and redundancy for over 65s, were discriminatory on grounds of sex. He argued this limit breached the TFEU article 157 (formerly article 141) because it indirectly discriminated against men.

The Tribunal held that there was discrimination. The Employment Appeal Tribunal allowed the employer's appeal and remitted the question to a tribunal. Again the tribunal found there was discrimination. The Employment Appeal Tribunal again allowed the appeal.

== Judgment ==
=== Court of Appeal ===
Mummery LJ held the Tribunal had erred in selecting its pool for comparison, because it should have followed R (Seymour-Smith) v Secretary of State for Employment [2000] ICR 244. In this case the ECJ and the House of Lords said the method for comparison was, (a) take the pool as the entire workforce to whom the age limit is applicable; (b) find the number of men under 65 who are advantaged and disadvantaged; (c) find the number of women who are advantaged and disadvantaged (d) compare whether the number of advantaged men is smaller.

He pointed out a difference between looking at who can comply and who cannot comply. It might be that 99.5% of men and 99% of women can comply. It is also that 1% of women and 0.5% of men cannot comply. But focus on the latter means that you can say twice as many women cannot comply. That is misleading.

=== House of Lords ===
The House of Lords held that ERA 1996 sections 109 and 156 did not have a significant enough adverse impact to be discriminatory. Within the group who were not adversely affected (98.8%) there was virtually no difference. It was men to women 1 to 1.0004 while the ratio of men to women who were adversely affected was 1.44 to 1. That was not enough either. Just because more women than men worked beyond 65 did not mean there was discrimination against men, because the difference was purely based on age.

The correct approach is to look at the advantaged group, rather than the disadvantaged, though R (Seymour-Smith) v Secretary of State for Employment left open a ‘disadvantage-led approach’. In some cases it could be an alert for discrimination, but in this situation with the 1 to 1.44 ratio, it was not significant enough. So the Tribunal erred in totally ignoring the effect of an ‘advantage led approach’.

== See also ==
- UK labour law
- Unfair dismissal
