= R v Secretary of State for Employment, ex p Seymour-Smith =

2000 House of Lords employment law case

R (Seymour Smith) v SS for Employment
- Court: House of Lords, European Court of Justice
- Full case name: R v Secretary of State for Employment, ex parte Seymour-Smith and Perez
- Citation: [2000] UKHL 12

Case history
- Prior actions: (1999) C-167/97 (ECJ), [1997] UKHL 11 (HL), [1995] IRLR 464 (CA) and [1994] IRLR 448 (HC)

Case opinions
- Lord Slynn, Lord Goff, Lord Jauncey, Lord Nicholls and Lord Steyn

Keywords
- Two year qualifying period, unfair dismissal, indirect discrimination

R (Seymour-Smith) v Secretary of State for Employment [2000] UKHL 12 and (1999) C-167/97 is a landmark case in United Kingdom labour law and European labour law on the qualifying period of work before an employee accrues unfair dismissal rights. It was held by the House of Lords and the European Court of Justice that a two-year qualifying period had a disparate impact on women given that significantly fewer women worked long enough to be protected by the unfair dismissal law, but that the government could, at that point in the 1990s, succeed in an objective justification of increasing recruitment by employers.

== Facts ==
Ms Nicole Seymour-Smith and Ms Perez had made a claim against the Secretary of State for Employment that the United Kingdom's qualifying period of two years for unfair dismissal constituted indirect discrimination against women under the Treaty of the European Union, article 119 (now TFEU art 157) and the Equal Treatment Directive 76/207/EEC. Ms Seymour-Smith was dismissed after less than a year's work in 1991 for Christo & Co, and Ms Perez had similarly claimed unfair dismissal after losing her job at Matthew Stone Restoration. Statistically fewer women had long enough periods of service as men to accrue the protection of unfair dismissal law, for data collected between 1985 and 1991 when Ms Seymour-Smith was working. (There was evidence that after that time the gap had been starting to narrow.) The UK qualifying period resulted from the Unfair Dismissal (Variation of Qualifying Period) Order 1985, which had raised the qualifying period for all employees from its original period of one year under the Employment Protection (Consolidation) Act 1978 section 64(1).

Elias QC represented the government and Allen QC represented the employees. Before the conclusion of the litigation, in 1999, the newly elected Labour government reduced the qualifying period for unfair dismissal from two years to one year, currently found in the Employment Rights Act 1996 section 108.

== Judgment ==
=== Court of Appeal ===
The Court of Appeal held that under the Equal Treatment Directive, a two-year qualifying period for unfair dismissal was indirectly discriminatory, and the Secretary of State for Employment had failed to prove that there was an objective justification for the disparate impact. However, it was unclear that compensation for unfair dismissal was "pay" within the meaning of the Treaty of the European Community, article 119, and so it was unable to grant relief. The Secretary of State appealed.

=== House of Lords ===
Lord Hoffmann, giving judgment for the whole House, said that while it was clear that under the Directive, which had only "vertical direct effect" and could be enforceable only against the state, the Treaty article 119 had "horizontal direct effect" and thus created a right of enforcement between private parties. Nevertheless, as in the Court of Appeal it was unclear what the European position was on a number of points. Hence a reference was made to the European Court of Justice asking (1) whether unfair dismissal compensation was "pay" under article 119 (2) whether unfair dismissal fell within the scope of article 119 (3) what the legal test should be for establishing a disparate impact was (4) when a state's action is at issue which time is relevant between when a measure is adopted, brought into force or when an employee is dismissed, and (5) what are the criteria for objective justification?

=== European Court of Justice ===
The ECJ responded that unfair dismissal compensation did constitute pay under TEC article 119, and that unfair dismissal legislation therefore fell within the ambit of EU measures on discrimination. The test for disparate impact would be borne out by evidence, including statistics and the relevant time was whether a "lesser but persistent and relatively constant disparity" would exist. On the question of objective justification, the ECJ held the following.

70. In this case, the United Kingdom Government contends that the risk that the exposure of employers to proceedings for unfair dismissal brought by employees who had only fairly recently been engaged is a deterrent to recruitment, so that extension of the qualifying period for protection against dismissal would stimulate recruitment.

71. It cannot be disputed that the encouragement of recruitment constitutes a legitimate aim of social policy.

72. It must also be ascertained, in the light of all the relevant factors and taking into account the possibility of achieving the social policy aim in question by other means, whether such an aim appears to be unrelated to any discrimination based on sex and whether the disputed rule, as a means to its achievement, is capable of advancing that aim.

73. In that connection, the United Kingdom Government maintains that a Member State should merely have to show that it was reasonably entitled to consider that the measure would advance a social policy aim. It relies to that end on Case C-317/93 Nolte [1995] ECR I-4625.

74. It is true that in paragraph 33 of the Nolte case the Court observed that, in choosing the measures capable of achieving the aims of their social and employment policy, the Member States have a broad margin of discretion.

75. However, although social policy is essentially a matter for the Member States under Community law as it stands, the fact remains that the broad margin of discretion available to the Member States in that connection cannot have the effect of frustrating the implementation of a fundamental principle of Community law such as that of equal pay for men and women.

76. Mere generalisations concerning the capacity of a specific measure to encourage recruitment are not enough to show that the aim of the disputed rule is unrelated to any discrimination based on sex nor to provide evidence on the basis of which it could reasonably be considered that the means chosen were suitable for achieving that aim.

77. Accordingly, the answer to the fifth question must be that if a considerably smaller percentage of women than men is capable of fulfilling the requirement of two years' employment imposed by the disputed rule, it is for the Member State, as the author of the allegedly discriminatory rule, to show that the said rule reflects a legitimate aim of its social policy, that that aim is unrelated to any discrimination based on sex, and that it could reasonably consider that the means chosen were suitable for attaining that aim.

=== House of Lords ===
The House of Lords held by a majority of three to two that the extension of the qualifying period in 1985 had had a considerable disparate impact on women. Lord Nicholls, Lord Goff and Lord Jauncey reached this conclusion in agreement with the Court of Appeal by comparing the number of women that did qualify for unfair dismissal protection the number who did not, and then assessing whether the disparity was significant. Lord Slynn and Lord Steyn dissented from this conclusion on the ground that it was for the national court to assess the effect and that on the facts the statistics were not significant enough.

However, the majority of their Lordships were agreed that there had been a sufficient objective justification by the government, namely encouraging recruitment by employers, to pass the 1985 Order. This resulted from the broad margin of discretion that governments had to implement social policy to achieve a legitimate aim. Yet it was emphasised that experience may change whether a measure is objectively justified. Lord Nicholls concluded in the following way.

This question raises an issue of fact, to be decided on the basis of the extensive documentary evidence adduced by the parties. The Secretary of State relied on several reports. These are itemised in the judgment of Balcombe L.J. at [1995] ICR 907F-H. One report, 'Burdens on Business', was published by the Department of Trade and Industry in March 1985. This report identified, as one of the available options, increasing employees' qualifying periods in unfair dismissal cases from one year to two years in firms employing more than twenty employees:

'Our field work confirmed that the present one year period is too short for many smaller businesses, and is distorting dismissal decisions.'

This is the high watermark of the Secretary of State's evidence. I think it is fair to say that overall, echoing the words of Balcombe L.J., these reports indicated that various small percentages of employers considered that employment protection legislation in general, and the provisions relating to unfair dismissal in particular, might inhibit the recruitment of employees.

On balance, I consider the Secretary of State discharged the burden of showing his view was reasonable. It is apparent that obtaining hard evidence, including evidence of employer perceptions, is essentially a difficult task in this field. But this is not a case of a mere generalised assumption, as occurred in Rinner-Kühn v FWW Spezial-Gebäudereinigung GmbH & Co KG (Case 171/88) [1989] ECR 2743. Here, there was some supporting factual evidence. To condemn the minister for failing to carry out further research or prepare an impact analysis, as recommended in 'Burdens on Business', would be unreasonable.

Objective justification: the continuing operation of the 1985 Order

The requirements of Community law must be complied with at all relevant times. A measure may satisfy Community law when adopted, because at that stage the minister was reasonably entitled to consider the measure was a suitable means for achieving a legitimate aim. But experience of the working of the measure may tell a different story. In course of time the measure may be found to be unsuited for its intended purpose. The benefits hoped for may not materialise. Then the retention in force of a measure having a disparately adverse impact on women may no longer be objectively justifiable. In such a case a measure, lawful when adopted, may become unlawful.

Accordingly, if the government introduces a measure which proves to have a disparately adverse impact on women, the government is under a duty to take reasonable steps to monitor the working of the measure. The government must review the position periodically. The greater the disparity of impact, the greater the diligence which can reasonably be expected of the government. Depending on the circumstances, the government may become obliged to repeal or replace the unsuccessful measure.

In the present case the 1985 Order had been in operation for six years when the two claimants were dismissed from their jobs. The Divisional Court and the Court of Appeal noted there was no evidence that the extension of the qualifying period in 1985 led to an increase in employment opportunities. Ought the government to have taken steps to repeal the 1985 Order before 1991? In other words, had the Order, lawful at its inception, become unlawful by 1991?

Here again, the matter is debatable. As time passed, the persistently adverse impact on women became apparent. But, as with the broad margin of discretion afforded to governments when adopting measures of this type, so with the duty of governments to monitor the implementation of such measures: the practicalities of government must be borne in mind. The benefits of the 1985 Order could not be expected to materialise overnight, or even in a matter of months. The government was entitled to allow a reasonable period to elapse before deciding whether the Order had achieved its objective and, if not, whether the Order should be replaced with some other measure or simply repealed. Time would then be needed to implement any decision. I do not think the government could reasonably be expected to complete all these steps in six years, failing which it was in breach of Community law. The contrary view would impose an unrealistic burden on the government in the present case. Accordingly I consider the Secretary of State discharged the burden of showing that the 1985 Order was still objectively justified in 1991.

== Significance ==
Seymour-Smith tested the impact that legislation for equality had on other provisions of national law, and came to the conclusion that member states should have a broad discretion in the kinds of social policies they pursue, but that their reasoning process was subject to review by the European Court of Justice, as was the quality of evidence provided, and that in any event no social policy could contravene the principle of equal treatment. The House of Lords affirmed this in holding that while there may have been objective justification in 1991 still for a two-year qualifying period, experience of such measures could call for a different assessment at a later point in time, and a government would have to keep the issue under review.

Disparate impact of 1985 dismissal law
	Men working under 2 years	Women working under 2 years	Men working over 2 years	Women working over 2 years	Disparity
1985	22.6%	31%	77.4%	68.9%	8.5%
1986	22.9	31.6	77.2	68.4	8.8
1987	24.7	32.9	75.3	67.1	8.2
1988	26.6	34.5	73.4	65.6	7.8
1989	28	36.2	72	63.8	8.2
1990	27.6	35.8	72.5	64.1	8.4
1991	25.5	32.6	74.5	67.4	7.1
1992	22.1	27.9	77.9	72.1	5.8
1993	21.6	25.9	78.4	74.1	4.3

== See also ==
- United Kingdom labour law
