= Cryptocarya massoy =

Conservation status
- Near Threatened (IUCN 3.1)

Scientific classification
- Kingdom: Plantae
- Clade: Embryophytes
- Clade: Tracheophytes
- Clade: Spermatophytes
- Clade: Angiosperms
- Clade: Magnoliids
- Order: Laurales
- Family: Lauraceae
- Genus: Cryptocarya
- Species: C. massoy

Binomial name
- Cryptocarya massoy Lorenz Oken

Species of tree native to New Guinea

Cryptocarya massoy (also simply massoy or massoi) is a tree native to New Guinea. Its bark was traded across the Indonesian archipelago.
