= Schillinger =

Schillinger is a surname. Notable people with the surname include:

- Andreas Schillinger (born 1983), German cyclist
- Andy Schillinger (born 1964), American football player
- Dean Schillinger (active from 1991), American physician
- Gabriel Schillinger (born 1989), American entrepreneur
- Jerry Schillinger (active from 2021), American politician
- Josef Schillinger (1908–1943), SS officer, killed by Polish Jew Franceska Mann at Auschwitz concentration camp during the Holocaust
- Joseph Schillinger (1895–1943), Ukrainian-American composer, music theorist, and composition teacher
  - Schillinger House of Music, within Berklee College of Music
  - Schillinger System, a mathematical method of music composition
- Patricia Schillinger (born 1963), French politician
- Shann Schillinger (born 1986), American college football coach and former player
- Ulrich Schillinger (born 1945), German cyclist

== Characters on the HBO show Oz ==
- Andrew Schillinger
- Hank Schillinger
- Vernon Schillinger

== See also ==
- Schillinger v. United States, a Supreme Court decision relating to patent law
