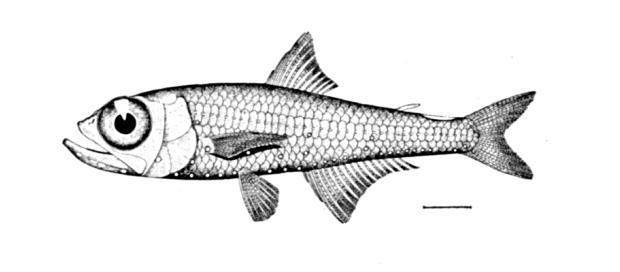
- Benoit's lanternfish (H. benoiti)
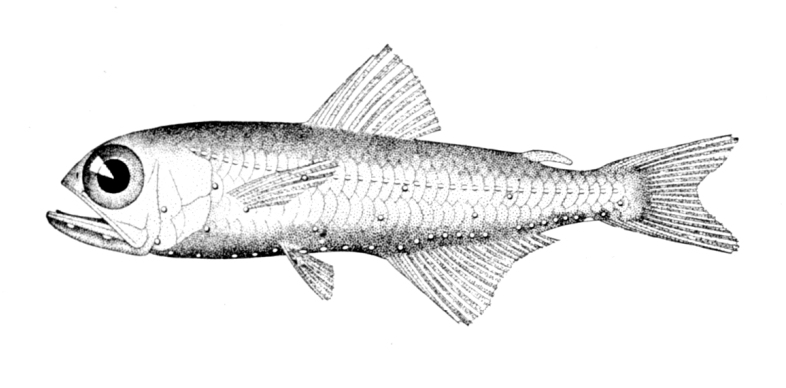
- Bermuda lanternfish (H. hygomii)

Scientific classification
- Domain: Eukaryota
- Kingdom: Animalia
- Phylum: Chordata
- Class: Actinopterygii
- Order: Myctophiformes
- Family: Myctophidae
- Genus: Hygophum; Bolin, 1939

= Hygophum =

Genus of fishes

Hygophum is a genus of lanternfishes.

== Species ==
There are currently nine recognized species in this genus:

- Hygophum atratum (Garman, 1899) (Thickhead lanternfish)
- Hygophum benoiti (Cocco, 1838) (Benoit's lanternfish)
- Hygophum bruuni Wisner, 1971
- Hygophum hanseni (Tåning, 1932) (Hansen's lanternfish)
- Hygophum hygomii (Lütken, 1892) (Bermuda lantern fish)
- Hygophum macrochir (Günther, 1864) (Large-finned lanternfish)
- Hygophum proximum Becker, 1965 (Firefly lanternfish)
- Hygophum reinhardtii (Lütken, 1892) (Reinhardt's lantern fish)
- Hygophum taaningi Becker, 1965
