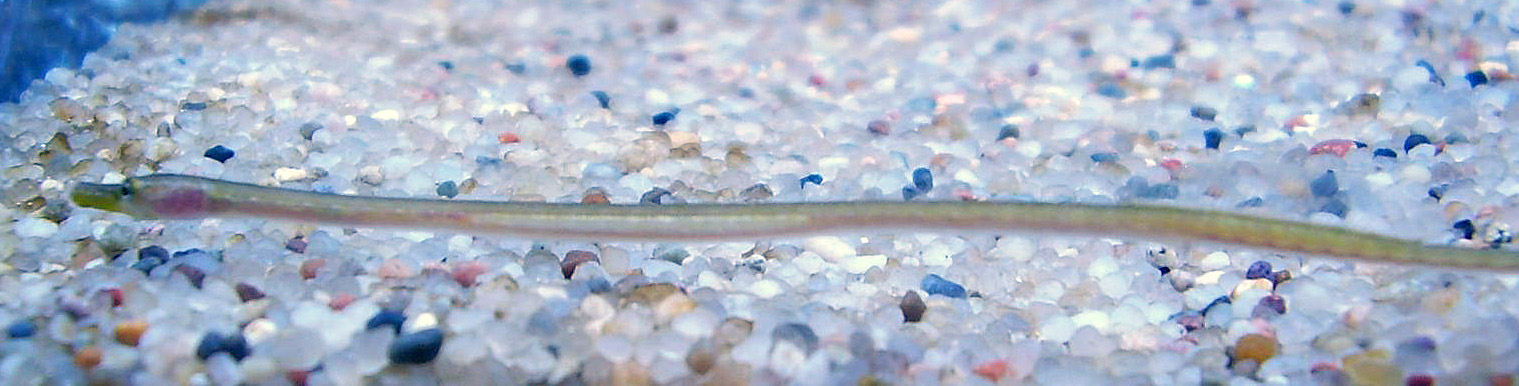
- Nerophis ophidion

Scientific classification
- Domain: Eukaryota
- Kingdom: Animalia
- Phylum: Chordata
- Class: Actinopterygii
- Order: Syngnathiformes
- Family: Syngnathidae
- Subfamily: Syngnathinae
- Genus: Nerophis; Rafinesque, 1810

Type species
- Syngnathus ophidion Linnaeus, 1758

Synonyms
- Nematosoma Eichwald, 1831: Osphyolax Cope, 1876; Scyphius Risso, 1827

= Nerophis =

Genus of fishes

Nerophis is a genus of pipefishes native to the eastern Atlantic Ocean.

== Species ==
There are currently three recognized species in this genus:

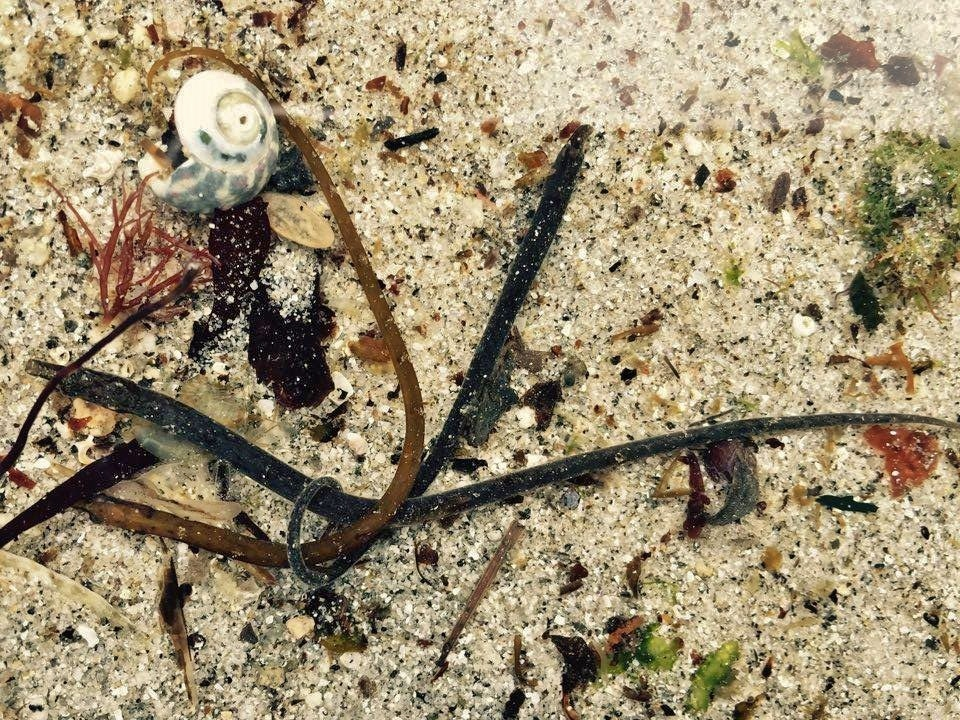
Nerophis lumbriciformis

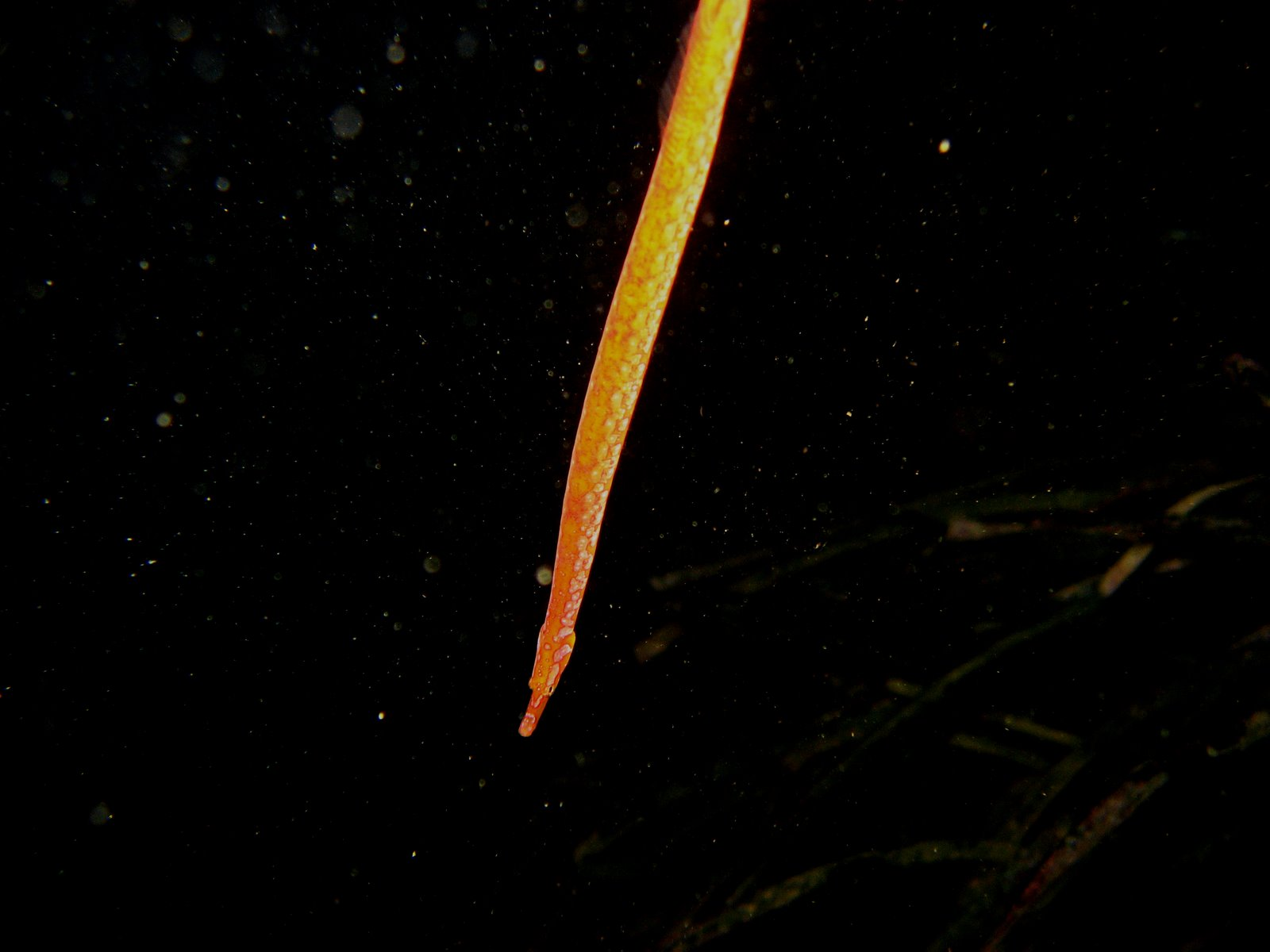
Nerophis maculatus

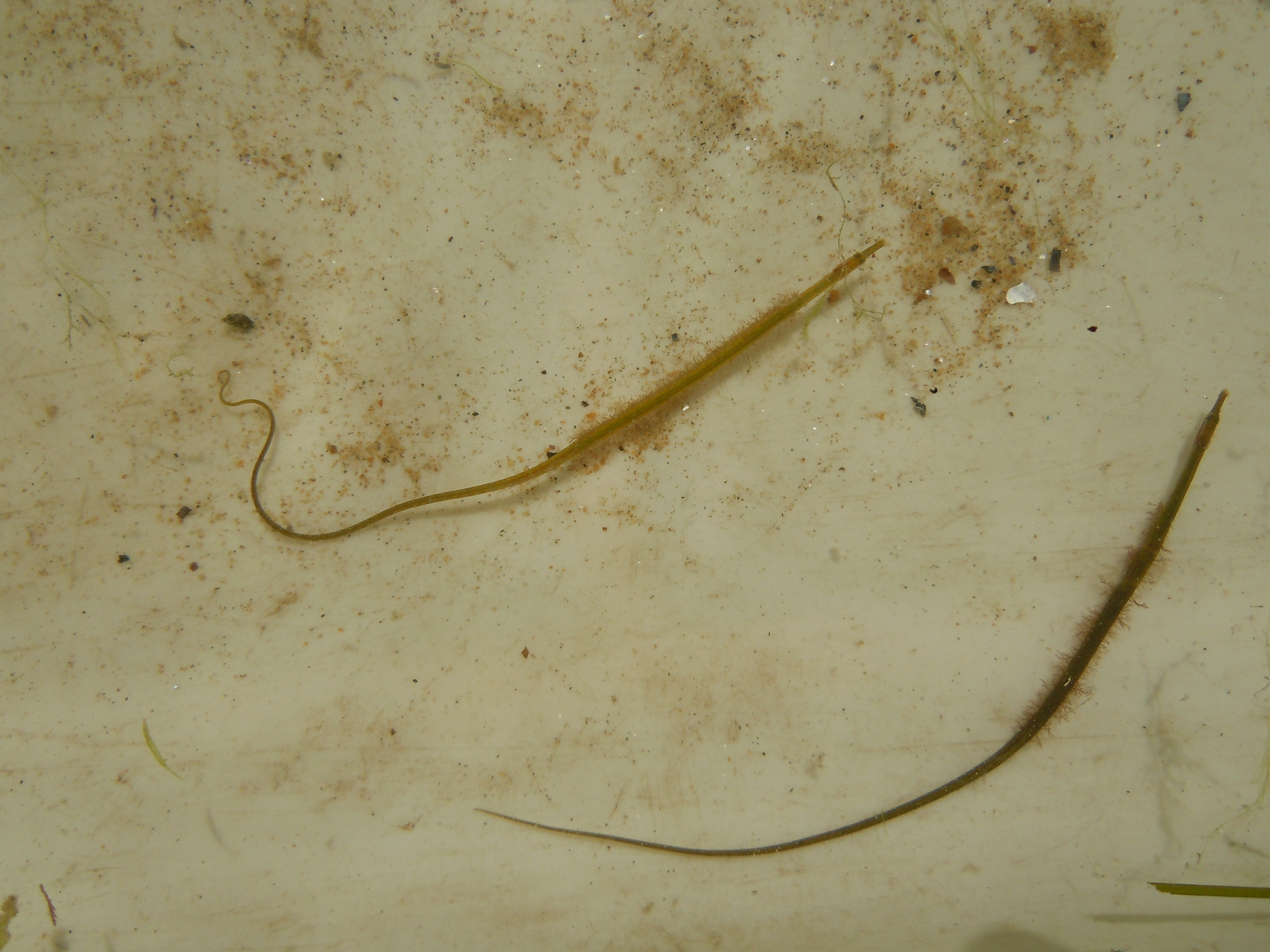
Nerophis ophidion
