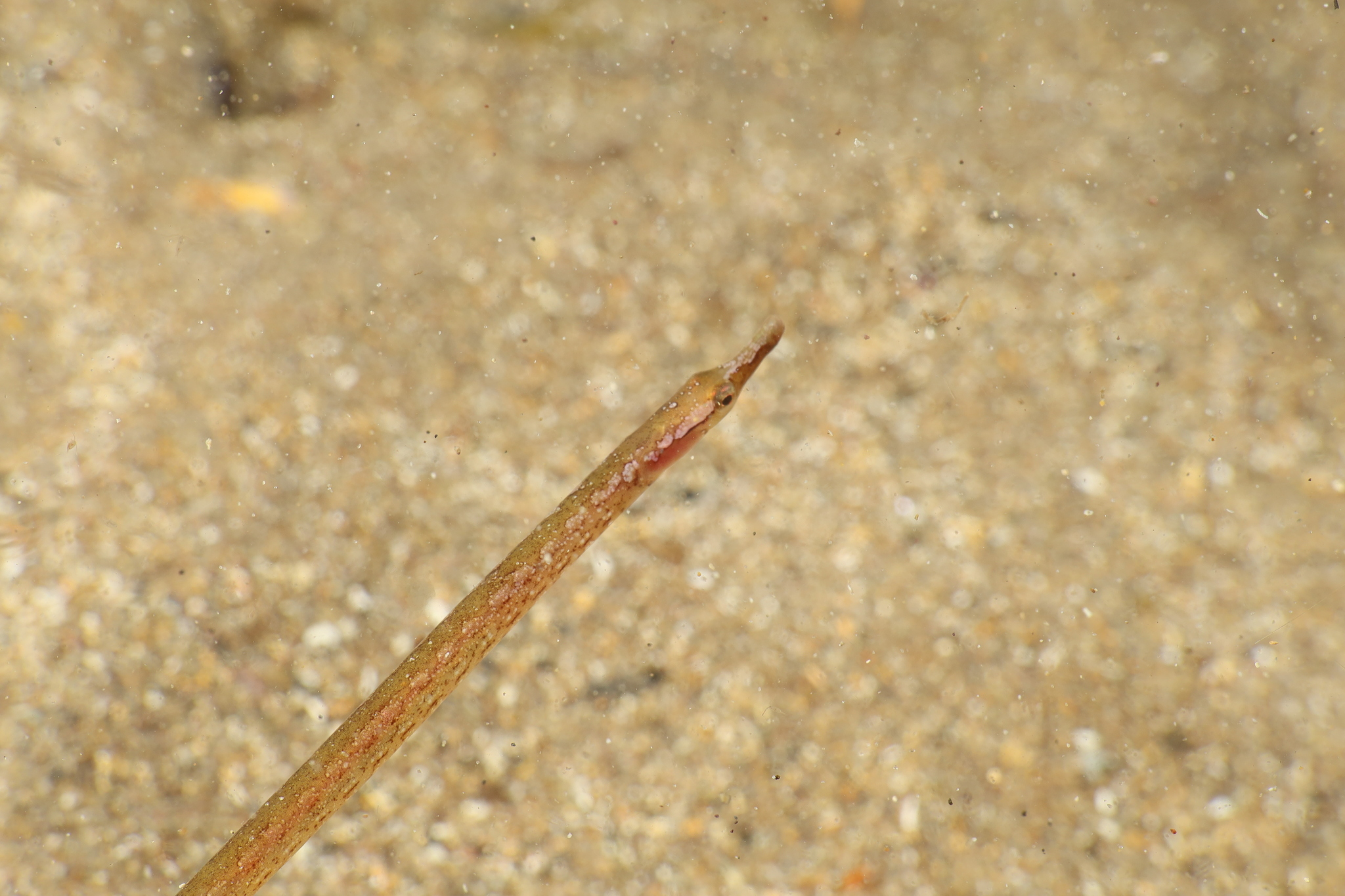

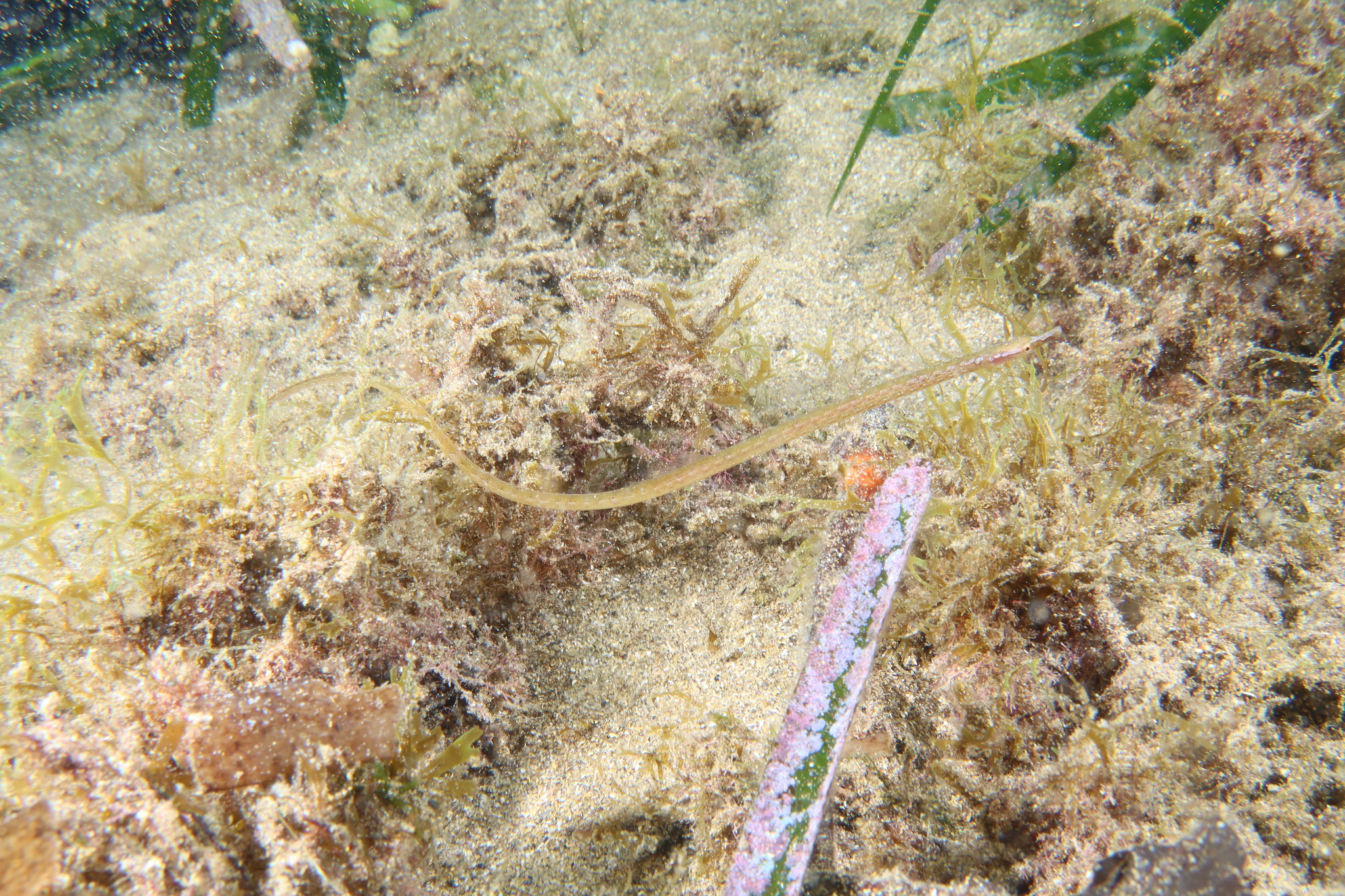

Conservation status
- Data Deficient (IUCN 3.1)

Scientific classification
- Kingdom: Animalia
- Phylum: Chordata
- Class: Actinopterygii
- Order: Syngnathiformes
- Family: Syngnathidae
- Genus: Nerophis
- Species: N. maculatus

Binomial name
- Nerophis maculatus Rafinesque, 1810

Synonyms
- Nerophis annulatus (Risso, 1827); Scyphius annulatus Risso, 1827; Syngnathus fasciatus Risso, 1810; Syngnathus papacinus Risso, 1810

= Spotted pipefish =

Species of fish

The spotted pipefish, Nerophis maculatus, is a species of Pipefishes, found in the Eastern Atlantic: Portugal and Azores, Mediterranean Sea, especially numerous in its western part and the Adriatic Sea. Ovoviviparous, marine subtropical coastal fish up to 15 centimetres (5.9 in) maximal length. It is inhabits rocky sites of coast, also in aquatic plants and algae, at depth up to 50 metres (160 ft).
