= Gymnocephalus ambriaelacus =

Conservation status
- Least Concern (IUCN 3.1)

Scientific classification
- Kingdom: Animalia
- Phylum: Chordata
- Class: Actinopterygii
- Order: Perciformes
- Family: Percidae
- Genus: Gymnocephalus
- Species: G. ambriaelacus

Binomial name
- Gymnocephalus ambriaelacus Geiger & Schliewen, 2010

Species of fish

Gymnocephalus ambriaelacus, the Ammer ruffe, is a species of freshwater ray-finned fish, a ruffe, from the family Percidae which is endemic to Lake Ammer, in the upper Danube basin in southern Germany. This species can reach a maximum length of 11.7 centimetres (4.6 in) (SL).

== Taxonomy ==
The existence of ruffe in Lake Ammer has been known to local fisherman for at least 200 years and to scientists for over 100 years. These ruffe were thought to be Gymnocephalus cernua or as G. baloni, but were not convincingly assigned to either species. In 2010, the Ammer ruffe was described as a new species, Gymnocephalus ambriaelacus, by the German ichthyologists Matthias Geiger and Ulrich Schliewen based on a specimen collected from the lake in 2005. The species was named after the historical Latin name of the lake it inhabits, Ambriae Lacus.

Some authorities suggest that this taxon may be synonymous with the Balon's ruffe (G. baloni).

== Description ==
The Ammer ruffe is mostly silvery-grey with dark-black blotches on the flanks that have a greenish-bronze shine. The dorsal fin is transparent, with dark spots along the base and lateral line, and yellow tips to the spine and black tips to the membrane. The rays of the dorsal fin are yellowish with black markings. The pectoral fins are transparent yellowish-white, with black spots spread evenly all over. The pelvic and anal fins are whitish and slightly cloudy, not completely transparent. The pelvic fin has small black spots concentrated on the rays, while the anal fin has irregularly distributed spots on the rays, membranes, and spines, densest on the rays. The caudal fin is nearly transparent, with yellowish rays and small black spots forming transverse bands.

== Distribution and habitat ==
The Ammer ruffe is endemic to the freshwater Lake Ammer in the upper Danube basin of Bavaria, Germany. The lake was formed during the last glacial period and is naturally oligotrophic, although it is currently mesotrophic in the 21st century.

== Ecology ==
Females collected in May spawned immediately in captivity, laying small eggs around in a millimetre in width. The eggs were weakly adhesive and some even floated. Juveniles of the species grow slowly compared to others in the genus, reaching lengths of around 4.5 cm after one year and 8 cm after two years.

== Conservation ==
The Ammer ruffe is listed as being of least concern on the IUCN Red List. Although it is native to a single lake, it does not seem to face any major threats and there is no available data on its population to justify a more threatened status. The species may be threatened by interbreeding with the invasive Eurasian ruffe.

Ammer Lake was eutrophic from the 1950s to the 1990s due to intense pollution, but recovered and became more oligotrophic after the 1970s due to a series of measures to improve water quality in the lake, including better drainage and wastewater treatment near the lake. Since around 1990, the lake has seen the occurrence of annual cyanobacterial blooms, whose effects on the ruffe are unknown.

The Ammer ruffe is listed in Annex II of the Habitats Directive and Appendix III of the Bern Convention. Lake Ammer is a Ramsar site and protected as part of the Natura 2000 network.
