= Harald Malmgren =

American trade negotiator (1935–2025)

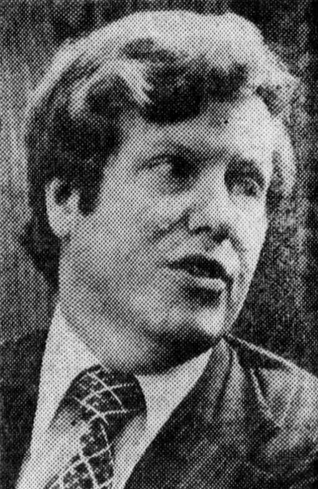
- Malmgren c. 1974
- Born: July 13, 1935; Boston, Massachusetts, U.S.
- Died: February 13, 2025 (aged 89); Warrenton, Virginia, U.S.
- Occupations: Lecturer; US trade advisor; Lobbyist
- Children: 6, including Pippa

Academic background
- Education: Yale University; Nuffield College, Oxford
- Thesis: Information, expectations, and the nature of the firm (1961)
- Doctoral advisor: John Hicks; Ian Little

Harald Bernard Malmgren (July 13, 1935 – February 13, 2025) was an American economist, writer, lobbyist, and trade negotiator. In the 1960s and 1970s, he worked for the United States government, including in the Office of the United States Trade Representative, where he focused on negotiations relating to the General Agreement on Tariffs and Trade (GATT).

While working on a DPhil at the University of Oxford in the early 1960s, Malmgren published a pioneering article in organizational economics. After leaving Oxford, Malmgren conducted research into non-tariff barriers to trade and published two books outlining his belief that trade agreements could be an important tool in foreign affairs. From 1972 to 1975 he was a deputy special representative for trade negotiations, holding the rank of ambassador and primarily working on the GATT. After leaving the government, Malmgren worked as a lobbyist for Japanese business interests, who paid high fees for his work.

Throughout his life, Malmgren was both opaque and self-aggrandizing about his work, concealing his financial interests in certain matters, while frequently embellishing and fabricating autobiographical claims related to his political connections and government service.

== Early life and education ==
Harald Malmgren was born in Boston, Massachusetts on July 13, 1935, to Swedish immigrants Berndt Birger Malmgren and Magda Malmgren (née Nilsson). He spent a year at Rensselaer Polytechnic Institute before transferring to Yale University. He earned an undergraduate degree in economics from Yale in 1957, summa cum laude. While at Yale, Malmgren worked as a research assistant to Thomas Schelling, who encouraged him to go to Oxford University for his doctorate of philosophy. From 1957 to 1959 Malmgren had a fellowship from the Woodrow Wilson National Fellowship Foundation, allowing him to do research at Harvard University. In October 1957, he matriculated as a DPhil student at The Queen's College, Oxford. His thesis was initially to be on "the concept of an industrial process," supervised by Philip Andrews. By 1960, Malmgren had transferred to Nuffield College, and by July 1961 he had submitted his DPhil thesis. His supervisors were John Hicks and Ian Little. Malmgren received a DPhil from Nuffield in February 1962.

While at Oxford, Malmgren published the article "Information, expectations, and the theory of the firm" in The Quarterly Journal of Economics. In 1996, the scholar Nicolai J. Foss wrote that the article was "a strikingly original paper that, had it been duly recognized, could have changed the course of the theory of economic organization", arguing that it anticipated later developments in the theory of the firm and "complementarities between stocks of knowledge."

== Career ==
=== Initial government service (1962–1969) ===
Malmgren lectured at Cornell University, where in 1962 he was an assistant professor of economics. Malmgren moved to Washington, D.C., in mid-1962. Initially Malmgren worked for the Institute for Defense Analyses. He moved to the office of the United States Trade Representative (USTR) in 1964 during the presidency of Lyndon B. Johnson, where he was a senior economic advisor. That year he also taught at Georgetown University. In 1965, Malmgren was hired as an adjunct professor at Johns Hopkins University's School of Advanced International Studies. He would hold that post until 1971.

In early 1967 he was involved in the final set of negotiations during the Kennedy Round of work towards the General Agreement on Tariffs and Trade (GATT). Malmgren worked on mathematical analysis aimed at predicting the impact of lessening tariffs on the American economy. Economist Francis M. Bator used the numbers that Malmgren generated to conclude that the trade agreement would negatively impact American trade surpluses, but that signing an agreement was still in the US's best interest. Johnson agreed, and approved an agreement. That summer Malmgren led an American delegation in negotiations over the International Grains Agreement.

Malmgren left the USTR's office after Carl J. Gilbert became trade representative in 1969—the two reportedly had a "falling out". By this point he was the director of operations for the department. According to scholar Steve Dryden, some of the USTR workers "found Malmgren too self important and not that much of a team player, [and] wished he would stay away from the office for good" though some noted enjoyment of Malmgren's habit of "spinning stories that highlighted his own role in the matter at hand".

=== Departure (1969–1972) ===
After this Malmgren traveled around the world, particularly to Europe, studying non-tariff barriers to trade. He was also a senior fellow at the Overseas Development Council (ODC).

By late 1970 he was working in London with William R. Pearce, a lobbyist who worked for Cargill, with Dryden writing that Malmgren also "it seemed, advis[ed] half the Nixon administration and Congress on trade policy." Around this time, Malmgren worked with William Denman Eberle on a trade study. When Eberle was named trade representative in late 1971, Malmgren became involved again with the office and recommended that Pearce be hired to fill the empty role of trade deputy. That year Malmgren also founded "Malmgren, Inc.", a lobbying company active in Washington, D.C.

While away from the government, Malmgren's research projects included several published works. He edited the 1972 book Pacific Basin Development: The American Interests, for the ODC. That year he also wrote the book International Economic Peacekeeping in Phase II, sponsored by the Atlantic Council of the United States. A revised and slightly expanded version would be published in 1973. Dryden writes that International Economic Peacekeeping laid out the USTR's agenda for future trade negotiations. Malmgren felt that economic power, and particularly trade agreements, could become what Dryden calls "the dynamic force" in international affairs.

=== Return to USTR (1972–1975) ===
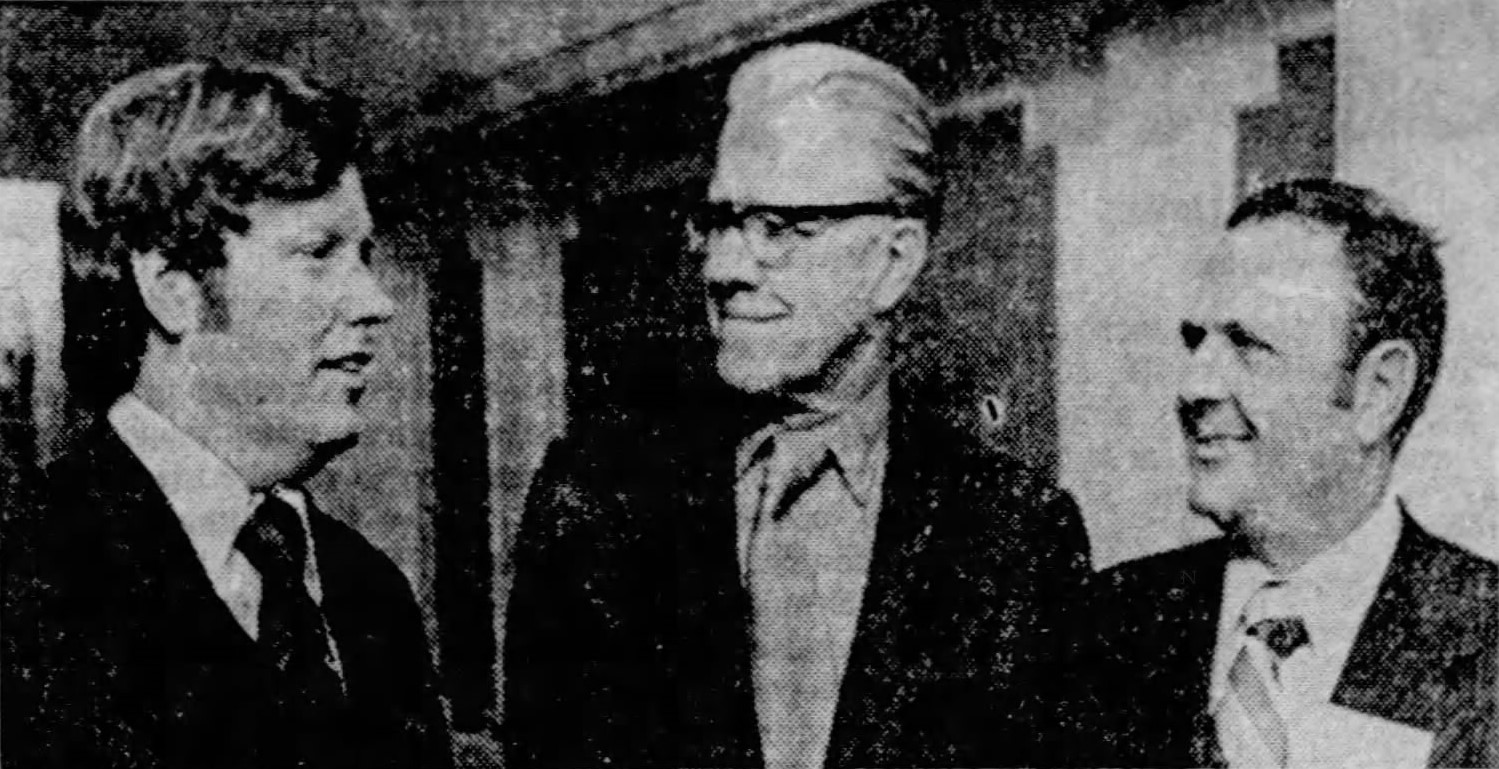
Malmgren, left, in 1973, as the President's deputy special representative for trade negotiations, discussing farm exports with members of the Farmers Cooperative Council of North Carolina

In 1972, Eberle picked Malmgren to become his second deputy. In May 1972 he was confirmed by the Senate as deputy special representative for trade negotiations. In this capacity, with the rank of ambassador, he was involved in negotiations on Article XXIV, as well as the Tokyo Round. Malmgren also worked on writing of the Trade Act of 1974, which granted the US President fast track authority in trade negotiations.

After Eberle resigned as trade representative in December 1974 during the administration of president Gerald Ford, Malmgren campaigned hard to be nominated as his successor. The White House included him on a long list of potential candidates, but he was not nominated, which Dryden attributes to his "reputation for abrasiveness" and affiliation with the Democratic Party. Malmgren remained at the office, serving as the acting trade representative until February 19, 1975, when he resigned. He later worked as a staff analyst for United States Senate Committee on Finance member Abraham Ribicoff. Malmgren was a fellow at the Woodrow Wilson International Center for Scholars in Spring 1975 and 1976, and from 1976 to 1977, he was on the faculty of George Washington University.

=== Lobbying for foreign business and governments (1975–1980) ===
After 1977, Malmgren primarily worked in lobbying and consulting. Many of his clients were Japanese business interests. According to the San Francisco Chronicle, Malmgren was part of "Japan's propaganda effort in the United States"; during the decade of the 1980s, he was "cited in 76 stories about trade issues, frequently criticizing tough legislation making its way through Congress. Yet none of the stories mentioned that Malmgren was working for Japanese clients at the time".

From the 1970s to at least 1990, he was a consultant for the Japan External Trade Organization (JETRO) and was one of a number of American lobbyists and advisors who, according to Newhouse News Service, "hampered ... the United States' effort to reduce its huge trade deficit with Japan". During this period, according to the Center for Public Integrity, "Malmgren never acknowledged his relationship [with JETRO] in his filings at Justice". He was paid more than $700,000 by JETRO.

Malmgren worked as a consultant to the European Community's trade negotiation arm in early 1979, as the Tokyo Round was ending. For this work he was paid $90,000. He also represented the Japan Whaling Association and was paid $300,000 to help Japanese TV manufacturers avoid import duties for dumping their merchandise in the U.S. market. According to Pat Choate, the results of Malmgren's work contributed to the demise of the American electronics industry. Dryden argues that while Malmgren's lobbying did not substantially impact US policy, he set a precedent for exorbitant fees to be paid in trade lobbying. Toshio Obi, in his 1980 book The Japan Lobby, wrote that Japan's lobbying in the U.S. was "next to idiotic" as Malmgren's fees were "out of order" with the standard fees lobbyists were then charging.

==== Ribicoff access solicitation ====
In 1978, according to the New York Times, Malmgren and his business partner circulated an ad for their consulting business which claimed they enjoyed "access to power" that could be leveraged for the commercial interests of potential clients, citing Malmgren's previous Senate work with United States Senator Abraham Ribicoff. In reporting on the affair, the Associated Press (AP) wrote that Malmgren "tried to use his connection with Sen. Abraham Ribicoff to solicit corporate clients at $200,000 each".

Ribicoff told the New York Times he was "shocked" at the solicitation. He noted that Malmgren and his partner "have absolutely no special relationship with me and are completely out of line to make such a representation". According to a person close to Ribicoff interviewed by The Washington Post, "if they had any access to Ribicoff, they've lost it". Malmgren said that the advertisement was "an awful mistake" and "not a good thing to do" in retrospect.

=== Later activities (1980–2025) ===
From 1982 to 1986 he was an adjunct professor at Georgetown University. In 1983 he was a director of the Atlantic Council of the United States.

Economist Pat Choate wrote in 1991 that Malmgren was "in the eyes of many...America's foremost trade authority", attributing Malmgren's later move into lobbying as signaling a change in acceptability of that profession: "[his] shift onto the payroll of foreign interests ... showed those trade experts who were still in government how much money could be made by lobbying for foreign interests" and prompted a "jealous, somewhat frantic competition to serve Japan".

Malmgren continued to work as a consultant in Washington, D.C. until at least 2015.

==== Claims of knowledge of UFOs, intervention in the Cuban Missile Crisis ====
In 2024, Malmgren publicly claimed that decades prior, he had been briefed on "otherworld technologies" by CIA officer Richard Bissell. In a later recording made prior to his death by podcaster Jesse Michels, Malmgren claimed to have also held a Q clearance granted by the Atomic Energy Commission (AEC); had been recruited into national security work by McGeorge Bundy; and that he had investigated, on behalf of John Kennedy, an alien object recovered by the AEC during a nuclear test. Malmgren also stated he personally confronted general Curtis LeMay during the Cuban Missile Crisis, thereby averting nuclear war. Malmgren, as part of his story, said he formed part of an "inner circle" of the Kennedy Administration centered on diplomat Sargent Shriver, with whom he claimed to have been close.

An investigative report by independent journalist Douglas Dean Johnson referencing declassified FBI background reports on Malmgren from 1970 and 1971, and federal job applications Malmgren signed and certified in 1963 and 1964, disproved many of Malmgren's key claims, including claims to have been a McNamara-NSC aide and to have held an Atomic Energy Commission clearance. Johnson also interviewed McGeorge Bundy's biographer Kai Bird who said he had never heard of Malmgren. Related to Malmgren's claims to have been a key player in the Cuban Missile Crisis, Sheldon M. Stern — who served 23 years as historian for the Kennedy Library — averred he had listened to 59 days of EXCOMM meeting audio recordings from the period of the crisis, and examined hundreds of related documents, and found no evidence Malmgren had been present or even mentioned. Asked to verify Malmgren's claim that he had a close relationship with Sargent Shriver, both Shriver's son Mark Kennedy Shriver and Shriver biographer Scott Stossel said they had never heard of him. Johnson concluded that Malmgren "hijacked the personas of real people to serve as characters in his self-glorifying fantasies" while author Jason Colavito opined that Johnson's investigation showed that Malmgren "spent a long time inflating his resume".

== Personal life ==
Malmgren married twice. His first wife was Patricia Malmgren (1934–2010), née Nelson, with whom he had three children (Erika, Pippa, and Britt). He later married Linda Einberg and had three more children. Malmgren died on February 13, 2025.
