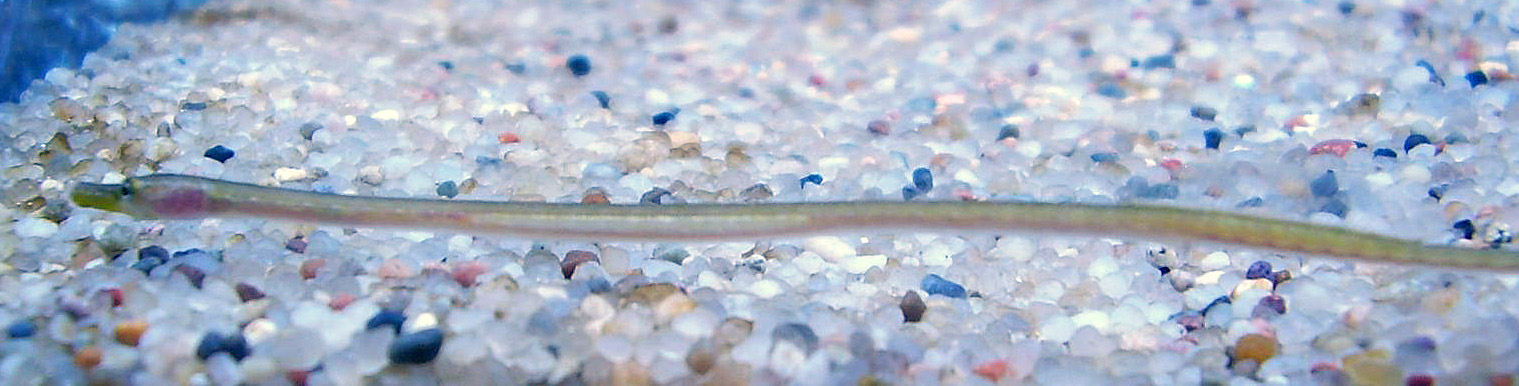
- Straightnose pipefish

Conservation status
- Least Concern (IUCN 3.1)

Scientific classification
- Kingdom: Animalia
- Phylum: Chordata
- Class: Actinopterygii
- Order: Syngnathiformes
- Family: Syngnathidae
- Genus: Nerophis
- Species: N. ophidion

Binomial name
- Nerophis ophidion (Linnaeus, 1758)

Synonyms
- Schyphius littoralis Risso, 1827; Scyphicus teres Rathke, 1837; Scyphius violaceus Risso, 1827; Syngnathus ophidion Linnaeus, 1758; Nerophis teres (Rathke, 1837)

= Straightnose pipefish =

Species of fish

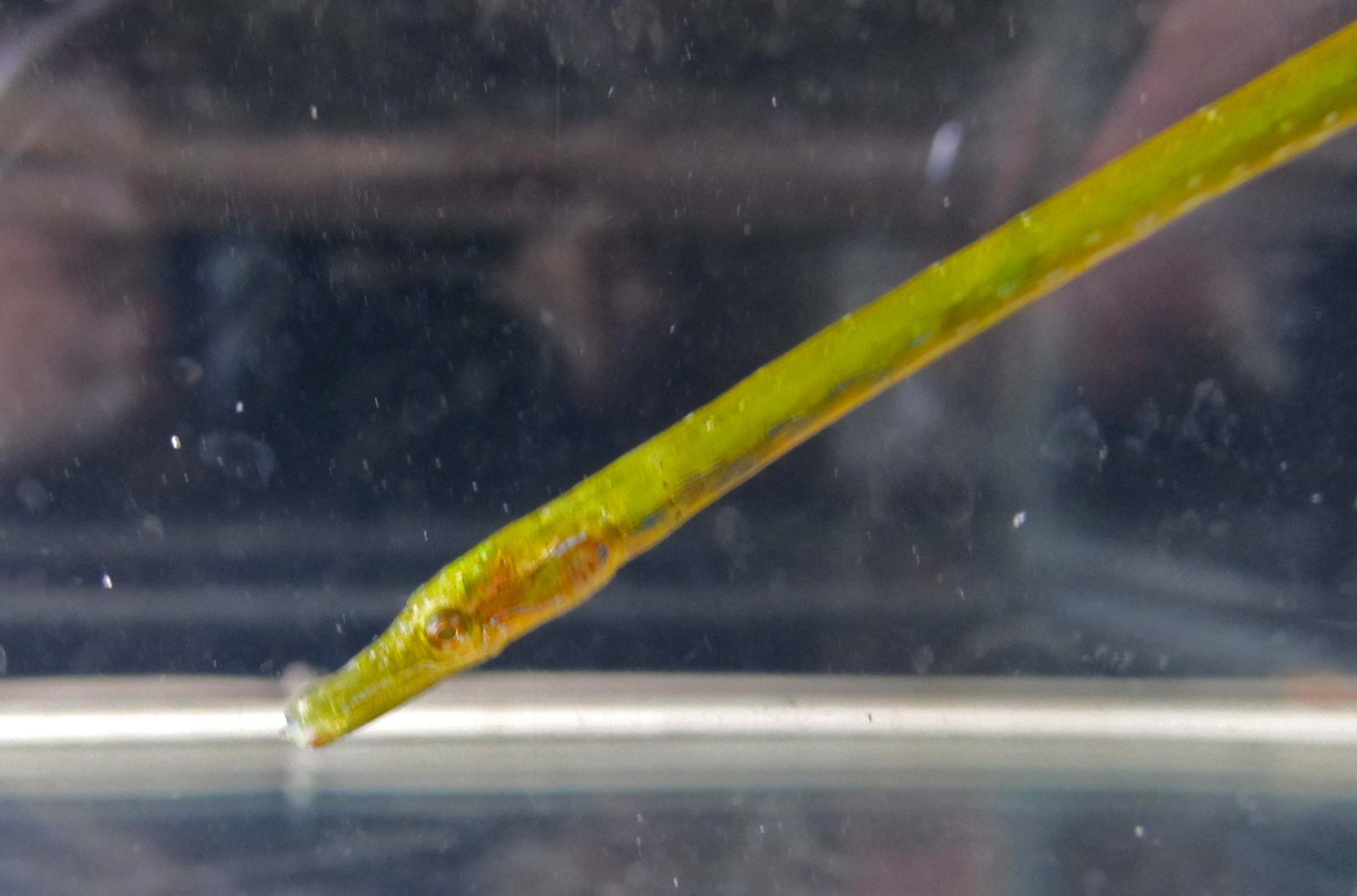
Head of a straightnose pipefish from the Hryhorivsky Estuary, Black Sea, Ukraine

The straightnose pipefish (Nerophis ophidion) is a species of pipefish which lives in brackish water in the northeastern Atlantic, the Baltic, Mediterranean and Black Sea.

== Description ==
The straightnose pipefish initially gives the impression of being a worm. The head is tiny and resembles that of a seahorse, to which this fish is closely related. The body is round in cross-section and the fins are tiny. The only fish with which it might be confused is the broadnosed pipefish (Syngnathus typhle) but that is more robust and has a hexagonal cross-section. The general colour of the straightnose pipefish is green with a yellowish belly. The female has pale blue markings on the head and body and both sexes become more colourful at breeding time when the male's snout turns yellow. The average size is about 15 to 20 cm (6 to 8 in) with a maximum of 30 cm (12 in).

== Range ==
This fish is found in the North-eastern Atlantic along the coasts of Europe, its range extending from southern Norway to Morocco. It is also present in the Baltic, the Mediterranean, and the Black Sea. It inhabits sandy bottoms and is part of the fouling community, at depths from 2 to 15 m (6 ft 7 in to 49 ft 3 in).

== Biology ==
The straightnose pipefish lives among eelgrass and seaweed with its tail wrapped around the vegetation and its head elevated. Here it is well-camouflaged, and feeds on zooplankton and copepods by sucking them in.

This species of pipefish is used as a model to study mate choice and sex role-reversal. Like other species of pipefish and the closely related seahorses, the straighnose pipefish exhibits male parental care, meaning that female reproductive success is limited by her ability to court and mate with a suitable male. In the straighnosed pipefish, female-female competition and mate choice by males has resulted in female-specific coloration, female ornamental skin folds, and more active courtship in females.
