= Pippa Malmgren =

American economist

- Born: May 21, 1962 (age 64); United States
- Relatives: Harald Malmgren (father)

Academic background
- Education: Mount Vernon College; London School of Economics
- Thesis: Economic statecraft: United States antidumping and countervailing duty policy (1991)
- Doctoral advisor: Susan Strange; Michael Hodges

Academic work
- Discipline: International economics
- Website: drpippamalmgren.com

Karen Philippa "Pippa" Malmgren (born May 21, 1962) is an American technology entrepreneur and economist. She is the daughter of Harald Malmgren, who worked in several US presidential administrations.

She served as Special Assistant to the President of the United States, George W. Bush, for Economic Policy on the National Economic Council and is a former member of the U.S. President's Working Group on Financial Markets and The President's Working Group on Corporate Governance. She wrote the dissertation "Economic Statecraft: United States Antidumping and Countervailing Duty Policy" to obtain her PhD in International Relations from the London School of Economics (LSE) in 1991 and was the commencement speaker at LSE in 2013 and 2016.

Malmgren is the author of Geopolitics for Investors, Signals: How Everyday Signs Help Us Navigate the World's Turbulent Economy, The Leadership Lab and The Infinite Leader. She has been credited with the first usage of the term "shrinkflation".

In 2009 Malmgren was co-founder of Principalis Asset Management, an investment firm.

Malmgren spoke on timelines of economic recovery in Asia, Japan, and the United States.

== Selected publications ==
- Malmgren, Pippa (2015). Geopolitics for investors. CFA Institute. ISBN 978-1934667835.
- Malmgren, Philippa (2015). Signals: The Breakdown of the Social Contract and the Rise of Geopolitics. Grosvenor House Publishing Limited. ISBN 978-1-78148-740-2.
- Malmgren, Philippa (2016). Signals: How Everyday Signs Can Help Us Navigate the World's Turbulent Economy. Orion Publishing Group Limited. ISBN 978-1-4746-0350-8.
- Lewis, Chris; Malmgren, Pippa (2018). The Leadership Lab: Understanding Leadership in the 21st Century. Kogan Page Publishers. ISBN 978-0-7494-8344-9.
- Lewis, Chris; Malmgren, Pippa (2020). The Infinite Leader: Balancing the Demands of Modern Business Leadership. Kogan Page Publishers. ISBN 978-1-78966-650-2.
- Malmgren, Pippa (2025). "Dr. Harald Malmgren Passed". Second Line of Defense.
