= Rinner-Kühn v FWW Spezial-Gebäudereinigung GmbH & Co KG =

Rinner-Kühn v FWW Spezial-Gebaudereinigung GmbH & Co KG
- Court: European Court of Justice
- Decided: 13 July 1989
- Citations: (1989) C-171/88, [1989] ECR 2743

Keywords
- Objective justification

Rinner-Kühn v FWW Spezial-Gebaudereinigung GmbH & Co KG (1989) C-171/88 is an EU labour law case, concerning indirect discrimination and objective justification.

== Facts ==
The company refused to pay its part-time worker, Frau Ingrid Rinner-Kühn, any sick pay. National law required sick pay for people working over ten hours per week. The German Government argued the law was justified because those working under ten hours a week were less integrated into businesses than other workers and less dependent.

== Judgment ==
The ECJ started by deciding that sick pay was within the term ‘pay’ under TFEU art 157. So denial of sick pay was prima facie indirect discrimination against women. It rejected the Government's justification, because though it was a decision for a national court, ‘generalizations about certain categories of workers… do not enable criteria which are both objective and unrelated to any discrimination on grounds of sex to be identified.’ The ECJ did accept, however, that broader considerations apply when it is a law. If the law would ‘meet a necessary aim of social policy and that they are suitable and requisite for attaining that aim’ it would be justified.

== See also ==
- UK labour law
- Unfair dismissal
