= Edwin Nolte =

American politician

Member of the Missouri Senate from the 34th district
- In office elected 1930 – ?

Personal details
- Born: January 27, 1885 St. Louis, Missouri, US
- Died: December 14, 1940 (aged 55) St. Charles County, Missouri, US
- Party: Republican
- Spouse: Laura E. Evans
- Occupation: insurance business

Edwin Nolte (January 27, 1885 – December 14, 1940) was an American politician from St. Louis, Missouri, who was elected to the Missouri Senate in 1930. He was educated at the St. Louis area Smith Academy.
