= Bruno Hofer =

German fish pathologist

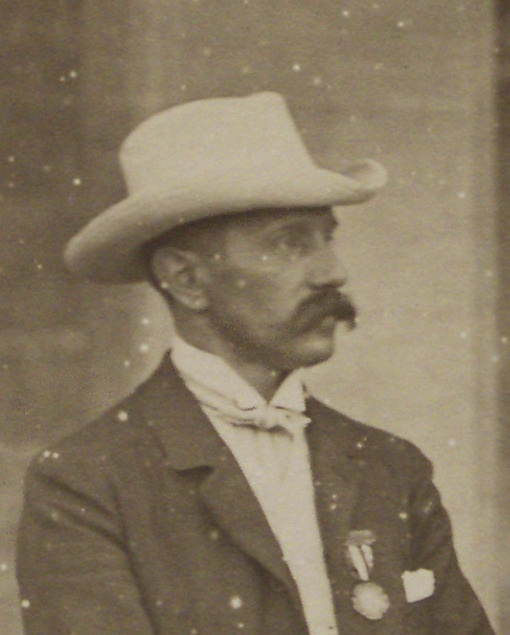
- Bruno Hofer in 1904
- Born: 15 December 1861; Rhein, Province of Prussia
- Died: 7 July 1916 (aged 54); Munich
- Education: University of Königsberg, Ludwig-Maximilians-Universität München (doctorate 1887)
- Known for: Fischkrankheitslehre (fish pathology) and other books; taxonomic description of the myxosporean parasite, Myxobolus cerebralis
- Scientific career
- Fields: Ichthyology
- Workplaces: Zoological Institute of the Ludwig-Maximilians-Universität München

Bruno Hofer (15 December 1861 – 7 July 1916) was a German fishery scientist, credited with being the founder of fish pathology.

== Career ==
Hofer was born in Rhein in the Province of Prussia in 1861. He studied natural sciences at the University of Königsberg, receiving his doctorate in 1887 at the Ludwig-Maximilians-Universität München as a student of Richard Hertwig. He then worked as an assistant at the Zoological Institute of the Ludwig-Maximilians-Universität München, and in 1889 obtained his habilitation. He obtained a position at the Zoological Institute as a university lecturer and in 1891 acquired citizenship of the Kingdom of Bavaria. In 1894, he was appointed as a curator of the Zoologischen Sammlung des Staates, and two years later became a lecturer for ichthyology at the veterinary university of the Ludwig-Maximilians-Universität München. In 1898, he was awarded an associate professorship for zoology and ichthyology and the chair of a full professor in 1904.

During his career, he was also director of the "Royal Bavarian Research Station for Fisheries" and the "Royal Bavarian Research Station for Fish-Farming", vice-president of the "Bavarian Association of Fishermen" and editor of the magazine "Allgemeine Fischereizeitung". In 1909, he circumscribed the whitefish species Coregonus bavaricus. Hofer died in 1916 in Munich at the age of 54.

== Publications ==
Hofer was particularly active in the field of fish parasitology and pathology, and wrote the comprehensive German text on the subject, Fischkrankheitslehre (fish pathology), as well as his "Handbuch der Fischkrankheiten" (1904), "Die Süßwasserfische von Mitteleuropas" (1908), "Über die Krebspest" (1898), and more than 200 publications. In 1896, he was the author of a limnologic study of Lake Constance, titled "Die Verbreitung der Thierwelt im Bodensee" (The spread of wildlife in Lake Constance). One of his most significant publications was the taxonomic description of the myxosporean parasite, Myxobolus cerebralis. Hofer is also known for his early work in environmental protection, in particular for the preservation of water quality and drinking-water resources.
