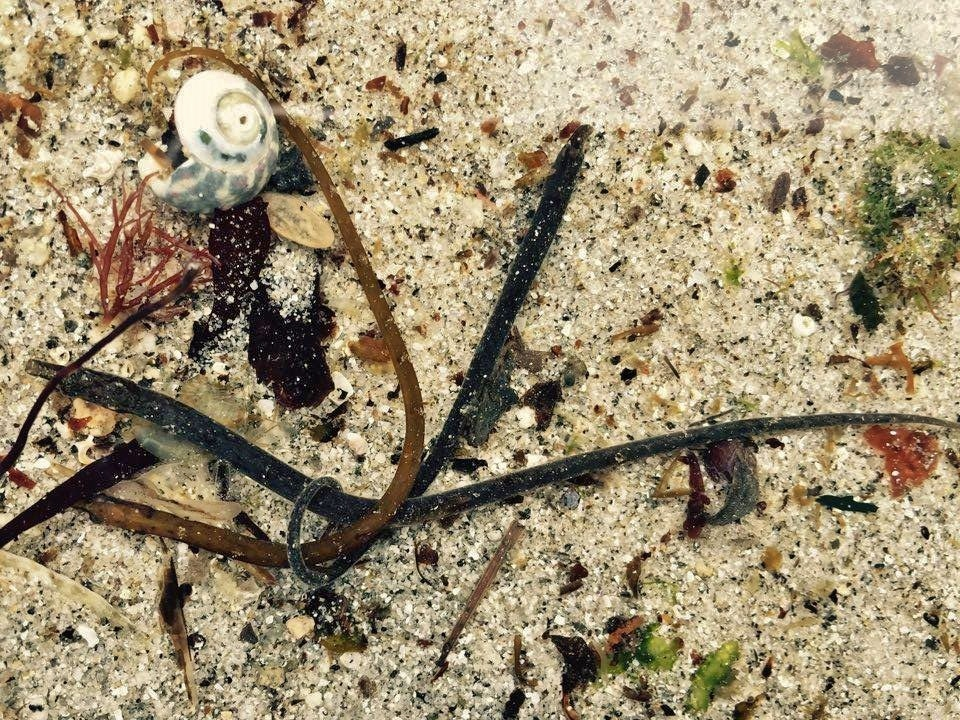

Conservation status
- Least Concern (IUCN 3.1)

Scientific classification
- Domain: Eukaryota
- Kingdom: Animalia
- Phylum: Chordata
- Class: Actinopterygii
- Order: Syngnathiformes
- Family: Syngnathidae
- Genus: Nerophis
- Species: N. lumbriciformis

Binomial name
- Nerophis lumbriciformis (Jenyns, 1835)

Synonyms
- Syngnathus lumbriciformis Jenyns, 1835

= Worm pipefish =

Species of fish

The worm pipefish (Nerophis lumbriciformis) is a species of pipefish (of the family Syngnathidae), found in the North-eastern Atlantic along the coasts of Europe from the southern Norway, Kattegat and British Islands to Río de Oro in Western Sahara. The fish has a length of up to 15 cm. It inhabits rocky coastal areas with macrophytes at depths to 30 m.

The worm pipefish feeds primarily on Harpacticoid and cyclopoid copepods

Like other pipefish, this species is sex role-reversed, with females courting males whom subsequently brood the young.

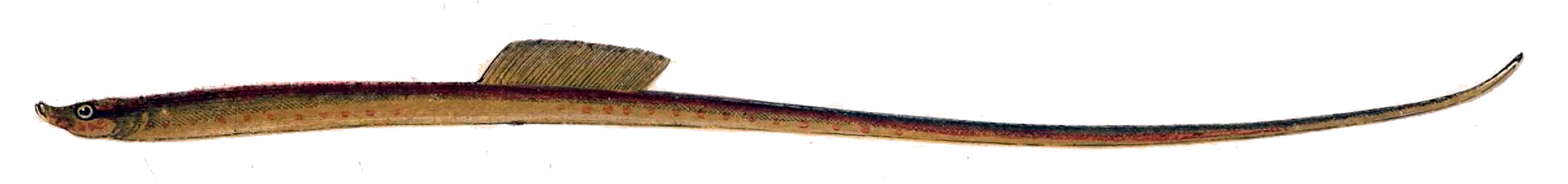
Naturalist drawing.
