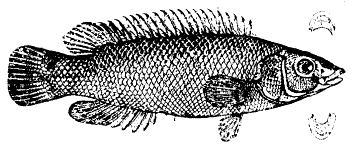

Conservation status
- Least Concern (IUCN 3.1)

Scientific classification
- Kingdom: Animalia
- Phylum: Chordata
- Class: Actinopterygii
- Division: Teleostei
- Order: Labriformes
- Family: Labridae
- Subfamily: Labrinae
- Genus: Acantholabrus; Valenciennes, 1839
- Species: A. palloni

Binomial name
- Acantholabrus palloni (A. Risso, 1810)
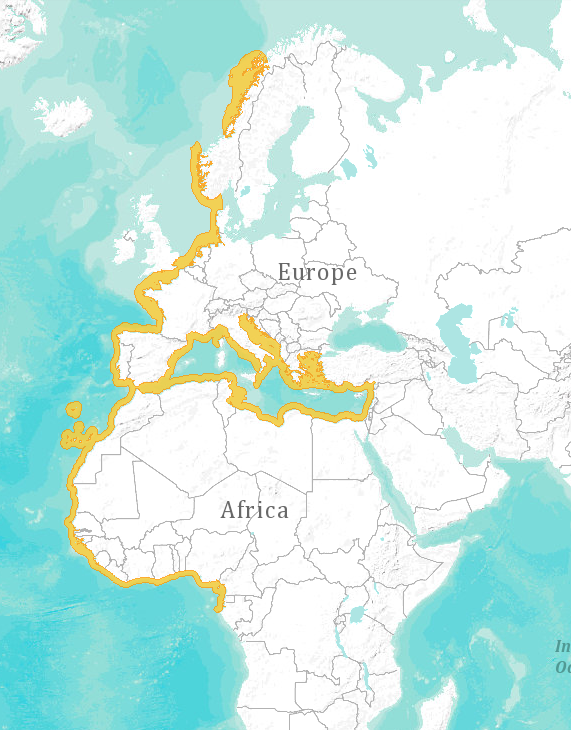
- Map of the range of Acantholabrus palloni

Synonyms
- Lutjanus palloni A. Risso, 1810; Labrus palloni (A. Risso, 1810); Crenilabrus luscus (Linnaeus, 1758); Labrus pallidus Nardo, 1824; Acantholabrus imbricatus R. T. Lowe, 1839; Acantholabrus couchii Valenciennes, 1839; Acantholabrus couchi Valenciennes, 1839

= Scale-rayed wrasse =

Species of fish

The scale-rayed wrasse, Acantholabrus palloni, is a species of wrasse native to the eastern Atlantic Ocean where it occurs from Norway to Gabon (including the various eastern Atlantic island groups) and in the Mediterranean Sea and the Adriatic Sea. This species can be found on reefs at depths of from 30 to 500 m (100 to 1,640 ft). It can reach a length of 25 cm (9.8 in). It is a commercially important food fish. It is currently the only known member of its genus.

It was first described by naturalist Antoine Risso, in 1810.
