= Dean Schillinger =

Dean-David Schillinger is an American general internist and former Chief of the University of California San Francisco (UCSF) Division of General Internal Medicine at San Francisco General Hospital (SFGH). In 2006, he founded the UCSF Center for Vulnerable Populations, whose mission is to advance health in poor communities. His research focuses on health communication for vulnerable populations, and the prevention and control of type 2 diabetes.

Schillinger has advocated for increasing awareness and prevention of type 2 diabetes, and became a vocal proponent for the successful passage of a sugary drink tax in the cities of Oakland, Berkeley and San Francisco, California. In 2019, Schillinger was appointed as co-chair of the General Populations Prevention Sub-Committee of the congressionally-chartered National Clinical Care Commission.

== Medical training ==
Schillinger attended Brown University, where he studied Russian Language & Literature, and obtained his medical degree in 1991 from the University of Pennsylvania School of Medicine. He performed his residency training in Internal Medicine at UCSF. He served as Chief Medical Resident at San Francisco General Hospital before joining the faculty there.

== Early career and research ==
Schillinger has led a number of studies exploring the impact of limited health literacy on prevention and control of diabetes and heart disease. His research helped to demonstrate that different levels of health literacy affects diabetes control, complications and overall death rates. Schillinger has sought to improve provider-patient communication by demonstrating the effectiveness of tools such as "the teach-back method" and the benefits of visual forms of communication with respect to the quality and safety of medical care. His research to expand the construct of Precision Medicine to include Precision Communication was published in Science. He also developed the first framework (SPHERE) to characterize the varied effects of social media on public health.

He co-authored and edited the medical textbook, Medical Care of Vulnerable and Underserved Patients, and co-directs an international course on this topic for healthcare providers. The patient self-management book he co-authored and developed in collaboration with diabetes patients has been distributed by the American College of Physicians to over 1 million individuals.

== Public health advocacy ==
Schillinger served as one of 12 non-federal members of the National Clinical Care Commission, charged with making recommendations to Congress about how federal agencies can be leveraged and coordinated to prevent and control diabetes. In 2021, he helped author its final report in which he argued that diabetes be addressed not only as a biomedical problem, but also as a societal one. The report made transformative recommendations to Congress for an all-of-government approach to preventing and controlling diabetes.

Schillinger is a longtime advocate for the public health regulation of sugary drinks. In 2016, he served as the scientific expert for the City and County of San Francisco in defense of a lawsuit filed in federal court by the American Beverage Association for an injunction against the city's ordinance to mandate health warning notices on billboards advertising sugary drinks. As a result, the first sugary drink warning label law in the world was set to go into effect July 25, 2016. However, in 2017, the 9th U.S. Circuit Court of Appeals granted the beverage industry's request to block the warning labels, rested on an assessment that the warning notice was too large, not absence of disease causation. The city recently reinstated the ordinance with a smaller-sized warning notice.

Industry conflicts of interest in nutritional science and policy were also the subject of two Schillinger authored articles. The first demonstrated that sugar-sweetened beverage companies funded nearly every clinical study that concludes that their products do not cause diabetes or obesity. The second revealed the ways in which scientists funded by the International Life Sciences Institute – which is financed by fast food and chemical industries – used questionable methods to draw conclusions that national and international dietary guidelines to limit added sugar intake are not based in sound science. The controversy surrounding this conflict of interest was the subject of an investigative journalism piece in The Atlantic Monthly. Schillinger's research team demonstrated that the sugary drink tax in Berkeley, California resulted in nearly a 50% reduction over three years in the consumption of sugary drinks, relative to changes in consumption in neighboring non-taxed cities.

Schillinger co-created a social media campaign called The Bigger Picture, which engages young people to inspire policy action to prevent Type 2 diabetes through art, particularly spoken word poetry. In April 2020, Schillinger appeared in the PBS documentary Blood Sugar Rising, and the European documentary Un Monde Obèse (An Obese World) aired on Arte, which explores some of the root causes and societal consequences of obesity and type 2 diabetes.

For his efforts to promote public health literacy in California, Schillinger received the 2016 James L. Irvine California Leadership Award, which also led to a state Senate resolution to honor his contributions on behalf of the people of California.

In recognition of the global reach of his innovative work in public health communication, he was recognized by the World Health Organization in 2021.

== Publications ==
Talmadge E. King, Margaret B. Wheeler, Alicia Fernandez, Dean Schillinger, Andrew B. Bindman, Kevin Grumbach, Teresa J. Villela (2017, 2nd ed). Medical Management of Vulnerable and Underserved Patients: Principles, Practice, Populations. New York: McGraw Hill Education.

Schillinger D, Grumbach K, Piette J, Wang F, Osmond D, Daher C, Palacios J, Sullivan GD, Bindman AB. Association of health literacy with diabetes outcomes. Jour Amer Med Assoc. 2002 Jul 24–31;288(4):475-82.

Schillinger D, Piette J, Grumbach K, Wang F, Wilson C, Daher C, Leong-Grotz K, Castro C, Bindman A. Closing the Loop: Physician-Patient Communication with Diabetic Patients Who Have Low Health Literacy. Arch Int Med. January 13, 2003;163:83-90.

Seligman H, Schillinger D. Hunger and Socioeconomic Disparities in Chronic Disease. New Eng J Med.

Schillinger, D., & Huey, N. (2018). Messengers of Truth and Health—Young Artists of Color Raise Their Voices to Prevent Diabetes. Journ Amer Med Assoc. 2018. 319(11), 1076–1078.

Schillinger D, Chittamuru D, Ramírez AS. From "Infodemics" to Health Promotion: A Novel Framework for the Role of Social Media in Public Health. Am J Public Health. 2020 Sep;110(9):1393-1396.

Schillinger D, Balyan R, Crossley SA, McNamara DS, Liu JY, Karter AJ. Employing computational linguistics techniques to identify limited patient health literacy: Findings from the ECLIPPSE study. Health Serv Res. 2020 Sep 23.

Dean Schillinger, Nicholas Duran, Scott Crossley, Renu Balyan, DS McNamara, Andrew J. Karter. Precision communication: Physicians' linguistic adaptation to patients' health literacy. Sciences Advances. Vol 7. Issue 51. Dec 17, 2021

D Schillinger, A Bullock, WH Herman. An All-of-Government Approach to Diabetes: The National Clinical Care Commission's Report to Congress. Health Affairs Forefront. Jan 14, 2022.
