= Jens-Ole Malmgren =

Danish composer

Jens-Ole "Ole" Malmgren (born 16 February 1946) is a Danish composer. Piano lessons from Leif Bülow Nielsen 1967-68. He spent some instructive years with Gruppen for Alternativ Musik prior to doing committee work with Det Unge Tonekunstnerselskab (DUT) and Danish Composers Society for a number of years. Works for small and greater ensembles, e.g. "Circulations" to Elisabeth Klein first performed 1976. Read more.

== List of works (selected) ==
- 1974 "Savoyages" for symphony orchestra in 2 movements
- 1976 "Circulations" for piano, dedication Elisabeth Klein
- 1980/2018 ”Omkring Hamlet”, opera in 6 scenes - libretto by the composer after Johs. Sløk's danish translation of "Hamlet, Prince of Denmark" by W. Shakespeare
- 2006 "Symphonic Jazz 1 - Traditional" – "Symphonic Jazz 2 - Avantgarde" is planned
- 2010 ”Helike Athanatos”, opera in 6 scenes, libretto by Franz Knappik, idea by Andreas Drekis
- 2013 ”Der BabelƨTurm” for soprano and chamber ensemble, lyrics by Saadi and Goethe
- 2014 ”We are all travellers” version for choir a capella, lyrics by Maria Fuchs
- 2015 "Lights" for symphony orchestra with piano
