= Nolte =

Nolte is a surname that may refer to:

- Benjamin Nolte (born 1982), German politician
- Bill Nolte (born 1953), U.S. singer and stage actor
- Carl Nolte (born c. 1933), U.S. journalist
- Charles Nolte (1923–2010), U.S. actor and educator
- Claudia Nolte (born 1966), German politician
- Conrad Henrich Nolte Wislouschill ( Wesfalia Lippe Lippstad 02-02-1871/ Perú Piura Paita16-01-1941) Deuch Holzbauunternehmer
- Dorothy Nolte (1924–2005), U.S. writer and family counselor
- Edwin Nolte, (1885–1940), U.S. politician and Missouri senator
- Eric Nolte (born 1964), U.S. baseball pitcher
- Ernst Ferdinand Nolte (1791–1875), German botanist
- Ernst Nolte (1923–2016), German historian and philosopher
- Georg Nolte (born 1959), German jurist
- Harry Nolte (born 1961), German Olympic sprint canoer
- Jan Nolte (born 1988), German politician
- Jerry Nolte (born 1955), U.S. politician, educator, and commercial artist
- Jürgen Nolte (born 1959), German Olympic fencer
- Kay Nolte Smith (1932–1993), U.S. writer
- Mark Nolte, American politician
- Nick Nolte (born 1941), U.S. actor
- Pierre Nolte (born 1965), South African singer and songwriter known by the artistic name Valiant Swart
- Richard Nolte (1920–2007), U.S. diplomat and analyst
- Roeland J. M. Nolte (born 1944), Dutch chemist
- Vincent Otto Nolte, author of Fifty Years in Both Hemispheres, or Reminiscences of the Life of a Former Merchant (1854, translated from the German)
- Zelda Nolte (1929–2003), South African-British sculptor

== See also ==
- Nolte State Park, U.S. park in Cumberland, Washington state
