= Krøyer =

Krøyer or Kroyer is a surname and can refer to:

- Henrik Nikolai Krøyer (1799–1870), Danish zoologist
- Peder Severin Krøyer (1851–1909), Norwegian-Danish painter
- Marie Krøyer (1867–1940), Danish painter
- Hans Ernst Krøyer (1798–1879), Danish composer
- Bill Kroyer, American animator and director

== See also ==
- Krøyer's deep sea angler fish
