= Ulrika Malmgren =

Swedish actress and radio presenter

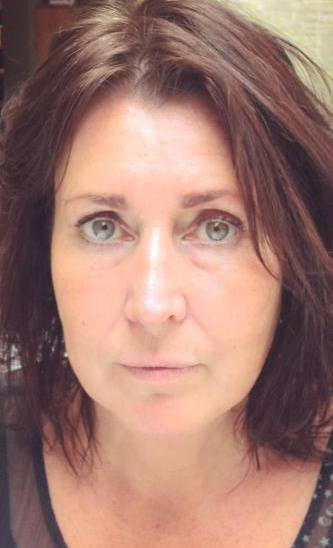
Ulrika Malmgren

Ulrika Malmgren (born 12 September 1960) is a Swedish actress and radio presenter. She was born in Stockholm and started studying at Teaterhögskolan in Malmö between 1984 and 1987. She was director of the Darling Desperados acting company as one of its founders. She presented the Sveriges Radio show Ny Våg between 1979 and 1983, which focused on new music. And on 3 August 1994, she presented an episode of the Sveriges Radio show Sommar i P1 where she told about her life and career. Ulrika Malmgren works since several years back as a lector in scenis impersonation at Stockholms dramatiska högskola. Where she is also one of the founders and main persons behind the project called "Eget Projekt.
