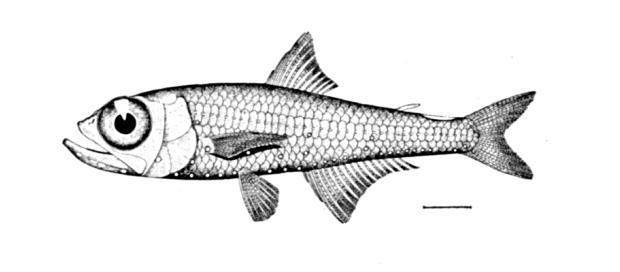

Conservation status
- Least Concern (IUCN 3.1)

Scientific classification
- Kingdom: Animalia
- Phylum: Chordata
- Class: Actinopterygii
- Order: Myctophiformes
- Family: Myctophidae
- Genus: Hygophum
- Species: H. benoiti

Binomial name
- Hygophum benoiti Cocco, 1838

= Benoit's lanternfish =

Species of fish

The Benoit's lanternfish (Hygophum benoiti) is a species of widespread oceanodromous lanternfish.

== Description ==
H. benoiti reaches a length of 5.5 cm (2.2 in), and it contains 13 to 14 dorsal finrays, 20 anal finrays, and 13 to 15 pectoral finrays.

== Distribution and habitat ==
It lives in depths from 51 to 700 meters deep, ranging from areas from the Eastern Atlantic near the U.S.A., all the way to the Mediterranean. It can be found below 700 meters at day, and below 600 meters at night, but the maximum was 51 to 100 and 301 to 350 meters below at night.

== Conservation ==
H. benoiti has a stable population, and it has no specific threats to it, plus its wide distribution makes it occur in more than 1 marine protected area, so the IUCN Red List puts it at Least Concern.
