= Coregonus bavaricus =

Conservation status
- Critically Endangered (IUCN 3.1)

Scientific classification
- Kingdom: Animalia
- Phylum: Chordata
- Class: Actinopterygii
- Order: Salmoniformes
- Family: Salmonidae
- Genus: Coregonus
- Species: C. bavaricus

Binomial name
- Coregonus bavaricus Hofer, 1909

Synonyms
- Coregonus acronius bavarica Hofer, 1909

Species of fish

Coregonus bavaricus, the Ammersee kilch, is a species of freshwater whitefish endemic to Lake Ammersee in the German state of Upper Bavaria. A small, silver-colored fish, it typically lives between 60–85 m (197–279 ft) deep, though shallower in the summer months. In the early 20th century the Ammersee kilch was an important commercial species, but its population declined drastically in the 1930s onward due to overfishing and eutrophication of the only lake in which it is found. Today it is listed as Critically Endangered by the International Union for Conservation of Nature (IUCN) and may be on the verge of extinction.

== Taxonomy ==
The Ammersee kilch was first described in 1909 by German fishery scientist Bruno Hofer in his work Die Süsswasserfische von Mittel-Europa. Hofer thought it a subspecies of the Lake Constance whitefish, now extinct, so he named it Coregonus acronius bavarica. Coregonus acronius was the scientific name of the Lake Constance whitefish at the time. The Ammersee kilch was reclassified as its own species in 1997 by Swiss ichthyologist Maurice Kottelat in his piece "European freshwater fishes: an heuristic checklist of the freshwater fishes of Europe" in volume 52 of the journal Biologia.

== Description ==
The Ammersee kilch is a small fish with a slender, elongated body, blunted snout, large eyes, and subterminal mouth. The body is primarily silver in color, though the scales darken considerably dorsally and ventrally. It can reach sizes of up to 24.1 cm (9.5 in) and mature females weigh between 60–80 g (0.13–0.18 lb). It can have anywhere from 18 to 28 gillrakers, but typically within the range of 21–24. The pectoral fins are short when folded.

== Distribution and habitat ==
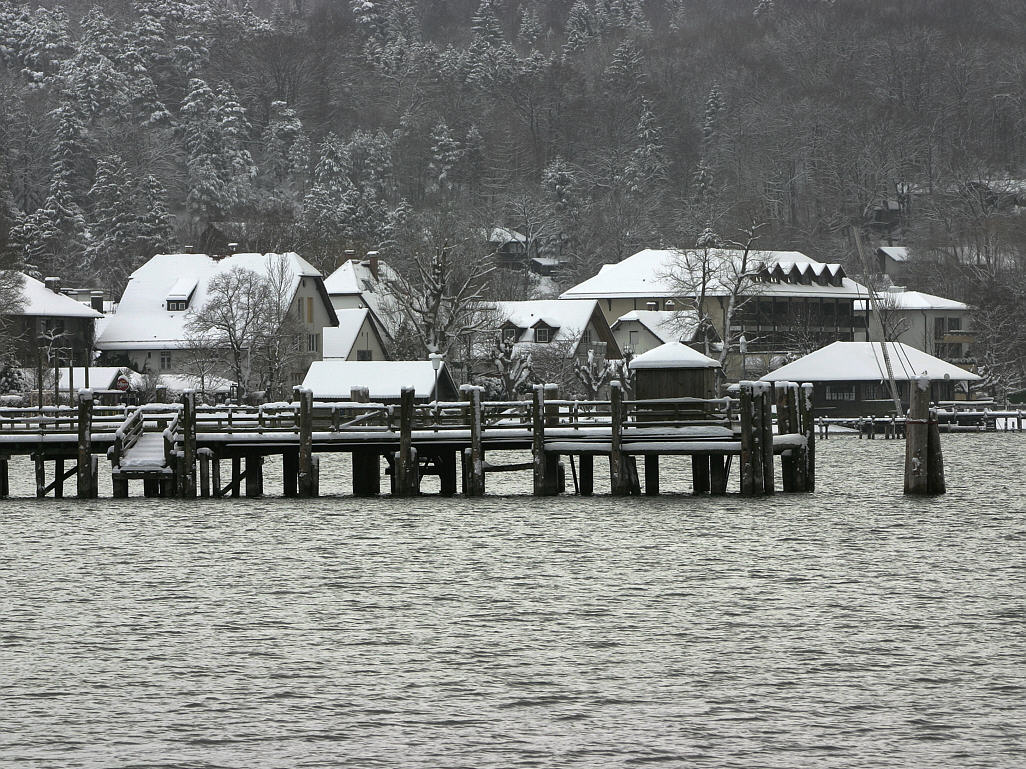
Lake Ammersee in the winter.

The Ammersee kilch has an extremely narrow distribution: it is endemic to Lake Ammersee in Germany, which covers only 41 square kilometres (16 sq mi), however the deep water in which the fish lives probably only makes up 10 square kilometres (4 sq mi). Its depth range is 60–85 m (197–279 ft) for most of the year, but shallower in the summer months, typically between 30–40 m (98–131 ft) in depth. Spawning, which takes place in June and July, occurs 40–50 m (130–160 ft) deep on the lake bottom. Notably, Lake Ammersee is a mesotrophic lake, in which the water is typically clear and has medium nutrient density. Human activity and pollution during the 20th century led to eutrophication of the lake, a process in which bacterial and algal levels increase in a body of water. Eutrophication can cause fish to suffocate by lowering the oxygen levels in the water, and the IUCN mentions this as the primary threat to the survival of the Ammersee kilch species.

== Biology and ecology ==
Because of its rarity, little is known about the biology of the Ammersee kilch. Spawning occurs at the lake floor, 40–50 m (130–160 ft) in depth, in the summer, typically between June 15 and July 15.

== Human interaction ==
In the early 1900s, the Ammersee kilch was an important commercial species, but by the 1930s local fishermen considered it to be very rare. Pressure from commercial fishing combined with eutrophication starting in the 1950s led to steep population declines. Although the water quality of Lake Ammer increased in the 1970s due to drainage of local wastewater from the lake basin, the Ammersee kilch population never recovered. Today, the Ammersee kilch is listed as Critically Endangered by the IUCN, and only three individuals have been caught since 2000. Preserved specimens of the Ammersee kilch are also extremely rare. A 2005 study done to redescribe the species was only able to locate three specimens: two that were caught in 1951 and a third caught after a two-year search from 2002 to 2004.
