= Thienemann =

Thienemann is a surname. Notable people with the surname include:

- August Thienemann (1882–1960), German limnologist, zoologist and ecologist
- August Wilhelm Thienemann (1830–1884), German priest and ornithologist
- Johannes Thienemann (1863–1938), German ornithologist
- Ludwig Thienemann (1793–1858), German physician and naturalist
- Otto Thienemann (late 19th c.), Austrian architect. Modified Lutheran City Church and designed the Thienemannhof and Café Museum buildings in Vienna
