= Oken =

Oken is a surname. Notable people with the surname include:

- Lorenz Oken (originally Okenfuß) (1779–1851), German naturalist, botanist, biologist, and ornithologist
  - 46563 Oken, a main-belt asteroid
  - Oken (crater), a lunar crater
- Steven Oken (1962–2004), American convicted murderer
