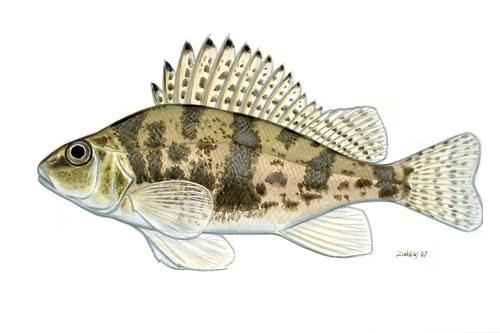

Conservation status
- Least Concern (IUCN 3.1)

Scientific classification
- Kingdom: Animalia
- Phylum: Chordata
- Class: Actinopterygii
- Order: Perciformes
- Family: Percidae
- Genus: Gymnocephalus
- Species: G. baloni

Binomial name
- Gymnocephalus baloni Holčík & K. Hensel, 1974
- Range of G. baloni (Compiled by: IUCN, 2013.) Resident

= Balon's ruffe =

Species of fish

Balon's ruffe (Gymnocephalus baloni), also known as the Danube ruffe, is a species of freshwater ray-finned fish, a ruffe, from the family Percidae which is native to the drainages of the Danube from delta to Germany and the Dnieper from delta to Kyiv and is expected to occur in the Dniester. It inhabits areas with sand or mud substrates. It is active at night and feeds on small invertebrates. This species can reach a length of 15 centimetres (5.9 in) SL. It is named after Polish-Canadian ichthyologist Eugene K. Balon (1930–2013).
