= Truckee Formation =

Geologic formation in Nevada, United States

- Stratigraphic range: Late Miocene, 10.3 Ma
- Type: Formation
- Unit of: Lahontan Basin

Lithology
- Primary: Diatomite

Location
- Region: Nevada
- Country: United States

Type section
- Named for: Truckee River

The Truckee Formation is a lacustrine geologic formation in Nevada, USA. It preserves fossils dating back to the late Miocene. Part of the Lahontan Basin, it was deposited in the prehistoric Lake Truckee, a predecessor to Lake Lahontan.

== Paleoecology ==
The formation is notable for its preservation of articulated vertebrate skeletons in diatomite, which is mined near Hazen, Nevada. The diatomite deposition, which would have occurred seasonally, provides a snapshot of the ecological dynamics that would have occurred in the lake ecosystem every year. Despite the exquisite preservation, only a total of eleven vertebrate taxa are known from the diatomite beds. However, the two most abundant vertebrate taxa of the formation provide crucial data about eco-evolutionary dynamics within a prehistoric ecosystem.

Among the most famous taxa from the formation is the stickleback Gasterosteus doryssus, which provides the majority of fossil fish specimens from the formation. Fossil specimens of this stickleback form a time series spanning many generations over thousands of years, in which they can be observed developing a number of adaptations to their lake environment and diverging into two distinct ecotypes, exemplifying the rapid evolution that their modern relative, the three-spined stickleback, is well known for. The other most frequent taxon in the formation is the killifish Fundulus nevadensis; despite its abundance, they are very rare up until the youngest sections, very few of its fossils co-occur with sticklebacks, and when the killifish do become abundant in the fossil record, the sticklebacks essentially disappear from the lake within a period of less than 50 years. This suggests that following their colonization of the lake, the killifish may have driven the sticklebacks to extinction on a rapid timescale comparable to modern biological invasions.

Uniquely, the paleofauna of the formation shares many elements with the native freshwater fauna found in lowlands along the Pacific Coast. It is thought that the Sierra Nevada Mountains were lower when the formation was deposited, allowing for connectivity between the Pacific lowlands and the rivers draining out of Lake Truckee, and in turn allowing for fishes from these habitats to colonize the lake. The rise of the mountains would have eventually cut off this water source, drying out the rivers and driving the ancestors of these fish to extinction. The exception is the catfish Ameiurus hazenensis, which belongs to a lineage found in eastern North America; it is thought that Lake Truckee also had some connectivity with the Mississippi Basin, explaining the catfish's presence there.

== Vertebrate paleobiota ==
Based on Cerasconi et al., 2024:

=== Ray-finned fish ===
Genus	Species	Material	Notes	Images
Ameiurus	A. hazenensis	An articulated skeleton.	A bullhead catfish.	
Fundulus	F. nevadensis	Numerous articulated skeletons	A killifish. One of the most common fish in the formation.	
Gasterosteus	G. doryssus	Numerous articulated skeletons	A stickleback related to the three-spined stickleback. One of the most common fish in the formation.	
Oncorhynchus	O. belli	An articulated skeleton.	A Pacific trout potentially related to the cutthroat trout.	

=== Amphibians ===
Genus	Species	Material	Notes	Images
Anura indet.		An articulated skeleton.	A large-sized frog, most likely a member of the genus Rana.	

=== Reptiles ===
Genus	Species	Material	Notes	Images
Colubridae indet.		An articulated skeleton.	A colubrid snake, initially identified as Coluber sp. Appears to have had piscivorous tendencies and may have died choking on a stickleback, so it may represent a garter snake instead.	

=== Birds ===
Genus	Species	Material	Notes	Images
Passeriformes indet.		Two nearly complete skeletons	A perching bird.	
Podicepidae indet.	Podicepidae sp. A	Articulated skeleton	A grebe that appears to have fed on sticklebacks.	
Podicepidae indet.	Podicepidae sp. B	Articulated skeleton	A grebe that appears to have fed on sticklebacks.	

=== Mammals ===
Genus	Species	Material	Notes	Images
Sciurus	S. olsoni	Articulated skeleton	A squirrel. The presence of this species fills in a major gap in the presence of fossil Sciurus on the North American continent.	

== See also ==
- List of fossiliferous stratigraphic units in Nevada
- Paleontology in Nevada
