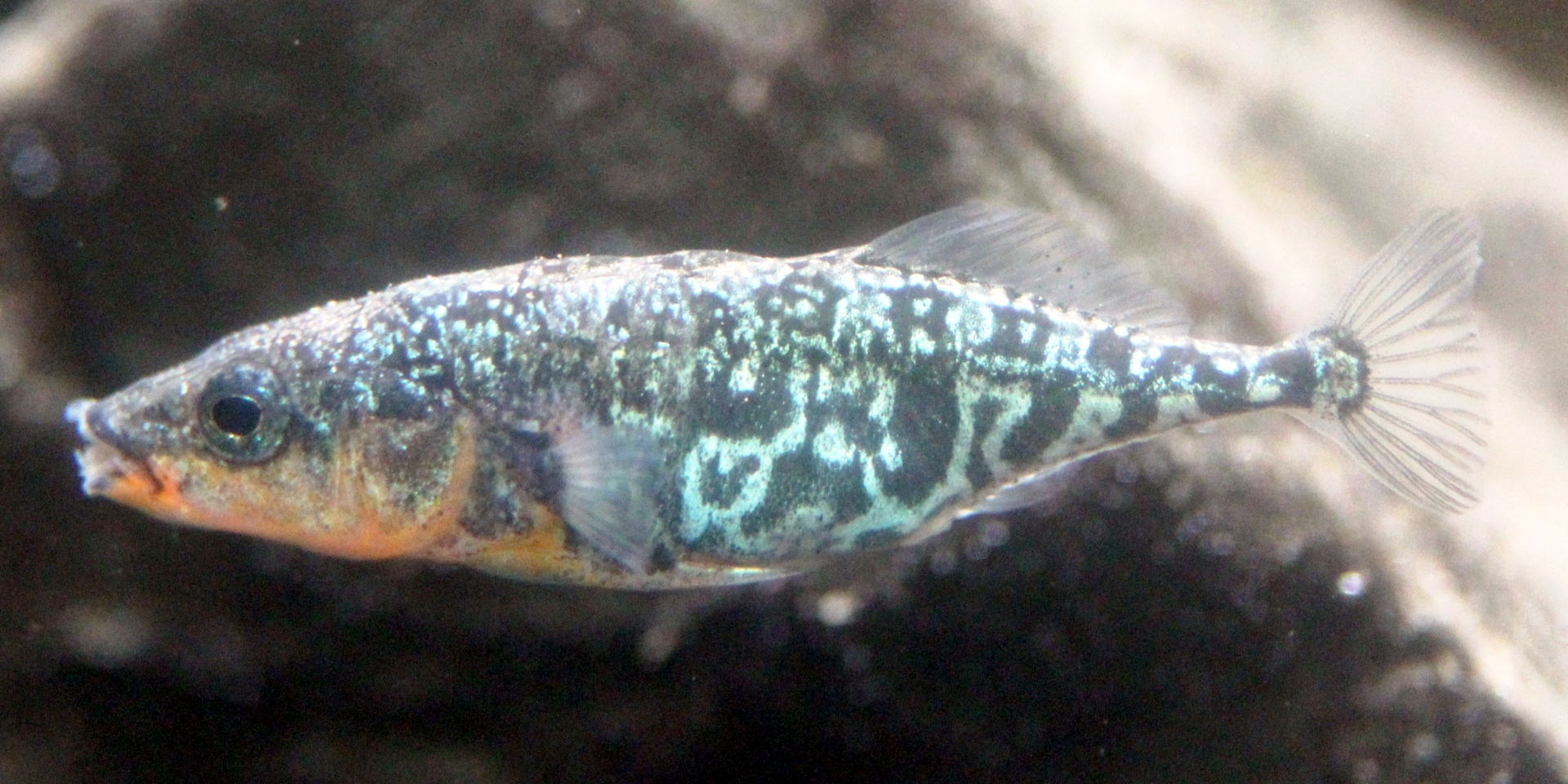

Scientific classification
- Kingdom: Animalia
- Phylum: Chordata
- Class: Actinopterygii
- Order: Perciformes
- Family: Gasterosteidae
- Genus: Gasterosteus
- Species: G. microcephalus

Binomial name
- Gasterosteus microcephalus Girard, 1854

Synonyms
- Gasterosteus aculeatus microcephalus Girard, 1854

= Smallhead stickleback =

Species of fish

The smallhead stickleback (Gasterosteus microcephalus), or resident threespined stickleback, is a fish species, which widespread in the basin of the Pacific Ocean: Japan, also Mexico. Freshwater demersal fish, up to 5.5 cm (2.2 in) length. Habits small streams, where feeds on aquatic insects and other invertebrates. This taxon is regarded by some authorities as a synonym of the three-spined stickleback (G. aculeatus), and others treat it as a subspecies of the three-spined stickleback, G. a. microcephalus.
