= Gasterosteus nipponicus =

Conservation status
- Least Concern (IUCN 3.1)

Scientific classification
- Kingdom: Animalia
- Phylum: Chordata
- Class: Actinopterygii
- Order: Perciformes
- Family: Gasterosteidae
- Genus: Gasterosteus
- Species: G. nipponicus

Binomial name
- Gasterosteus nipponicus Higuchi, Sakai & A. Goto, 2014

Species of fish

Gasterosteus nipponicus is a species of ray-finned fish belonging to the family Gasterosteidae, the sticklebacks. This species is found in the northwestern Pacific Ocean.

== Taxonomy ==
Gasterosteus nipponicus first formally described in 2014 by Masahito Higuchi, Harumi Sakai and Akira Goto with the type locality given Usujiri, Minamikayabe, Hokkaido in Japan. Higachi and Goto had previously identified a lineage of three-spined sticklebacks (G. aculateus) from Japan which had substantial differences from the other lineages, both morphological and genetic, and which genetic studies showed rarely hybridised with sympatric populations of threes-spined sticklebacks.

== Description ==
Gasterosteus nipponicus differs from the three-spined stickleback in that the lateral plates are complete and that they suddenly reduce in size over the anus, the depth of lateral plate over the anus less than 60% of the depth of the deepest plate. In addition the caudal keels are thin and membrane-like. This species has a maximum published standard length of 7.2 cm (2.8 in) in males and 7.9 cm (3.1 in) in males.

== Distribution and habitat ==
Gasterosteus nipponicus is found in the northwestern Pacific Ocean. Here it occurs in along the Sea of Japan coats of Japan from Kyushu to Hokkaido, from Chiba Prefecture to Hokkaido on the eastern coast of Japan, along the northern coast of Hokkaido on the Sea of Okhotsk. It is also found along the southern and eastern coasts of the Korean Peninsula and north to Sakhalin. This is a benthopelagic fish which can be found in marine, brackish and fresh waters.
