= Techirghiol stickleback =

Conservation status
- Extinct (IUCN 3.1)

Scientific classification
- Kingdom: Animalia
- Phylum: Chordata
- Class: Actinopterygii
- Order: Perciformes
- Family: Gasterosteidae
- Genus: Gasterosteus
- Species: †G. crenobiontus

Binomial name
- †Gasterosteus crenobiontus Băcescu & R. F. Mayer, 1956

Synonyms
- Gasterosteus aculeatus crenobionta Băcescu & Mayer, 1956; Gasterosteus aculeatus crenobiontus Băcescu & Mayer, 1956

Extinct species of fish

The Techirghiol stickleback (Gasterosteus crenobiontus) was an endemic fish species, found in the streams inflowing to the coastal hypersaline Lake Techirghiol in southern Romania.

== Etymology ==
The species name derives from creno- (from the Greek krēnē, “spring”) and bionta, likely an adjectival form of biont, meaning “an individual organism.” Together, the name refers to the freshwater springs feeding Lake Techirghiol in Romania, to which the species was endemic before its extinction through introgressive hybridization with Gasterosteus aculeatus in the mid‑20th century.

== Lifestyle ==
It was a freshwater benthopelagic fish, up to 6.5 centimetres (2.6 in) SL in length.

== Extinction ==
It is considered extinct due to hybridization with the three-spined stickleback following irrigation which allowed the two taxa to mix by diluting the hypersaline water barrier which separated them. The last known occurrence of the species was in the 1960s.
