= Leirvogsvatn =

- Location within Iceland
- Location: Iceland
- Coordinates: 64°11′48″N 21°27′14″W
- Type: lake
- Primary inflows: Leirvogsvatn River
- Surface area: 1.2 square kilometres (0.46 sq mi)
- Max. depth: 16 metres (52 ft)
- Surface elevation: 211 metres (692 ft)

Leirvogsvatn (Icelandic pronunciation: [ˈleirˌvɔksˌvahtn̥]) is a small lake, located about 23 kilometres (14 mi) northeast of Reykjavík, Iceland. It lies along Route 36. Located at 211 metres (692 ft) above sea level, it has an area of 1.2 square kilometres (0.46 sq mi) with a maximum depth of 16 metres (52 ft). Fed by the Leirvogsvatn River, the lake is the subject of a legend in the form of a horse-shaped monster. The lake is known to contain populations of Gasterosteus islandicus.
