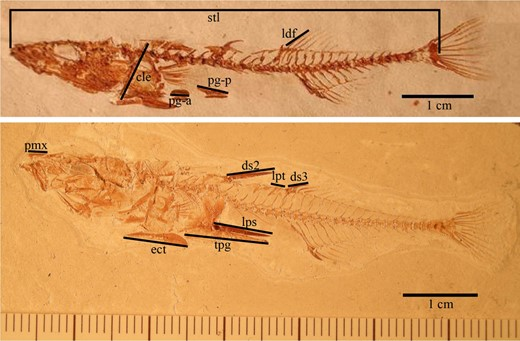
- Lineage I (top) and initial Lineage II (bottom) morphs of G. doryssus

Scientific classification
- Kingdom: Animalia
- Phylum: Chordata
- Class: Actinopterygii
- Order: Perciformes
- Family: Gasterosteidae
- Genus: Gasterosteus
- Species: †G. doryssus

Binomial name
- †Gasterosteus doryssus (Jordan, 1907)

Synonyms
- Merriamella doryssa Jordan, 1907; Gasterosteus apodus Mural, 1973

= Gasterosteus doryssus =

Gasterosteus doryssus Temporal range: Late Miocene (Tortonian), 10.7–9.75 Ma

Extinct species of fish

Gasterosteus doryssus is an extinct species of freshwater stickleback fish that inhabited inland freshwater habitats of the North American Great Basin during the Miocene. It is known from thousands of articulated fossil skeletons, comprising various age classes and two different ecomorphs, discovered in diatomite deposits of the Truckee Formation near Hazen, Nevada.

G. doryssus inhabited Lake Truckee, a predecessor to Lake Lahontan. Lake Truckee was subject to seasonal diatom blooms that would settle to the lake bottom to form diatomite, fossilizing any other animals that died during the season. This seasonal diatomite deposition provides an exquisite record of the annual dynamics of this ecosystem over several millennia, including a time series of the evolution of G. doryssus over 100,000 years and the eco-evolutionary dynamics that drove it. The time series of G. doryssus fossils has been used to provide evidence for and against specific evolutionary models, due to providing a comprehensive look at evolution within a geologically short period that is still significantly longer than anything observable by modern humans.

== Evolution ==
G. doryssus was closely related to and resembled the modern three-spined stickleback (G. aculeatus), which is found off the Pacific coast and associated freshwater systems. It is thought that during the Miocene, the Sierra Nevada mountains may have been lower, allowing for some contiguous freshwater connections between the Pacific coast and the Great Basin, through which the ancestral stickleback population may have dispersed inland. Further uplift of the mountains may have cut off these two populations, isolating the inland sticklebacks.

=== Eco-evolutionary dynamics ===
As with the modern three-spined stickleback, G. doryssus was susceptible to rapid evolution in response to environmental change, which is visible through the morphological changes seen in fossils of the species over the formation's deposition. The isolation of G. doryssus from coastal sticklebacks, in an ecosystem with few predators, led to the species as a whole developing much weaker armor than that seen in the modern three-spined stickleback. In addition, within Lake Truckee, G. doryssus evolved two different ecomorphs, which may potentially represent distinct species under a modern taxonomic classification, adapted to different habitats and feeding styles: a nearshore, benthic, predatory morph (Lineage II) with slightly more armor and an offshore limnetic, planktivorous morph with weak armor (Lineage I). This benthic-limnetic division occurs among modern lake-dwelling sticklebacks today, albeit only on five lakes on islands in British Columbia. After nearly 93,000 years of coexistence, the planktivorous Lineage I sticklebacks were replaced by the armored Lineage II sticklebacks as the latter expanded further into the lake, but afterwards, within a period of 5,000 years, the Lineage II sticklebacks started to also evolve planktivory and reduced armor. Lineage II sticklebacks saw total reduction of the pelvis, much as with certain modern stickleback populations, which is thought to be due to the gene Pitx1.

After several millennia of total dominance of the Lineage II sticklebacks, and shortly before the end of Truckee Formation deposition, G. doryssus completely disappeared from the formation and was replaced by the extinct killifish Fundulus nevadensis. The sudden appearance of F. nevadensis and the dramatic drop in G. doryssus populations occurred on a rapid timescale comparable to that of modern biological invasions.

The evolutionary dynamics provide evidence for both gradual evolution (the gradual development of planktivory over time) and punctuated equilibrium (the sudden loss of the pelvis due to a single mutation).

== Taxonomy ==
Gasterosteus doryssus was originally described by David Starr Jordan within its own monotypic genus, Merriamella (named for Clinton Hart Merriam), which he mistook for an extinct silverside. Shortly after, Oliver Perry Hay identified fossil sticklebacks from the same formation, which he named Gasterosteus williamsoni leptosomus. In a re-analysis, Jordan found both these species to be the same, and identified all sticklebacks from the formation as Gasterosteus doryssus. The species Gasterosteus apodus, coined for the Lineage II populations that saw a reduced pelvis, is now thought to be synonymous with G. doryssus.

The extinct Devonian-aged gastropod Merriamites was originally named Merriamella, but had to be renamed due to Merriamella being preoccupied by the original genus name of G. apodus.
