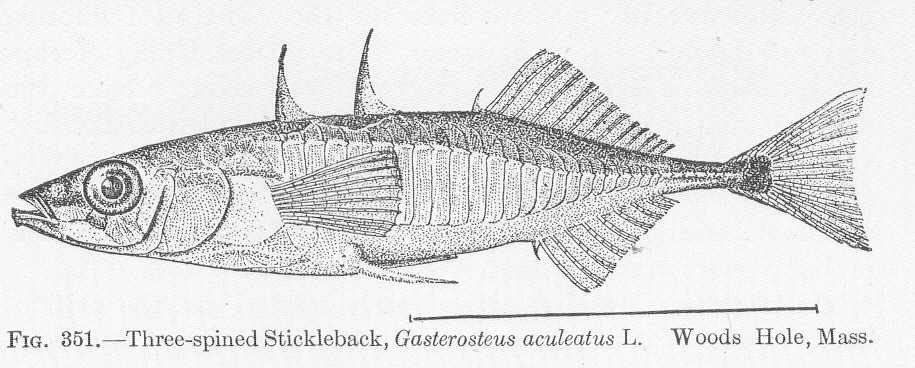
- Specimen drawing of a sister species, Gasterosteus aculeatus

Conservation status
- Least Concern (IUCN 3.1)

Scientific classification
- Kingdom: Animalia
- Phylum: Chordata
- Class: Actinopterygii
- Order: Perciformes
- Family: Gasterosteidae
- Genus: Gasterosteus
- Species: G. islandicus

Binomial name
- Gasterosteus islandicus Sauvage, 1874

= Icelandic threespine stickleback =

Species of fish

The Icelandic threespine stickleback (Gasterosteus islandicus) is a freshwater fish, and one of the few vertebrate species endemic to Iceland. In some literature it is considered as a subspecies of G. aculeatus, though several authorities offer it full species status. It was first described by French biologist Henri Émile Sauvage in 1874.

== Distribution ==
The Icelandic threespine stickleback is known from at least four different lakes in Iceland, including Þingvallavatn, Hreðavatn, Frostastaðavatn, and Mývatn.

== Description ==
The species is differentiated from other sticklebacks by having a deep notch on the anterior margin of the pelvic girdle. As opposed to other members of the genus, the Icelandic threespine stickleback has a trunk with 2-15 scutes, sometimes including scutes forming a lateral keel on the caudal peduncle or with the keel being absent. In the various lakes it occurs in, there are morphological differences reported between individuals depending on the local substrates (mud, gravel, lava, etc.), especially in Þingvallavatn.
