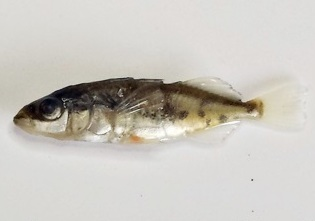
- Blackspotted stickleback

Conservation status
- Least Concern (IUCN 3.1)

Scientific classification
- Kingdom: Animalia
- Phylum: Chordata
- Class: Actinopterygii
- Order: Perciformes
- Family: Gasterosteidae
- Genus: Gasterosteus
- Species: G. wheatlandi

Binomial name
- Gasterosteus wheatlandi Putnam, 1867

= Blackspotted stickleback =

Species of fish

The blackspotted stickleback (Gasterosteus wheatlandi) is species of ray-finned fish belonging to the family Gasterosteidae, the sticklebacks. This fish is found in the western Atlantic from the coasts of Newfoundland (Canada) to Massachusetts (United States). This is a benthopelagic species of marine and brackish waters, rarely entering freshwater, which remains near the shore. It is frequently associated with floating vegetation. The male builds a nest, in which the females deposit eggs and the male guards and aerates them. It is a small fish which reaches a maximum published total length of 7.6 cm (3.0 in), although 3.5 cm (1.4 in) is more typical. The specific name honors Richard H. Wheatland who was the Cabinet Keeper (and collector of fishes and reptiles), for the Essex County Natural History Society of Salem, Massachusetts and who collected type of this species in 1859.
