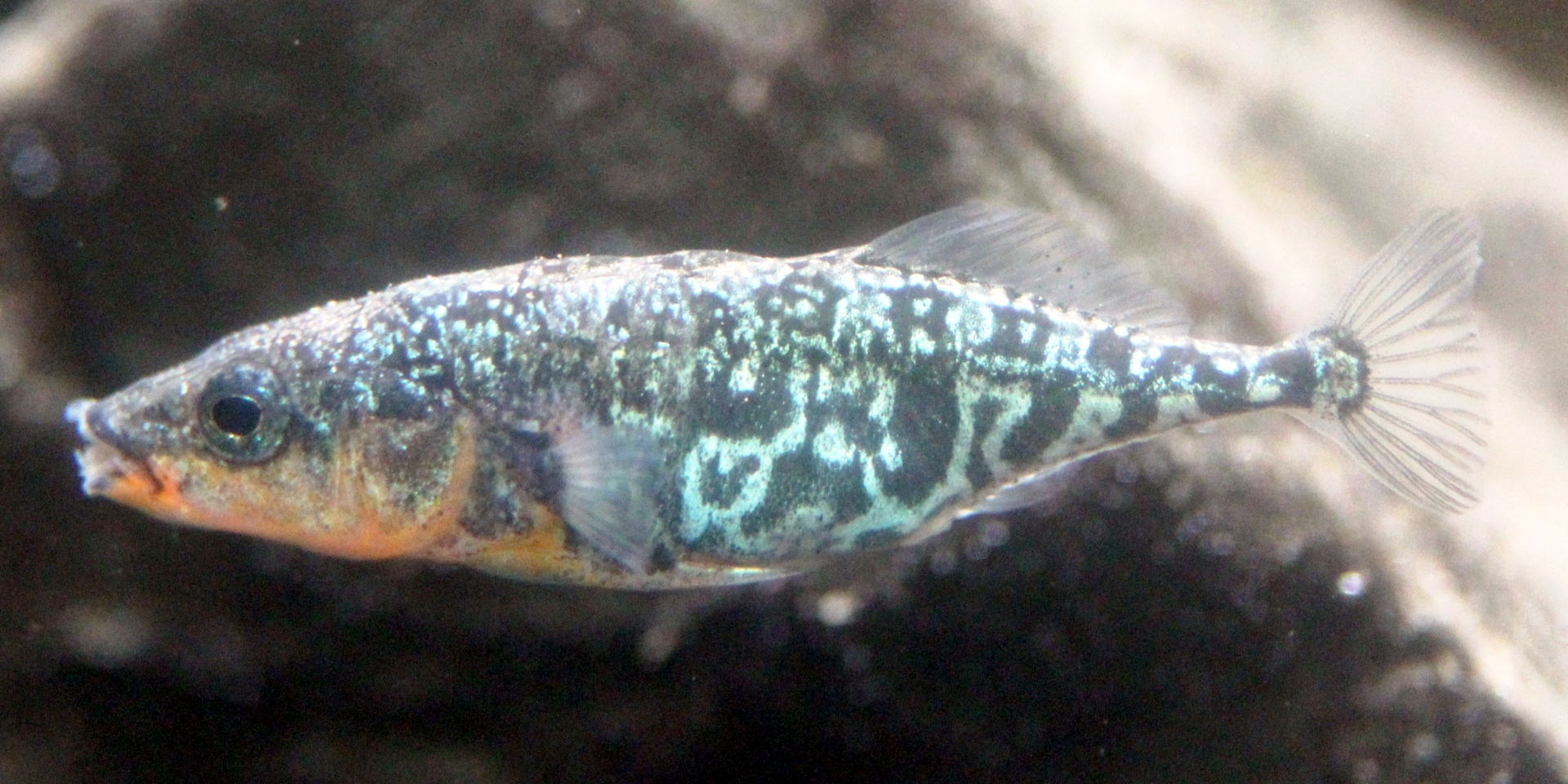
- Gasterosteus microcephalus, the Smallhead stickleback.
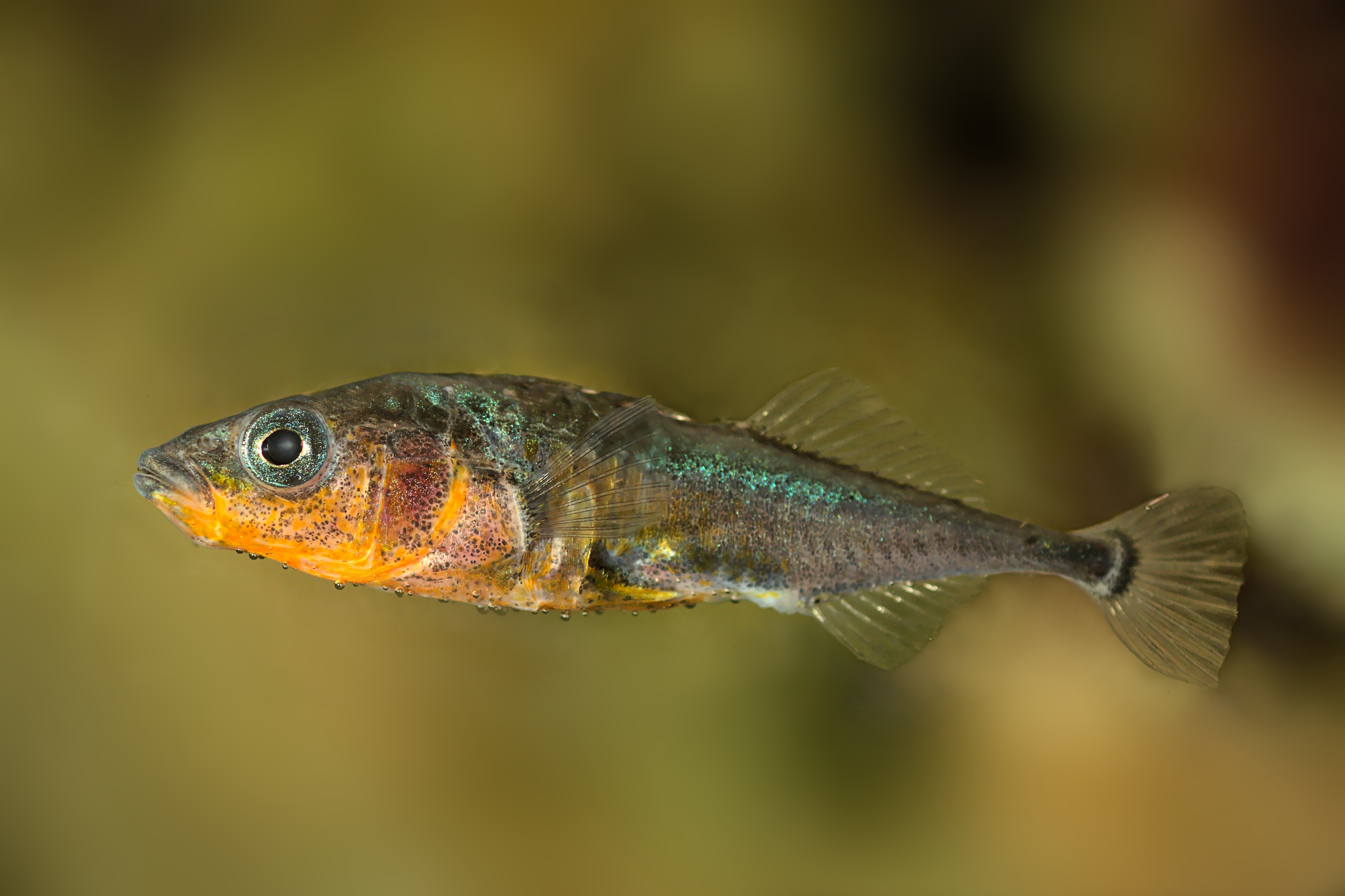
- Gasterosteus aculeatus, the Three-spined stickleback

Scientific classification
- Kingdom: Animalia
- Phylum: Chordata
- Class: Actinopterygii
- Division: Teleostei
- Order: Perciformes
- Family: Gasterosteidae
- Genus: Gasterosteus; Linnaeus, 1758

Type species
- Gasterosteus aculeatus Linnaeus, 1758

Synonyms
- Obolarius Tilesius, 1811; Gasteracanthus Pallas, 1814; Leiurus Swainson, 1839; Gladiunculus Jordan & Evermann, 1927

= Gasterosteus =

Gasterosteus Temporal range: Middle Miocene–present

Genus of fishes

Gasterosteus is a genus of Perciform fish that belongs to the family Gasterosteidae (sticklebacks). These fishes can be found in the Holarctic region with a circumpolar distribution being found to inhabit freshwater, brackish water and marine habitats.

== Taxonomy ==
=== Evolution ===
The oldest known members of this genus belongs to G. aculeatus being found in the Monterey Formation of California, USA probably from the Alta Mira Shale of the Palos Verdes Peninsula. These fossils essentially resemble modern G. aculeatus. It’s fossils are dated to be around 13.0 to 13.3 million years old placing it within the Serravallian age of the Middle-Late Miocene epoch.

=== Species ===
There are currently five recognized species in this genus that are extant and another five that are extinct. According to fish species lists by William N. Eschmeyer, an American ichthyologist and founder of the Catalog of Fishes, there were only two species with three subspecies in the genus; G. wheatlandi and G. aculeatus with its three subspecies G. aculeatus aculeatus, G. aculeatus microcephalus and G. aculeatus williamsoni. The species complex of G. aculeatus is well-known and has been extensively studied for this complex exhibiting a wide array of morphological, physiological, ethological, reproductive and genetic variations.

The list of species are found below:

- †Gasterosteus abnormis Gretchina, 1981 (middle Miocene of Sakhalin, Russia)
- Gasterosteus aculeatus Linnaeus, 1758 (Three-spined stickleback)
- †Gasterosteus crenobiontus Băcescu & R. Mayer, 1956 (Techirghiol stickleback)
- †Gasterosteus doryssus (Jordan, 1907) (=Merriamella doryssa Jordan, 1907, G. apodus Mural, 1973) (late Miocene of Nevada, USA)
- Gasterosteus islandicus Sauvage, 1874 (Iceland stickleback)
- †Gasterosteus kamoensis Nazarkin, Yabumoto & Urabe, 2013 (Late Miocene of Japan)
- Gasterosteus microcephalus Girard, 1854 (Smallhead stickleback)
- Gasterosteus nipponicus Higuchi, Sakai & A. Goto, 2014
- †Gasterosteus orientalis Sychevskaya, 1981 (middle Miocene of Kamchatka, Russia)
- Gasterosteus wheatlandi Putnam, 1867 (Black-spotted stickleback)

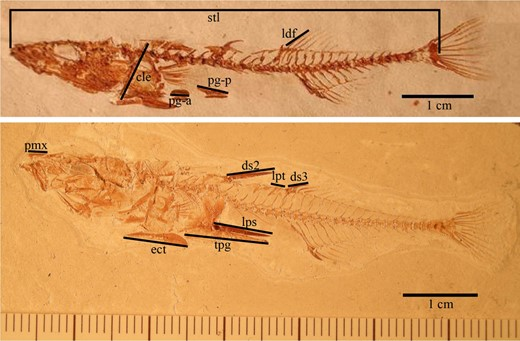
Gasterosteus doryssus, a fossil freshwater species from Nevada
