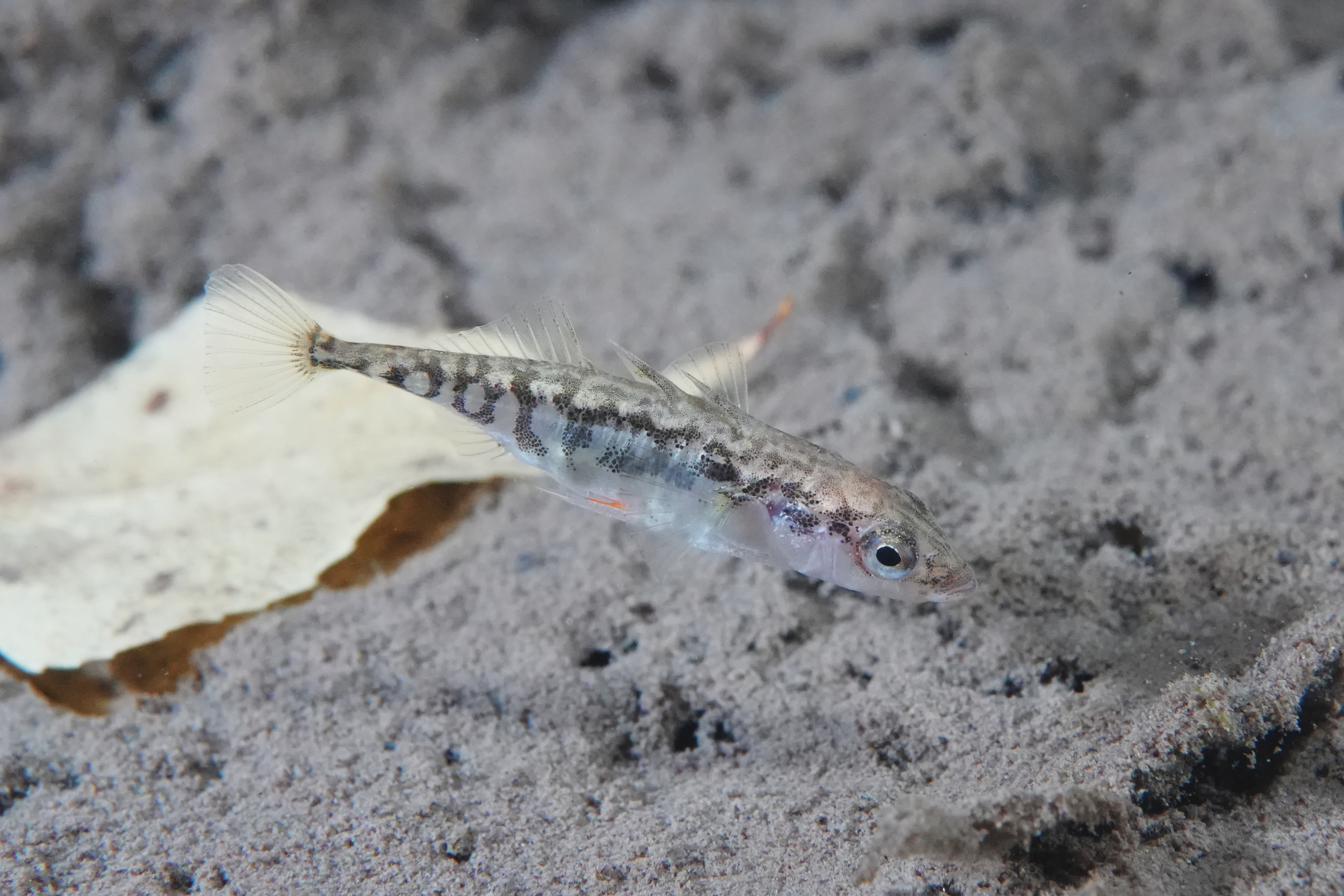

Conservation status
- Least Concern (IUCN 3.1)

Scientific classification
- Kingdom: Animalia
- Phylum: Chordata
- Class: Actinopterygii
- Division: Teleostei
- Order: Perciformes
- Family: Gasterosteidae
- Genus: Gasterosteus
- Species: G. aculeatus

Binomial name
- Gasterosteus aculeatus Linnaeus, 1758
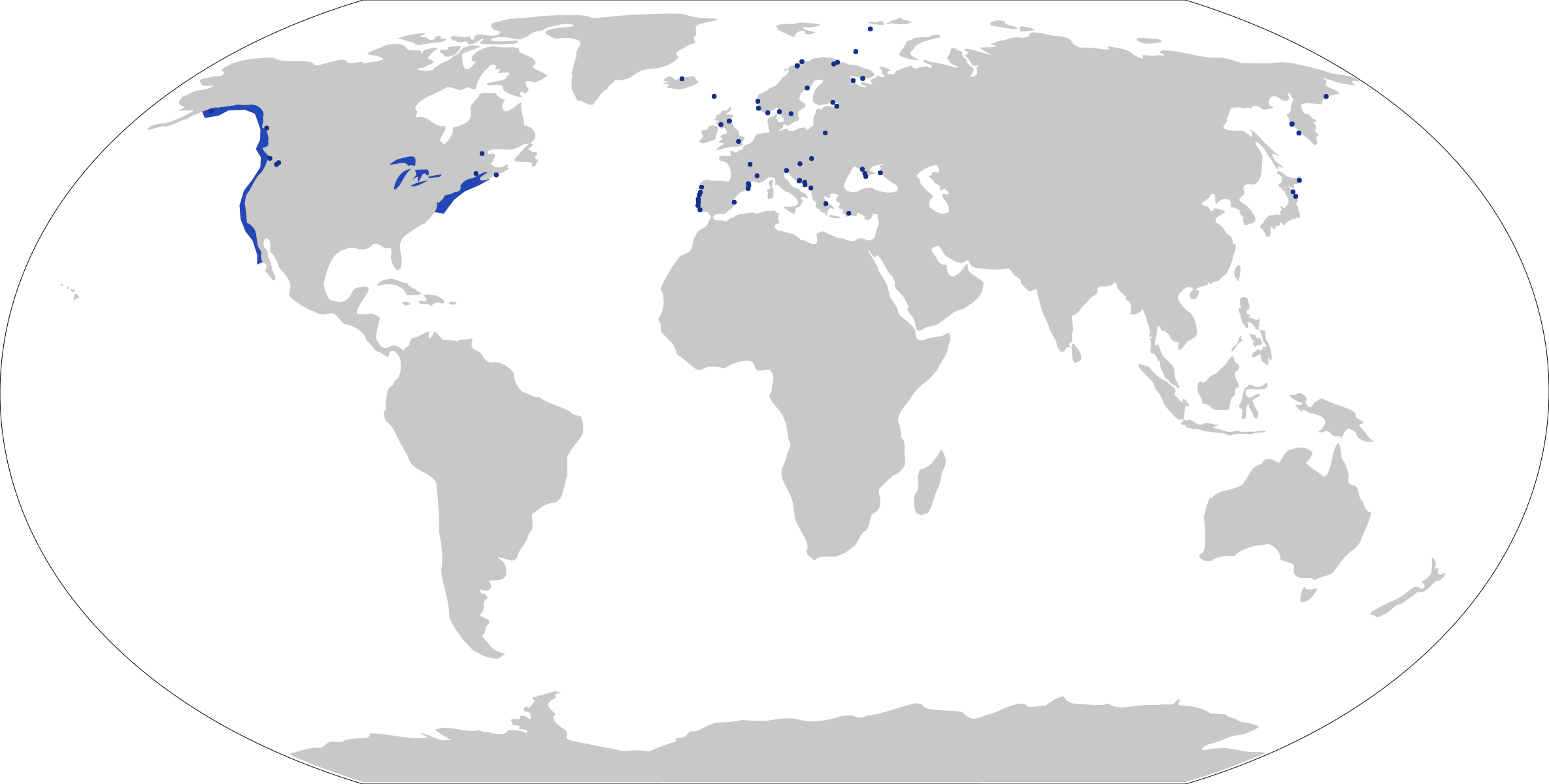
- Distribution of Gasterosteus aculeatus, with observations (dots; based on) and distribution (shaded area; based on https://nas.er.usgs.gov/queries/factsheet.aspx?SpeciesID=702)

Synonyms
- List: Gasterosteus aculeatus aculeatus Linnaeus, 1758; Leiurus aculeatus (Linnaeus, 1758); Gasterosteus bispinosus Walbaum, 1792; Gasterosteus teraculeatus Lacépède, 1801; Gasteracanthus cataphractus Pallas, 1814; Gasterosteus cataphractus (Pallas, 1814); Gasterosteus biaculeatus Mitchill, 1815; Gasterosteus gymnurus Cuvier, 1829; Gasterosteus aculeatus gymnurus Cuvier, 1829; Gasterosteus semiarmatus Cuvier, 1829; Gasterosteus niger Cuvier, 1829; Gasterosteus trachurus Cuvier, 1829; Gasterosteus aculeatus trachurus Cuvier, 1829; Gasterosteus leiurus Cuvier, 1829; Gasterosteus aculeatus leiurus Cuvier, 1829; Gasterosteus semiloricatus Cuvier, 1829; Gasterosteus argyropomus Cuvier, 1829; Gasterosteus tetracanthus Cuvier, 1829; Gasterosteus brachycentrus Cuvier, 1829; Gasterosteus noveboracensis Cuvier, 1829; Gasterosteus obolarius Cuvier, 1829r; Gasterosteus spinulosus Yarrell, 1835; Gasterosteus dimidiatus Reinhardt, 1837; Gasterosteus loricatus Reinhardt, 1837; Gasterosteus biarmatus Krynicki, 1840; Gasterosteus ponticus Nordmann, 1840; Gasterosteus neoboracensis DeKay, 1842; Gasterosteus nemausensis Crespon, 1844; Gasterosteus quadrispinosa Crespon, 1844; Gasterosteus cuvieri Girard, 1850; Gasterosteus williamsoni Girard, 1854; Gasterosteus aculeatus williamsoni Girard, 1854; Gasterosteus inopinatus Girard, 1854; Gasterosteus plebeius Girard, 1854; Gasterosteus serratus Ayres, 1855; Gasterosteus insculptus Richardson, 1855; Gasterosteus intermedius Girard, 1856; Gasterosteus pugetti Girard, 1856; Gasterosteus neustrianus Blanchard, 1866; Gasterosteus argentatissimus Blanchard, 1866; Gasterosteus elegans Blanchard, 1866; Gasterosteus bailloni Blanchard, 1866; Gasterosteus texanus Sauvage, 1874; Gasterosteus algeriensis Sauvage, 1874; Gasterosteus aculeatus algeriensis Sauvage, 1874; Gasterosteus suppositus Sauvage, 1874; Gasterosteus atkinsii Bean, 1879; Gastrosteus hologymnus Regan, 1909; Gasterosteus hologymnus Regan, 1909; Gasterosteus santaeannae Regan, 1909; Gasterosteus aculeatus santaeannae Regan, 1909; Gasterosteus aculeatus messinicus Stephanidis, 1971

= Three-spined stickleback =

Three-spined stickleback Temporal range: Middle Miocene to present, 13.0–0 Ma

Species of fish

The three-spined stickleback (Gasterosteus aculeatus) is a fish native to most inland and coastal waters north of 30°N. It has long been a subject of scientific study for many reasons. It shows great morphological variation throughout its range, ideal for questions about evolution and population genetics. Many populations are anadromous (they live in seawater but breed in fresh or brackish water) and very tolerant of changes in salinity, a subject of interest to physiologists. It displays elaborate breeding behavior (defending a territory, building a nest, taking care of the eggs and fry) and it can be social (living in shoals outside the breeding season) making it a popular subject of inquiry in fish ethology and behavioral ecology. Its antipredator adaptations, host-parasite interactions, sensory physiology, reproductive physiology, and endocrinology have also been much studied. Facilitating these studies is the fact that the three-spined stickleback is easy to find in nature and easy to keep in aquaria.

== Evolution ==
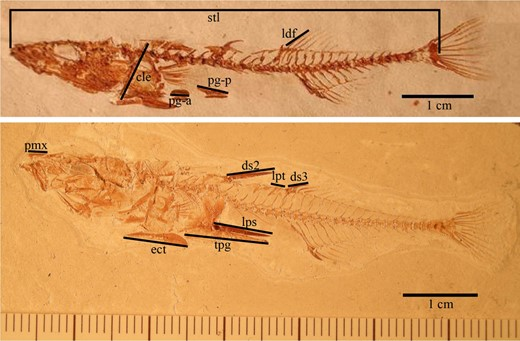
The fossil species G. doryssus is closely related to G. aculeatus, and had a very similar tendency for rapid evolution.

The three-spined stickleback appears to be a rather old species that has remained morphologically unchanged for more than 10 million years. The oldest record of the species is from the Alta Mira Shale of the Monterey Formation of California, which preserves an articulated skeleton that appears essentially identical to the modern G. aculeatus complex. A slightly younger specimen is known from diatomite deposits from Lompoc that also belong to the Monterey Formation. Both specimens are known from marine deposits, suggesting a marine or anadromous lifestyle. The presence of the three-spined stickleback in the Miocene suggests that the three-spined stickleback complex must have diverged from the blackspotted stickleback prior to this point.

The iconic evolutionary traits of the three-spined stickleback, including rapid evolution in isolated environments, reduction of armor and pelvis, and ecological divisions into different niches, appear to have been a longstanding tendency of the Gasterosteus lineage. These traits are all present in a fossil stickleback, Gasterosteus doryssus, known from Miocene-aged freshwater deposits of the Truckee Formation in Nevada, US, which saw rapid evolution and morphological change over a period of several thousand years.

== Description ==
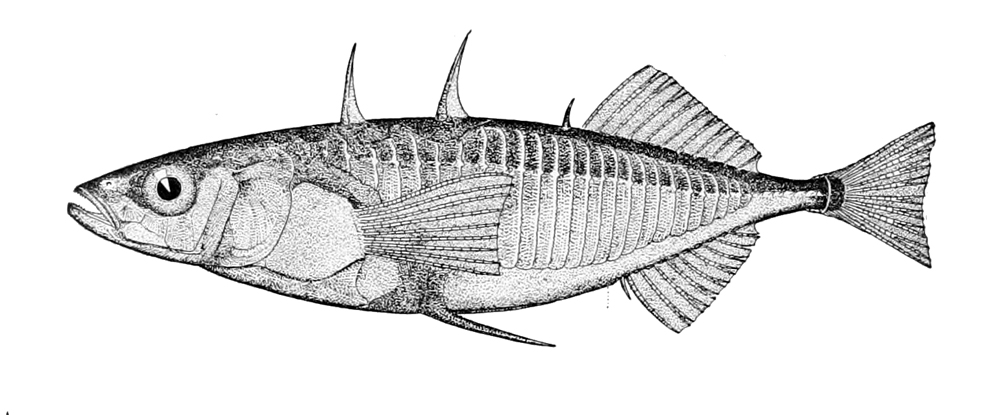

This species can occasionally reach lengths of 8 cm (3.1 in), but lengths of 3–4 centimetres (1.2–1.6 in) at maturity are more common. The body is laterally compressed. The base of the tail is slender. The caudal fin has 12 rays. The dorsal fin has 10–14 rays; in front of it are the three spines that give the fish its name (though some individuals may have only two or four). The third spine (the one closest to the dorsal fin) is much shorter than the other two. The back of each spine is joined to the body by a thin membrane. The anal fin has eight to eleven rays. The pelvic fins consist of just a spine and one ray. All spines can be locked in an erect position, making the fish extremely hard to swallow by a predator. The pectoral fins are large, with 10 rays. The body bears no scales, but is protected by bony plates on the back, flanks, and belly. Only one ventral plate is present, but the number of flank plates varies greatly across the distribution range and across habitat types (see below); it is normally higher in marine populations (some freshwater populations may in fact lack lateral plates altogether).

Dorsal coloration varies, but tends towards a drab olive or a silvery green, sometimes with brown mottling. The flanks and belly are silvery. In males during the breeding season, the eyes become blue and the lower head, throat, and anterior belly turn bright red. The throat and belly of breeding females can turn slightly pink. A few populations, however, have breeding males which are all black or all white.

== Habitat and distribution ==
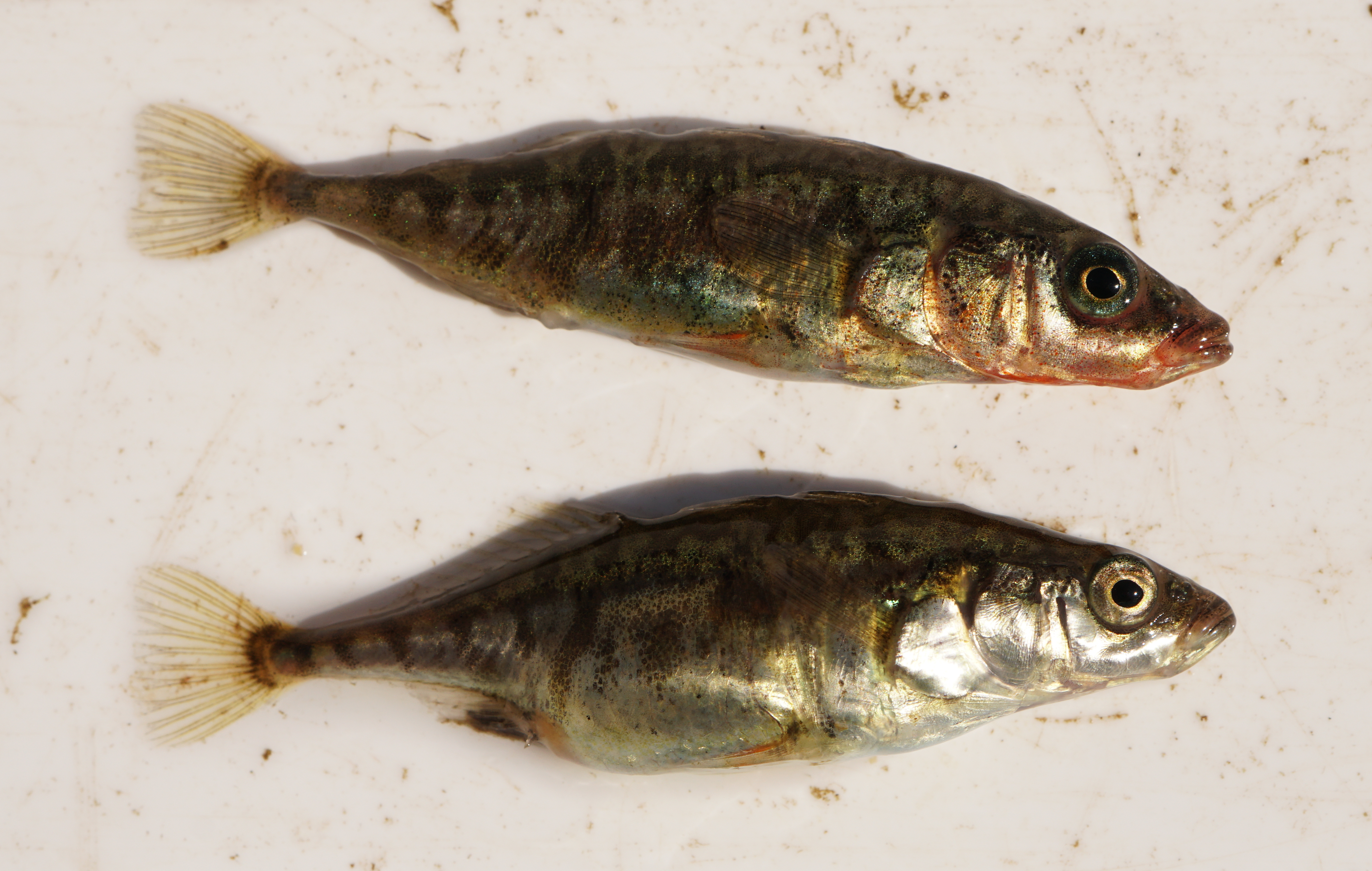
Male (reddish) and a gravid female three-spined stickleback

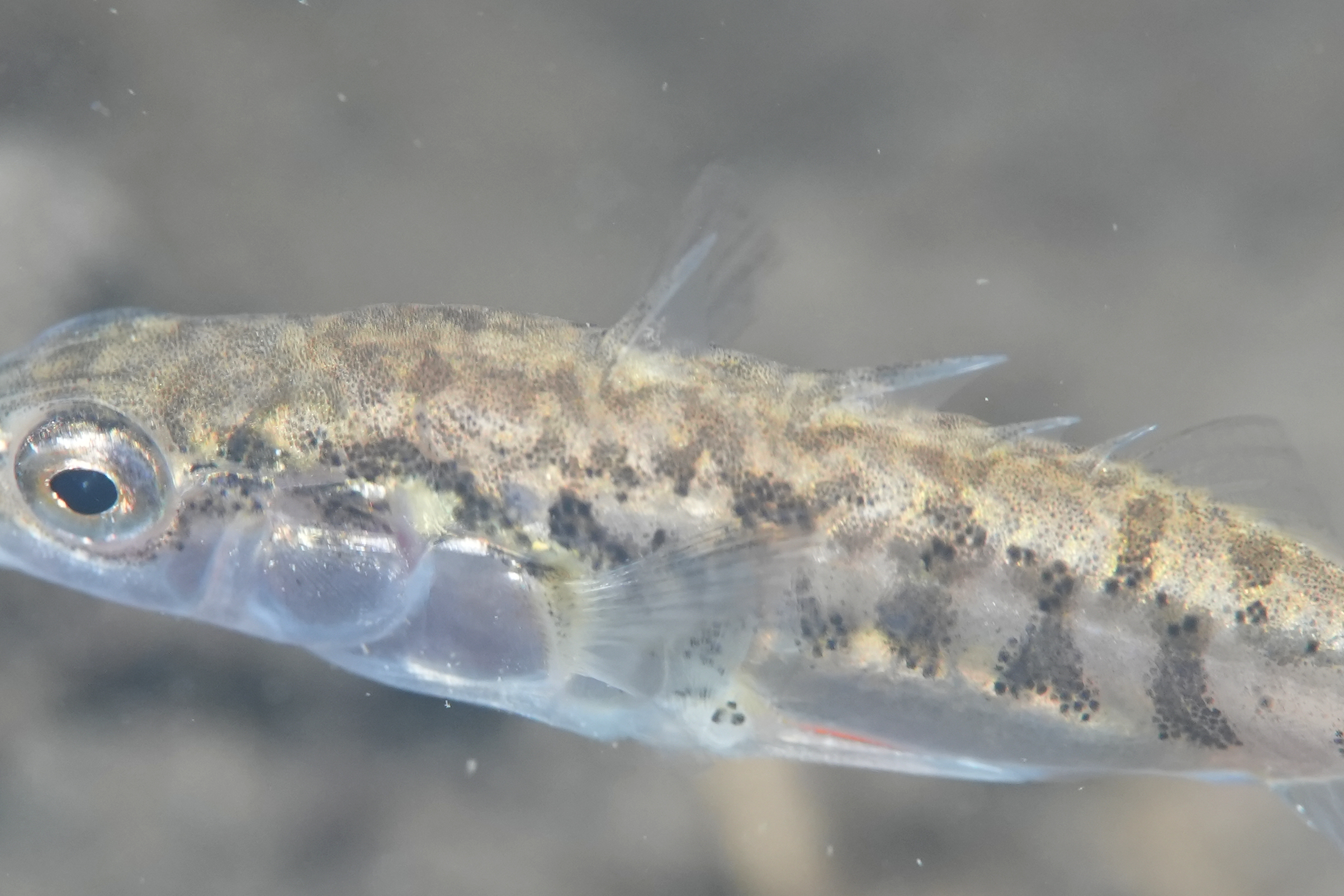
Three-spined sticklebacks may rarely have four spines.

The three-spined stickleback is found only in the Northern Hemisphere, where it usually inhabits coastal waters or freshwater bodies. It can live in either fresh, brackish, or salt water. It prefers slow-flowing water with areas of emerging vegetation. It can be found in ditches, ponds, lakes, backwaters, quiet rivers, sheltered bays, marshes, and harbours.

In North America, it ranges along the East Coast from Chesapeake Bay to the southern half of Baffin Island and the western shore of Hudson Bay, and along the West Coast from southern California to the western shore of Alaska and the Aleutian Islands. It can be found throughout Europe between 35 and 70°N. Locally present in the Volga River basin. In Asia, the distribution stretches from Japan and the Korean peninsula to the Bering Straits.

Its distribution could be said to be circumpolar were it not for the fact that it is absent from the north coast of Siberia, the north coast of Alaska, and the Arctic islands of Canada.

== Variation in morphology and distribution ==
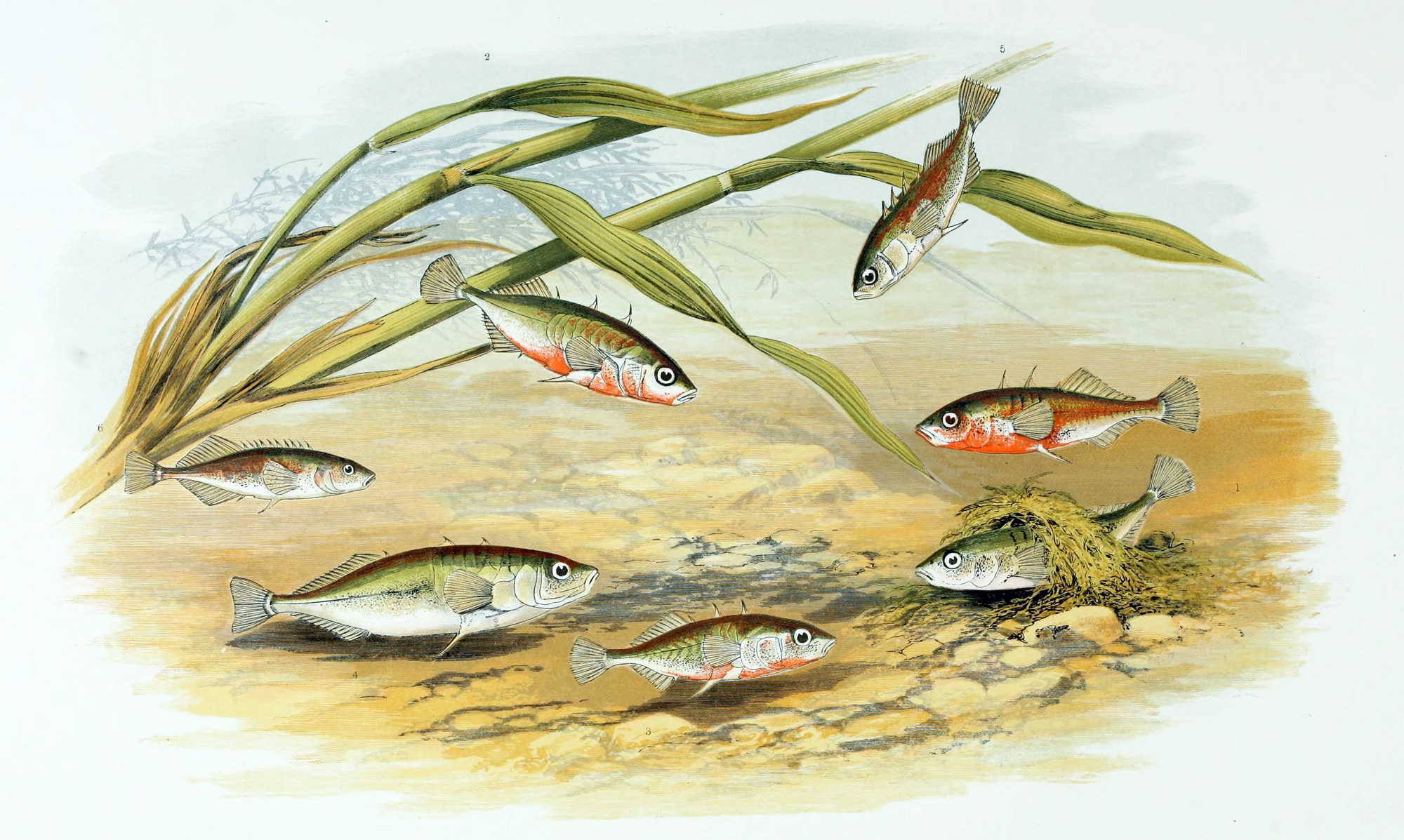

The head of a threespine stickleback reconstructed into a 3D mesh from a microCT scan. This individual was from a freshwater stream population on Vancouver Island, BC. Many stickleback traits can vary a great deal between freshwater populations, including the number of bony lateral plates, a few of which can be seen towards the posterior edge of this mesh, and the number and length of gill rakers and pharyngeal teeth, which can be seen inside the mouth.

Three subspecies are recognized by the IUCN:

- G. a. aculeatus is found in most of the species range, and is the subspecies most strictly termed the three-spined stickleback; its common name in Britain is the tiddler, although "tittlebat" is also sometimes used.
- G. a. williamsoni, the unarmored threespine stickleback, is found only in North America; its recognised range is southern California, though isolated reports have been made of it occurring in British Columbia and Mexico;
- G. a. santaeannae, the Santa Ana stickleback, is also restricted to North America.

These subspecies actually represent three examples from the enormous range of morphological variation present within three-spined sticklebacks. Hybrids between some of these morphs show foraging disadvantages, a form of reinforcement in the course of speciation. This is evidence for speciation by reinforcement.

Overall these morphs fall into two rough categories, the anadromous and the freshwater forms:

The anadromous form spends most of its adult life eating plankton and fish in the sea, and returns to freshwater to breed. The adult fish are typically between 6 and 10 cm long, and have 30 to 40 lateral armour plates along their sides. They also have long dorsal and pelvic spines. The anadromous form is morphologically similar all around the Northern Hemisphere, such that anadromous fish from the Baltic, the Atlantic and the Pacific all resemble each other quite closely.

Three-spined stickleback populations are also found in freshwater lakes and streams. These populations were probably formed when anadromous fish started spending their entire lifecycle in fresh water, and thus evolved to live there all year round. Freshwater populations are extremely morphologically diverse, to the extent that many observers (and some taxonomists) would describe a new subspecies of three-spined stickleback in almost every lake in the Northern Hemisphere. One consistent difference between freshwater populations and their anadromous ancestors is the amount of body armour, as the majority of freshwater fish only have between none and 12 lateral armor plates, and shorter dorsal and pelvic spines. However, also large morphological differences occur between lakes. One major axis of variation is between populations found in deep, steep-sided lakes and those in small, shallow lakes. The fish in the deep lakes typically feed in the surface waters on plankton, and often have large eyes, with short, slim bodies and upturned jaws. Some researchers refer to this as the limnetic form. Fish from shallow lakes feed mainly on the lake bed, and are often long and heavy bodied with relatively horizontal jaws and small eyes. These populations are referred to as the benthic form.

Since each watershed was probably colonised separately by anadromous sticklebacks, morphologically similar populations in different watersheds or on different continents are widely believed to have evolved independently. A unique population is found in the meromictic Pink Lake in Gatineau Park, Quebec. Populations have been observed rapidly adapting to different conditions, such as in Lake Union, where sticklebacks have lost and regained armor plates in response to pollution from human activity around the watershed.

One aspect of this morphological variation is that a number of lakes contain both a limnetic and a benthic type, and these do not interbreed with each other. Evolutionary biologists often define species as populations that do not interbreed with each other (the biological species concept), thus the benthics and limnetics within each lake would constitute separate species. These species pairs are an excellent example of how adaptation to different environments (in this case feeding in the surface waters or on the lake bed) can generate new species. This process has come to be termed ecological speciation. This type of species pair is found in British Columbia. The lakes themselves only contain three-spined sticklebacks and cutthroat trout, and all are on islands. However, the pair in Hadley Lake on Lasqueti Island was destroyed in the mid-1980s by the introduction of a predatory catfish, and the pair in Enos Lake on Vancouver Island has started to interbreed and are no longer two distinct species. The two remaining pairs are on Texada Island, in Paxton Lake and Priest Lake, and they are listed as Endangered in the Canadian Species at Risk Act.

Other species pairs which consist of a well-armored marine form and a smaller, unarmored freshwater form are being studied in ponds and lakes in south-central Alaska that were once marine habitats such as those uplifted during the 1964 Alaska earthquake. The evolutionary dynamics of these species pairs are providing a model for the processes of speciation which has taken place in less than 20 years in at least one lake. In 1982, a chemical eradication program intended to make room for trout and salmon at Loberg Lake, Alaska, killed the resident freshwater populations of sticklebacks. Oceanic sticklebacks introduced through nearby Cook Inlet recolonized the lake. In just 12 years beginning in 1990, the frequency of the oceanic form dropped steadily, from 100% to 11%, while a variety with fewer plates increased to 75% of the population, with various intermediate forms making up another small fraction. This rapid evolution is thought to be possible through genetic variations that confer competitive advantages for survival in fresh water when conditions shift rapidly from salt to fresh water. However, the actual molecular basis of this evolution still remains unknown.

Although sticklebacks are found in many locations around the coasts of the Northern Hemisphere and are thus viewed by the IUCN as species of least concern, the unique evolutionary history encapsulated in many freshwater populations indicates further legal protection may be warranted.

== Diet ==
In its different forms or stages of life, the three-spined stickleback can be a bottom-feeder (most commonly chironomid larvae and amphipods) or a planktonic feeder in lakes or in the ocean; it can also consume terrestrial prey fallen to the surface. It can cannibalize eggs and fry.

== Life history ==
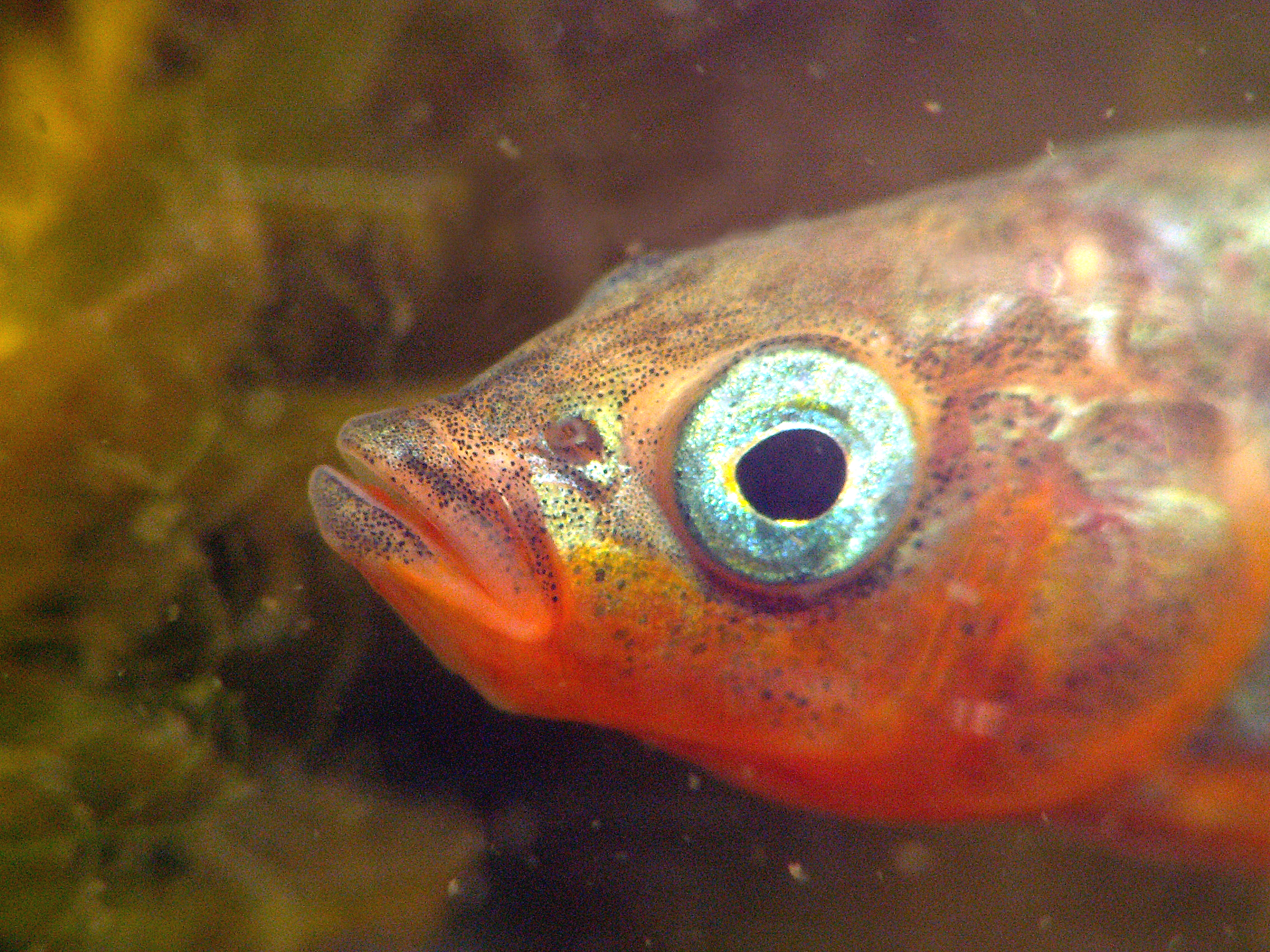
Male stickleback with red throat and shiny blue eye

Many populations take two years to mature and experience only one breeding season before dying, and some can take up to three years to reach maturity. However, some freshwater populations and populations at extreme latitudes can reach maturity in only one year.

== Reproduction ==
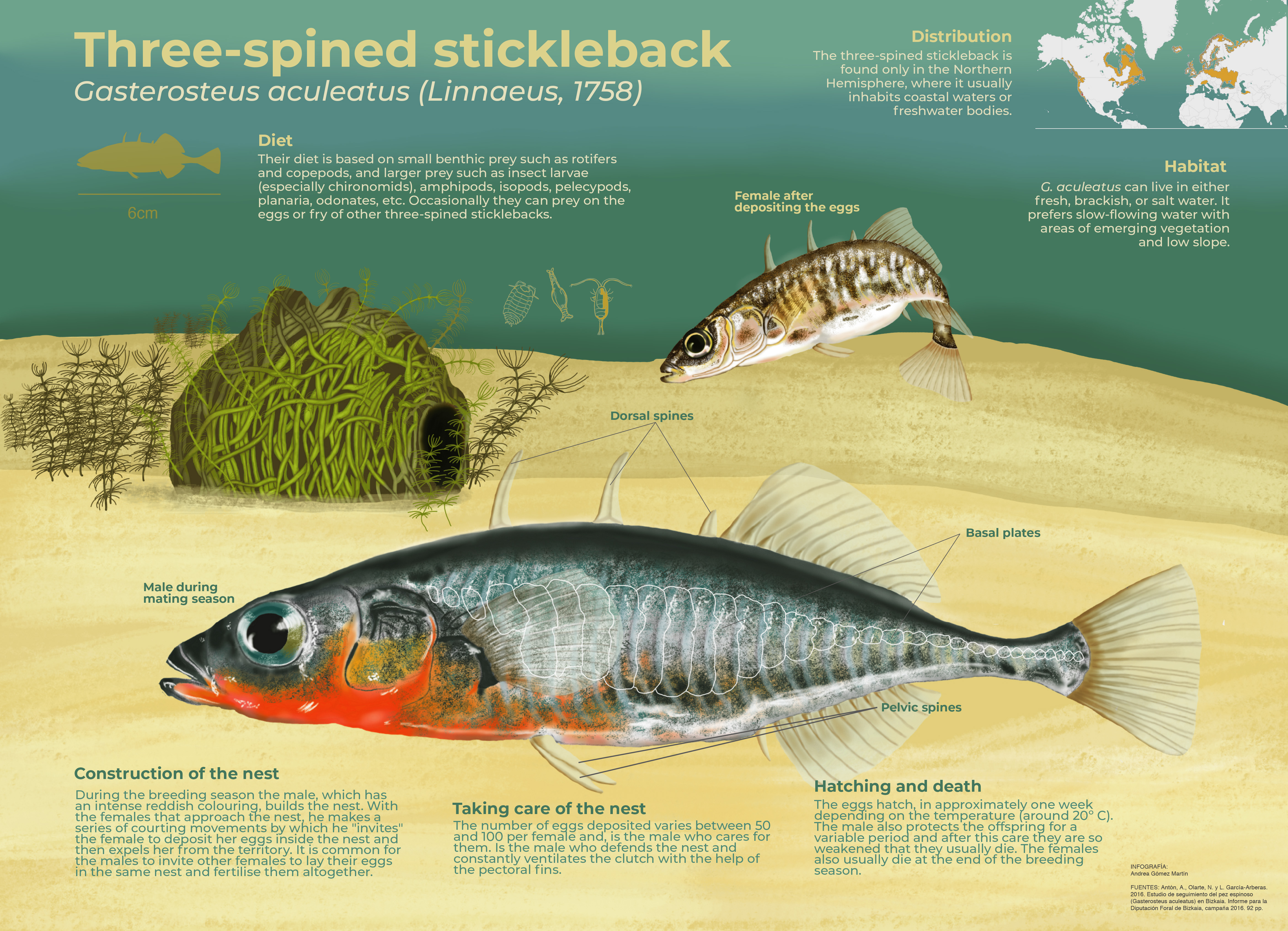
Reproduction of the three-spined stickleback

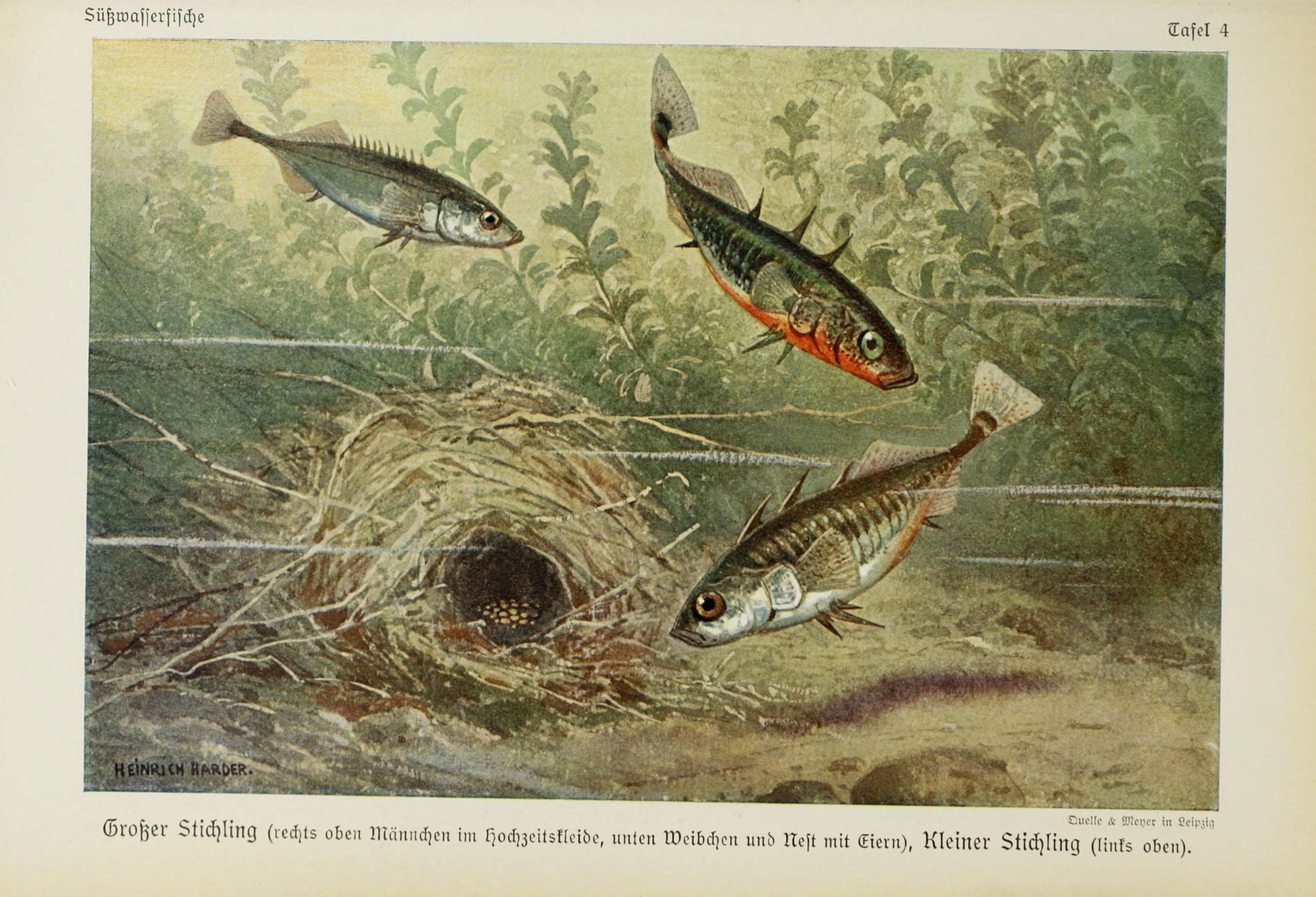
Illustration of nesting three-spined sticklebacks

Sexual maturation depends on environmental temperature and photo-period. Longer days and warmer days stimulate brighter colouration in males and the development of eggs in females.

From late April, males and females move from deeper waters to shallow areas. There, each male defends a territory where he builds a nest on the bottom. He starts by digging a small pit. He then fills it with plant material (often filamentous algae), sand, and various debris which he glues together with spiggin, a proteinaceous substance secreted from the kidneys. The word spiggin is derived from spigg, the Swedish name for the three-spined stickleback. He then creates a tunnel through the more or less spherical nest by swimming vigorously through it. Nest building typically takes 5–6 hours though it may also be spread out over several days. After this, the male courts gravid females that pass by with a zigzag dance. (In some populations, the male leads the female to the nest, rather than doing the zigzag dance.) He approaches a female by swimming very short distances left and right, and then swims back to the nest in the same way. If the female follows, the male often pokes his head inside the nest, and may swim through the tunnel. The female then swims through the tunnel as well, where she deposits 40–300 eggs. The male follows to fertilize the eggs. The female is then chased away by the male. For the duration of the eggs' development, the male will chase away other males and non-gravid females. He may, however, court other gravid females (more than one batch of eggs can be deposited in the same nest).

The sequence of territorial courtship and mating behaviours was described in detail by Niko Tinbergen in a landmark early study in ethology. Tinbergen showed that the red colour on the throat of the territorial male acts as a simple sign stimulus, releasing aggression in other males and attracting females. The red colouration may also be used by females as a way to assess male quality. Red colouration is produced from carotenoids found in the diet of the fish. As carotenoids cannot be synthesised de novo, the degree of colouration gives an indication of male quality (ability to find food), with higher-quality males showing more intense colouration. Also, males that bear fewer parasites tend to exhibit brighter red colours. Many studies have shown that females prefer males with brighter red colouration. However, the response to red is not universal across the entire species, with black throated populations often found in peat-stained waters.

The male takes care of the developing eggs by fanning them. He lines himself up with the entrance of the nest tunnel and swims on the spot. The movement of his pectoral fins creates a current of water through the nest, bringing fresh (well-oxygenated) water to the eggs. He does this not only during the day, but throughout the night, as well. Fanning levels tend to increase until the eggs are about to hatch, which takes 7–8 days at 18–20 °C (64–68 °F). Fanning levels also increase when the water is poorly oxygenated. Towards the end of the egg development phase, the male often makes holes in the roof and near the rim of the nest, presumably to improve ventilation of the nest during fanning at a time when the eggs are more metabolically active. Once the young hatch, the male attempts to keep them together for a few days, sucking up any wanderers into his mouth and spitting them back into the nest. Afterwards, the young disperse and the nest is either abandoned by the male, or repaired in preparation for another breeding cycle.

In Nova Scotia, a form of three-spined stickleback departs from the usual pattern of parental care. Unlike other sticklebacks that nest on the substrate, Nova Scotian male sticklebacks build nests in mats of filamentous algae. Surprisingly, almost immediately after fertilization, the males disperse the eggs from the nest and resume soliciting females for eggs. Hence, there appears to have been a loss of parental care in this population. Because these males have reduced dorsal pigmentation, resulting a pearlescent white appearance, they have been dubbed "white sticklebacks". It is unknown whether they are a distinct species, or simply a morph of the common Atlantic stickleback.

As the breeding cycle of the three-spined stickleback is light and temperature dependent, it is also possible to manipulate breeding in the lab. For example, it is possible to stimulate sticklebacks to breed twice in a calendar year, instead of once, under the right conditions. This can be useful for genetic and behavioural multi-generational studies.

Infection with the cestode parasite Schistocephalus solidus can cause a reduction in egg mass or complete absence of eggs in female three-spined sticklebacks.

== Cooperative behavior ==
Some evidence indicates the existence of cooperative behavior among three-spined sticklebacks, mainly cooperative predator inspection. Predator inspection appears to allow acquisition of information about the risk a potential predator presents, and may deter attack, with the cost being an increased chance of being attacked if the predator proves to be hungry.

=== Tit for tat strategy ===
Sticklebacks are known to cooperate in a tit for tat (TFT) strategy when doing predator inspection. The idea behind TFT is that an individual cooperates on the first move and then does whatever its opponent does on the previous move. This allows for a combination of collaborative (it starts by cooperating), retaliatory (punishes defection), and forgiving (respond to cooperation of others, even if they had defected previously) behavioral responses. When three-spined sticklebacks approaching a live predator were provided with either a simulated cooperating companion or a simulated defecting one, the fish behaved according to tit-for-tat strategy, supporting the hypothesis that cooperation can evolve among egoists.

Typically, sticklebacks operate in pairs. Individuals have partners with which they repeatedly perform pairwise predator inspection visits. Two reciprocal pairs per trial occur significantly more often than what was expected due to chance. These results provide further evidence for a tit-for-tat cooperation strategy in sticklebacks.

Stickleback behavior is often cited as an archetypal example of cooperative behavior during predator inspection. Fish from three sites differing in predation risk inspected a model predator in pairs and reciprocated both cooperative moves and defections by the partner, but not on every opportunity. Sticklebacks that originated in the two sites containing piscivorous fish were more likely to reciprocate following a cooperative move than following a defection. Individuals from higher-risk sites were generally more cooperative. Individuals accompanied by a model companion show reciprocal moves of cooperation and defection in response to the model's movements about a third of the time. Both examples of stickleback behavior demonstrate the elements of a strategy of cooperation that may resemble tit-for-tat.

=== Partner-dependence ===
The tit-for-tat cooperation strategy has been shown to be evident in sticklebacks. In addition, the size of a stickleback's partner fish may also be a factor in determining what a stickleback will do when both fish are faced with a predator. Two sticklebacks simultaneously presented to a rainbow trout, a predator much larger in size, will have differing risks of being attacked. Usually, the larger of the two sticklebacks has a higher risk of being attacked. Individual sticklebacks are more likely to move closer to a trout (or some other predator) when a larger potential partner moves close to the trout than when a smaller partner approaches the trout. Although both large and small partners behave similarly, a small partner's behavior affects the strategy of the test fish more than that of the large partner. Regardless of whether it is alone or with a partner that cooperates, a larger fish will approach a predator more closely than does a smaller fish. If a partner defects, then a stickleback's condition-factor (i.e. its ability to flee) determines how closely it approaches the predator rather than the stickleback's size. Both the strategy and reaction to different-sized partners seem to be dependent on whether the partner cooperates or defects.

== Parasites ==
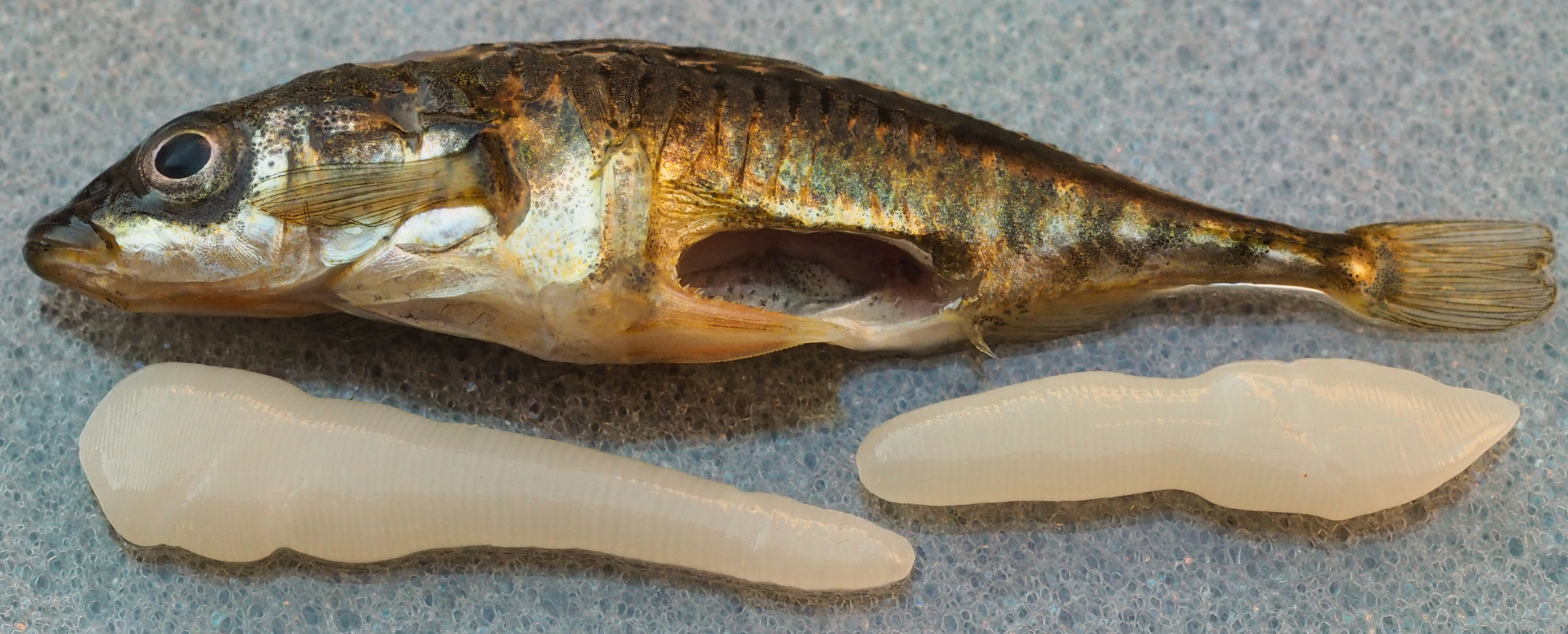
Stickleback next to extracted Schistocephalus solidus plerocercoids

The three-spined stickleback is a secondary intermediate host for the hermaphroditic parasite Schistocephalus solidus, a tapeworm of fish and fish-eating birds. The tapeworm passes into sticklebacks through its first intermediate hosts, cyclopoid copepods, when these are eaten by the fish. The parasite matures into its third larval stage, the plerocercoid, in the abdomen of the stickleback. Infected sticklebacks are afterwards consumed by fish-eating birds, which serve as the tapeworm's definitive host.

Another common parasite of the three-spined stickleback is the microsporidian Glugea anomala. Naturally infections with G. anomala lose weight compared to uninfected individuals, but do not cause size differences between individuals. Glugea anomala also correlates behavioural changes, such as increased shoaling, increased sociability and activity, and reduced boldness. It is unknown whether these differences in behaviour are due to certain personality traits predisposing individuals to infections, or whether infections change behaviour.

== Genetics ==
Three-spined sticklebacks have recently become a major research organism for evolutionary biologists trying to understand the genetic changes involved in adapting to new environments. The entire genome of a female fish from Bear Paw Lake in Alaska was recently sequenced by the Broad Institute and many other genetic resources are available. This population is under risk from the presence of introduced northern pike in a nearby lake. Three-spined sticklebacks are also used for researching sex-specific brain gene expression. Parents exposed to predator models produced offspring with different gene expressions compared to those that were not exposed to predators. Non-overlapping genes appear highly influenced by the sex of the parent, with genes being differentially expressed in offspring based on whether the male or female parent was exposed to predation. Studies concerned with the genetic basis of evolutionary change in the three-spined sticklebacks, involve a regulation of the Pitx1 gene (tissue-specific regulation). This regulation is largely related to pelvic development, showing that a reduction in Pitx1 gene expression contributes to an evolutionary reduction of pelvic structures in specific freshwater populations.

== Eco-evolutionary dynamics ==
Three-spined stickleback research has been central to the field of eco-evolutionary dynamics. Eco-evolutionary dynamics is an area of study investigating how ecological processes (e.g., population dynamics, community interactions, and nutrient cycling) affect how populations evolve, and in turn, how these patterns of evolution feed back to affect ecological processes. Importantly, these dynamics arise when substantial evolutionary change occurs on the same time scale as ecological change (i.e., less than 1,000 generations). Three-spined stickleback are particularly useful for studying eco-evolutionary dynamics because multiple populations have evolved rapidly and in predictable, repeated patterns after colonizing new environments. These repeated patterns of evolution allow scientists to assess whether the impacts of stickleback evolution on ecological processes are reproducible.

An eco-evolutionary framework has been used to explore multiple aspects of stickleback biology. Notably, this research has focused on how populations of three-spined stickleback have diverged to occupy different ecological niches (a process called adaptive radiation) and how sticklebacks have coevolved with their parasites.

=== Eco-evolutionary dynamics of adaptive radiation ===
Most eco-evolutionary dynamics research in sticklebacks has focused on how the adaptive radiation of different ecotypes affects ecological processes. Ecotypes represent genetically and morphologically recognizable populations occupying distinct ecological niches. In three-spined stickleback, divergent ecotypes are often found as sympatric (i.e., co-occurring) or parapatric (i.e., partially overlapping, but mostly isolated) species pairs, including benthic—limnetic pairs, freshwater—anadromous pairs, and lake—stream pairs. Pairs of stickleback ecotypes have diverged at time scales ranging from 10,000 years to only decades ago.

Different combinations of stickleback ecotypes affect ecosystem processes in different ways. For example, the combined presence of specialized benthic and limnetic sticklebacks has a different effect on the diversity and abundance of prey species compared to the presence of only a generalist ancestral stickleback ecotype. Notably, this effect appears to be driven by limnetic sticklebacks specializing on zooplankton prey, rather than by an increase in the number of co-occurring stickleback species alone. The impacts of ecotype specialization on prey communities can even affect the abundance of algae and cyanobacteria that do not directly interact with sticklebacks, along with aspects of the abiotic environment, such as the amount of ambient light available for photosynthesis and levels of dissolved oxygen, carbon, and phosphorus. These diverse changes in ecosystem processes can persist to affect natural selection on subsequent stickleback generations, potentially shaping how stickleback populations will evolve in the future. Because the presence of specialist verses generalist ecotypes can impact ecosystems in a way that, in turn, affects selection on future stickleback generations, the adaptive radiation of specialized ecotypes could drive eco-evolutionary feedback loops in natural populations.

=== Eco-evolutionary dynamics of host-parasite interactions ===
Sticklebacks have also been studied to investigate the eco-evolutionary dynamics of host-parasite coevolution. Three-spined sticklebacks can be hosts to a variety of parasites (e.g., Schistocephalus solidus, a common tapeworm of fish and fish-eating birds). The diversity of parasite species within individual stickleback is influenced by an individual's dietary niche and immune response. This covariation between parasite infection and host traits is likely a consequence of eco-evolutionary feedback, whereby the evolution of dietary and parasite resistance traits in sticklebacks alters parasite reproduction and infection rates, which in turn affects parasite exposure and selection on parasite resistance in sticklebacks. These feedbacks can also extend beyond stickleback-parasite interactions to modify ecosystem processes. Specifically, differences in resistance and infection rates among stickleback ecotypes can alter how sticklebacks affect the abundance of prey species and levels of dissolved nutrients and oxygen. These ecosystem impacts can further affect selection on sticklebacks in subsequent generations, which suggests a complex feedback loop between the evolution of host-parasite interactions, community composition, and abiotic conditions.

=== Common methods ===
Many researchers have used mesocosm experiments to test how the adaptive radiation of stickleback ecotypes and stickleback-parasite interactions can impact ecological processes. In these experiments, researchers simulate the natural environments of sticklebacks in enclosed tanks, including natural plant and invertebrate communities and freshwater ecological zones. They then systematically manipulate an independent variable (e.g., which stickleback ecotypes were present or the presence of parasites), and measured differences in biotic and abiotic aspects of ecosystems among the different stickleback treatments. In some cases, researchers have then tested for potential feedback loops between ecotype evolution and ecological change by removing the adult stickleback from the mesocosms and replacing them with juveniles of different ecotypes. By doing so, the researchers could then measure how the effects of adult sticklebacks on their ecosystems influenced overall juvenile fitness (e.g., survival and growth rates) and differences in fitness between juveniles of different ecotypes.
