= Eco-evolutionary dynamics =

Reciprocal relationship between ecology and evolution

Eco-evolutionary dynamics refers to the reciprocal effects that ecology and evolution have on each other. The effects of ecology on evolutionary processes are commonly observed in studies, but the realization that evolutionary changes can be rapid led to the emergence of eco-evolutionary dynamics. The idea that evolutionary processes can occur quickly and on one timescale with ecological processes led scientists to begin studying the influence evolution has on ecology along with the affects ecology has on evolution. Recent studies have documented eco-evolutionary dynamics and feedback, which is the cyclic interaction between evolution and ecology, in natural and laboratory systems at different levels of biological organization, such as populations, communities, and ecosystems.

== History ==
Since Charles Darwin published On the Origin of Species in 1859, evolution was known to occur across a long, geographical timescale. It was thought evolutionary processes occurred separately from ecological timescales because they were too slow to interact with ecological changes. Once it was recognized that evolutionary processes could happen relatively quickly and on a shorter timescale, which was contrary to the previous idea associated with Darwin's work, the concept of eco-evolutionary dynamics emerged.

While it was recognized by Darwin and R.A. Fisher (1930) that evolutionary and ecological processes were intertwined, it wasn't until the 1950s and 1960s that scientists would begin to hypothesize the influence evolution has on ecology. The possibility of ecological processes being influenced by evolution and not occurring independently from the evolutionary timescale led scientists to explore the reciprocal interactions between ecology and evolution in natural and laboratory systems. Indeed, increasing evidence shows that evolution can also operate on fine time scales simultaneously with ecological processes. While it has been difficult to research eco-evolutionary dynamics in natural systems, it has been successfully documented using models and laboratory studies. Different studies have documented the interplay between evolutionary and ecological processes and their occurrence on one timescale in populations, communities, and ecosystems. Contributions to the research of eco-evolutionary dynamics include empirical studies on rotifers and green algae, Darwin's finches, fruit flies, alewife–zooplankton interactions, and Trinidadian guppies.

== Eco-evolutionary interactions and feedback ==
In eco-evolutionary dynamics, there is a cyclic interaction between evolution and ecology referred to as eco-evolutionary feedback. An organism's ecological interactions can lead to evolutionary changes of its traits. In response, the evolutionary changes alter the ecological interactions of the organism, and the cycle repeats. The feedback loop occurs because of the interactions between rapid evolution and ecological changes. The change in the distribution of heritable traits or genotype frequency within a population over a few generations is considered rapid evolution or microevolution. Eco-evolutionary feedback is present at different biological levels of organization, such as populations, communities, and ecosystems.

=== Populations and communities ===
Rapid evolution plays a significant role in shaping ecological processes within populations and communities, for eco-evolutionary feedback allows for the maintenance and persistence of trait variation in a species because it alters population and community dynamics. When population dynamics are affected by the variation in heritable traits, within a few generations it can change the strength and direction of natural selection acting on the traits. Population dynamics are also affected by the landscape of the environment a species lives in. The landscape can influence the distribution of genetic variation within a population because it alters gene frequencies. The change in gene frequencies results in a change in phenotypic traits, which determine an organism's reproduction and survival, and the evolutionary changes affect population dynamics. Eco-evolutionary dynamics are also evident at the community level. Short-term evolution can affect the speed at which organisms adapt to fluctuating environments, and the rate of evolution can reshape the community structure. An example of eco-evolutionary dynamics in populations and communities is when two species interact. In a predator-prey system, eco-evolutionary feedback results in the oscillation of population densities as the selection of traits fluctuate. The evolutionary change in one species can drive change to heritable traits and demography in the other species, which in turn can affect the first species. Rotifer-algal chemostats has been used to observe rapid evolution altering predator-prey interactions. Yoshida et al. compared rotifer cultures combined with multiple algal clones to rotifer cultures combined with a single clone. Variation in the defenses against consumption in the algal genotypes influence the growth rate and population density of the rotifers, which feedback to alter the gene frequencies in the algae. In the single clone algae, prey evolution was inhibited because of the lack of variation. The lack of adaptive evolution in the single clone prevented eco-evolutionary feedback in the predator-prey system.

=== Ecosystems ===
While eco-evolutionary dynamics have been successfully documented using models and laboratory studies, It has been difficult to research eco-evolutionary dynamics in natural systems. It is especially more challenging to study evolutionary and ecological dynamics in an ecosystem because of the large number of species and complex interactions that comprise an ecosystem. The realization that rapid evolution can alter ecological processes has led researchers to take an eco-evolutionary approach while observing the consequences of rapid evolutionary change in ecosystems in contemporary time. The idea of evolution being studied on entire ecosystems dates back to the 1920s. It was hypothesized that evolution through natural selection would operate to achieve maximum energy flux through an ecosystem. Since then, progression toward merging ecosystem ecology and evolution continued, and studies have revealed the impact evolution has on ecosystem ecology and vice versa. In an ecosystem, the interactions between individuals and their environment can drive changes in evolution. Due to the complexity of ecosystems, organisms experience multiple interactions in their environment, and these interactions can indirectly change the selective pressures placed on them. The selective pressures lead to genetic and phenotypic variation, which influence ecosystem variables such as decomposition, nutrient cycling, and primary productivity. An example of ecosystem variables being influenced by evolution is a mesocosm experiment using Trinidadian guppies. Predation pressure in an environment caused evolutionary changes in the life-history traits of the guppies, which affected ecosystem processes. Guppies' living in an environment with high predation lead to the fish giving birth more frequently and to smaller offspring. These offspring also matured at an earlier age and at a smaller size than guppies living in a low predation environment. Populations with more and smaller guppies increased the amount of nitrogen and phosphorus in the nutrient pool of an ecosystem, which increased algal biomass. The increase in algal biomass feedback to influence the evolution of other guppy traits. So evolutionary changes in the life-history traits of Trinidadian guppies caused by predation resulted in ecological effects at the community and ecosystem level, which feedback to influence the evolution of other traits in the guppies. Another hypothesis of eco-evolutionary dynamics in ecosystems involves the evolution of food webs. Scientists began to study the evolution of food webs in ecosystems through the use of evolutionary simulation models to get an understanding of the structure and function of current ecosystems. The results of their models lead to the generation of food webs that are similar to our existing food webs.
