= List of fishes of Ukraine =

This list of fishes of Ukraine consists of indigenous and introduced species.

These tags are used to evaluate the conservation status of species by criteria of IUCN:

EX	Extinct
CR	Critically endangered
EN	Endangered
VU	Vulnerable
NT	Near threatened
LC	Least concern
DD	Data deficient
NE	Not evaluated

All the listed species are classified by their origin as freshwater, brackishwater, marine, anadromous, catadromous, and euryhaline; also classified as native, introduced, invasive, and species with accidental finding (difficult to characterize it as native or invasive).

Scientific name	Taxa authority	English name	Ukrainian name	Origin	IUCN status	Image
Order: Petromyzontiformes
Family: Petromyzontidae
Eudontomyzon danfordi	Regan, 1911	Carpathian brook lamprey	Мінога угорська	Freshwater, native	Least concern	
Eudontomyzon mariae	(Berg, 1931)	Ukrainian brook lamprey	Мінога українська	Freshwater, native	Least concern	
Order: Rajiformes
Family: Rajidae
Raja clavata	Linnaeus, 1758	Thornback ray	Морська лисиця	Marine, native	Near threatened	
Order: Myliobatiformes
Family: Dasyatidae
Dasyatis pastinaca	Linnaeus, 1758	Common stingray	Морський кіт	Marine, native	Data deficient	
Family: Gymnuridae
Order: Squaliformes
Family: Squalidae
Squalus acanthias	Linnaeus, 1758	Spiny dogfish	Катран звичайний	Marine, native	Vulnerable	
Order: Acipenseriformes
Family: Acipenseridae
Acipenser gueldenstaedtii	(Brandt & Ratzeburg, 1833)	Russian sturgeon	Осетер російський	Anadromous, native	Critically endangered	
Acipenser nudiventris	Lovetsky, 1828	Bastard sturgeon	Шип	Anadromous, native	Critically endangered	
Acipenser ruthenus	Linnaeus, 1758	Sterlet	Стерлядь	Freshwater, native	Vulnerable	
Acipenser stellatus	Pallas, 1771	Starry sturgeon	Севрюга	Anadromous, native	Critically endangered	
Acipenser sturio	Linnaeus, 1758	European sea sturgeon	Осетер європейський	Anadromous, native	Critically endangered	
Huso huso	Linnaeus, 1758	Beluga; European sturgeon	Білуга	Anadromous, native	Critically endangered	
Family: Polyodontidae
Polyodon spathula	Walbaum, 1792	American paddlefish	Веслоніс північноамериканський	Freshwater, introduced	Vulnerable	
Order: Anguilliformes
Family: Anguillidae
Anguilla anguilla	Linnaeus, 1758	European eel	Вугор європейський	Catadromous, native	Critically endangered	
Family: Congridae
Conger conger	Linnaeus, 1758	European conger	Морський вугор звичайний	Marine, accidental	Not evaluated	
Order: Clupeiformes
Family: Engraulidae
Engraulis encrasicolus	Linnaeus, 1758	European anchovy	Хамса	Marine, native	Not evaluated	
Family: Clupeidae
Alosa caspia	(Eichwald, 1838)	Caspian shad	Пузанок каспійський	Anadromous, native	Least concern	
Alosa fallax	Lacépède, 1800	Twait shad	Фінта	Anadromous, accidental	Least concern	
Alosa immaculata	Bennett, 1835	Pontic shad	Пузанок чорноморський	Anadromous, native	Vulnerable	
Alosa maeotica	Grimm, 1901	Black Sea shad	Оселедець керченський	Anadromous, native	Least concern	
Alosa tanaica	(Grimm, 1901)	Azov shad	Пузанок азовський	Anadromous, native	Least concern	
Clupeonella cultriventris	(Nordmann, 1840)	Black and Caspian Sea sprat	Тюлька звичайна	Brackishwater, native	Least concern	
Sardina pilchardus	Walbaum, 1792	European pilchard	Сардина європейська	Marine, native	Not evaluated	
Sardinella aurita	Valenciennes, 1847	Round sardinella	Сардинка кругла	Marine, accidental	Not evaluated	
Sprattus sprattus	(Linnaeus, 1758)	European sprat	Кілька	Marine, native	Not evaluated	
Order: Cypriniformes
Family: Cyprinidae
Abramis brama	Linnaeus, 1758	Common bream	Лящ	Freshwater, native	Least concern	
Alburnoides bipunctatus	(Bloch, 1782)	Spirlin	Бистрянка звичайна	Freshwater, native	Least concern	
Alburnus alburnus	Linnaeus, 1758	Common bleak	Верховодка звичайна	Freshwater, native	Least concern	
Alburnus leobergi	Freyhof & Kottelat, 2007	Azov shemaya	Селява азовська	Breckishwater, native	Least concern	
Alburnus mentoides	Kessler, 1859	Crimea shemaya	Селява кримська	Freshwater, native	Endangered	
Alburnus sarmaticus	Freyhof & Kottelat, 2007	Pontian shemaya	Селява чорноморська	Freshwater, native	Endangered	
Aspius aspius	(Linnaeus, 1758)	Asp	Білизна звичайна	Freshwater, native	Least concern	
Ballerus ballerus	(Linnaeus, 1758)	Blue bream	Синець	Freshwater, native	Least concern	
Ballerus sapa	Pallas, 1814	White-eye bream	Білоочка	Freshwater, native	Least concern	
Barbus barbus	Linnaeus, 1758	Common barbel	Марена звичайна	Freshwater, native	Least concern	
Barbus borysthenicus	(Dybowski, 1862)	Dnieper barbel	Марена дніпровська	Freshwater, native	Not evaluated	
Barbus carpathicus	Kotlík, Tsigenopoulos, Ráb & Berrebi, 2002	Carpathian barbel	Марена карпатська	Freshwater, native	Least concern	
Barbus petenyi	Heckel, 1852	Romanian barbel	Марена румунська	Freshwater, native	Least concern	
Barbus tauricus	Kessler, 1877	Crimean barbel	Марена кримська	Freshwater, native	Vulnerable	
Barbus waleckii	Rolik, 1970	Vistula barbel	Марена Валецького	Freshwater, native	Least concern	
Blicca bjoerkna	(Linnaeus, 1758)	Silver bream	Плоскирка	Freshwater, native	Least concern	
Carassius auratus	(Linnaeus, 1758)	Goldfish	Карась китайський	Freshwater, introduced	Not evaluated	
Carassius carassius	(Linnaeus, 1758)	Crucian carp	Карась звичайний	Freshwater, native	Least concern	
Carassius gibelio	(Bloch, 1782)	Prussian carp	Карась сріблястий	Freshwater, introduced	Least concern	
Chondrostoma nasus	Linnaeus, 1758	Common nase	Підуст звичайний	Freshwater, native	Least concern	
Chondrostoma variabile	Yakovlev, 1870	Volga undermouth	Підуст волзький	Freshwater, native	Least concern	
Ctenopharyngodon idella	(Valenciennes, 1844)	Grass carp	Амур білий	Freshwater, introduced	Not evaluated	
Cyprinus carpio	Linnaeus, 1758	Common carp	Короп звичайний	Freshwater, introduced?	Least concern	
Gobio brevicirris	Fowler, 1976	Don gudgeon	Пічкур коротковусий	Freshwater, native	Least concern	
Gobio carpathicus	Vladykov, 1925	Carpathian gudgeon	Пічкур карпатський	Freshwater, native	Least concern	
Gobio delyamurei	Freyhof & Naseka, 2005	Chornaya gudgeon	Пічкур чорноріченський	Freshwater, native	Critically endangered	
Gobio gobio	(Linnaeus, 1758)	Gudgeon	Пічкур звичайний	Freshwater, native	Least concern	
Gobio krymensis	Banarescu & Nalbant, 1973	Salgir gudgeon	Пічкур кримський	Freshwater, native	Vulnerable	
Gobio sarmaticus	Berg, 1949	Ukrainian gudgeon	Пічкур дністровський	Freshwater, native	Least concern	
Hypophthalmichthys molitrix	(Valenciennes, 1844)	Silver carp	Товстолоб білий	Freshwater, introduced	Near threatened	
Hypophthalmichthys nobilis	(Richandson, 1845)	Bighead carp	Товстолоб строкатий	Freshwater, introduced	Data deficient	
Leucaspius delineatus	Heckel, 1843	Belica	Вівсянка	Freshwater, native	Least concern	
Leuciscus danilewskii	Kessler, 1877	Don dace	Ялець Данилевського	Freshwater, native	Least concern	
Leuciscus idus	Linnaeus, 1758	Ide	В'язь	Freshwater, native	Least concern	
Leuciscus leuciscus	(Linnaeus, 1758)	Common dace	Ялець звичайний	Freshwater, native	Least concern	
Mylopharyngodon piceus	(Richardson, 1846)	Black carp	Амур чорний	Freshwater, introduced	Not evaluated	
Pelecus cultratus	(Linnaeus, 1758)	Ziege	Чехоня	Freshwater, native	Least concern	
Petroleuciscus borysthenicus	(Kessler, 1859)	Dnieper chub	Бобирець звичайний	Freshwater, native	Least concern	
Phoxinus phoxinus	(Linnaeus, 1758)	Common minnow	Мересниця річкова	Freshwater, native	Not evaluated	
Pseudorasbora parva	Temminck & Schlegel, 1846	Stone moroko	Чебачок амурський	Freshwater, invasive	Not evaluated	
Rhodeus amarus	Bloch, 1782	European bitterling	Гірчак європейський	Freshwater, native	Least concern	
Rhynchocypris percnurus	(Pallas, 1814)	Swamp minnow	Мересниця озерна	Freshwater, native	Least concern	
Romanogobio antipai	Bănărescu, 1953	Danube delta gudgeon	Пічкур-білопер антипи	Freshwater, native	Extinct	
Romanogobio belingi	(Slastenenko, 1934)	Northern whitefin gudgeon	Пічкур-білопер дніпровський	Freshwater, native	Least concern	
Romanogobio kesslerii	(Dybowski, 1862)	Kessler's gudgeon	Пічкур-білопер дністровський	Freshwater, native	Least concern	
Romanogobio tanaiticus	(Naseka, 2001)	Don whitefin gudgeon	Пічкур-білопер донський	Freshwater, native	Least concern	
Romanogobio uranoscopus	(Agassiz, 1828)	Danube gudgeon	Пічкур дунайський	Freshwater, native	Least concern	
Romanogobio vladykovi	(Fang, 1943)	Danube whitefin gudgeon	Пічкур-білопер Владикова	Freshwater, native	Least concern	
Rutilus frisii	(Nordmann, 1840)	Black Sea roach	Вирозуб	Freshwater, native	Least concern	
Rutilus heckelii	Nordmann, 1840	Taran	Тараня	Freshwater, native	Least concern	
Rutilus kutum	Kamensky, 1901	Kutum	Кутум	Freshwater, introduced	Not evaluated	
Rutilus rutilus	Linnaeus, 1758	Common roach	Плітка звичайна	Freshwater, native	Least concern	
Rutilus virgo	(Heckel, 1852)	Cactus roach	Плітка панонська	Freshwater, native	Least concern	
Scardinius erythrophthalmus	(Linnaeus, 1758)	Common rudd	Краснопірка звичайна	Freshwater, native	Least concern	
Squalius cephalus	Linnaeus, 1758	European chub	Головень європейський	Freshwater, native	Least concern	
Telestes souffia	(Risso, 1827)	Western vairone	Ялець-андруга звичайний	Freshwater, native	Least concern	
Tinca tinca	(Linnaeus, 1758)	Tench	Лин	Freshwater, native	Least concern	
Tribolodon brandtii	(Dybowski, 1872)	Pacific redfin	Угай тихоокеанський	Anadromous, introduced	Not evaluated	
Vimba vimba	Linnaeus, 1758	Vimba bream	Рибець звичайний	Freshwater, native	Least concern	
Family: Catostomidae
Ictiobus bubalus	(Rafinesque, 1818)	Smallmouth buffalo	Буфало малоротий	Freshwater, introduced	Not evaluated	
Ictiobus cyprinellus	(Valenciennes, 1844)	Bigmouth buffalo	Буфало великоротий	Freshwater, introduced	Not evaluated	
Ictiobus niger	(Rafinesque, 1819)	Black buffalo	Буфало чорний	Freshwater, introduced	Not evaluated	
Family: Cobitidae
Cobitis elongatoides	(Bacescu & Maier, 1969)	Danube spined loach	Щипавка дунайська	Freshwater, native	Not evaluated	
Cobitis melanoleuca	Nichols, 1925	Siberian spined loach	Щипавка сибірська	Freshwater, native	Least concern	
Cobitis taenia	Linnaeus, 1758	Northern spined loach	Щипавка звичайна loach	Freshwater, native	Least concern	
Cobitis tanaitica	(Bacescu & Maier, 1969)	Don spined loach	Щипавка танайська	Freshwater, native	Not evaluated	
Cobitis taurica	(Vasil'eva, Vasil'ev, Janko, Ráb & Rábová, 2005)	Crimean spined loach	Щипавка кримська	Freshwater, native	Not evaluated	
Misgurnus fossilis	(Linnaeus, 1758)	European weatherfish	В'юн звичайний	Freshwater, native	Least concern	
Sabanejewia balcanica	(Karaman, 1922)	Balcan golden loach	Щипавка балканська	Freshwater, native	Not evaluated	
Sabanejewia baltica	(Witkowski, 1994)	Northern golden loach	Щипавка північна	Freshwater, native	Not evaluated	
Sabanejewia bulgarica	(Drensky, 1928)	Bulgarien golden loach	Щипавка болгарська	Freshwater, native	Not evaluated	
Family: Balitoridae
Barbatula barbatula	(Linnaeus, 1758)	Stone loach	Слиж звичайний	Freshwater, native	Least concern	
Order: Siluriformes
Family: Ictaluridae
Ameiurus melas	Rafinesque, 1820	Black bullhead	Сомик чорний	Freshwater, introduced	Not evaluated	
Ameiurus nebulosus	Lesueur, 1819	Brown bullhead	Сомик коричневий	Freshwater, introduced	Not evaluated	
Ictalurus punctatus	Rafinesque, 1818	Channel catfish	Сом канальний	Freshwater, introduced	Not evaluated	
Family: Siluridae
Silurus glanis	Linnaeus, 1758	Wels catfish	Сом європейський	Freshwater, native	Least concern	
Order: Salmoniformes
Family: Salmonidae
Coregonus autumnalis	Pallas, 1776	Arctic cisco	Омуль	Freshwater, introduced	Least concern	
Coregonus lavaretus	(Linnaeus, 1758)	European whitefish	Сиг європейський	Freshwater, native	Vulnerable	
Coregonus maraena	(Bloch, 1779)	Maraena whitefish	Сиг-марена	Freshwater, native	Vulnerable	
Coregonus maraenoides	(Berg, 1916)	Peipsi whitefish	Сиг чудський	Freshwater, introduced	Not evaluated	
Coregonus peled	(Gmelin, 1788)	Peled	Пелядь	Freshwater, introduced	Least concern	
Hucho hucho	(Linnaeus, 1758)	Danube salmon	Головатиця	Freshwater, native	Endangered	
Oncorhynchus mykiss	(Walbaum, 1792)	Rainbow trout	Пструг райдужний	Anadromous, introduced	Not evaluated	
Salmo labrax	Pallas, 1814	Black Sea salmon	Лосось чорноморський	Anadromous, native	Least concern	
Salmo trutta	Linnaeus, 1758	Brown trout	Пструг струмковий	Freshwater, native	Least concern	
Salvelinus fontinalis	(Mitchill, 1814)	Brook trout	Палія американська	Freshwater, introduced	Not evaluated	
Thymallus thymallus	Linnaeus, 1758	Grayling	Харіус європейський	Freshwater, native	Least concern	
Order: Esociformes
Family: Esocidae
Esox lucius	Linnaeus, 1758	Northern pike	Щука звичайна	Freshwater, native	Least concern	
Family: Umbridae
Umbra krameri	Walbaum, 1792	European mudminnow	Умбра європейська	Freshwater, native	Vulnerable	
Order: Gadiformes
Family: Lotidae
Lota lota	Oken, 1817	Burbot	Минь річковий	Freshwater, native	Least concern	
Gaidropsarus mediterraneus	(Linnaeus, 1758)	Shore rockling	Минь середземноморський	Marine, native	Not evaluated	
Family: Gadidae
Merlangius merlangus	Linnaeus, 1758	Whiting	Мерланг	Marine, native	Not evaluated	
Micromesistius poutassou	(Risso, 1827)	Blue whiting	Путасу північна	Marine, accidental	Not evaluated	
Order: Ophidiiformes
Family: Ophidiidae
Ophidion rochei	Müller, 1845	Roche's snake blenny	Ошибень звичайний	Marine, native	Data deficient	
Order: Lophiiformes
Family: Lophiidae
Lophius piscatorius	Linnaeus, 1758	Sea devil	Морський чорт	Marine, native	Not evaluated	
Order: Atheriniformes
Family: Atherinidae
Atherina boyeri	Risso, 1810	Big-scale sand smelt	Атерина піщана	Brackishwater, native	Least concern	
Atherina hepsetus	Linnaeus, 1758	Mediterranean sand smelt	Атерина середземноморська	Marine, native	Not evaluated	
Order: Beloniformes
Family: Belonidae
Belone belone	(Linnaeus, 1761)	Garfish	Сарган звичайний	Marine, native	Not evaluated	
Family: Adrianichthyidae
Oryzias sinensis	Chen, Uwa & Chu, 1989	Chinese rice fish	Медака китайська	Freshwater, invasive	Least concern	
Order: Cyprinodontiformes
Family: Poeciliidae
Gambusia holbrooki	Girard, 1859	Eastern mosquitofish	Гамбузія східна	Freshwater, introduced	Not evaluated	
Poecilia reticulata	Peters, 1859	Guppy	Гупі	Freshwater, introduced	Not evaluated	
Order: Zeiformes
Family: Zeidae
Zeus faber	Linnaeus, 1758	John Dory	Сонцевик звичайний	Marine, native	Not evaluated	
Order: Gasterosteiformes
Family: Gasterosteidae
Gasterosteus aculeatus	Linnaeus, 1758	Three-spined stickleback	Колючка триголкова	Euryhaline, native	Least concern	
Pungitius platygaster	(Kessler, 1859)	Ukrainian stickleback	Колючка південна	Euryhaline, native	Least concern	
Order: Syngnathiformes
Family: Syngnathidae
Hippocampus guttulatus	(Cuvier, 1829)	Long-snouted seahorse	Морський коник довгорилий	Marine, native	Data deficient	
Nerophis ophidion	(Linnaeus, 1758)	Straightnose pipefish	Морське шило	Marine, native	Not evaluated	
Syngnathus abaster	Risso, 1826	Black-striped pipefish	Іглиця пухлощока	Brackishwater, native	Least concern	
Syngnathus acus	Linnaeus, 1758	Greater pipefish	Іглиця звичайна	Marine, native	Not evaluated	
Syngnathus schmidti	Popov, 1927	Black Sea pelagic pipefish	Іглиця шипувата	Brackishwater, native	Not evaluated	
Syngnathus tenuirostris	Rathke, 1837	Narrow-snouted pipefish	Іглиця тонкорила	Brackishwater, native	Data deficient	
Syngnathus typhle	Linnaeus, 1758	Broadnosed pipefish	Іглиця довгорила	Marine, native	Not evaluated	
Syngnathus variegatus	Pallas, 1814	Thickly snouted pipefish	Іглиця товсторила	Brackishwater, native	Not evaluated	
Order: Scorpaeniformes
Family: Dactylopteridae
Dactylopterus volitans	Linnaeus, 1758	Flying gurnard	Довгопер	Marine, accidental	Not evaluated	
Family: Scorpaenidae
Scorpaena porcus	Linnaeus, 1758	Black scorpionfish	Скорпена звичайна	Marine, native	Not evaluated	
Family: Triglidae
Chelidonichthys cuculus	(Linnaeus, 1758)	Red gurnard	Морський півень червоний	Marine, accidental	Not evaluated	
Chelidonichthys lucerna	(Linnaeus, 1758)	Tub gurnard	Морський півень жовтий	Marine, native	Not evaluated	
Family: Cottidae
Cottus gobio	Linnaeus, 1758	European bullhead	Бабець звичайний	Freshwater, native	Least concern	
Cottus microstomus	(Heckel, 1837)	Baltic sculpin	Бабець малоротий	Freshwater, native	Least concern	
Cottus poecilopus	Heckel, 1837	Alpine bullhead	Бабець строкатоплавцевий	Freshwater, native	Least concern	
Order: Gobiesociformes
Family: Gobiesocidae
Diplecogaster bimaculata	(Bonnaterre, 1788)	Two-spotted clingfish	Риба-качечка двоплямиста	Marine, native	Not evaluated	
Lepadogaster candolii	Risso, 1810	Connemarra clingfish	Риба-качечка товсторила	Marine, native	Not evaluated	
Lepadogaster lepadogaster	(Bonnaterre, 1788)	Shore clingfish	Риба-качечка європейська	Marine, native	Not evaluated	
Order: Perciformes
Family: Blenniidae
Aidablennius sphynx	(Valenciennes, 1836)	Sphinx blenny	Собачка-сфінкс	Marine, native	Not evaluated	
Blennius ocellaris	Linnaeus, 1758	Butterfly blenny	Собачка-метелик	Marine, accidental	Not evaluated	
Coryphoblennius galerita	(Linnaeus, 1758)	Montagu's blenny	Собачка чубатий	Marine, native	Not evaluated	
Microlipophrys adriaticus	(Steindachner & Kolombatovic, 1883)	Adriatic blenny	Собачка адріатичний	Marine, accidental	Data deficient	
Parablennius gattorugine	(Linnaeus, 1758)	Tompot blenny	Собачка тупорилий	Marine, accidental	Not evaluated	
Parablennius incognitus	Bath, 1968	Mystery blenny	Собачка таємничий	Marine, invasive	Not evaluated	
Parablennius sanguinolentus	(Pallas, 1814)	Rusty blenny	Собачка червоно-жовтий	Marine, native	Not evaluated	
Parablennius tentacularis	(Brünnich, 1768)	Tentacled blenny	Собачка щупальцевий	Marine, native	Not evaluated	
Parablennius zvonimiri	Kolombatovic, 1892	Zvonimir's blenny	Собачка Звонимира	Marine, native	Data deficient	
Salaria pavo	(Risso, 1810)	Peacock blenny	Собачка-павич	Marine, native	Not evaluated	
Family: Tripterygiidae
Tripterygion tripteronotus	(Risso, 1810)	Red-black triplefin	Трьохперка чорноголова	Marine, native	Least concern	
Family: Callionymidae
Callionymus fasciatus	Valenciennes, 1837	Banded dragonet	Піскарка смугаста	Marine, native	Least concern	
Callionymus pusillus	Delaroche, 1809	Sailfin dragonet	Піскарка бура	Marine, native	Not evaluated	
Callionymus risso	Le Sueur, 1814	Risso's dragonet	Піскарка сіра	Marine, native	Not evaluated	
Family: Odontobutidae
Perccottus glenii	Dybowski, 1877	Chinese sleeper	Ротань-головешка	Freshwater, introduced	Not evaluated	
Family: Gobiidae
Aphia minuta	(Risso, 1810)	Transparent goby	Бичок прозорий	Marine, native	Not evaluated	
Babka gymnotrachelus	(Kessler, 1857)	Racer goby	Бичок-гонець	Brackishwater, native	Least concern	
Benthophiloides brauneri	Beling & Iljin, 1927	Beardless tadpole goby	Пуголовочка Браунера	Brackishwater, native	Data deficient	
Benthophilus durrelli	Boldyrev & Bogutskaya, 2004	Don tadpole-goby	Пуголовка донська	Freshwater, native	Least concern	
Benthophilus magistri	Iljin, 1927	Azov tadpole goby	Пуголовка азовська	Brackishwater, native	Least concern	
Benthophilus nudus	Berg, 1898	Black Sea tadpole-goby	Пуголовка гола	Brackishwater, native	Least concern	
Benthophilus stellatus	(Sauvage, 1874)	Stellate tadpole-goby	Пуголовка зірчаста	Brackishwater, native	Least concern	
Caspiosoma caspium	(Kessler, 1877)	Caspiosoma	Бичок-голяк	Brackishwater, native	Least concern	
Gammogobius steinitzi	(Bath, 1971)	Steinitz's goby	Бичок Штайниця	Marine, invasive	Data deficient	
Gobius bucchichi	Steindachner, 1870	Bucchich's goby	Бичок-рись	Marine, native	Least concern	
Gobius cobitis	Pallas, 1814	Giant goby	Бичок-кругляш	Marine, native	Least concern	
Gobius cruentatus	Gmelin, 1789	Red-mouthed goby	Бичок червоноротий	Marine, invasive	Not evaluated	
Gobius niger	Linnaeus, 1758	Black goby	Бичок чорний	Brackishwater, native	Not evaluated	
Gobius paganellus	Linnaeus, 1758	Rock goby	Бичок скельний	Marine, native	Not evaluated	
Gobius xanthocephalus	Heymer & Zander, 1992	Yellow-headed goby	Бичок жовтоголовий	Marine, native	Least concern	
Knipowitschia caucasica	(Berg, 1916)	Caucasian dwarf goby	Кніповичія кавказька	Brackishwater, native	Least concern	
Knipowitschia longecaudata	(Berg, 1916)	Longtail dwarf goby	Бичок-хвостач	Brackishwater, native	Least concern	
Mesogobius batrachocephalus	(Pallas, 1814)	Toad goby	Бичок жабоголовий	Brackishwater, native	Least concern	
Millerigobius macrocephalus	(Kolombatovic, 1891)	Large-headed goby	Бичок великоголовий	Brackishwater, invasive	Not evaluated	
Neogobius fluviatilis	(Pallas, 1814)	Monkey goby	Бичок-бабка	Brackishwater, native	Least concern	
Neogobius melanostomus	(Pallas, 1814)	Round goby	Бичок-кругляк	Brackishwater, native	Least concern	
Pomatoschistus bathi	(Miller, 1982)	Bath's goby	Лисун Бата	Brackishwater, invasive	Not evaluated	
Pomatoschistus marmoratus	(Risso, 1810)	Marbled goby	Лисун мармуровий	Brackishwater, native	Not evaluated	
Pomatoschistus minutus	(Pallas, 1770)	Sand goby	Лисун малий	Brackishwater, native	Not evaluated	
Pomatoschistus pictus	Malm, 1865	Painted goby	Лисун мальований	Brackishwater, accidental	Not evaluated	
Ponticola cephalargoides	(Pinchuk, 1976)	Pinchuk's goby	Бичок Пінчука	Brackishwater, native	Not evaluated	
Ponticola eurycephalus	(Kessler, 1874)	Mushroom goby	Бичок рудий	Brackishwater, native	Least concern	
Ponticola kessleri	(Günther, 1861)	Bighead goby	Бичок-головань	Brackishwater, native	Least concern	
Ponticola platyrostris	(Pallas, 1814)	Flatsnout goby	Бичок-губань	Brackishwater, native	Least concern	
Ponticola ratan	(Nordmann, 1840)	Ratan goby	Бичок кам'яний	Brackishwater, native	Not evaluated	
Ponticola syrman	(Nordmann, 1840)	Syrman goby	Бичок-сурман	Brackishwater, native	Least concern	
Proterorhinus marmoratus	(Pallas, 1814)	Marine tubenose goby	Бичок-цуцик морський	Brackishwater, native	Least concern	
Proterorhinus semilunaris	(Heckel, 1837)	Western tubenose goby	Бичок-цуцик західний	Freshwater, native	Least concern	
Proterorhinus tataricus	Freyhof & Naseka, 2007	Chornaya tubenose goby	Бичок-цуцик чорноріченський	Freshwater, native	Critically endangered	
Tridentiger trigonocephalus	(Gill, 1859)	Chameleon goby	Бичок-хамелеон	Brackishwater, invasive	Not evaluated	
Zosterisessor ophiocephalus	(Pallas, 1814)	Grass goby	Бичок-зеленчак	Marine, native	Data deficient	
Family: Labridae
Ctenolabrus rupestris	(Linnaeus, 1758)	Goldsinny wrasse	Губань-скельник	Marine, native	Not evaluated	
Labrus viridis	Linnaeus, 1758	Green wrasse	Губань зелений	Marine, native	Vulnerable	
Symphodus cinereus	(Bonnaterre, 1788)	Grey wrasse	Зеленушка-орябок	Marine, native	Least concern	
Symphodus ocellatus	Forsskål, 1775	Ocellated wrasse	Зеленушка плямиста	Marine, native	Least concern	
Symphodus roissali	(Risso, 1810)	Five-spotted wrasse	Зеленушка-перепілка	Marine, native	Least concern	
Symphodus rostratus	(Bloch, 1791)	Pointed-snout wrasse	Зеленушка носата	Marine, native	Least concern	
Symphodus tinca	(Linnaeus, 1758)	East Atlantic peacock wrasse	Зеленушка-рулена	Marine, native	Least concern	
Family: Pomacentridae
Chromis chromis	(Linnaeus, 1758)	Damselfish	Морська ластівка	Marine, native	Not evaluated	
Family: Mugilidae
Chelon labrosus	(Risso, 1827)	Thicklip grey mullet	Стрибка	Marine, accidental	Not evaluated	
Liza aurata	(Risso, 1810)	Golden grey mullet	Сингіль	Marine, native	Least concern	
Liza haematocheilus	(Temminck & Schlegel, 1845)	Redlip mullet	Піленгас	Brackishwater, introduced	Not evaluated	
Liza ramada	(Risso, 1810)	Thinlip mullet	Кефаль-головач	Marine, native	Not evaluated	
Liza saliens	(Risso, 1810)	Leaping mullet	Гостроніс	Marine, native	Least concern	
Mugil cephalus	Linnaeus, 1758	Flathead mullet	Лобань	Marine, native	Least concern	
Family: Carangidae
Trachurus mediterraneus	(Steindachner, 1868)	Mediterranean horse mackerel	Ставрида середземноморська	Marine, native	Not evaluated	
Trachurus trachurus	(Linnaeus, 1758)	Atlantic horse mackerel	Ставрида атлантична	Marine, native	Not evaluated	
Naucrates ductor	(Linnaeus, 1758)	Pilot fish	Риба-лоцман	Marine, accidental	Not evaluated	
Family: Centracanthidae
Spicara maena	(Linnaeus, 1758)	Blotched picarel	Смарида смугаста	Marine, native	Not evaluated	
Spicara smaris	(Linnaeus, 1758)	Picarel	Смарида звичайна	Marine, native	Not evaluated	
Family: Centrarchidae
Lepomis gibbosus	(Linnaeus, 1758)	Pumpkinseed	Царьок	Freshwater, invasive	Not evaluated	
Family: Chaetodontidae
Heniochus acuminatus	(Linnaeus, 1758)	Pennant coralfish	Кабуба білопера	Marine, accidental	Least concern	
Family: Moronidae
Dicentrarchus labrax	(Linnaeus, 1758)	European seabass	Лаврак	Marine, native	Least concern	
Morone saxatilis	(Walbaum, 1792)	Striped bass	Окунь смугастий	Euryhaline, introduced	Not evaluated	
Family: Mullidae
Mullus barbatus	Linnaeus, 1758	Red mullet	Барабуля звичайна	Marine, native	Not evaluated	
Family: Percidae
Gymnocephalus acerina	Güldenstädt, 1774	Donets ruffe	Носар	Freshwater, native	Least concern	
Gymnocephalus baloni	Holcík & Hensel, 1974	Balon's ruffe	Йорж дунайський	Freshwater, native	Least concern	
Gymnocephalus cernua	Linnaeus, 1758	Eurasian ruffe	Йорж звичайний	Freshwater, native	Least concern	
Gymnocephalus schraetser	Linnaeus, 1758	Schraetzer	Йорж смугастий	Freshwater, native	Least concern	
Perca fluviatilis	Linnaeus, 1758	European perch	Окунь звичайний	Freshwater, native	Least concern	
Percarina demidoffii	Nordmann, 1840	Common percarina	Сопач чорноморський	Brackishwater, native	Near threatened	
Percarina maeotica	Kuznetsov, 1888	Azov percarina	Сопач азовський	Brackishwater, native	Least concern	
Sander lucioperca	(Linnaeus, 1758)	Zander	Судак звичайний	Freshwater, native	Least concern	
Sander marinus	(Cuvier, 1828)	Estuarine perch	Судак морський	Brackishwater, native	Data deficient	
Sander volgensis	(Gmelin, 1789)	Volga pikeperch	Судак волзький	Freshwater, native	Least concern	
Zingel streber	(Siebold, 1863)	Streber	Чіп малий	Freshwater, native	Least concern	
Zingel zingel	Linnaeus, 1766	Common zingel	Чіп звичайний	Freshwater, native	Least concern	
Family: Pomatomidae
Pomatomus saltatrix	(Linnaeus, 1766)	Bluefish	Луфар	Marine, native	Not evaluated	
Family: Sciaenidae
Argyrosomus regius	Asso, 1801	Meagre	Горбань сріблястий	Marine, native	Not evaluated	
Sciaena umbra	(Linnaeus, 1758)	Brown meagre	Горбань темний	Marine, native	Not evaluated	
Umbrina cirrosa	(Linnaeus, 1758)	Shi drum	Горбань світлий	Marine, native	Not evaluated	
Family: Serranidae
Serranus cabrilla	(Linnaeus, 1758)	Comber	Пильчак-ханос	Marine, native	Not evaluated	
Serranus scriba	(Linnaeus, 1758)	Painted comber	Пильчак кам'яний	Marine, native	Not evaluated	
Family: Sparidae
Boops boops	(Linnaeus, 1758)	Bogue	Бопс великоокий	Marine, native	Not evaluated	
Dentex dentex	(Linnaeus, 1758)	Common dentex	Зубань звичайний	Marine, native	Not evaluated	
Diplodus annularis	(Linnaeus, 1758)	Annular seabream	Ласкир	Marine, native	Not evaluated	
Diplodus puntazzo	Cetti, 1777	Sharpsnout seabream	Зубарик	Marine, native	Not evaluated	
Diplodus sargus	(Linnaeus, 1758)	Sargo	Сарг	Marine, native	Not evaluated	
Pagellus erythrinus	(Linnaeus, 1758)	Common pandora	Пагель червоний	Marine, native	Not evaluated	
Sarpa salpa	(Linnaeus, 1758)	Salema porgy	Сарпа	Marine, invasive?	Not evaluated	
Sparus aurata	Linnaeus, 1758	Gilt-head bream	Спар	Marine, invasive?	Not evaluated	
Family: Sphyraenidae
Sphyraena pinguis	(Günther, 1874)	Red barracuda	Баракуда червона	Marine, accidental	Not evaluated	
Sphyraena sphyraena	(Linnaeus, 1758)	European barracuda	Баракуда європейська	Marine, native	Not evaluated	
Family: Scombridae
Sarda sarda	Bloch, 1793	Atlantic bonito	Пеламіда атлантична	Marine, native	Least concern	
Scomber colias	Gmelin, 1789	Atlantic chub mackerel	Скумбрія середземноморська	Marine, native	Least concern	
Scomber scombrus	Linnaeus, 1758	Atlantic mackerel	Скумбрія атлантична	Marine, native	Least concern	
Thunnus thynnus	(Linnaeus, 1758)	Atlantic bluefin tuna	Тунець блакитний	Marine, native	Endangered	
Family: Xiphiidae
Xiphias gladius	Linnaeus, 1758	Swordfish	Риба-меч	Marine, native	Least concern	
Family: Ammodytidae
Gymnammodytes cicerelus	(Rafinesque, 1810)	Mediterranean sand eel	Піщанка стручкувата	Marine, native	Not evaluated	
Family: Trachinidae
Trachinus draco	Linnaeus, 1758	Greater weever	Дракончик великий	Marine, native	Not evaluated	
Family: Uranoscopidae
Uranoscopus scaber	Linnaeus, 1758	Atlantic stargazer	Зіркогляд звичайний	Marine, native	Not evaluated	
Order: Pleuronectiformes
Family: Scophthalmidae
Scophthalmus maeoticus	(Pallas, 1814)	Black Sea turbot	Калкан чорноморський	Marine, native	Not evaluated	
Scophthalmus rhombus	(Linnaeus, 1758)	Brill	Калкан гладенький	Marine, native	Not evaluated	
Family: Bothidae
Arnoglossus kessleri	(Schmidt, 1915)	Scaldback	Арноглось Кесслера	Marine, native	Data deficient	
Family: Pleuronectidae
Platichthys flesus	Linnaeus, 1758	European flounder	Глось	Brackishwater, native	Least concern	
Family: Soleidae
Pegusa nasuta	(Pallas, 1814)	Blackhand sole	Морський язик носатий	Marine, native	Not evaluated	
Order: Tetraodontiformes
Family: Balistidae
Balistes capriscus	(Gmelin, 1789)	Grey triggerfish	Спиноріг європейський	Marine, native	Not evaluated	

== See also ==
- Fauna of Ukraine
