= List of fishes of the Black Sea =

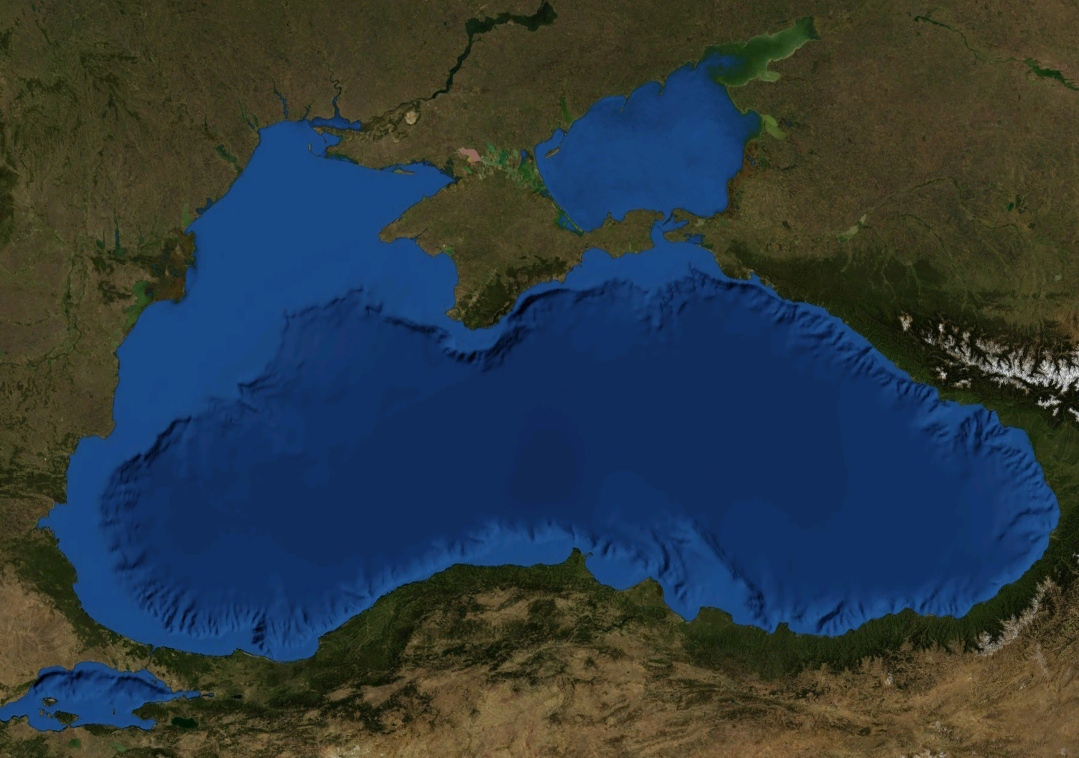

The list of fishes of the Black Sea consists of indigenous, and also introduced species.

== List ==
The following tags are used to indicate the conservation status of species by IUCN's criteria:

EX	Extinct
CR	Critically endangered
EN	Endangered
VU	Vulnerable
NT	Near threatened
LC	Least concern
DD	Data deficient
NE	Not evaluated

All the listed species are classified by their origin as native, introduced, invasive, and species found accidentally (difficult to characterize as native or invasive).

Scientific name	Taxa authority	English name	Origin	Country of occurrence	IUCN status	Image
Ordo: Petromyzontiformes
Family: Petromyzontidae
Eudontomyzon mariae	(Berg, 1931)	Ukrainian brook lamprey	Native	Bulgaria, Romania, Russia, Turkey, Ukraine	Least concern	
Ordo: Rajiformes
Family: Rajidae
Raja clavata	Linnaeus, 1758	Thornback ray	Native	Bulgaria, Georgia, Romania, Russia, Turkey, Ukraine	Near threatened	
Ordo: Myliobatiformes
Family: Dasyatidae
Dasyatis pastinaca	Linnaeus, 1758	Common stingray	Native	Bulgaria, Georgia, Romania, Russia, Turkey, Ukraine	Data deficient	
Family: Gymnuridae
Gymnura altavela	(Linnaeus, 1758)	Spiny butterfly ray	Accidental	Turkey	Vulnerable	
Ordo: Carcharhiniformes
Family: Scyliorhinidae
Scyliorhinus canicula	(Linnaeus, 1758)	Small-spotted catshark	Accidental	Bulgaria, Turkey	Not evaluated	
Family: Sphyrnidae
Sphyrna zygaena	(Linnaeus, 1758)	Smooth hammerhead	Accidental	Bulgaria, Romania	Vulnerable	
Ordo: Lamniformes
Family: Alopiidae
Alopias vulpinus	(Bonnaterre, 1788)	Common thresher	Accidental	Bulgaria, Turkey	Vulnerable	
Ordo: Squaliformes
Family: Squalidae
Squalus acanthias	Linnaeus, 1758	Spiny dogfish	Native	Bulgaria, Georgia, Romania, Russia, Turkey, Ukraine	Vulnerable	
Squalus blainville	(Risso, 1827)	Longnose spurdog	Native	Bulgaria, Georgia, Turkey	Not evaluated	
Ordo: Squatiniformes
Family: Squatinidae
Squatina squatina	Linnaeus, 1758	Angelshark	Accidental	Bulgaria, Turkey	Critically endangered	
Ordo: Acipenseriformes
Family: Acipenseridae
Acipenser gueldenstaedtii	(Brandt & Ratzeburg, 1833)	Russian sturgeon	Native	Bulgaria, Georgia, Romania, Russia, Turkey, Ukraine	Critically endangered	
Acipenser nudiventris	Lovetsky, 1828	Bastard sturgeon	Native	Bulgaria, Georgia, Romania, Russia, Turkey, Ukraine	Critically endangered	
Acipenser persicus	Borodin, 1897	Persian sturgeon	Native	Bulgaria, Georgia	Critically endangered	
Acipenser ruthenus	Linnaeus, 1758	Sterlet	Native	Bulgaria, Georgia, Romania, Russia, Turkey, Ukraine	Vulnerable	
Acipenser stellatus	Pallas, 1771	Starry sturgeon	Native	Bulgaria, Georgia, Romania, Russia, Turkey, Ukraine	Critically endangered	
Acipenser sturio	Linnaeus, 1758	European sea sturgeon	Native	Bulgaria, Georgia, Romania, Russia, Turkey, Ukraine	Critically endangered	
Huso huso	Linnaeus, 1758	Beluga	Native	Bulgaria, Georgia, Romania, Russia, Turkey, Ukraine	Critically endangered	
Ordo: Anguilliformes
Family: Anguillidae
Anguilla anguilla	Linnaeus, 1758	European eel	Native	Bulgaria, Georgia, Romania, Russia, Turkey, Ukraine	Critically endangered	
Family: Congridae
Conger conger	Linnaeus, 1758	European conger	Accidental	Bulgaria, Romania, Turkey, Ukraine	Not evaluated	
Ordo: Clupeiformes
Family: Engraulidae
Engraulis encrasicolus	Linnaeus, 1758	European anchovy	Native	Bulgaria, Georgia, Romania, Russia, Turkey, Ukraine	Not evaluated	
Family: Clupeidae
Alosa caspia	(Eichwald, 1838)	Caspian shad	Native	Bulgaria, Georgia, Romania, Russia, Turkey, Ukraine	Least concern	
Alosa fallax	Lacépède, 1800	Twait shad	Native	Bulgaria, Romania, Russia, Turkey, Ukraine	Least concern	
Alosa immaculata	Bennett, 1835	Pontic shad	Native	Bulgaria, Georgia, Romania, Russia, Turkey, Ukraine	Vulnerable	
Alosa maeotica	Grimm, 1901	Black Sea shad	Native	Bulgaria, Georgia, Romania, Russia, Turkey, Ukraine	Least concern	
Alosa tanaica	(Grimm, 1901)	Azov shad	Native	Bulgaria, Georgia, Romania, Russia, Turkey, Ukraine	Least concern	
Clupeonella cultriventris	(Nordmann, 1840)	Black Sea sprat	Native	Bulgaria, Georgia, Romania, Russia, Turkey, Ukraine	Least concern	
Sardina pilchardus	Walbaum, 1792	European pilchard	Native	Bulgaria, Georgia, Romania, Russia, Turkey, Ukraine	Not evaluated	
Sardinella aurita	Valenciennes, 1847	Round sardinella	Accidental	Bulgaria, Georgia, Romania, Turkey, Ukraine	Not evaluated	
Sprattus sprattus	(Linnaeus, 1758)	European sprat	Native	Bulgaria, Georgia, Romania, Russia, Turkey, Ukraine	Not evaluated	
Ordo: Salmoniformes
Family: Salmonidae
Salmo labrax	Pallas, 1814	Black Sea salmon	Native	Bulgaria, Georgia, Romania, Russia, Turkey, Ukraine	Least concern	
Salmo trutta	Linnaeus, 1758	Brown trout	Introduced species	Bulgaria, Romania, Russia, Turkey, Ukraine	Least concern	
Ordo: Gadiformes
Family: Gadidae
Merlangius merlangus	Linnaeus, 1758	Whiting	Native	Bulgaria, Georgia, Romania, Russia, Turkey, Ukraine	Not evaluated	
Micromesistius poutassou	(Risso, 1827)	Blue whiting	Accidental	Bulgaria, Ukraine	Not evaluated	
Family: Lotidae
Gaidropsarus mediterraneus	(Linnaeus, 1758)	Shore rockling	Native	Bulgaria, Georgia, Romania, Russia, Turkey, Ukraine	Not evaluated	
Family: Merlucciidae
Merluccius merluccius	(Linnaeus, 1758)	European hake	Native	Bulgaria, Georgia, Turkey	Not evaluated	
Ordo: Ophidiiformes
Family: Ophidiidae
Ophidion rochei	Müller, 1845	Roche's snake blenny	Native	Bulgaria, Georgia, Romania, Russia, Turkey, Ukraine	Data deficient	
Ordo: Lophiiformes
Family: Lophiidae
Lophius budegassa	(Spinola, 1807)	Blackbellied angler	Native	Bulgaria, Turkey	Not evaluated	
Lophius piscatorius	Linnaeus, 1758	Sea devil	Native	Bulgaria, Turkey, Ukraine	Not evaluated	
Ordo: Atheriniformes
Family: Atherinidae
Atherina boyeri	Risso, 1810	Big-scale sand smelt	Native	Bulgaria, Georgia, Romania, Russia, Turkey, Ukraine	Least concern	
Atherina hepsetus	Linnaeus, 1758	Mediterranean sand smelt	Native	Bulgaria, Georgia, Romania, Russia, Turkey, Ukraine	Not evaluated	
Ordo: Beloniformes
Family: Belonidae
Belone belone	(Linnaeus, 1761)	Garfish	Native	Bulgaria, Georgia, Romania, Russia, Turkey, Ukraine	Not evaluated	
Ordo: Cyprinodontiformes
Family: Poeciliidae
Gambusia holbrooki	Girard, 1859	Eastern mosquitofish	Introduced species	Bulgaria, Georgia, Turkey	Not evaluated	
Ordo: Zeiformes
Family: Zeidae
Zeus faber	Linnaeus, 1758	John Dory	Native	Bulgaria, Georgia, Romania, Russia, Turkey, Ukraine	Not evaluated	
Ordo: Gasterosteiformes
Family: Gasterosteidae
Gasterosteus aculeatus	Linnaeus, 1758	Three-spined stickleback	Native	Bulgaria, Georgia, Romania, Russia, Turkey, Ukraine	Least concern	
Pungitius platygaster	(Kessler, 1859)	Ukrainian stickleback	Native	Bulgaria, Romania, Russia, Turkey, Ukraine	Least concern	
Ordo: Syngnathiformes
Family: Syngnathidae
Hippocampus guttulatus	(Cuvier, 1829)	Long-snouted seahorse	Native	Bulgaria, Georgia, Romania, Russia, Turkey, Ukraine	Data deficient	
Nerophis ophidion	(Linnaeus, 1758)	Straightnose pipefish	Native	Bulgaria, Georgia, Romania, Russia, Turkey, Ukraine	Not evaluated	
Syngnathus abaster	Risso, 1826	Black-striped pipefish	Native	Bulgaria, Georgia, Romania, Russia, Turkey, Ukraine	Least concern	
Syngnathus acus	Linnaeus, 1758	Greater pipefish	Accidental	Bulgaria,Turkey, Ukraine	Not evaluated	
Syngnathus schmidti	Popov, 1927	Black Sea pelagic pipefish	Native	Bulgaria, Georgia, Romania, Russia, Turkey, Ukraine	Not evaluated	
Syngnathus tenuirostris	Rathke, 1837	Narrow-snouted pipefish	Native	Bulgaria, Georgia, Romania, Russia, Turkey, Ukraine	Data deficient	
Syngnathus typhle	Linnaeus, 1758	Broadnosed pipefish	Native	Bulgaria, Georgia, Romania, Russia, Turkey, Ukraine	Not evaluated	
Syngnathus variegatus	Pallas, 1814	Thickly snouted pipefish	Native	Bulgaria, Georgia, Romania, Russia, Turkey, Ukraine	Not evaluated	
Ordo: Scorpaeniformes
Family: Scorpaenidae
Scorpaena notata	Rafinesque, 1810	Small red scorpionfish	Native	Russia, Turkey	Not evaluated	
Scorpaena porcus	Linnaeus, 1758	Black scorpionfish	Native	Bulgaria, Georgia, Romania, Russia, Turkey, Ukraine	Not evaluated	
Family: Dactylopteridae
Dactylopterus volitans	Linnaeus, 1758	Flying gurnard	Accidental	Bulgaria, Ukraine	Not evaluated	
Family: Triglidae
Chelidonichthys cuculus	(Linnaeus, 1758)	Red gurnard	Accidental	Bulgaria, Turkey, Ukraine	Not evaluated	
Chelidonichthys lucerna	(Linnaeus, 1758)	Tub gurnard	Native	Bulgaria, Georgia, Romania, Russia, Turkey, Ukraine	Not evaluated	
Eutrigla gurnardus	(Linnaeus, 1758)	Grey gurnard	Accidental	Bulgaria, Turkey	Not evaluated	
Ordo: Gobiesociformes
Family: Gobiesocidae
Apletodon dentatus	(Facciolà, 1887)	Small-headed clingfish	Native	Bulgaria, Romania	Not evaluated	
Diplecogaster bimaculata	(Bonnaterre, 1788)	Two-spotted clingfish	Native	Bulgaria, Georgia, Romania, Russia, Turkey, Ukraine	Not evaluated	
Lepadogaster candolii	Risso, 1810	Connemarra clingfish	Native	Bulgaria, Georgia, Russia, Turkey, Ukraine	Not evaluated	
Lepadogaster lepadogaster	(Bonnaterre, 1788)	Shore clingfish	Native	Bulgaria, Georgia, Romania, Russia, Turkey, Ukraine	Not evaluated	
Ordo: Perciformes
Family: Blenniidae
Aidablennius sphynx	(Valenciennes, 1836)	Sphinx blenny	Native	Bulgaria, Georgia, Romania, Russia, Turkey, Ukraine	Not evaluated	
Blennius ocellaris	Linnaeus, 1758	Butterfly blenny	Native	Bulgaria, Turkey, Ukraine	Not evaluated	
Coryphoblennius galerita	(Linnaeus, 1758)	Montagu's blenny	Native	Bulgaria, Georgia, Romania, Russia, Turkey, Ukraine	Not evaluated	
Microlipophrys adriaticus	(Steindachner & Kolombatovic, 1883)	Adriatic blenny	Accidental	Bulgaria, Turkey, Ukraine	Data deficient	
Parablennius gattorugine	(Linnaeus, 1758)	Tompot blenny	Native	Bulgaria, Turkey	Not evaluated	
Parablennius incognitus	Bath, 1968	Mystery blenny	Invasive	Bulgaria, Georgia, Turkey, Ukraine	Not evaluated	
Parablennius sanguinolentus	(Pallas, 1814)	Rusty blenny	Native	Bulgaria, Georgia, Romania, Russia, Turkey, Ukraine	Not evaluated	
Parablennius tentacularis	(Brünnich, 1768)	Tentacled blenny	Native	Bulgaria, Georgia, Romania, Russia, Turkey, Ukraine	Not evaluated	
Parablennius zvonimiri	Kolombatovic, 1892	Zvonimir's blenny	Native	Bulgaria, Georgia, Romania, Russia, Turkey, Ukraine	Data deficient	
Salaria pavo	(Risso, 1810)	Peacock blenny	Native	Bulgaria, Georgia, Romania, Russia, Turkey, Ukraine	Not evaluated	
Family: Tripterygiidae
Tripterygion tripteronotus	(Risso, 1810)	Red-black triplefin	Native	Bulgaria, Romania, Russia, Turkey, Ukraine	Least concern	
Family: Callionymidae
Callionymus fasciatus	Valenciennes, 1837	Banded dragonet	Native	Bulgaria, Russia, Turkey	Least concern	
Callionymus lyra	Linnaeus, 1758	Common dragonet	Native	Bulgaria, Georgia, Russia, Turkey	Not evaluated	
Callionymus pusillus	Delaroche, 1809	Sailfin dragonet	Native	Bulgaria, Georgia, Romania, Russia, Turkey, Ukraine	Not evaluated	
Callionymus risso	Le Sueur, 1814	Risso's dragonet	Native	Bulgaria, Georgia, Romania, Russia, Turkey, Ukraine	Not evaluated	
Family: Gobiidae
Aphia minuta	(Risso, 1810)	Transparent goby	Native	Bulgaria, Georgia, Romania, Russia, Turkey, Ukraine	Not evaluated	
Babka gymnotrachelus	(Kessler, 1857)	Racer goby	Native	Bulgaria, Georgia, Romania, Turkey, Ukraine	Least concern	
Benthophiloides brauneri	Beling & Iljin, 1927	Beardless tadpole goby	Native	Bulgaria, Romania, Ukraine	Data deficient	
Benthophilus nudus	Berg, 1898	Black Sea tadpole-goby	Native	Bulgaria, Romania, Ukraine	Least concern	
Caspiosoma caspium	(Kessler, 1877)	Caspiosoma	Native	Bulgaria, Ukraine	Least concern	
Chromogobius quadrivittatus	(Steindachner, 1863)	Chestnut goby	Native	Bulgaria, Russia, Turkey	Least concern	
Gammogobius steinitzi	(Bath, 1971)	Steinitz's goby	Native	Bulgaria, Ukraine	Data deficient	
Gobius bucchichi	Steindachner, 1870	Bucchich's goby	Native	Bulgaria, Georgia, Russia, Turkey, Ukraine	Least concern	
Gobius cobitis	Pallas, 1814	Giant goby	Native	Bulgaria, Georgia, Romania, Russia, Turkey, Ukraine	Least concern	
Gobius cruentatus	Gmelin, 1789	Red-mouthed goby	Invasive	Bulgaria, Turkey, Ukraine	Not evaluated	
Gobius niger	Linnaeus, 1758	Black goby	Native	Bulgaria, Georgia, Romania, Russia, Turkey, Ukraine	Not evaluated	
Gobius paganellus	Linnaeus, 1758	Rock goby	Native	Bulgaria, Georgia, Romania, Russia, Turkey, Ukraine	Not evaluated	
Gobius xanthocephalus	Heymer & Zander, 1992	Yellow-headed goby	Native	Bulgaria, Georgia, Ukraine	Least concern	
Knipowitschia cameliae	Nalbant & Otel, 1995	Danube delta dwarf goby	Native	Bulgaria, Romania	Critically endangered	
Knipowitschia caucasica	(Berg, 1916)	Caucasian dwarf goby	Native	Bulgaria, Georgia, Romania, Turkey, Ukraine	Least concern	
Knipowitschia longecaudata	(Berg, 1916)	Longtail dwarf goby	Native	Bulgaria, Romania, Ukraine	Least concern	
Mesogobius batrachocephalus	(Pallas, 1814)	Toad goby	Native	Bulgaria, Georgia, Romania, Russia, Turkey, Ukraine	Least concern	
Millerigobius macrocephalus	(Kolombatovic, 1891)	Large-headed goby	Invasive	Bulgaria, Ukraine	Not evaluated	
Neogobius fluviatilis	(Pallas, 1814)	Monkey goby	Native	Bulgaria, Georgia, Romania, Russia, Turkey, Ukraine	Least concern	
Neogobius melanostomus	(Pallas, 1814)	Round goby	Native	Bulgaria, Georgia, Romania, Russia, Turkey, Ukraine	Least concern	
Pomatoschistus bathi	(Miller, 1982)	Bath's goby	Invasive	Bulgaria, Georgia, Russia, Ukraine	Not evaluated	
Pomatoschistus marmoratus	(Risso, 1810)	Marbled goby	Native	Bulgaria, Georgia, Romania, Russia, Turkey, Ukraine	Not evaluated	
Pomatoschistus minutus	(Pallas, 1770)	Sand goby	Native	Bulgaria, Romania, Turkey, Ukraine	Not evaluated	
Pomatoschistus pictus	Malm, 1865	Painted goby	Accidental	Bulgaria, Turkey, Ukraine	Not evaluated	
Ponticola cephalargoides	(Pinchuk, 1976)	Pinchuk's goby	Native	Bulgaria, Romania, Ukraine	Not evaluated	
Ponticola eurycephalus	(Kessler, 1874)	Mushroom goby	Native	Bulgaria, Georgia, Romania, Russia, Turkey, Ukraine	Least concern	
Ponticola kessleri	(Günther, 1861)	Bighead goby	Native	Bulgaria, Romania, Turkey, Ukraine	Least concern	
Ponticola platyrostris	(Pallas, 1814)	Flatsnout goby	Native	Bulgaria, Georgia, Romania, Russia, Turkey, Ukraine	Least concern	
Ponticola ratan	(Nordmann, 1840)	Ratan goby	Native	Bulgaria, Romania, Russia, Turkey, Ukraine	Not evaluated	
Ponticola syrman	(Nordmann, 1840)	Syrman goby	Native	Bulgaria, Romania, Russia, Ukraine	Least concern	
Proterorhinus marmoratus	(Pallas, 1814)	Marine tubenose goby	Native	Bulgaria, Georgia, Romania, Russia, Turkey, Ukraine	Least concern	
Tridentiger trigonocephalus	(Gill, 1859)	Chameleon goby	Invasive	Bulgaria, Ukraine	Not evaluated	
Zebrus zebrus	(Risso, 1827)	Zebra goby	Accidental	Turkey	Least concern	
Zosterisessor ophiocephalus	(Pallas, 1814)	Grass goby	Native	Bulgaria, Georgia, Romania, Russia, Turkey, Ukraine	Data deficient	
Family: Labridae
Coris julis	(Linnaeus, 1758)	Mediterranean rainbow wrasse	Native	Bulgaria, Romania, Turkey	Least concern	
Ctenolabrus rupestris	(Linnaeus, 1758)	Goldsinny wrasse	Native	Bulgaria, Georgia, Romania, Russia, Turkey, Ukraine	Not evaluated	
Labrus bergylta	Linnaeus, 1758	Ballan wrasse	Native	Bulgaria, Turkey	Least concern	
Labrus merula	Linnaeus, 1758	Brown wrasse	Native	Bulgaria, Turkey	Least concern	
Labrus viridis	Linnaeus, 1758	Green wrasse	Native	Bulgaria, Romania, Turkey, Ukraine	Vulnerable	
Symphodus cinereus	(Bonnaterre, 1788)	Grey wrasse	Native	Bulgaria, Georgia, Romania, Russia, Turkey, Ukraine	Least concern	
Symphodus ocellatus	Forsskål, 1775	Ocellated wrasse	Native	Bulgaria, Georgia, Romania, Russia, Turkey, Ukraine	Least concern	
Symphodus roissali	(Risso, 1810)	Five-spotted wrasse	Native	Bulgaria, Georgia, Romania, Russia, Turkey, Ukraine	Least concern	
Symphodus rostratus	(Bloch, 1791)	Pointed-snout wrasse	Native	Bulgaria, Georgia, Romania, Russia, Turkey, Ukraine	Least concern	
Symphodus tinca	(Linnaeus, 1758)	East Atlantic peacock wrasse	Native	Bulgaria, Georgia, Romania, Russia, Turkey, Ukraine	Least concern	
Family: Pomacentridae
Chromis chromis	(Linnaeus, 1758)	Damselfish	Native	Bulgaria, Georgia, Romania, Russia, Turkey, Ukraine	Not evaluated	
Family: Mugilidae
Chelon labrosus	(Risso, 1827)	Thicklip grey mullet	Native	Bulgaria,Turkey, Ukraine	Not evaluated	
Liza aurata	(Risso, 1810)	Golden grey mullet	Native	Bulgaria, Georgia, Romania, Russia, Turkey, Ukraine	Least concern	
Liza haematocheilus	(Temminck & Schlegel, 1845)	Redlip mullet	Introduced species	Bulgaria, Georgia, Romania, Russia, Turkey, Ukraine	Not evaluated	
Liza ramada	(Risso, 1810)	Thinlip mullet	Native	Bulgaria, Romania, Turkey, Ukraine	Not evaluated	
Liza saliens	(Risso, 1810)	Leaping mullet	Native	Bulgaria, Georgia, Romania, Russia, Turkey, Ukraine	Least concern	
Mugil cephalus	Linnaeus, 1758	Flathead mullet	Native	Bulgaria, Georgia, Romania, Russia, Turkey, Ukraine	Least concern	
Family: Carangidae
Lichia amia	Linnaeus, 1758	Leerfish	Native	Bulgaria, Turkey	Not evaluated	
Trachurus mediterraneus	(Steindachner, 1868)	Mediterranean horse mackerel	Native	Bulgaria, Georgia, Romania, Russia, Turkey, Ukraine	Not evaluated	
Trachurus trachurus	(Linnaeus, 1758)	Atlantic horse mackerel	Native	Bulgaria, Romania, Turkey, Ukraine	Not evaluated	
Naucrates ductor	(Linnaeus, 1758)	Pilot fish	Accidental	Bulgaria, Turkey, Ukraine	Not evaluated	
Family: Centracanthidae
Spicara maena	(Linnaeus, 1758)	Blotched picarel	Native	Bulgaria,Russia, Turkey, Ukraine	Not evaluated	
Spicara smaris	(Linnaeus, 1758)	Picarel	Native	Bulgaria, Georgia, Romania, Russia, Turkey, Ukraine	Not evaluated	
Family: Centrarchidae
Lepomis gibbosus	(Linnaeus, 1758)	Pumpkinseed	Invasive	Bulgaria, Romania, Ukraine	Not evaluated	
Family: Chaetodontidae
Heniochus acuminatus	(Linnaeus, 1758)	Pennant coralfish	Accidental	Bulgaria, Ukraine	Least concern	
Family: Moronidae
Dicentrarchus labrax	(Linnaeus, 1758)	European seabass	Native	Bulgaria, Georgia, Romania, Russia, Turkey, Ukraine	Least concern	
Morone saxatilis	(Walbaum, 1792)	Striped bass	Introduced species	Bulgaria, Russia, Ukraine	Not evaluated	
Family: Mullidae
Mullus barbatus	Linnaeus, 1758	Red mullet	Native	Bulgaria, Georgia, Romania, Russia, Turkey, Ukraine	Not evaluated	
Mullus surmuletus	Linnaeus, 1758	Surmullet	Native	Bulgaria	Not evaluated	
Family: Percidae
Percarina demidoffii	Nordmann, 1840	Common percarina	Native	Bulgaria, Romania, Ukraine	Near threatened	
Percarina maeotica	Kuznetsov, 1888	Azov percarina	Native	Bulgaria, Russia, Ukraine	Least concern	
Sander marinus	(Cuvier, 1828)	Estuarine perch	Native	Bulgaria, Ukraine	Data deficient	
Family: Pomatomidae
Pomatomus saltatrix	(Linnaeus, 1766)	Bluefish	Native	Bulgaria, Georgia, Romania, Russia, Turkey, Ukraine	Not evaluated	
Family: Echeneidae
Echeneis naucrates	(Linnaeus, 1758)	Live sharksucker	Accidental	Bulgaria, Turkey	Not evaluated	
Family: Sciaenidae
Argyrosomus regius	Asso, 1801	Meagre	Native	Bulgaria	Not evaluated	
Sciaena umbra	(Linnaeus, 1758)	Brown meagre	Native	Bulgaria, Georgia, Romania, Russia, Turkey, Ukraine	Not evaluated	
Umbrina cirrosa	(Linnaeus, 1758)	Shi drum	Native	Bulgaria, Georgia, Romania, Russia, Turkey, Ukraine	Not evaluated	
Family: Serranidae
Serranus cabrilla	(Linnaeus, 1758)	Comber	Native	Bulgaria, Romania, Turkey, Ukraine	Not evaluated	
Serranus scriba	(Linnaeus, 1758)	Painted comber	Native	Bulgaria, Georgia, Romania, Russia, Turkey, Ukraine	Not evaluated	
Family: Sparidae
Boops boops	(Linnaeus, 1758)	Bogue	Native	Bulgaria, Georgia, Romania, Russia, Turkey, Ukraine	Not evaluated	
Dentex dentex	(Linnaeus, 1758)	Common dentex	Native	Bulgaria, Romania, Turkey, Ukraine	Not evaluated	
Diplodus annularis	(Linnaeus, 1758)	Annular seabream	Native	Bulgaria, Georgia, Romania, Russia, Turkey, Ukraine	Not evaluated	
Diplodus puntazzo	Cetti, 1777	Sharpsnout seabream	Native	Bulgaria, Georgia, Romania, Russia, Turkey, Ukraine	Not evaluated	
Diplodus sargus	(Linnaeus, 1758)	Sargo	Native	Bulgaria, Turkey, Ukraine	Not evaluated	
Diplodus vulgaris	(Geoffroy Saint-Hilaire, 1817)	Common two-banded seabream	Native	Bulgaria, Turkey	Not evaluated	
Lithognathus mormyrus	(Linnaeus, 1758)	Sand steenbras	Accidental	Bulgaria	Not evaluated	
Oblada melanura	(Linnaeus, 1758)	Saddled seabream	Native	Bulgaria, Turkey	Not evaluated	
Pagellus erythrinus	(Linnaeus, 1758)	Common pandora	Native	Bulgaria, Georgia, Romania, Russia, Turkey, Ukraine	Not evaluated	
Sarpa salpa	(Linnaeus, 1758)	Salema porgy	Native	Bulgaria, Georgia, Romania, Turkey, Ukraine	Not evaluated	
Sparus aurata	Linnaeus, 1758	Gilt-head bream	Native	Bulgaria, Georgia, Romania,Turkey, Ukraine	Not evaluated	
Spondyliosoma cantharus	(Linnaeus, 1758)	Black seabream	Native	Bulgaria, Turkey	Not evaluated	
Family: Sphyraenidae
Sphyraena pinguis	(Günther, 1874)	Red barracuda	Accidental	Bulgaria, Ukraine	Not evaluated	
Sphyraena sphyraena	(Linnaeus, 1758)	European barracuda	Native	Bulgaria, Romania, Ukraine	Not evaluated	
Family: Trichiuridae
Lepidopus caudatus	(Euphrasen, 1788)	Silver scabbardfish	Accidental	Bulgaria, Turkey	Not evaluated	
Family: Scombridae
Auxis rochei	(Lacépède, 1800)	Bullet tuna	Native	Bulgaria, Turkey	Least concern	
Euthynnus alletteratus	(Rafinesque, 1810)	Little tunny	Native	Bulgaria, Turkey	Least concern	
Sarda sarda	Bloch, 1793	Atlantic bonito	Native	Bulgaria, Georgia, Romania, Russia, Turkey, Ukraine	Least concern	
Scomber colias	Gmelin, 1789	Atlantic chub mackerel	Native	Bulgaria, Georgia, Romania, Russia, Turkey, Ukraine	Least concern	
Scomber scombrus	Linnaeus, 1758	Atlantic mackerel	Native	Bulgaria, Georgia, Romania, Russia, Turkey, Ukraine	Least concern	
Thunnus thynnus	(Linnaeus, 1758)	Atlantic bluefin tuna	Native	Bulgaria, Georgia, Romania, Russia, Turkey, Ukraine	Endangered	
Family: Xiphiidae
Xiphias gladius	Linnaeus, 1758	Swordfish	Native	Bulgaria, Georgia, Romania, Russia, Turkey, Ukraine	Least concern	
Family: Ammodytidae
Gymnammodytes cicerelus	(Rafinesque, 1810)	Mediterranean sand eel	Native	Bulgaria, Georgia, Romania, Russia, Turkey, Ukraine	Not evaluated	
Family: Trachinidae
Trachinus draco	Linnaeus, 1758	Greater weever	Native	Bulgaria, Georgia, Romania, Russia, Turkey, Ukraine	Not evaluated	
Family: Uranoscopidae
Uranoscopus scaber	Linnaeus, 1758	Atlantic stargazer	Native	Bulgaria, Georgia, Romania, Russia, Turkey, Ukraine	Not evaluated	
Ordo: Pleuronectiformes
Family: Scophthalmidae
Scophthalmus maeoticus	(Pallas, 1814)	Black Sea turbot	Native	Bulgaria, Georgia, Romania, Russia, Turkey, Ukraine	Not evaluated	
Scophthalmus rhombus	(Linnaeus, 1758)	Brill	Native	Bulgaria, Georgia, Russia, Turkey, Ukraine	Not evaluated	
Family: Bothidae
Arnoglossus kessleri	(Schmidt, 1915)	Scaldback	Native	Bulgaria, Georgia, Russia, Turkey, Ukraine	Data deficient	
Arnoglossus laterna	(Walbaum, 1792)	Mediterranean scaldfish	Native	Bulgaria, Turkey	Not evaluated	
Arnoglossus thori	(Kyle, 1913)	Thor's scaldfish	Native	Bulgaria, Turkey	Not evaluated	
Family: Pleuronectidae
Platichthys flesus	Linnaeus, 1758	European flounder	Native	Bulgaria, Georgia, Romania, Russia, Turkey, Ukraine	Least concern	
Family: Soleidae
Buglossidium luteum	(Risso, 1810)	Solenette	Native	Bulgaria, Turkey	Not evaluated	
Microchirus variegatus	(Donovan, 1808)	Thickback sole	Native	Bulgaria, Turkey	Not evaluated	
Pegusa nasuta	(Pallas, 1814)	Blackhand sole	Native	Bulgaria, Georgia, Romania, Russia, Turkey, Ukraine	Not evaluated	
Solea solea	(Linnaeus, 1758)	Common sole	Native	Bulgaria, Turkey	Not evaluated	
Ordo: Tetraodontiformes
Family: Balistidae
Balistes capriscus	(Gmelin, 1789)	Grey triggerfish	Native	Bulgaria, Turkey, Ukraine	Not evaluated	

== See also ==
- List of fishes of the Mediterranean Sea
- List of fishes of the North Sea
- List of fish in Ukraine
