= Boldyrev =

Boldyrev (masculine, Russian: Болдырев) or Boldyreva (feminine, Russian: Болдырева) is a Russian surname. Notable people with the surname include:

- Danylo Boldyrev (born 1992), Ukrainian speed climber
- Vasily Boldyrev (1875–1933), Russian general
- Vladimir Boldyrev (born 1949), Russian general
- Elena Boldyreva (born 1961), Russian chemist and researcher
