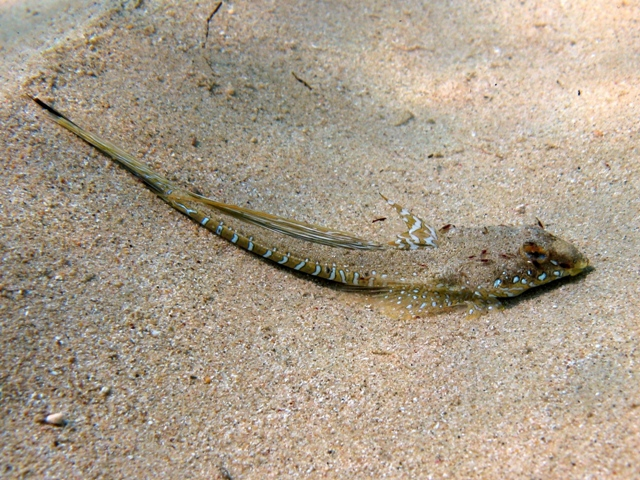
- Male salfin dragonet in Koufonisi, Greece

Conservation status
- Least Concern (IUCN 3.1)

Scientific classification
- Kingdom: Animalia
- Phylum: Chordata
- Class: Actinopterygii
- Order: Syngnathiformes
- Family: Callionymidae
- Genus: Callionymus
- Species: C. pusillus

Binomial name
- Callionymus pusillus Delaroche, 1809

Synonyms
- Callionymus festivus Pallas, 1814

= Sailfin dragonet =

Species of fish

The sailfin dragonet (Callionymus pusillus) is a species of dragonet common in the Eastern Atlantic, where it occurs on the Portuguese coast to as far north as Lisbon and south to Morocco, and also in the northern Mediterranean including the Adriatic, Aegean and Black seas as well as the coasts of Lebanon and Israel. It occurs on the southern Mediterranean shore as far east as Tunisia. Males of this species grow to a length of 14 centimetres (5.5 in) TL while females reach a length of 10 centimetres (3.9 in) TL. In the areas of the Mediterranean where it occurs it is one of the most common dragonet species, as it is the only species that has been recorded within many protected areas. It is a benthic species which occurs in shallow waters and prefers sandy bottoms down to 100 metres (330 ft). The males are territorial, aggressively defend their territories from other males and like other dragonets this species undergoes complex breeding behaviour which has 4 phases. This starts with courtship, the male and female then form a pair before ascending to the surface where they release eggs and milt. The spawning season runs from May to August in the Mediterranean and the eggs and larvae are pelagic. This species feeds mainly on small benthic invertebrates such as worms and small crustaceans.

The sailfin dragonet has three upwardly directed spines on the preoperculum and differs from other species of dragonet by having a first dorsal fin which is lower than the second dorsal fin. The second dorsal fin has long rays which extend into long filaments. These filaments extend beyond the caudal fin. The male is brightly coloured with 14 to 16 silvery transverse lines fringed with black on its body and with blue streaks on the fins. The female is beige with small whitish spots.
