= Dybowski =

Dybowski (feminine: Dybowska; plural: Dybowscy) is a Polish surname. Notable people with this surname include:

- Benedykt Dybowski (1833–1930), Polish naturalist and physician
- Jean Dybowski (1856–1928), French agronomist and explorer
- Władysław Dybowski (1838–1910), Polish zoologist
