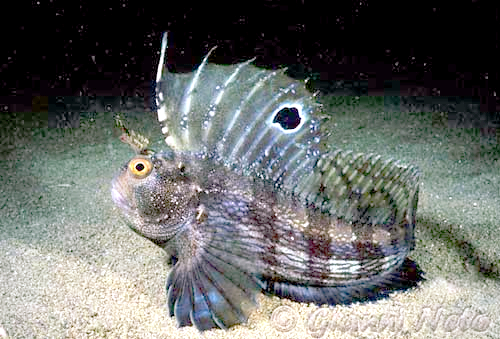
- Blennius ocellaris

Scientific classification
- Kingdom: Animalia
- Phylum: Chordata
- Class: Actinopterygii
- Order: Blenniiformes
- Family: Blenniidae
- Subfamily: Blenniinae
- Genus: Blennius; Linnaeus, 1758

= Blennius =

Blennius Temporal range: 20–0 Ma Late Miocene to Present

Genus of fishes

Blennius is a genus of combtooth blennies in the family Blenniidae. Its members include Blennius ocellaris, the butterfly blenny.

== Species ==
There are currently two recognized species in this genus:

- Blennius normani Poll, 1949
- Blennius ocellaris Linnaeus, 1758 (butterfly blenny)
