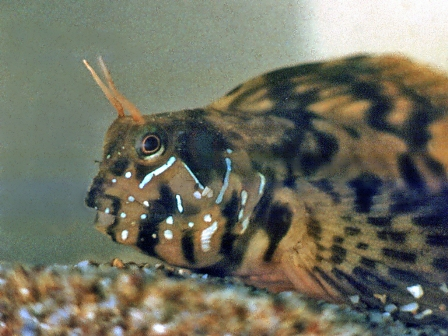
- Male

Conservation status
- Least Concern (IUCN 3.1)

Scientific classification
- Kingdom: Animalia
- Phylum: Chordata
- Class: Actinopterygii
- Order: Blenniiformes
- Family: Blenniidae
- Subfamily: Salariinae
- Genus: Aidablennius; Whitley, 1947
- Species: A. sphynx

Binomial name
- Aidablennius sphynx (Valenciennes, 1836)

Synonyms
- Aidablennius sphinx (Günther, 1861); Blennius sphinx Günther, 1861; Blennius sphynx Valenciennes, 1836

= Sphinx blenny =

Species of fish

The sphinx blenny (Aidablennius sphynx) is a species of combtooth blenny, and the only species in the genus Aidablennius. It was described by Achille Valenciennes in 1836, originally under the genus Blennius, and was later reassigned under "Aidablennius" by Gilbert Percy Whitley in 1947. It is a subtropical blenny known from Morocco, in the eastern Atlantic Ocean, and also from the Mediterranean and Black Seas. Sphinx blennies inhabit shallow, rocky waters in the littoral zone, with sunlight exposure. They feed primarily on benthic algae, weeds and invertebrates. Sphinx blennies can measure up to 8 centimetres (3.1 in) long in total length.

== Reproduction ==
In mating, the blennies form distinct pairs, and the females lay up to 7000 eggs in a sitting, which are then guarded in burrows by the males. Males are known to cannibalize dead eggs to prevent infection spread amongst the healthy eggs, although in smaller broods they have also been reported consuming living eggs. It is believed that this is due to limited feeding opportunities for the males during breeding, as a result of their restriction to the nests. FishBase considers the blennies to be of Low Vulnerability, with a reproductive doubling time of less than 15 months.
