= Danube delta dwarf goby =

Conservation status
- Critically endangered, possibly extinct (IUCN 3.1)

Scientific classification
- Kingdom: Animalia
- Phylum: Chordata
- Class: Actinopterygii
- Order: Gobiiformes
- Family: Oxudercidae
- Genus: Knipowitschia
- Species: K. cameliae

Binomial name
- Knipowitschia cameliae Nalbant & Oţel, 1995

Species of fish

Knipowitschia cameliae, the Danube delta dwarf goby, is a species of goby known only from the brackish and fresh waters of a lagoon south of the Danube Delta in Romania. This fish is a shallow water species being found in waters less than 1 metre (3.3 ft) deep. This species can reach a length of 3.2 centimetres (1.3 in) SL. This species has been assessed by the IUCN as Critically Endangered, possibly extinct, it was last recorded in 1994 and surveys in that year and 1998 have failed to record the species. The specific name honours Camelia Iliana Nalbant, the wife of the senior author.
