= Beling =

Beling is a surname. Notable people with the surname include:

- Dagmar Beling (1929–2023), Swedish painter
- Fernanda Neves Beling (born 1982), Brazilian basketball player
- Geoffrey Beling (1907–1992), Sri Lankan artist and educator
- Helen Beling (1914–2001), American sculptor
- John Kingsman Beling (1919–2010), United States Navy Rear Admiral
- Maria Beling (1915–1994), German soprano and actress
- William Wright Beling II (1867–1928), Sri Lankan painter
