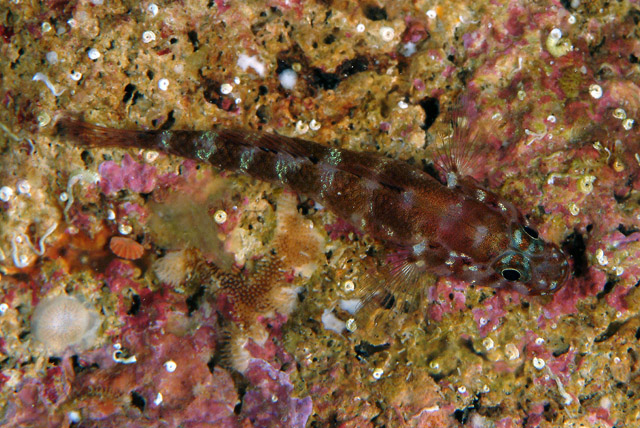

Conservation status
- Least Concern (IUCN 3.1)

Scientific classification
- Kingdom: Animalia
- Phylum: Chordata
- Class: Actinopterygii
- Order: Gobiiformes
- Family: Gobiidae
- Genus: Gammogobius; Bath, 1971
- Species: G. steinitzi

Binomial name
- Gammogobius steinitzi Bath, 1971

= Steinitz's goby =

Species of fish

Steinitz's goby (Gammogobius steinitzi) is a species of goby. It is native to the Mediterranean Sea near Marseille. It has been recently recorded in the Adriatic Sea in Croatia, Tyrrhenian Sea in Italy, and in the Black Sea in Ukraine. This species can be found in underwater grottoes in inshore waters at depths of 2 to 15 metres (6.6 to 49.2 ft). Steinitz's goby can reach a length of 3.8 centimetres (1.5 in) SL. Its name honours the marine biologist and herpetologist Heinz Steinitz (1909–1971) of the Hebrew University, Jerusalem.
