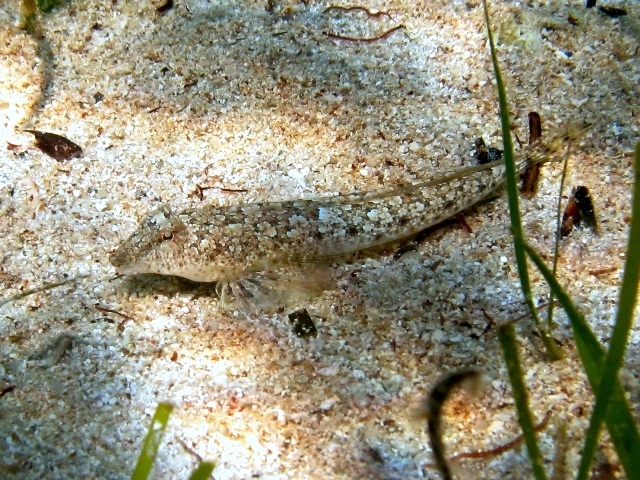

Conservation status
- Least Concern (IUCN 3.1)

Scientific classification
- Kingdom: Animalia
- Phylum: Chordata
- Class: Actinopterygii
- Division: Teleostei
- Order: Syngnathiformes
- Family: Callionymidae
- Genus: Callionymus
- Species: C. risso

Binomial name
- Callionymus risso Lesueur, 1814

Synonyms
- Callionymus belenus Risso, 1827; Callionymus morissonii Risso, 1827; Callionymus rissoi Lesueur, 1814

= Risso's dragonet =

Species of fish

Risso's dragonet (Callionymus risso) is a species of dragonet native to the Mediterranean Sea as well as the Black Sea and rarely found off of Portugal in the Atlantic Ocean. This species can be found at depths of from 15 to 150 metres (49 to 492 ft). Males of this species grows to a length of 11 centimetres (4.3 in) TL while females reach a length of 6.5 centimetres (2.6 in).
