= Rathke =

Rathke is a surname. Notable people with the surname include:

- Jens Rathke (1769–1855), Norwegian zoologist
- Martin Rathke (1793–1860), German embryologist and anatomist
  - Bernhard Rathke (1840–1923), German chemist, son of Martin
- Wade Rathke, founder and former Chief Organizer of Association of Community Organizations for Reform Now (ACORN)
