= Walbaum =

Walbaum is a German surname. Notable people with the surname include:

- Johann Julius Walbaum (1724–1799), German physician, naturalist and taxonomist
- Johannes Walbaum (born 1987), German footballer
- Justus Erich Walbaum (1768–1837), German type designer and punchcutter
  - Walbaum (typeface), the Didone typeface named after him
