= Caspiosoma caspium =

Conservation status
- Least Concern (IUCN 3.1)

Scientific classification
- Kingdom: Animalia
- Phylum: Chordata
- Class: Actinopterygii
- Division: Teleostei
- Order: Gobiiformes
- Family: Gobiidae
- Genus: Caspiosoma; Iljin, 1927
- Species: C. caspium

Binomial name
- Caspiosoma caspium (Kessler, 1877)

Synonyms
- Gobiosoma caspium Kessler, 1877

Species of fish

Caspiosoma caspium is a species of Ponto-Caspian goby native to the deltas of rivers inflows to the north-western Black Sea: Dnieper up to Berislav, also in the Dnieper-Bug Estuary and Berezan Estuary, Danube, Dniester with the estuary, Cuciurgan Reservoir. Found in the delta of the Don River, Volga, central and northern parts of the Caspian Sea and rivers flowing into the Sea of Azov. It can be found at depths of from 2 to 8 metres (6.6 to 26.2 ft). This species can reach a length of 4.5 centimetres (1.8 in) TL. It is currently the only known member of its genus.
