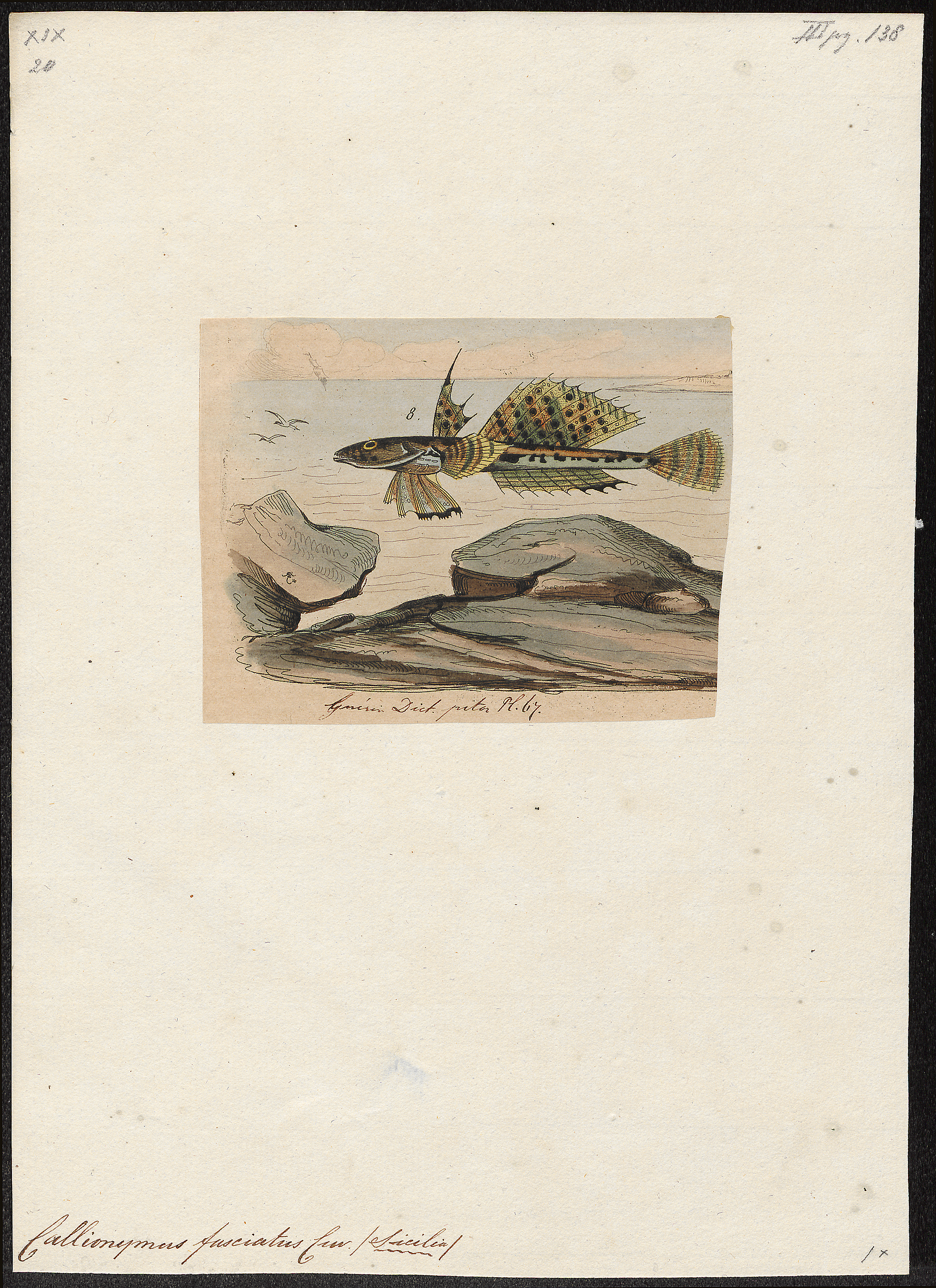

Conservation status
- Least Concern (IUCN 3.1)

Scientific classification
- Kingdom: Animalia
- Phylum: Chordata
- Class: Actinopterygii
- Order: Syngnathiformes
- Family: Callionymidae
- Genus: Callionymus
- Species: C. fasciatus

Binomial name
- Callionymus fasciatus Valenciennes, 1837

= Banded dragonet =

Species of fish

The banded dragonet (Callionymus fasciatus) is a species of dragonet native to the Mediterranean Sea from the Gulf of Genoa to the western Aegean Sea. Also known from the southern and eastern Black Sea. It prefers sandy substrates where its diet consists of benthic invertebrates.

Its body is scaleless, elongated and tapers posteriorly, it has a triangular head with a short snout which is shorter than the diameter of the eye and a terminal, protractile mouth. The oval eyes are placed at the top of the head and have a diameter about one third of the length of the head. The operculum is connected directly to the body and the preopercular spine is enlarged and the other spines in the preoperculum face forwards and upwards and have robust bases. The gill opening is much reduced, forming pores which are positioned dorsally. The first dorsal fin is tall and rectangular in shape with has 4 spiny rays, the first of which is higher than the others. The second dorsal has 10 branched soft rays, with the last split at its base is veil-like. The anal fin is directly beneath the second dorsal fin and is of equal length but is not as tall. The pectoral fins are rounded and broad. The ventral fins are well developed with terminally branched rays. The caudal fin is very wide and fan-like. The colour of the body varies from olive-green to reddish, with 5–7 dark brown saddle-like blotches across its back. This species is sexually dimorphic and, in males, the second dorsal fin has vertical rows of dark spots placed in a pattern which form diagonal rows. It reaches a maximum length of 12 centimetres (4.7 in) for males and 8 centimetres (3.1 in) for females.

The banded dragonet occurs over sandy and muddy substrate ate depths ranging from 20 metres (66 ft) to 60 metres (200 ft), although it has been reported from as deep as 400 metres (1,300 ft). It is a territorial species and the territory is aggressively defended. This species feeds on small invertebrates, especially annelids and crustaceans. In the Sea of Marmara its preferred substrate consists of fragmented shells and sand.
