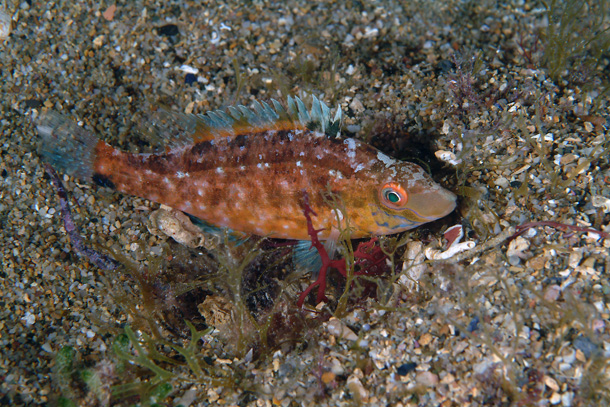

Conservation status
- Least Concern (IUCN 3.1)

Scientific classification
- Kingdom: Animalia
- Phylum: Chordata
- Class: Actinopterygii
- Division: Teleostei
- Order: Labriformes
- Family: Labridae
- Genus: Symphodus
- Species: S. cinereus

Binomial name
- Symphodus cinereus (Bonnaterre, 1788)

Synonyms
- Labrus cinereus Bonnaterre, 1788; Crenilabrus cinereus (Bonnaterre, 1788); Symphodus cinereus cinereus (Bonnaterre, 1788); Labrus griseus J. F. Gmelin, 1789; Crenilabrus griseus (J. F. Gmelin, 1789); Crenilabrus staitii Nordmann, 1840; Symphodus cinereus staitii (Nordmann, 1840)

= Grey wrasse =

Species of fish

The grey wrasse (Symphodus cinereus) is a species of wrasse native to the eastern Atlantic Ocean and along the coasts of the Mediterranean Sea to the Black Sea. It inhabits coastal waters, preferring beds of eelgrass at depths from 1 to 20 m (3.3 to 65.6 ft). It can reach 16 cm (6.3 in) in total length, though most do not exceed 8 cm (3.1 in). It is important to local peoples as a food fish and is popular as a game fish. It can also be found in the aquarium trade.
