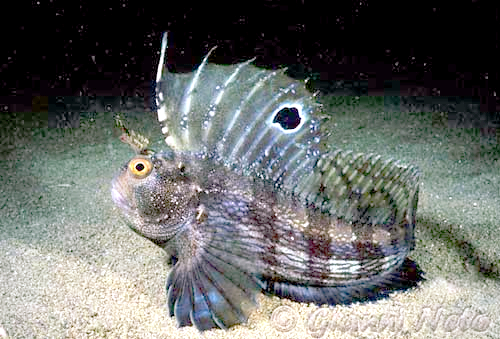

Conservation status
- Least Concern (IUCN 3.1)

Scientific classification
- Kingdom: Animalia
- Phylum: Chordata
- Class: Actinopterygii
- Order: Blenniiformes
- Family: Blenniidae
- Genus: Blennius
- Species: B. ocellaris

Binomial name
- Blennius ocellaris Linnaeus, 1758

= Butterfly blenny =

Species of fish

The butterfly blenny (Blennius ocellaris) is a small marine blenniid fish of Northern and Western Europe, as well as the Mediterranean Sea and Black Sea and Morocco. It is usually found at a depth of 10–400 metres (33–1,312 ft) down, especially in areas with a rocky floor.

== Description ==
The butterfly blenny has a deep body at the front, tapering rather quickly to the caudal peduncle. It can grow as large as 20 cm (8 in) in length. It has 11 to 12 dorsal spines, 14 to 16 dorsal soft rays, 2 anal spines and 15 to 16 anal soft rays. It has tentacles on the nasal opening, above the eye and on the nape near the first dorsal fin ray. The lateral line is discontinuous. The front part of the dorsal fin is much higher than the remainder of the fin, and the anal fin is also long, running half the body length. The pelvic fins are set well forward and are divided in two. This fish is a mottled brownish-grey, with five to seven dark vertical bars. There is a large bluish-black eyespot surrounded by a white ring on the 6th and 7th rays of the dorsal fin.

== Distribution and habitat ==
The butterfly blenny has a range that extends from the Mediterranean Sea, up the coast of Spain, Portugal and France to the English Channel and the Irish Sea. It is found over rocky substrates covered with seaweed and this means that it is seldom caught in trawls, and may be more common than it seems. It occurs in the subtidal zone, and its depth range is down to about 100 m (330 ft).

== Reproduction ==
It spawns in late spring (as late as June in the English Channel) and hides the eggs under an abandoned shell; the male guards the eggs. An individual near Plymouth was found to be nesting inside the cavity of a large thigh bone.
