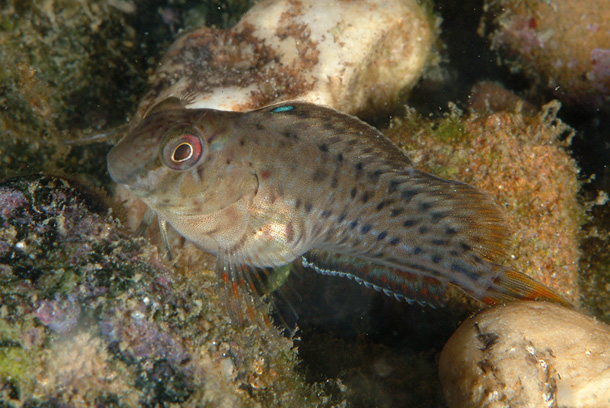

Conservation status
- Least Concern (IUCN 3.1)

Scientific classification
- Kingdom: Animalia
- Phylum: Chordata
- Class: Actinopterygii
- Division: Teleostei
- Order: Blenniiformes
- Family: Blenniidae
- Genus: Parablennius
- Species: P. sanguinolentus

Binomial name
- Parablennius sanguinolentus (Pallas, 1814)

Synonyms
- Blennius palmicornis Valenciennes, 1836; Blennius pholis non Linnaeus, 1758; Blennius sanguinolentus Pallas, 1814

= Rusty blenny =

Species of fish

The rusty blenny or Black Sea blenny (Parablennius sanguinolentus) is a species of combtooth blenny found in the eastern Atlantic: Loire mouth, France to Morocco including the Mediterranean and Black Sea. This species reaches a length of 20 centimetres (7.9 in) TL.
