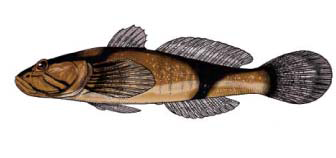

Conservation status
- Data Deficient (IUCN 3.1)

Scientific classification
- Kingdom: Animalia
- Phylum: Chordata
- Class: Actinopterygii
- Order: Gobiiformes
- Family: Gobiidae
- Genus: Benthophiloides
- Species: B. brauneri

Binomial name
- Benthophiloides brauneri Beling & Iljin, 1927

= Brauner's tadpole-goby =

Species of fish

Brauner's tadpole-goby (Benthophiloides brauneri) is a species of goby, a benthophilic fish native to the fresh and brackish waters of the Black Sea, the Caspian Sea and the Sea of Azov as well as their surrounding rivers and estuaries. Despite the wide distribution, very few observations overall of this fish exist, and just one from the Caspian basin. It has been found in still waters at depths down to around 15 metres (49 ft). Males of this species can reach a length of 7.2 centimetres (2.8 in) SL while females only reach 5.1 centimetres (2.0 in) SL. This fish only lives for one year.

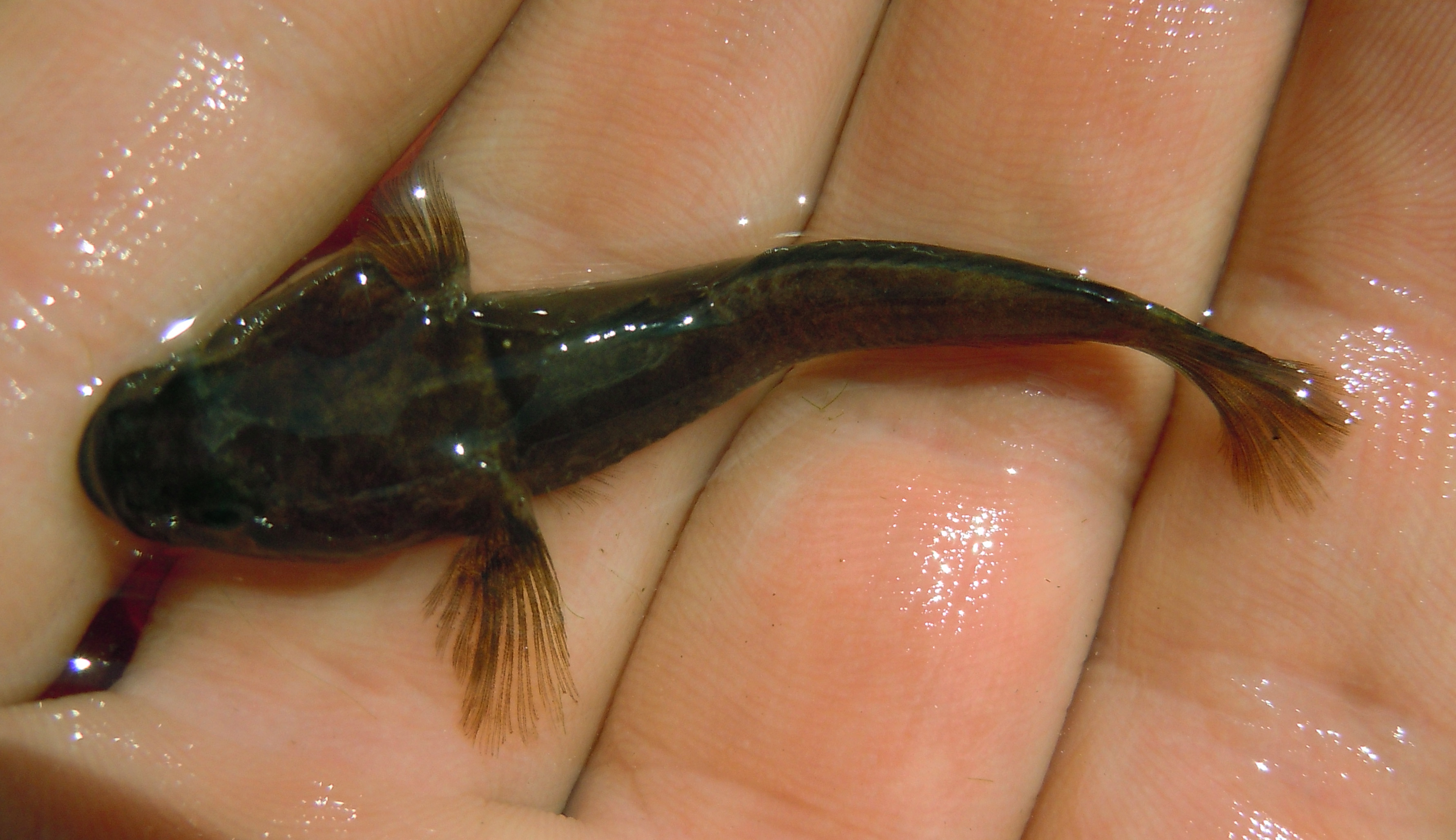
Benthophiloides brauneri from the Southern Bug River near the village of Rakove, Mykolaiv Oblast, South Ukraine
