= Scaldback =

Conservation status
- Data Deficient (IUCN 3.1)

Scientific classification
- Kingdom: Animalia
- Phylum: Chordata
- Class: Actinopterygii
- Order: Carangiformes
- Suborder: Pleuronectoidei
- Family: Bothidae
- Genus: Arnoglossus
- Species: A. kessleri

Binomial name
- Arnoglossus kessleri (Schmidt, 1915)

Synonyms
- Arnoglossus grohamanni (non Bonaparte, 1837)

Species of flatfish

Scaldback (Arnoglossus kessleri) is a species of bottom feeder benthic flatfish belonging to the family Bothidae. It is widespread in the Mediterranean and the Black Sea. It is a marine, subtropical, demersal fish, which grows to up to 10 cm (3.9 in) long.
