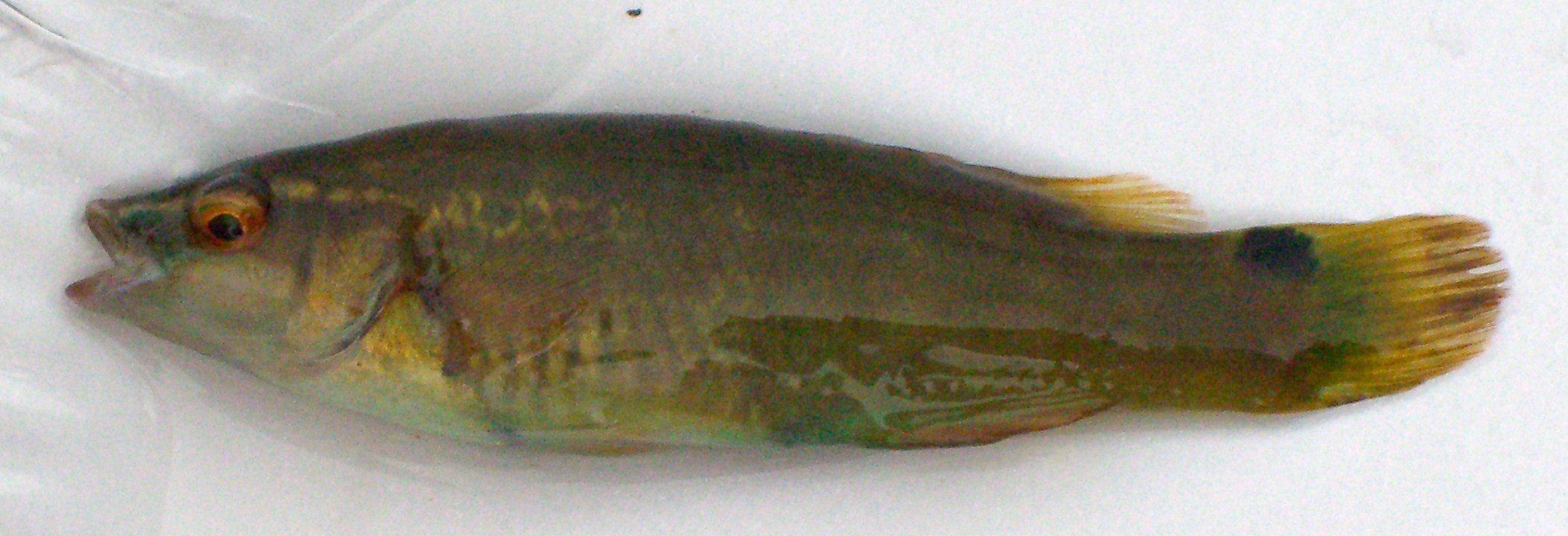

Conservation status
- Least Concern (IUCN 3.1)

Scientific classification
- Kingdom: Animalia
- Phylum: Chordata
- Class: Actinopterygii
- Division: Teleostei
- Order: Labriformes
- Family: Labridae
- Subfamily: Labrinae
- Genus: Ctenolabrus; Valenciennes, 1839
- Species: C. rupestris

Binomial name
- Ctenolabrus rupestris (Linnaeus, 1758)

Synonyms
- Genus: Cynaedus Swainson, 1839; Species: Labrus rupestris Linnaeus, 1758; Ctenolabrus suillus (Linnaeus, 1758) (ambiguous name)

= Goldsinny wrasse =

Species of fish

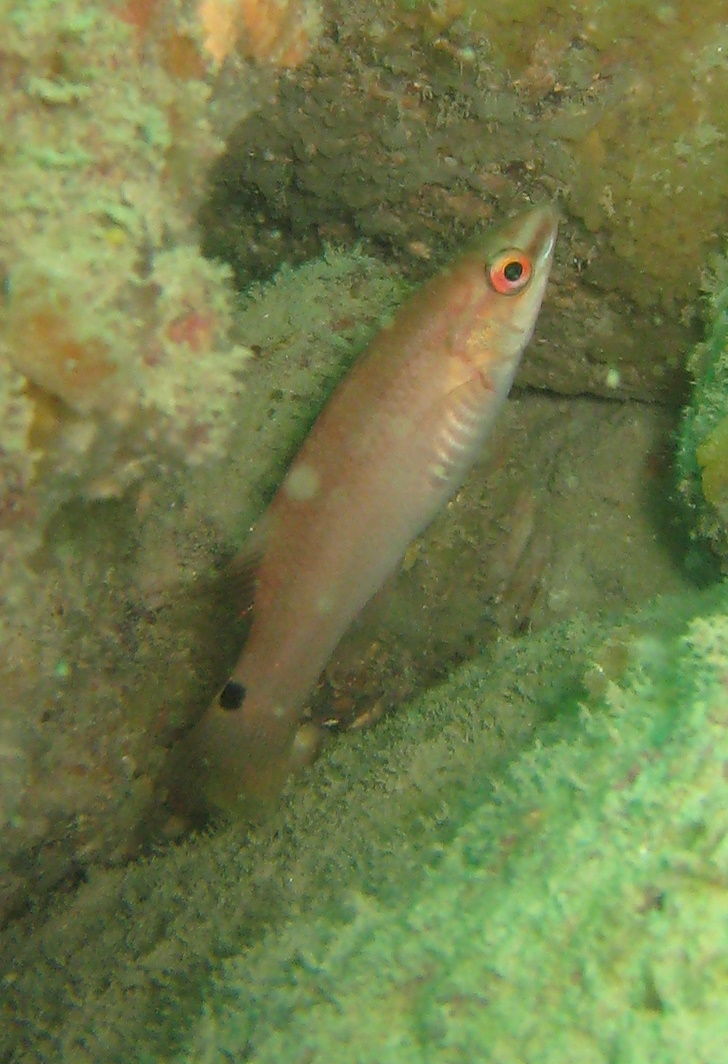
Ctenolabrus rupestris Saint-Quay-Portrieux

The goldsinny wrasse (Ctenolabrus rupestris) is a species of ray-finned fish, a wrasse from the family Labridae which is native to the eastern Atlantic Ocean and associated seas. This species is the only known member of its genus.

== Description ==
The goldsinny wrasse can reach a total length of 18 cm (7.1 in), though most do not exceed 12 cm (4.7 in). Its coloration is brown, greenish or orange-red and there are two noticeable dark spots which readily identify it from other eastern Atlantic wrasses, one on the dorsal fin and one situated on the caudal peduncle immediately in front of the caudal fin. It has a slender body with a small, pointed head and large eyes. The large, fleshy lipped mouth is equipped with two rows of small teeth in each jaw.

== Distribution ==
The goldsinny wrasse is found in the eastern Atlantic Ocean from Norway south as far as Morocco. It is also found throughout the western and central Mediterranean Sea as far as Antalya in Turkey, but it is absent from the far eastern Mediterranean. It extends through the Sea of Marmara into the Black Sea.

== Habitat and biology ==
The goldsinny wrasse is normally found in areas dominated by rock or by boulders and requires there to be many crevices for it to hide in. It is most frequently recorded at depths of between 10–50 metres (33–164 ft) but it is infrequently recorded in rockpools near the low water mark. Their diet consists of bryozoan, small crustaceans and molluscs. it is often associated with beds of algae and eelgrass. These wrasses attain maturity at two years of age, with the life span being up to eight years, and they do not display sexual dimorphism. spawning takes place from the winter into summer. When breeding the males defend territories. Spawning happens in mid water and when the pelagic eggs hatch the larvae are planktonic.

== Human uses ==
The goldsinny wrasse is fond of sea lice and has been used to clean salmon in commercial farms together with the Ballan wrasse. Both these wrasses are not easy to retain in the salmon farms, as they escape through the nets, being significantly smaller than the salmon. This species is caught as a food fish by local indigenous peoples and is popular as a game fish. It is also a popular fish for display in public aquaria.
