= Syngnathus schmidti =

Conservation status
- Data Deficient (IUCN 3.1)

Scientific classification
- Domain: Eukaryota
- Kingdom: Animalia
- Phylum: Chordata
- Class: Actinopterygii
- Order: Syngnathiformes
- Family: Syngnathidae
- Genus: Syngnathus
- Species: S. schmidti

Binomial name
- Syngnathus schmidti Popov, 1927

Species of fish

Syngnathus schmidti, the Black Sea pelagic pipefish or Schmidt's pipefish, is a pipefish species that inhabits the Black Sea and Sea of Azov. A freshwater/brackishwater fish, it can grow up to 11 centimetres (4.3 in) long and usually lives at a depth of 1 to 10 metres (3.3 to 32.8 ft), although it can live as deep as 100 metres (330 ft). The specific name honours the Danish zoologist Ernst Johannes Schmidt (1877–1933).
