= Thickly snouted pipefish =

Syngnathus variegatus

Conservation status
- Data Deficient (IUCN 3.1)

Scientific classification
- Kingdom: Animalia
- Phylum: Chordata
- Class: Actinopterygii
- Division: Teleostei
- Order: Syngnathiformes
- Family: Syngnathidae
- Genus: Syngnathus
- Species: S. variegatus

Binomial name
- Syngnathus variegatus Pallas, 1814

Species of fish

Thickly snouted pipefish (Syngnathus variegatus) is a pipefish species which inhabits the Black Sea and Sea of Azov. It is a marine, demersal, ovoviviparous fish.
