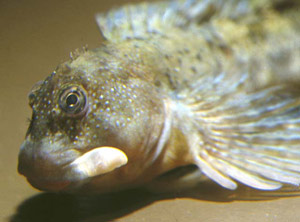

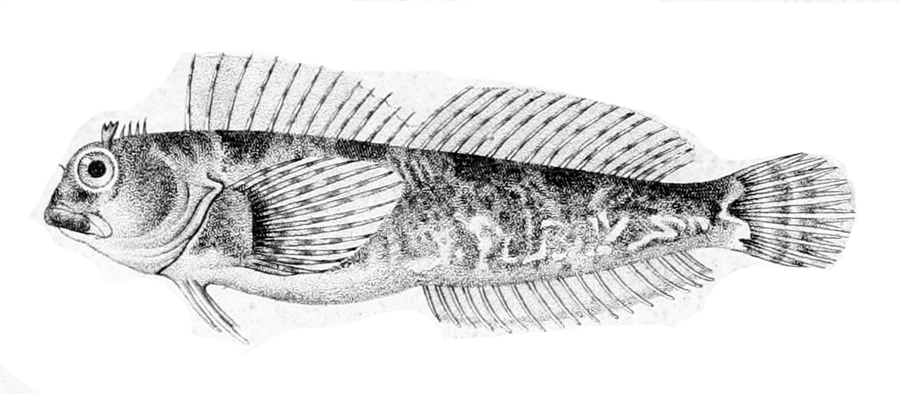

Conservation status
- Least Concern (IUCN 3.1)

Scientific classification
- Kingdom: Animalia
- Phylum: Chordata
- Class: Actinopterygii
- Division: Teleostei
- Order: Blenniiformes
- Family: Blenniidae
- Subfamily: Salariinae
- Genus: Coryphoblennius; Norman, 1943
- Species: C. galerita

Binomial name
- Coryphoblennius galerita (Linnaeus, 1758)

Synonyms
- Blennius galerita Linnaeus, 1758; Lioblennius galerita (Linnaeus, 1758); Blennius coquillad Lacépède, 1800; Blennius montagui Fleming, 1828; Blennius artedii Valenciennes, 1836; Salarias simplocos Hilgendorf, 1888

= Montagu's blenny =

Species of fish

Montagu's blenny (Coryphoblennius galerita), also known as the capuchin blenny, is a species of combtooth blenny found in the intertidal zones of the eastern Atlantic ocean from England to Madeira and the Canary Islands as well the Mediterranean Sea, the Black Sea and the Sea of Marmara. This species prefers rocky shores with much wave action. This species grows to a length of 7.6 centimetres (3.0 in) SL. It is the only species in the genus Coryphoblennius.

== Description ==
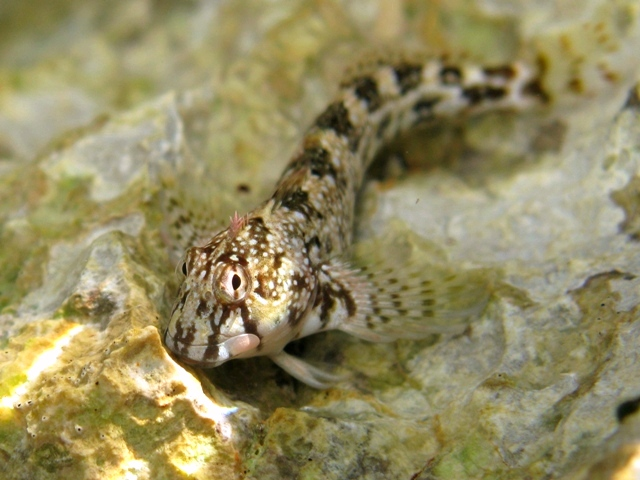
Coryphoblennius galerita Croatia

Montagu's blenny is small and has an elongated body which has no scales, its eyes are set on top of the head and its mouth points downwards. It attains a total length of 8.5 centimetres (3.3 in). The background colour is pale brown marked with olive-green vertical stripes and light blue spots. There is a single dorsal fin that runs along the total length of its body with an obvious notch part of the way along. There is fringed, fleshy crest situated between its eyes and, in at least in Britain and Ireland, this feature distinguishes Montagu's blenny from the other species present. The fleshy crest continues along the dorsal surface of the blenny as a series of short fleshy tentacles. It has large pectoral fins which are used to grip on to rock surfaces and resemble limbs. The fish in the Atlantic specimens often have dark-spots compared to Mediterranean populations. When spawning the males become uniformly dark or show a marbled pattern and have a white upper lip.

== Distribution ==
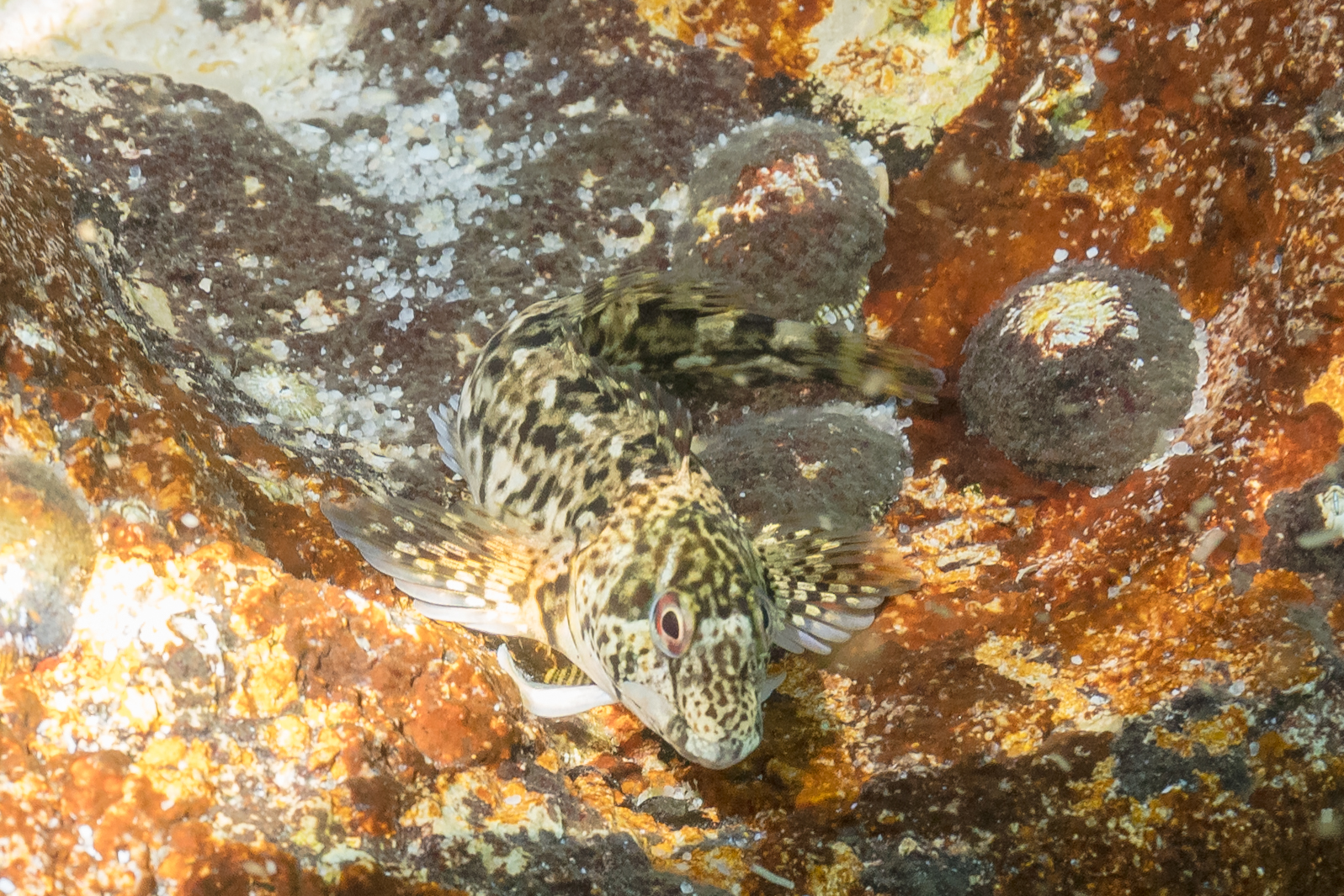
Coryphoblennius galerita in Setúbal, Portugal

Montagu's blenny occurs in the north eastern Atlantic Ocean and the Mediterranean. Its range in the Atlantic extends from southern Ireland and the southern coasts of Great Britain south to Portugal and along the west African coats as far as Guinea, It also occurs in the Macaronesian archipelagoes of Madeira, the Azores and the Canary Islands. It is found on all Mediterranean coastlines and into the Sea of Marmara, and the western Black Sea, it has been recorded from Black Sea coast of central Turkey and it may occur in the eastern Black Sea but this is unconfirmed.

== Habitat and ecology ==
Montagu's blenny is found around the mid-tide level of the intertidal zone in rocky coasts, often on steep rocky surfaces up to the surf zone. It shows a preference for rock pools which are not heavily vegetated with leafy seaweeds, being more frequently recorded in pools dominated by coralline algae. This species will stay out of the water at low tide sheltering under rocks and seaweeds, being capable of breathing air. The juveniles are frequently recorded from tidal pools and sometimes shelter in the empty shells of barnacles.

This species is omnivorous and the main food of Montagu's blennies are small invertebrates, including acorn barnacles, although algae are an important component of the adult blennies' diet. The algae being scraped off rock substrates. It is mainly active by day, especially at high tide, and at night it may sleep up to 40 centimetres (16 in) above the water's surface.

Breeding takes place in the summer in shallow, sometimes intertidal water, from May to August. The male's courtship display consists of rocking his head from side to side. The eggs are demersal and adhere to the substrate via an adhesive filament. The males guard territories which include depressions, crevices or the holes created by piddocks. The males guard egg masses laid by several different females, frequently releasing sperm during periodic quivers to fertilise eggs in the nest in a similar manner to other blennies and they fan the eggs as if aerating and cleaning them. The larvae are planktonic and are often recorded in shallow, coastal waters.

== Etymology ==
The generic name is derived from Greek and is a compound noun consisting of the word Koryfó rendered as Corypho meaning "top" and blennius, which means "blenny" and is derived from a Greek word for "mucus", referring to its scaleless body. The specific name, galerita means "a cape" or "a hood" and refers to the crest between the eyes. The common name, Montagu's blenny, honours the English naturalist George Montagu (1753–1815).
