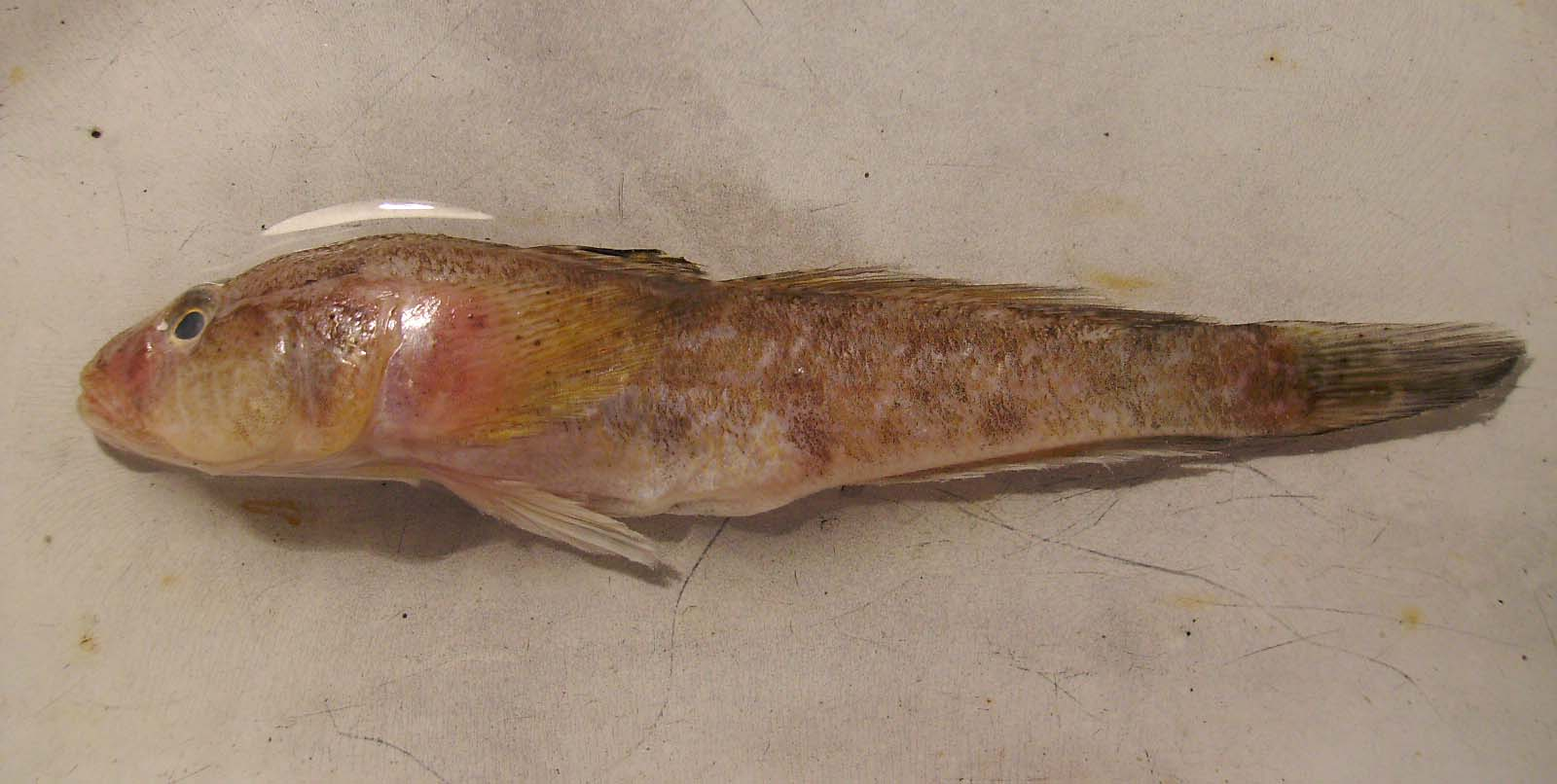
- Syrman goby from the Budaki Lagoon, SW Ukraine

Conservation status
- Least Concern (IUCN 3.1)

Scientific classification
- Kingdom: Animalia
- Phylum: Chordata
- Class: Actinopterygii
- Order: Gobiiformes
- Family: Gobiidae
- Genus: Ponticola
- Species: P. syrman

Binomial name
- Ponticola syrman (Nordmann, 1840)

Synonyms
- Gobius syrman Nordmann, 1840; Neogobius syrman (Nordmann, 1840); Gobius trautvetteri Kessler, 1859; Gobius eurystomus Kessler, 1877; Neogobius syrman eurystomus (Kessler, 1877); Gobius hybridus Iljin, 1956

= Syrman goby =

Species of fish

The Syrman goby (Ponticola syrman) is a species of goby native to marine, brackish and probably fresh waters of the Black Sea, the Sea of Azov and the Caspian Sea basins. They inhabit inshore waters with substrates composed of shell fragments, sand, mud or muddy sand. This species can reach a length of 24.5 centimetres (9.6 in) TL.

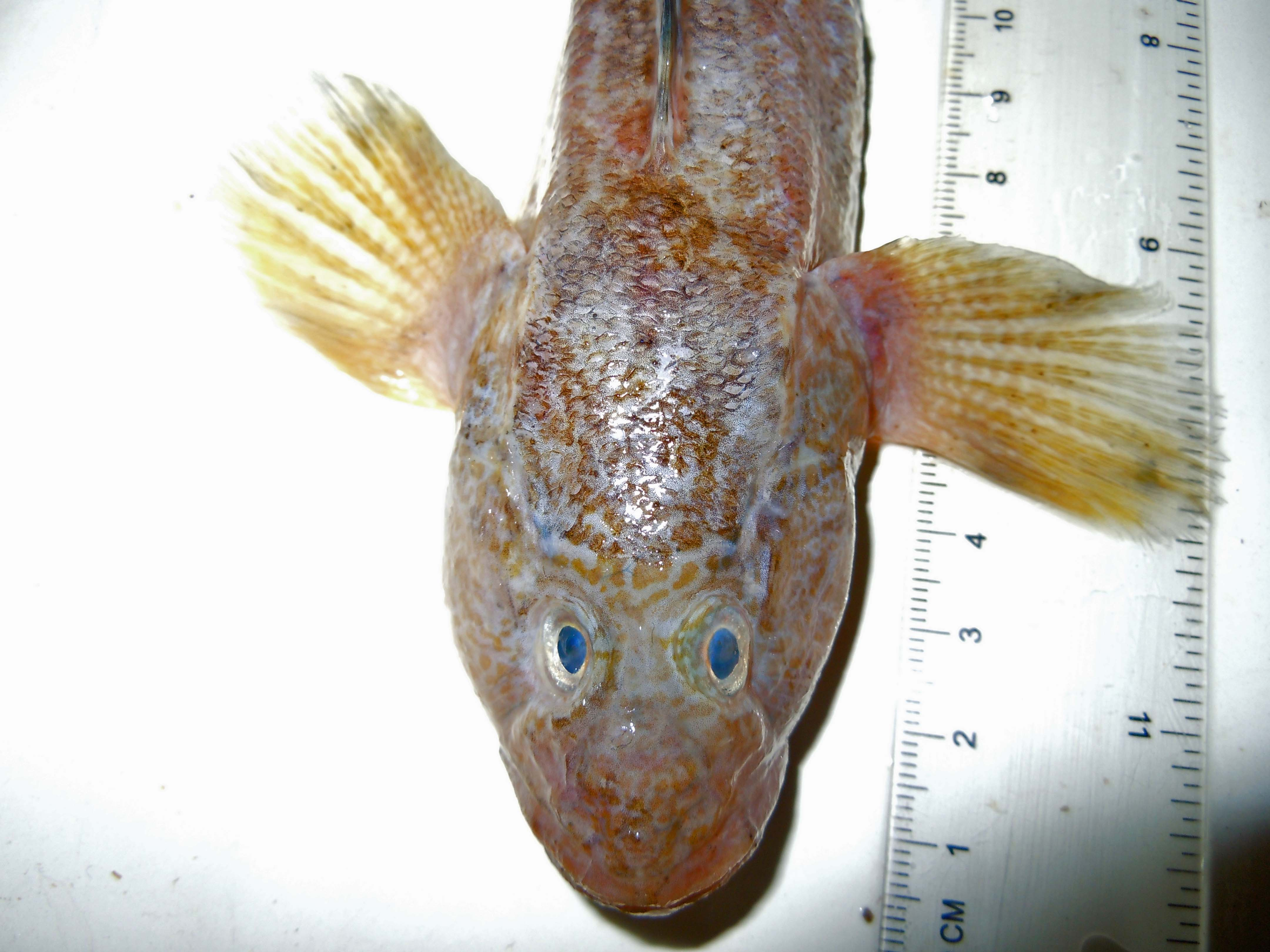
The head of the Syrman goby
