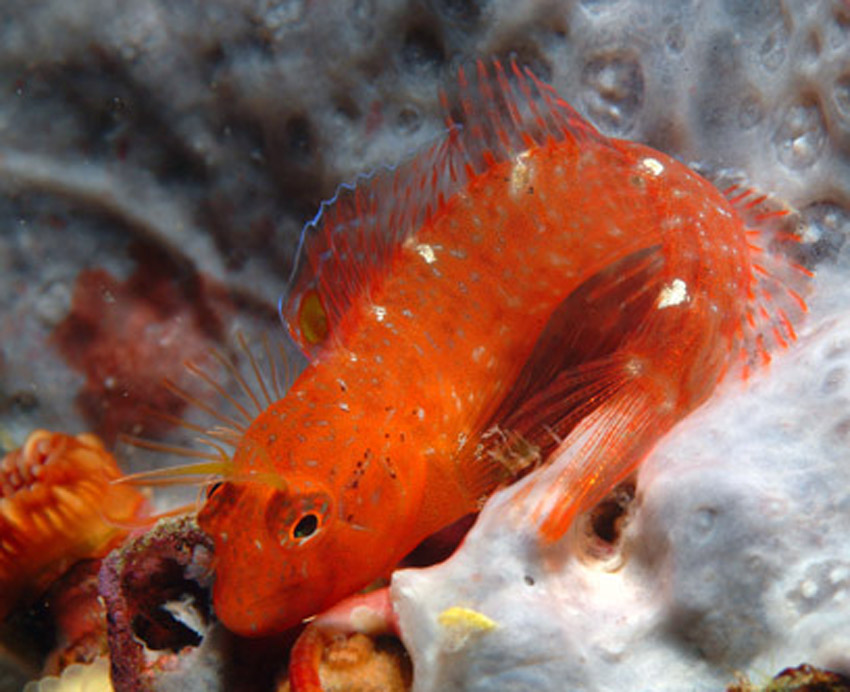

Conservation status
- Least Concern (IUCN 3.1)

Scientific classification
- Kingdom: Animalia
- Phylum: Chordata
- Class: Actinopterygii
- Division: Teleostei
- Order: Blenniiformes
- Family: Blenniidae
- Genus: Parablennius
- Species: P. zvonimiri

Binomial name
- Parablennius zvonimiri (Kolombatović, 1892)

Synonyms
- Blennius zvonimiri Kolombatovic, 1892

= Zvonimir's blenny =

Species of fish

Zvonimir's blenny (Parablennius zvonimiri) is a species of combtooth blenny found in the Mediterranean and Black Seas. This species reaches a length of 7 centimetres (2.8 in) TL. The identity of the person honoured by this species' specific name is uncertain but, it is thought to be a reference to the Medieval King of Croatia and Dalmatia Demetrius Zvonimir who reigned from 1075 to 1089. This allusion was probably made as a homage to the area where the type was collected.

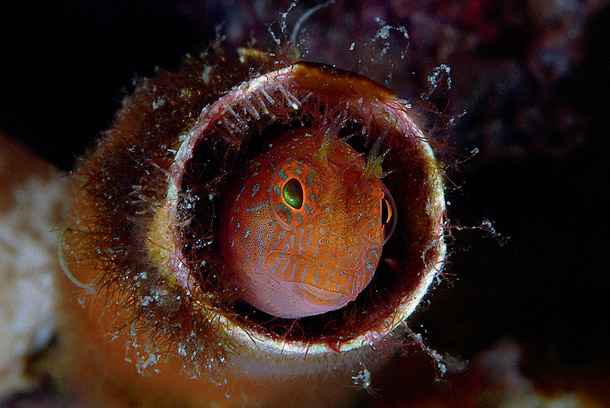
Zvonimir's blenny
