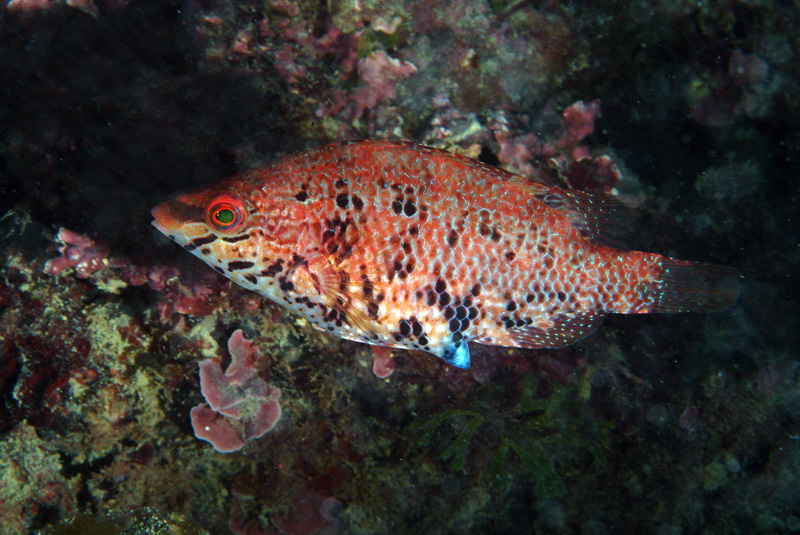

Conservation status
- Least Concern (IUCN 3.1)

Scientific classification
- Kingdom: Animalia
- Phylum: Chordata
- Class: Actinopterygii
- Division: Teleostei
- Order: Labriformes
- Family: Labridae
- Genus: Symphodus
- Species: S. roissali

Binomial name
- Symphodus roissali (A. Risso, 1810)

Synonyms
- Lutjanus roissali A. Risso, 1810; Crenilabrus roissali (A. Risso, 1810); Labrus oculusperdix Rafinesque, 1810; Lutjanus alberti A. Risso, 1810; Labrus aeruginosus Pallas, 1814; Crenilabrus aeruginosus (Pallas, 1814); Labrus capistratus Pallas, 1814; Crenilabrus capistratus (Pallas, 1814); Crenilabrus tigrinus A. Risso, 1827; Crenilabrus arcuatus A. Risso, 1827; Crenilabrus quinquemaculatus A. Risso, 1827; Symphodus quinquemaculatus (A. Risso, 1827)

= Five-spotted wrasse =

Species of fish

The five-spotted wrasse (Symphodus roissali) is a species of wrasse native to the eastern Atlantic Ocean from the Bay of Biscay to Morocco and through the coastal waters of the Mediterranean Sea and the Black Sea. This species inhabits rocky areas usually within beds of eelgrass at depths from 1 to 30 m (3.3 to 98.4 ft). It can reach 17 cm (6.7 in) in standard length, though usually not more than 12 cm (4.7 in). This species is sought by local peoples as a food fish and can also be found in the aquarium trade.
