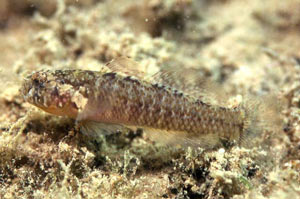

Conservation status
- Least Concern (IUCN 3.1)

Scientific classification
- Kingdom: Animalia
- Phylum: Chordata
- Class: Actinopterygii
- Order: Gobiiformes
- Family: Gobiidae
- Subfamily: Gobiinae
- Genus: Millerigobius; Bath, 1973
- Species: M. macrocephalus

Binomial name
- Millerigobius macrocephalus (Kolombatović, 1891)

Synonyms
- Gobius macrocephalus Kolombatović, 1891

= Large-headed goby =

Species of fish

The large-headed goby (Millerigobius macrocephalus) is a species of goby native to coastal waters of the Adriatic Sea, the Levant Sea, the western Mediterranean and the Aegean Sea where it occurs in lagoons and shallow inshore waters to about 4 metres (13 ft) in depth with stones to provide shelter. This species can reach a length of 4.3 centimetres (1.7 in) SL. It is currently the only known member of the genus Millerigobius.
