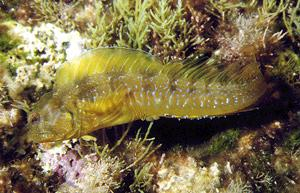

Conservation status
- Least Concern (IUCN 3.1)

Scientific classification
- Kingdom: Animalia
- Phylum: Chordata
- Class: Actinopterygii
- Order: Blenniiformes
- Family: Blenniidae
- Genus: Parablennius
- Species: P. incognitus

Binomial name
- Parablennius incognitus (Bath, 1968)

Synonyms
- Blennius incognitus Bath, 1968; Blennius ponticus incognitus Bath, 1968; Pictiblennius incognitus (Bath, 1968)

= Mystery blenny =

Species of fish

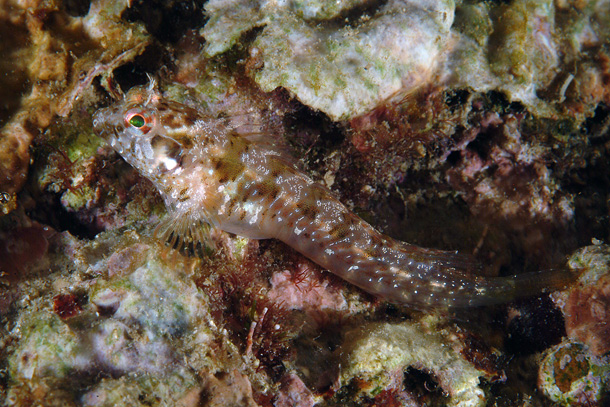
Parablennius incognitus

The mystery blenny (Parablennius incognitus) is a species of combtooth blenny found in the eastern Atlantic ocean and the Mediterranean Sea. It is widespread in Madeira, the Canary Islands and Limbe, Cameroon, off Iberian Peninsula to all parts of the Mediterranean including Morocco, the Sea of Marmara, and Black Sea. In the Black Sea it was first found in 2002 near the southern coast of Crimea, Ukraine, and soon become abundant in coastal waters from Sevastopol to Cape Fiolent. It can reach a length of 5.8 centimetres (2.3 in) SL.
