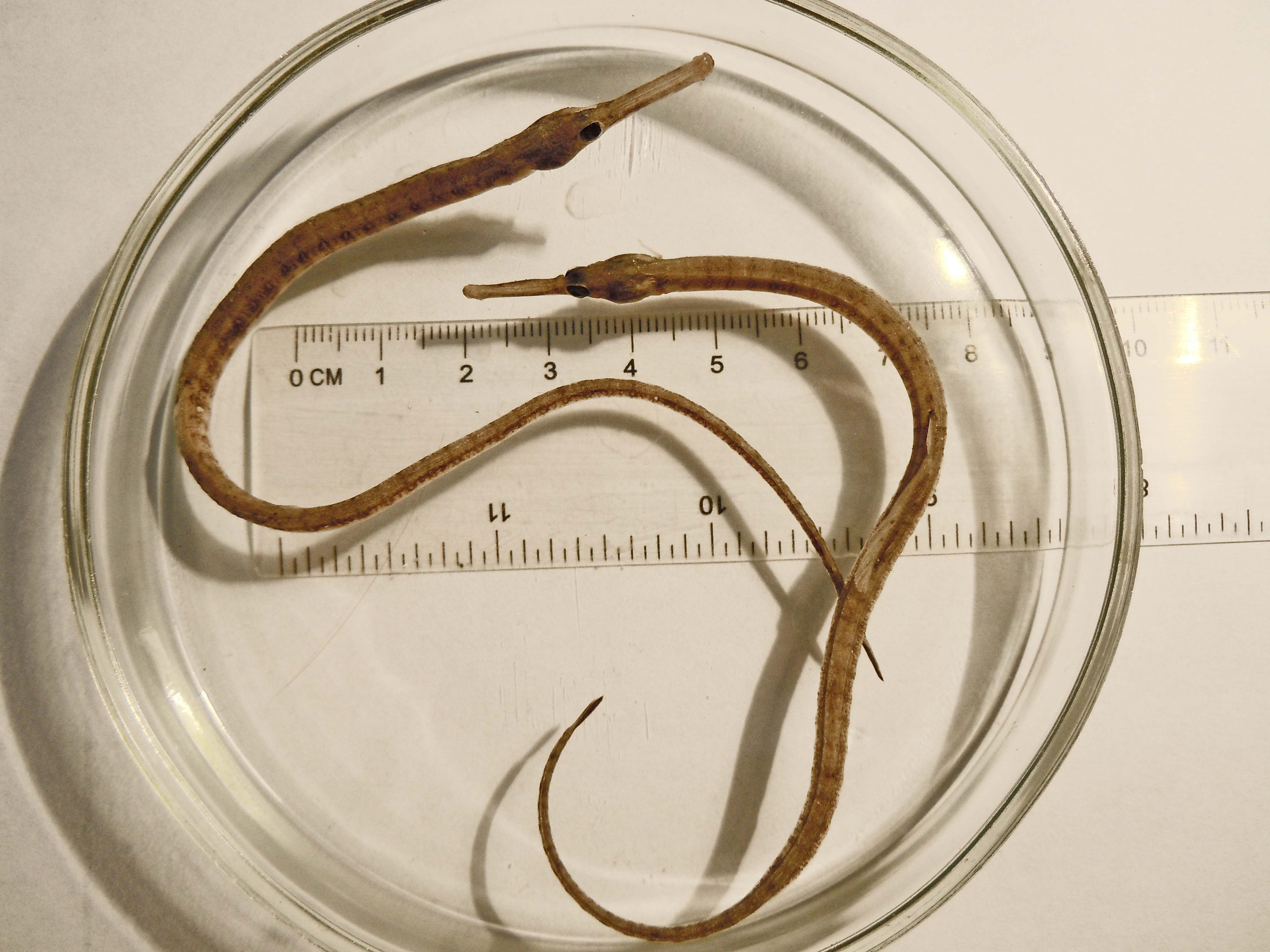

Conservation status
- Data Deficient (IUCN 3.1)

Scientific classification
- Domain: Eukaryota
- Kingdom: Animalia
- Phylum: Chordata
- Class: Actinopterygii
- Order: Syngnathiformes
- Family: Syngnathidae
- Genus: Syngnathus
- Species: S. tenuirostris

Binomial name
- Syngnathus tenuirostris Rathke, 1837

= Narrow-snouted pipefish =

Species of fish

Narrow-snouted pipefish (Syngnathus tenuirostris) is a pipefish species which inhabits the Mediterranean basin: Adriatic Sea, Tyrrhenian Sea, and Black Sea. It is a marine demersal fish with an ovoviviparous breeding pattern.
