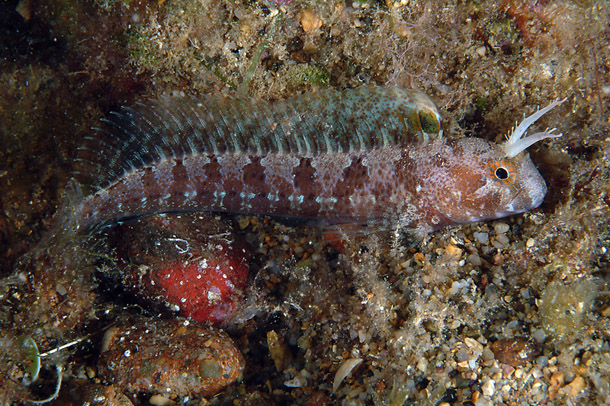

Conservation status
- Least Concern (IUCN 3.1)

Scientific classification
- Kingdom: Animalia
- Phylum: Chordata
- Class: Actinopterygii
- Order: Blenniiformes
- Family: Blenniidae
- Genus: Parablennius
- Species: P. tentacularis

Binomial name
- Parablennius tentacularis (Brünnich, 1768)

Synonyms
- Blennius tentacularis Brünnich, 1768

= Tentacled blenny =

Species of fish

The tentacled blenny (Parablennius tentacularis) is a species of combtooth blenny most commonly found in all parts of the Mediterranean Sea (except the eastern part), in the Sea of Marmara and the Black Sea, and the east Atlantic near the coast of Portugal, Spain, Canary Islands, and Morocco south to Guinea. This species reaches a length of 15 centimetres (5.9 in) TL. Found in brackish waters, in estuaries or deltas, this demersal fish can be found in the sand at the bottom of the water in light vegetation. The adult males guards a suitable spot, which a few females may visit and deposit their eggs, the males fertilizes the eggs and guards them until they hatch.
