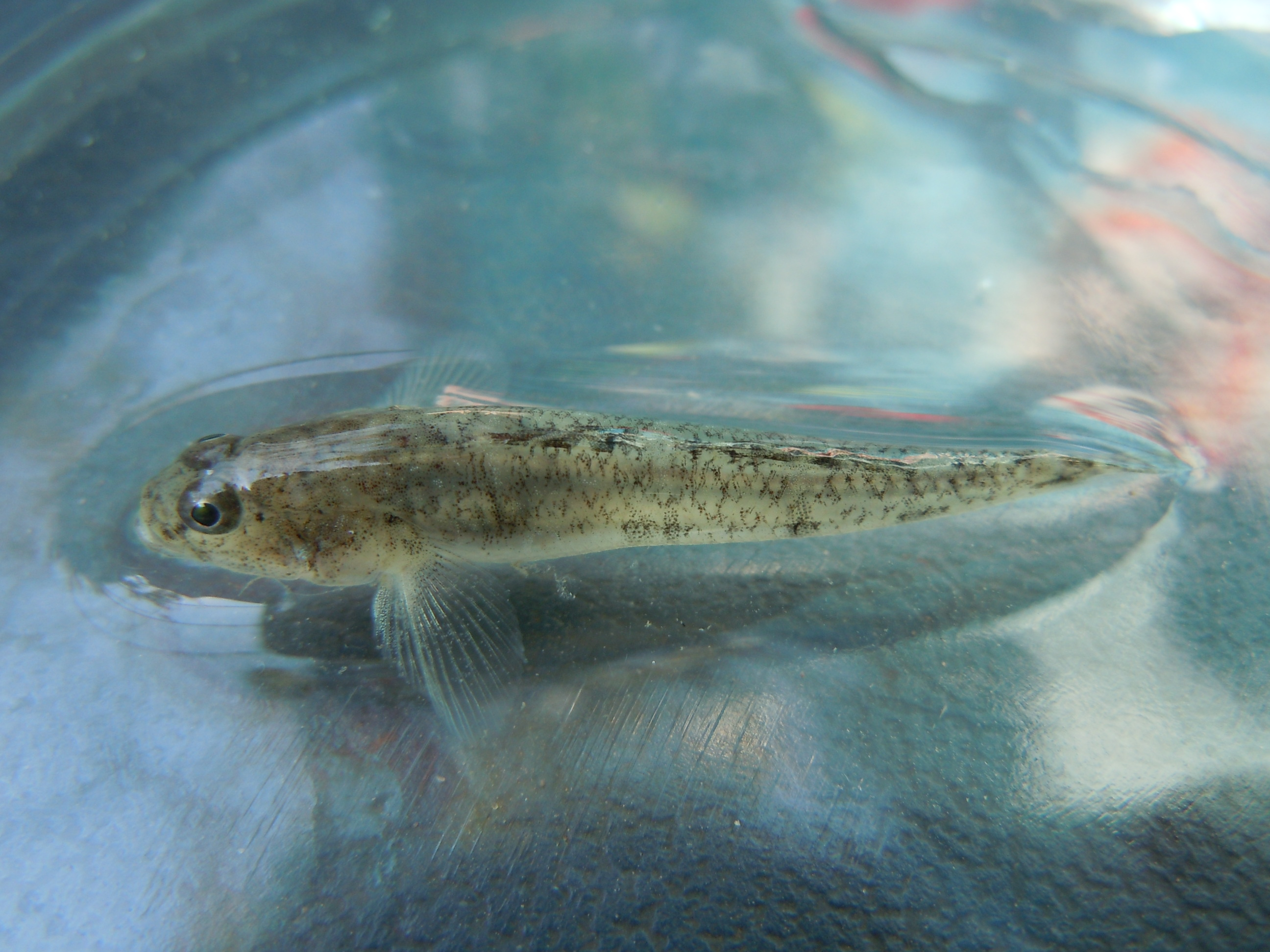
- The Longtail dwarf goby from the Dnieper Estuary, Ukraine

Conservation status
- Least Concern (IUCN 3.1)

Scientific classification
- Kingdom: Animalia
- Phylum: Chordata
- Class: Actinopterygii
- Division: Teleostei
- Order: Gobiiformes
- Family: Oxudercidae
- Genus: Knipowitschia
- Species: K. longecaudata

Binomial name
- Knipowitschia longecaudata (Kessler, 1877)

Synonyms
- Gobius longecaudatus Kessler, 1877; Pomatoschistus longecaudatus (Kessler, 1877); Pomatoschistus knipowitschi Beling, 1927; Knipowitschia georghievi Pinchuk, 1978

= Longtail dwarf goby =

Species of fish

The longtail dwarf goby (Knipowitschia longecaudata) is a species of goby native to the Black Sea, Sea of Azov, and the Caspian Sea where it is mostly found in areas of brackish water over sand or amongst weeds where it feeds on small invertebrates. This species can reach a length of 5 centimetres (2.0 in) TL.

The longtail dwarf goby is rare invasive goby species in the Volga River. Its invasion into the uppermost part of the undammed section of the Volga River near Volgograd, not far from the outlet of the Volga-Don Canal. It is possible that longtail dwarf goby could have invaded earlier, including pathways through irrigation canals as an invasion corridor. The Don River basin may be a likely source region for the Volga invasion of longtail dwarf gobies. Biological characteristics (early maturation, short life cycle, ecological plasticity) indicate a high probability of further range expansion for this species. Longtail dwarf gobies’ impact on local communities is minor, but, like other gobies, this species may serve as prey for piscivorous species.
