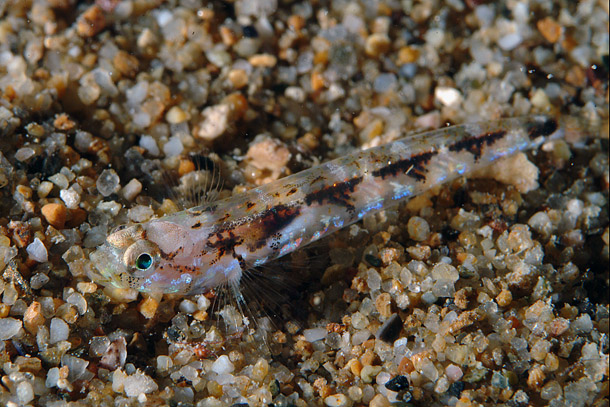

Conservation status
- Least Concern (IUCN 3.1)

Scientific classification
- Domain: Eukaryota
- Kingdom: Animalia
- Phylum: Chordata
- Class: Actinopterygii
- Order: Gobiiformes
- Family: Gobiidae
- Genus: Pomatoschistus
- Species: P. bathi

Binomial name
- Pomatoschistus bathi P. J. Miller, 1982

= Bath's goby =

Species of fish

Pomatoschistus bathi is a species of goby native to the eastern Mediterranean and the Sea of Marmara where it occurs at depths of from 7 to 14 metres (23 to 46 ft) on substrates with a sand or mud component. This species can reach a length of 3 centimetres (1.2 in) TL. It is found in Mediterranean Sea and Black Sea, with scattered records in southwestern France to Turkish Aegean Sea coast. The Bath's goby feeds on bosmiden, brine shrimps, lobster eggs, oyster eggs, zoobenthos and zooplankton. In 2013, it was listed as data deficient but was changed to Least Concern the following year because the population is thought to stable, it may be under-represented and there are no known threats. The specific name honours the German ichthyologist Hans Walter Bath (1924–2015).
