= Boccadasse =

Boccadasse Bocca d'Âze / Boccadâze (Ligurian)
- Neighbourhood
- Location in northern Italy
- Coordinates: 44°23′24″N 8°58′29″E
- Country: Italy
- Region: Liguria
- Metropolitan city: Genoa
- Comune: Genoa
- Quartiere: Albaro

Area
  - Total: 5 km^{2} (1.9 sq mi)

Population
  - Total: 5,000
- Postal code: 16146
- Area code: 010

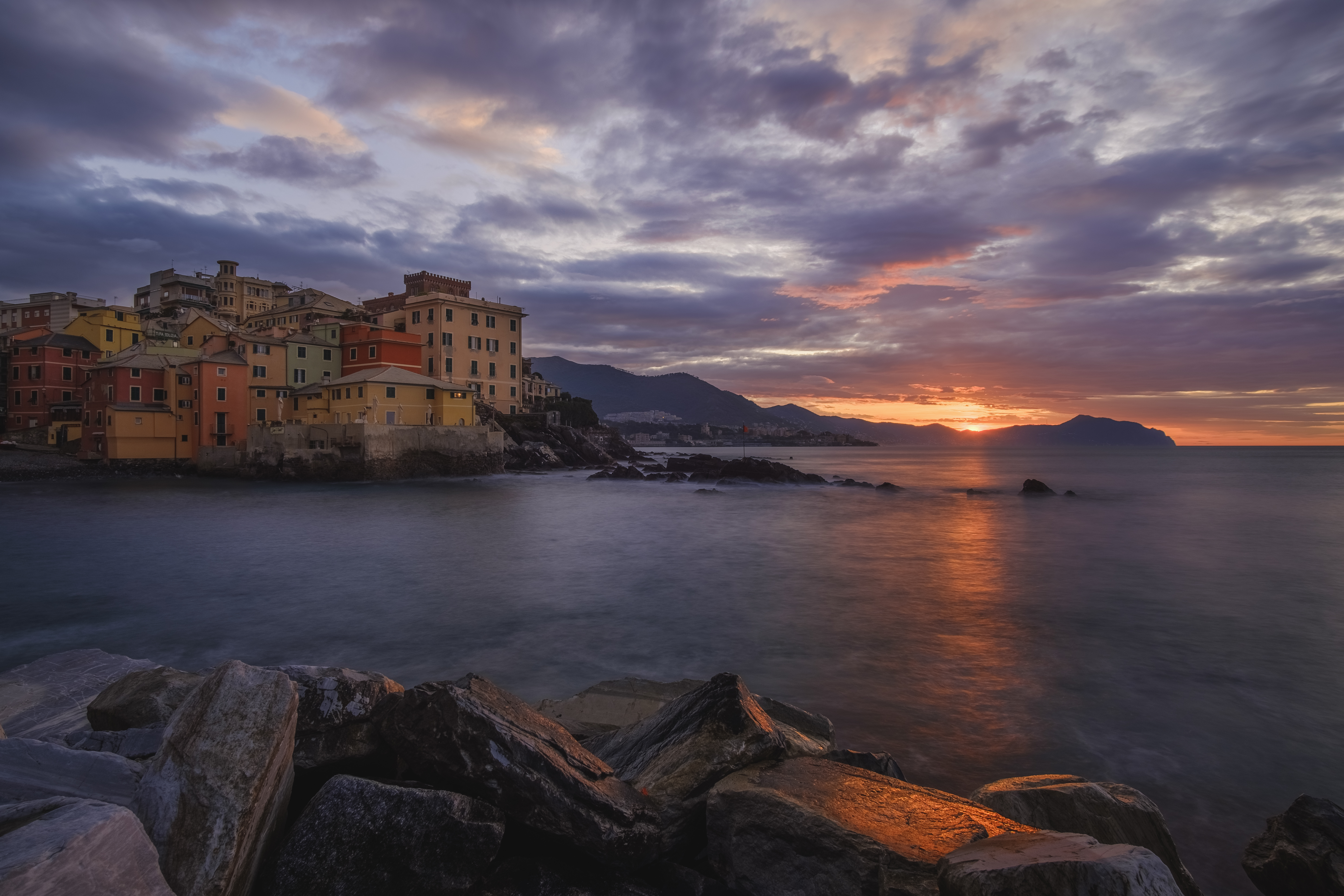
Boccadasse and Portofino's Promontory at sunrise

Boccadasse (Genoese: Bocca d'Âze or Boccadâze) is an old mariners' village of the Italian city of Genoa. It lies within the borders of the neighbourhood of Albaro. In today's administrative subdivision it is located in the Municipio VIII - Medio Levante area which includes the neighbourhoods of Albaro, Foce and San Martino. Boccadasse is bordered on the west side by Via Felice Cavallotti, by Via Caprera on the northern side and by Via Capo di Santa Chiara on the eastern side. Naturally, it is delimited by the sea to the south.

== Description of the neighbourhood ==
The ancient village of Boccadasse lies at the eastern end of the main promenade of the city of Genoa, Corso Italia. The village of Boccadasse, with its pastel coloured houses around its cobblestone beach, preserved itself and remained unchanged making it a well-known tourist location of the city. Tourists are attracted to the neighbourhood also because, other than being a tourist location, it is inhabited by a living and active community where still some fishermen continue doing their traditional job. Today, next to the bay there are ice cream shops, restaurants, bakeries, bars and art galleries.

Boccadasse is also characterised by its church named after Saint Anthony of Padua. The church faces on the east side Corso Italia and on the west side the panoramic square dedicated to the Genoese poet Edoardo Firpo. From the square it is possible to see the typical view of the village with in the background the eastern side of the Metropolitan City of Genoa and the Promontory of Portofino.

From the square, the accesses to the bay are two: a stairway and Via Aurora, a typical Ligurian narrow street (Ligurian: crêuza). From the bay, several other narrow streets are found. One of them goes up to Capo Santa Chiara and continues down to the old village of Vernazzola, part of the Sturla neighbourhood. From Capo Santa Chiara, dominated by the Türcke Castle, there is a wide view of the Paradise Gulf and of Portofino.

=== Villas and castles ===
- Türcke Castle: Medieval style castle, merlato alla guelfa, designed by the Italian architect Gino Coppedé in 1903. The castle was built in florentine style (1400), in fact it has similarities with Palazzo Vecchio in Florence, Italy. It is located in Via a Capo Santa Chiara and it is accessed by a drawbridge.
- Villa Montebruno: Villa owned by several families among which the Caviglia, the Perosio (who restored it) and the Leupold, German Council Members. It is located in front of the square of Capo Santa Chiara.

=== Peculiarities ===
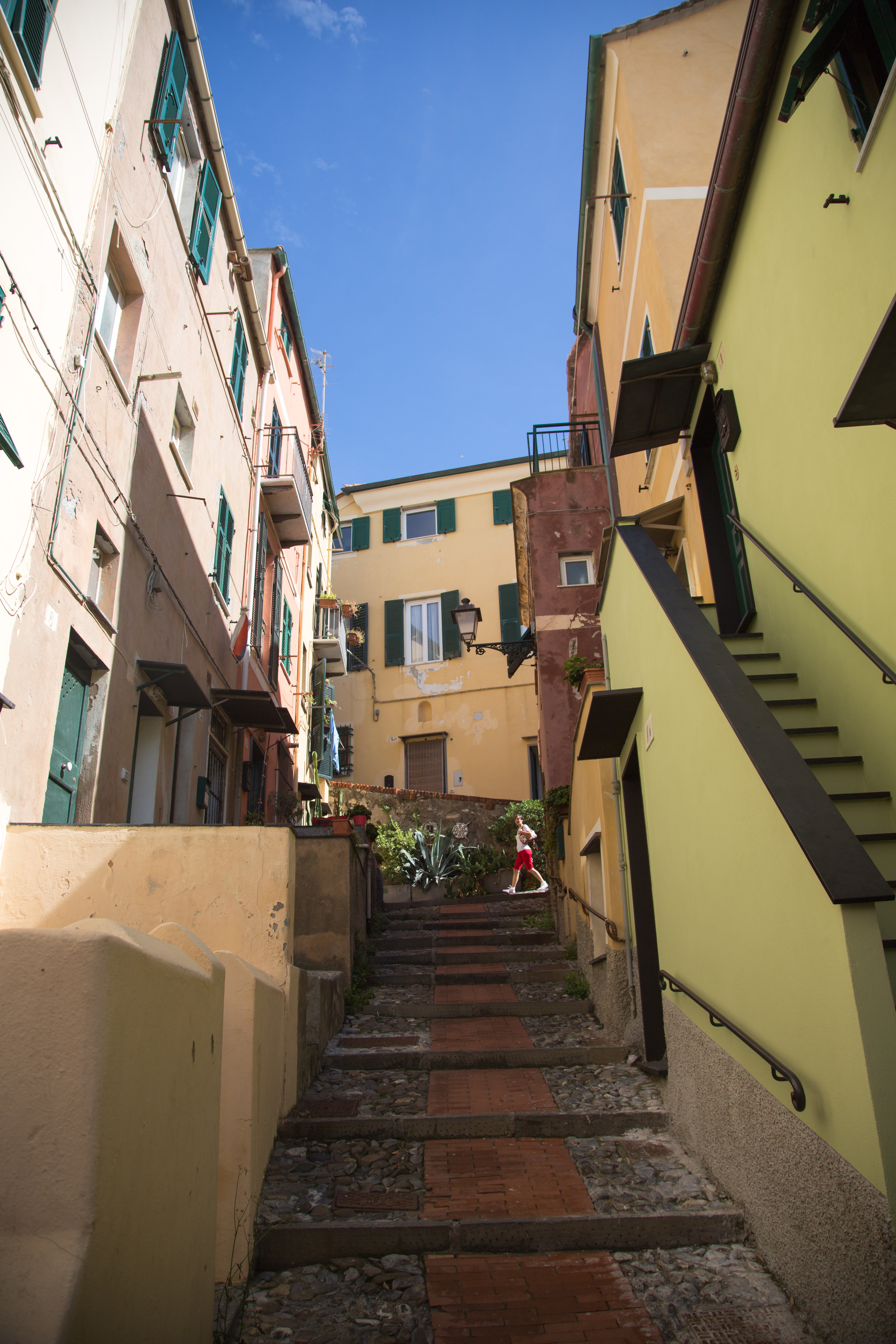
One of the typical Genoese "Crêuza" in Boccadasse

The bay is also characterised by a Genoa flag on a rock in the bay. The city of Genoa hosts two main football teams, Genoa and Sampdoria. Genoa, the oldest team in Italian history, is deeply connected to thee old mariners' village and the flag shows this connection. Since the 1970s the Genoa Club Patiti Rossoblù of Boccadasse instituted a prize named "Scoglio d'Oro". The prize was given by all the fan clubs to the best player of that year's team. The day of the ceremony, done in Boccadasse, plenty of Genoa flags were displayed.

== Origin of the name ==
Even though the origin of the name is uncertain, several are the hypothesis upon its origin. According to one of the more reliable hypothesis the name comes from the form of the bay on which Boccadasse lies, thus the name should be the univerbation of the Genoese for "donkey's mouth", bócca d'âze. Another theory states that the name derives from the creek which used to flow (where now lies Via Boccadasse) through the village, the Asse, therefore the name should mean "outlet of the Asse". Another popular theory is that the etymology of the name derives from Guglielmo Boccadassino, one of the main Medieval owners of buildings in the area.

== History ==
According to an old legend, the village was founded around the year 1000 by Spaniard fishermen who, in the middle of a storm, took shelter in the bay. From the name of the captain (De Odero or Donderos), would have derived the Italian surname Dodero, still today common in the area.

The village of Boccadasse, now part of the neighbourhood of Albaro, in the past was within the territory managed by San Francesco d'Albaro from which depended on administratively. Until the 19th century, San Francesco d'Albaro was rural municipality and Boccadasse was one of its periferic attachment, characterised by its outlet onto the sea.

With the Regio Decreto n. 1638, on 26 October 1873, Boccadasse became part of the aggregation forming the municipality of Genoa along with the now neighbourhoods of San Martino d'Albaro, Foce, Marassi, Staglieno and San Fruttuoso.

The building expansion of the 20th century changed the look of the area around the bay, making it a residential neighbourhood, but, thanks to its periferic location, it conserved its original urban structure.

It is also thought that Boccadasse is connected to the city of Buenos Aires, Argentina where, many Genoese emigrants moved to since the 1830s, setting in La Boca. In 1882, the inhabitants of the barrio of La Boca, proclaimed themselves part of Repùblica de la Boca raising the Genoese flag and formed an independent territory within Argentina, before being defeated by general Julio Argentino Roca. The name of the Argentinian barrio recalls one of the Genoese villages but there are no certain sources about the subject.

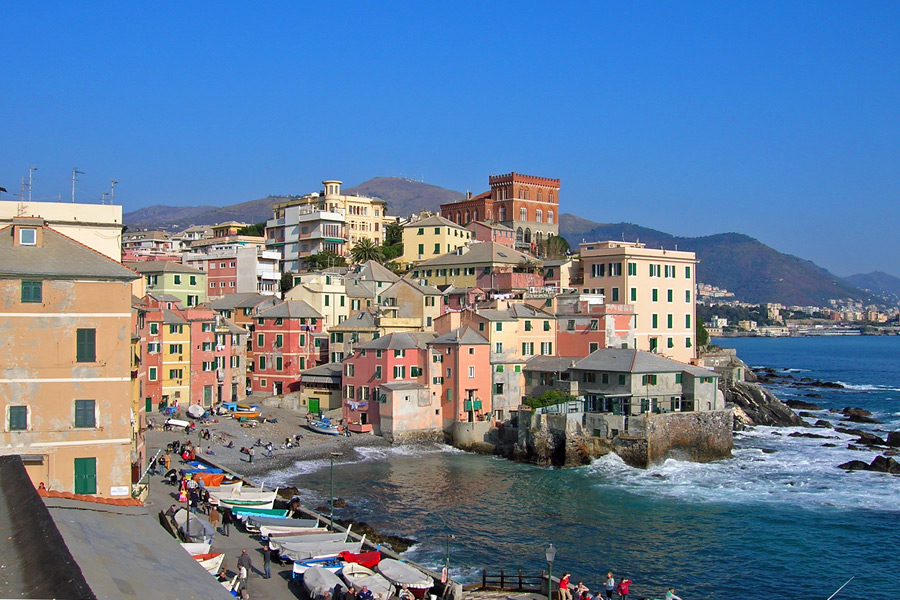
Boccadasse

== Culture ==
=== Music ===
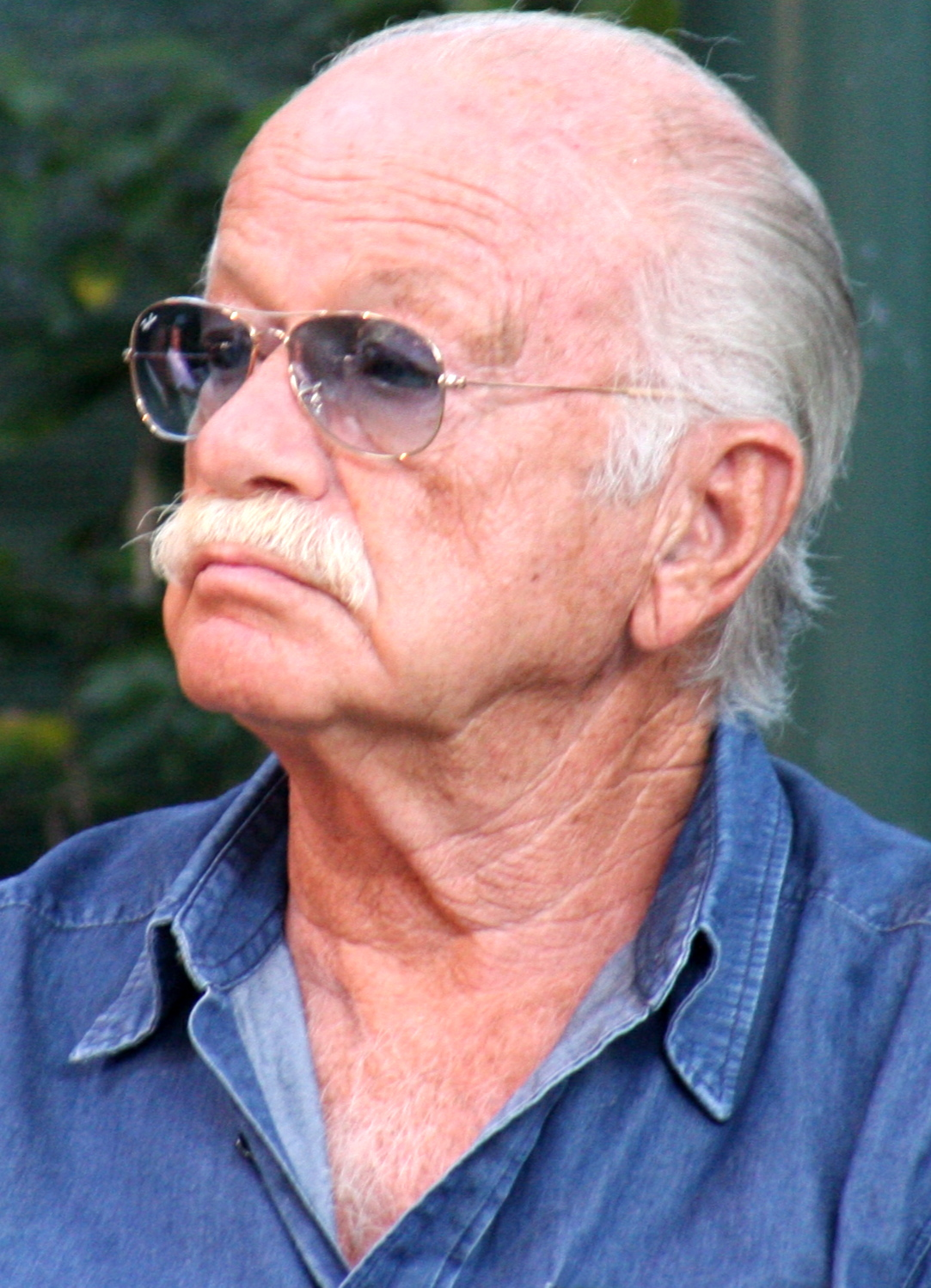
Gino Paoli

The Italian songwriter Gino Paoli who lived in Boccadasse, in Salita Santa Chiara, remembered the old village in the song "La Gatta" (without explicitly mentioning the name). He also wrote and sang an anonymous song (named, indeed, Boccadasse) which is part of the 2004 album Ti ricordi? No non mi ricordo made with Ornella Vanoni.

=== Literature ===
The Italian poet Edoardo Firpo dedicated to Boccadasse a poem, named Boccadâze, in which he described the atmosphere of the village. The first few verses are written on a commemorative plaque put up on the western wall of Saint Anthony's Church in the panoramic square dedicated to the poet.

The Sicilian writer Andrea Camilleri, in his crime novels on Commissario Montalbano, imagined that Livia Burlando (the protagonist's girlfriend) lived in Boccadasse.

=== UNESCO World Heritage Sites ===
In 2016, Pro Loco Boccadasse officially applied to enter the UNESCO list of Heritage Sites but the candidacy was turned down. In 2018, the city council officially reapplied.

== Natural areas ==
In the area near Boccadasse there is a preserved Site of Community Importance, suggested by Natura 2000 for its natural and geological importance. The site is located on the sea bottom of Sturla, Quarto dei Mille, Quinto al Mare and Nervi, where a characteristic habitat formed by meadows of the seagrass posidonia oceanica and reef formation. Among the animal species, there are mostly fish: Hippocampus hippocampus, Labrus merula, Parablennius gattorugine, Parablennius tentacularis, Symphodus cinereus, Symphodus rostratus, Symphodus tinca.

== Infrastructures and transports ==
=== Railways ===
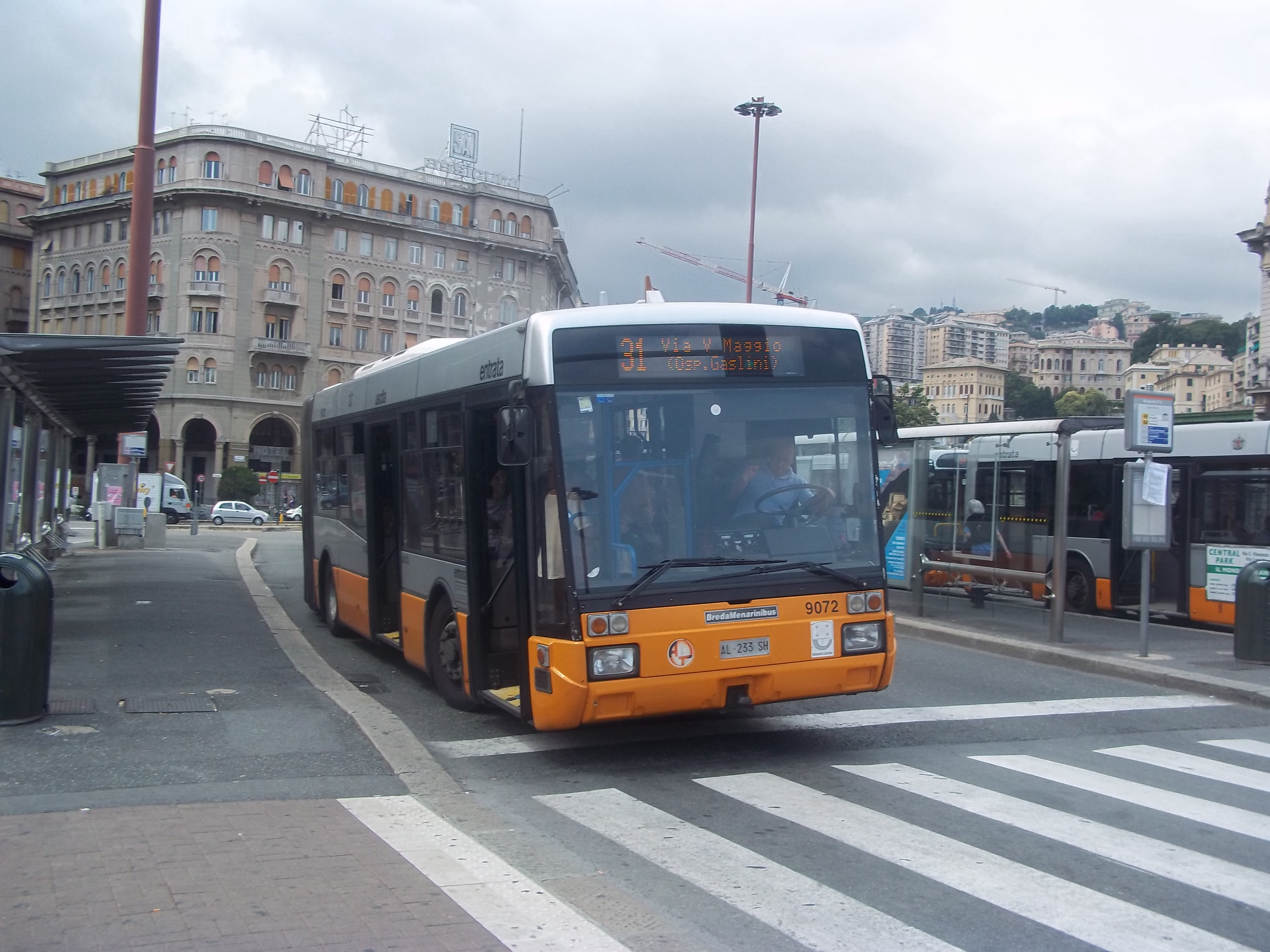
Bus n°31 (Brignole Railway Station to Gaslini Hospital)

Boccadasse is located 1.5 km (0.9 mi) from Genova Sturla railway station, 2.5 km (1.6 mi) from Genova Quarto ai Mille railway station and 3.5 km (2.2 mi) from Genova Brignole railway station.

=== Public transports ===
The location is reachable through two main bus lines:

- Bus no 31 (and 31/) Genova Brignole to Gaslini Hospital
- Bus no 42 Piazza Dante to Piazza Ragazzi del '99

=== Highways ===
The nearest highway exit is Nervi, on the autostrada A12, 5 km (3.1 mi) away from Boccadasse.

== Bibliography ==
- Corinna Praga, Genova fuori le mura, Genova, Fratelli Frilli Editori, 2006, ISBN 88-7563-197-2
- Camillo Tomei, Boccadasse Antico e Novo, Genova, Tipografia della Gioventù, 1910.
- Ignacio Weiss, Gauchos Gesuiti Genovesi, De Luca Editore, Roma, 1955.
- Guida d'Italia - Liguria, Milano, TCI, 2009.
