= Sturla =

Quarter of Genoa, Italy

Coordinates: 44.3937°N 8.9844°E

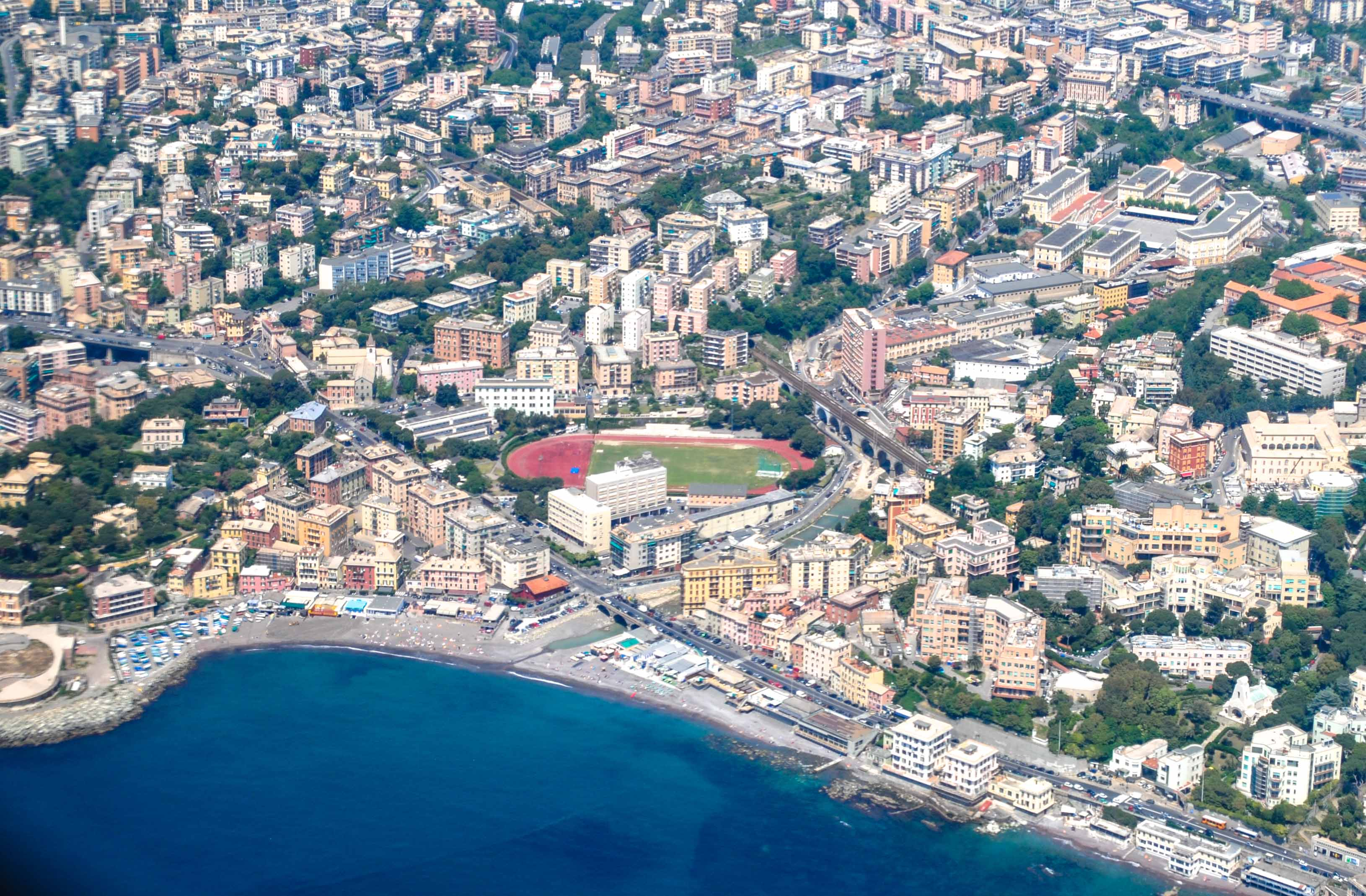
Aerial photo of Sturla.

Sturla (Italian: [ˈsturla], Ligurian: [ˈstyɾla]) is a quartiere of Genoa, Italy. It began life as an ancient fishing village which developed around a number of small coves – Sturla a Mare, at the mouth of the Sturla river, Vernazzola and Boccadasse (which is now included in the neighbouring quartiere of Albaro). Sturla is located in the Golfo di Sturla (Sturla Bay).

Sturla is part of the Medio Levante municipality, and has a population of 8278 inhabitants (as of December 31, 2010). In the 1800s the current quartiere was a commune of San Martino d'Albaro, while the village of Vernazzola was a commune of San Francesco d'Albaro. However, both communes were annexed by Genoa in 1874.

== Description of the quartiere ==
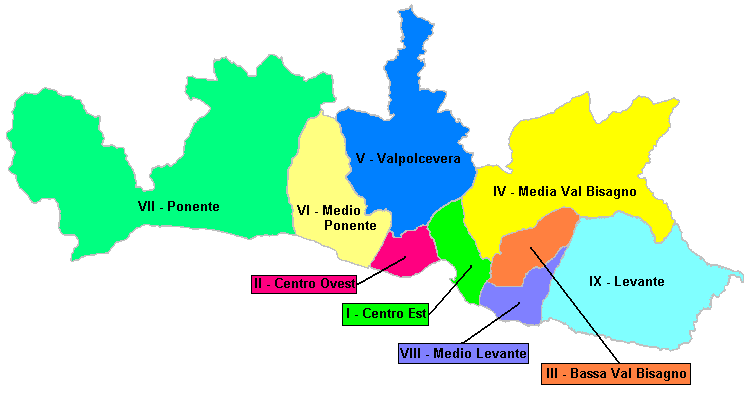
The Medio Levante municipality

The area of Sturla is marked out by Corso Europa, Via Orsini, the right bank of the Sturla river (from which it takes its name) and the sea. During the 20th century the neighborhood went through a period of extensive construction, but the centers of the original ancient villages are still recognizable. The neighbouring quarters are Albaro to the west, Borgoratti and San Martino to the north and Quarto dei Mille to the east.

The neighbourhood is home to the Villa Gentile athletics arena, as well as several public and private bathing facilities. A water purification plant has been built between Sturla beach and Vernazzola beach.

There are several schools in the district. There's a nursery school (Nini Corsanego) as well as a kindergarten (Bartolomeo Chighizola), both on the road leading from Piazza Sturla to Vernazzola beach. There's also a primary school dedicated to Ettore Vernazza, a middle school (Bernardo Strozzi) and the Martin Luther King high school that focuses on the sciences and was built in the 1960s.

The Genoese poet, Vico Faggi dedicated the following verse to Sturla:

Una luce, un riflesso. Quel barbaglio
ti fulmina, dal vetro, e tutto il borgo
si ridesta, s’arruffa. [...]

— by Vico Faggi, Sturla. Mattino

== The maritime villages of Sturla ==
In the area of Sturla, starting from the early Middle Ages, several maritime settlements arose due to the presence of useful landing places.

=== Boccadasse ===
Boccadasse is located immediately to the west of Capo di Santa Chiara. Although it's part of the district of Albaro it can be considered the last of the small fishing villages of the area of Sturla.

=== Vernazzola ===
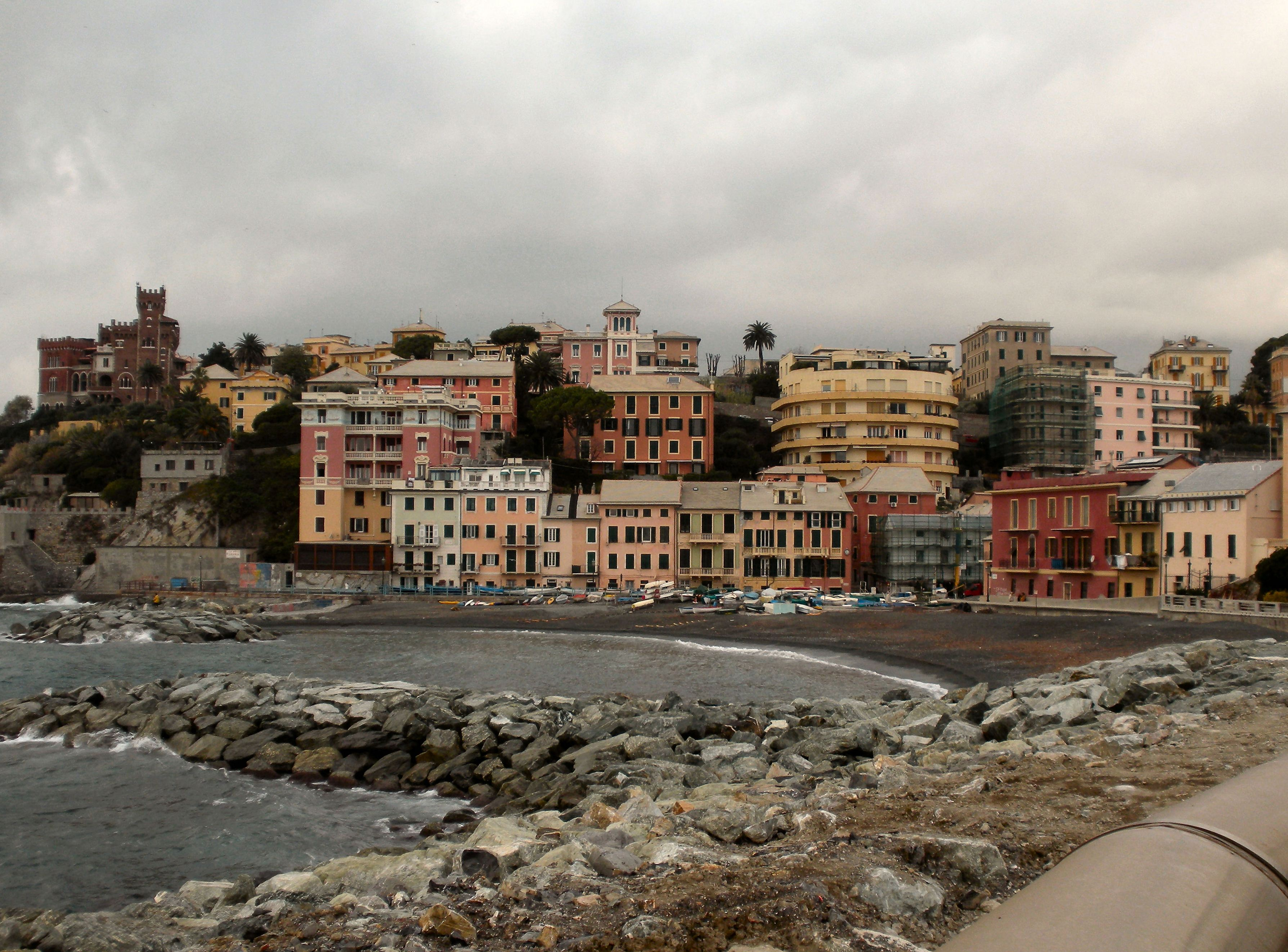
Genova Sturla Vernazzola

Vernazzola is a picturesque fishing village at the mouth of the Vernazza river located a short distance to the east of Boccadasse. The bay in which the village is located is hemmed in by two rocky outcrops named Grosso and Bernardina. The view extends to the east to the Portofino peninsular.

As well as being a fishing village, in the past Vernazzola was an important landing ground from where it was possible to climb the Sturla valley, on through the quartiere of Bavari and into the upper Bisagno valley. Immediately behind the houses on the shoreline there once stood a Dominican convent with an adjoining hospital for travellers. In time, behind the coastal buildings there gradually arose grand villas of the aristocratic families of Genoa, and finally, in the early twentieth century, luxurious Art Nouveau villas. However, like Boccadasse, the village still preserves its ancient dwellings, the network of old streets and an atmosphere of a bygone era.

Some of the streets around Vernazzola have characteristic names inspired by ancient classical mythology: Argonauti, Giasone, Icarus, Pelio, Urania. These names were chosen at the request of the last mayor of San Francesco d'Albaro, a passionate lover of the classical world, shortly before the annexation of the town to Genoa, in the second half of the 18th Century.

Along the road that leads around Capo di Santa Chiara, a distinctive vantage point dominated by the medieval styled Turcke castle, there are some eighteenth-century villas, the Augustinian convent and the church of Santa Chiara, founded in the sixteenth century.

=== Sturla a Mare ===
To the East of Vernazzola, separated by the small hill between the Vernazza river and the Sturla river, is the historic core of Sturla, a tiny fishing village, as evidenced by some of the place names, which winds around Via del Tritone, Via Tabarca, Via Zoagli, Vico del Pesce and Via del Bragone.

Today the village, partly reduced in size by the opening immediately upstream of an enlarged road (Via Dei Mille), consists of a few houses clustered around the ancient Oratorio di San Celso, the existence of which has been documented since 1311 although it was rebuilt in the Baroque period and then completely rebuilt in 2002.

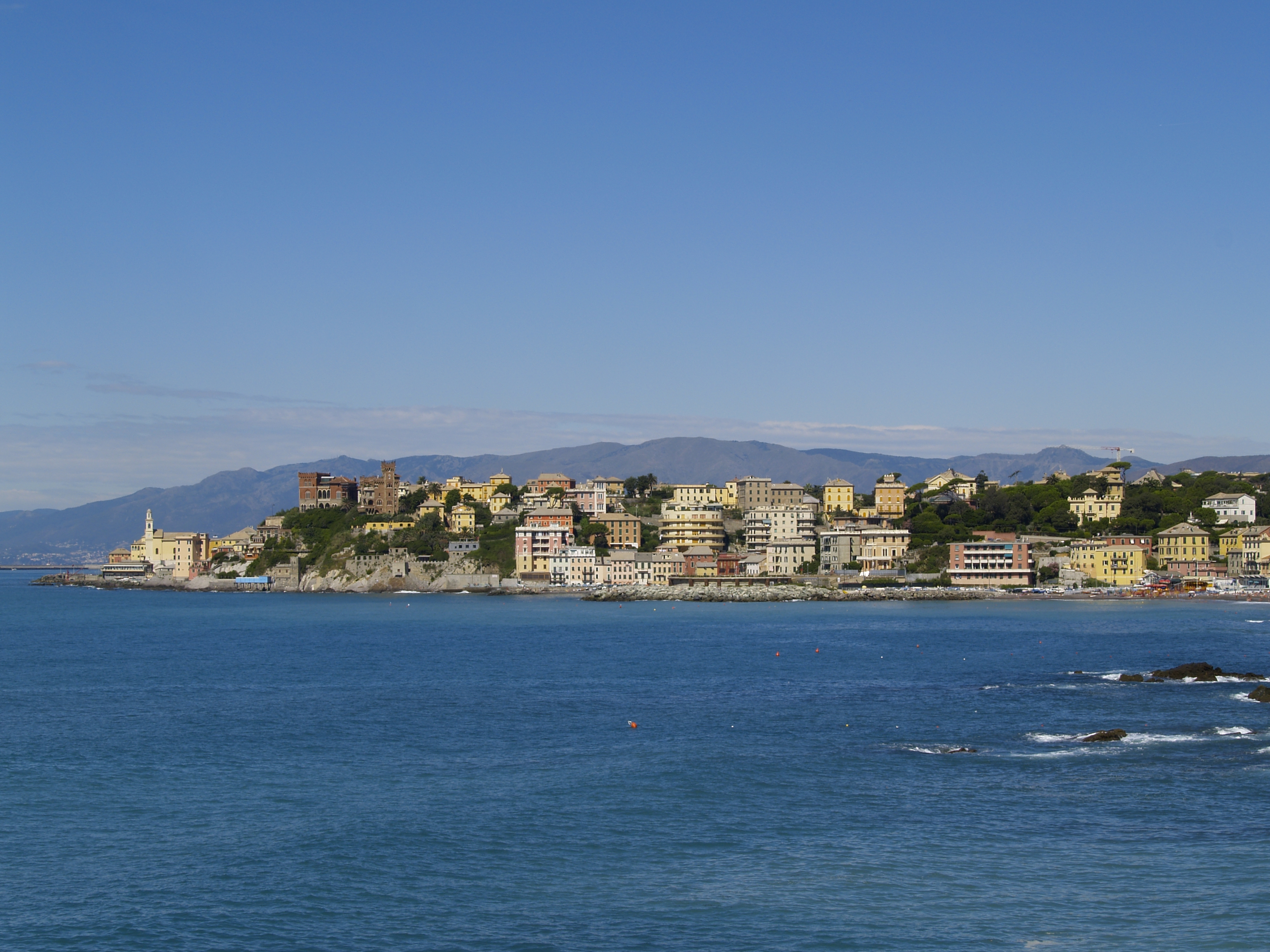
View of Boccadasse and Vernazzola

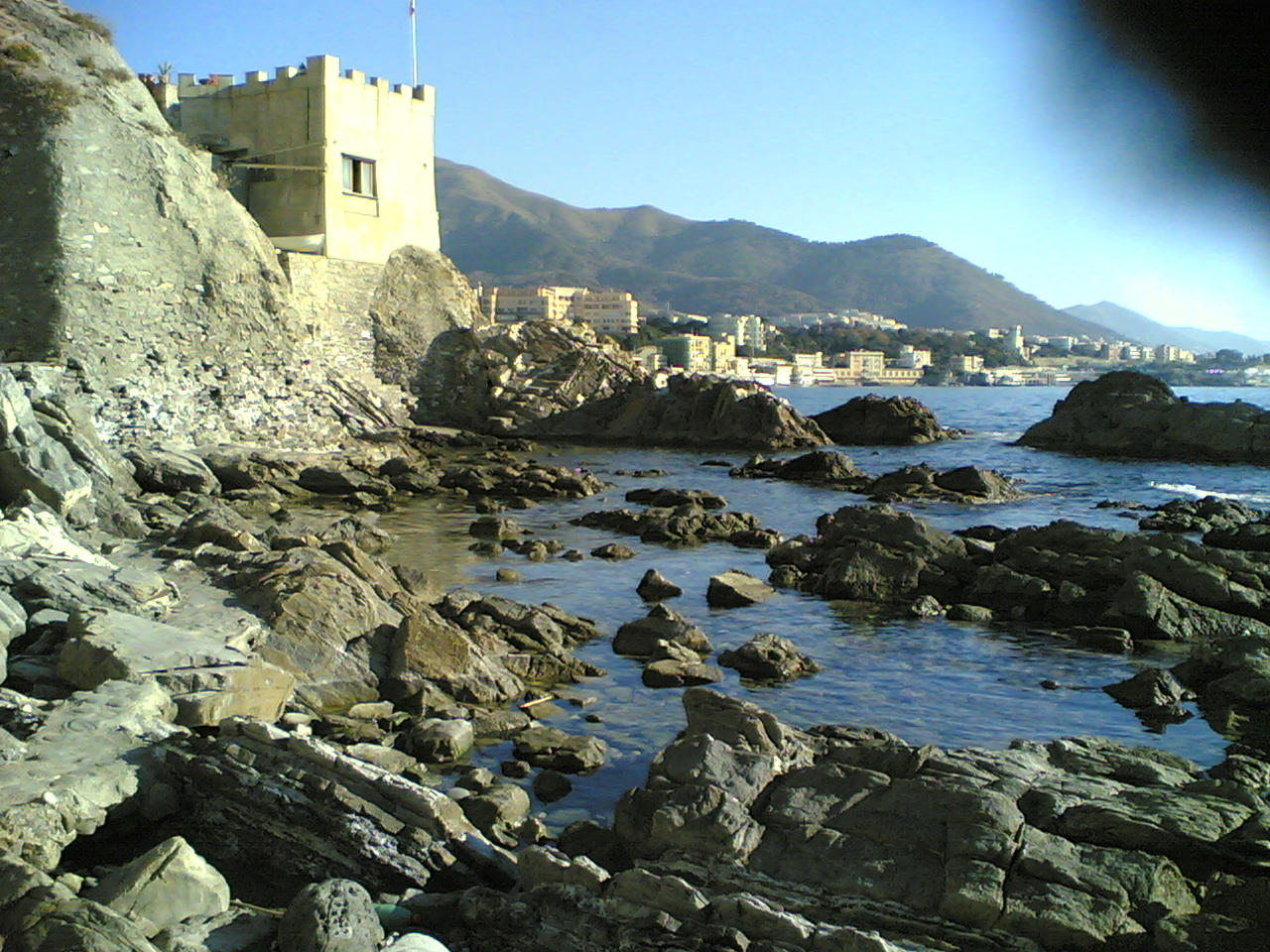
Capo Santa Chiara

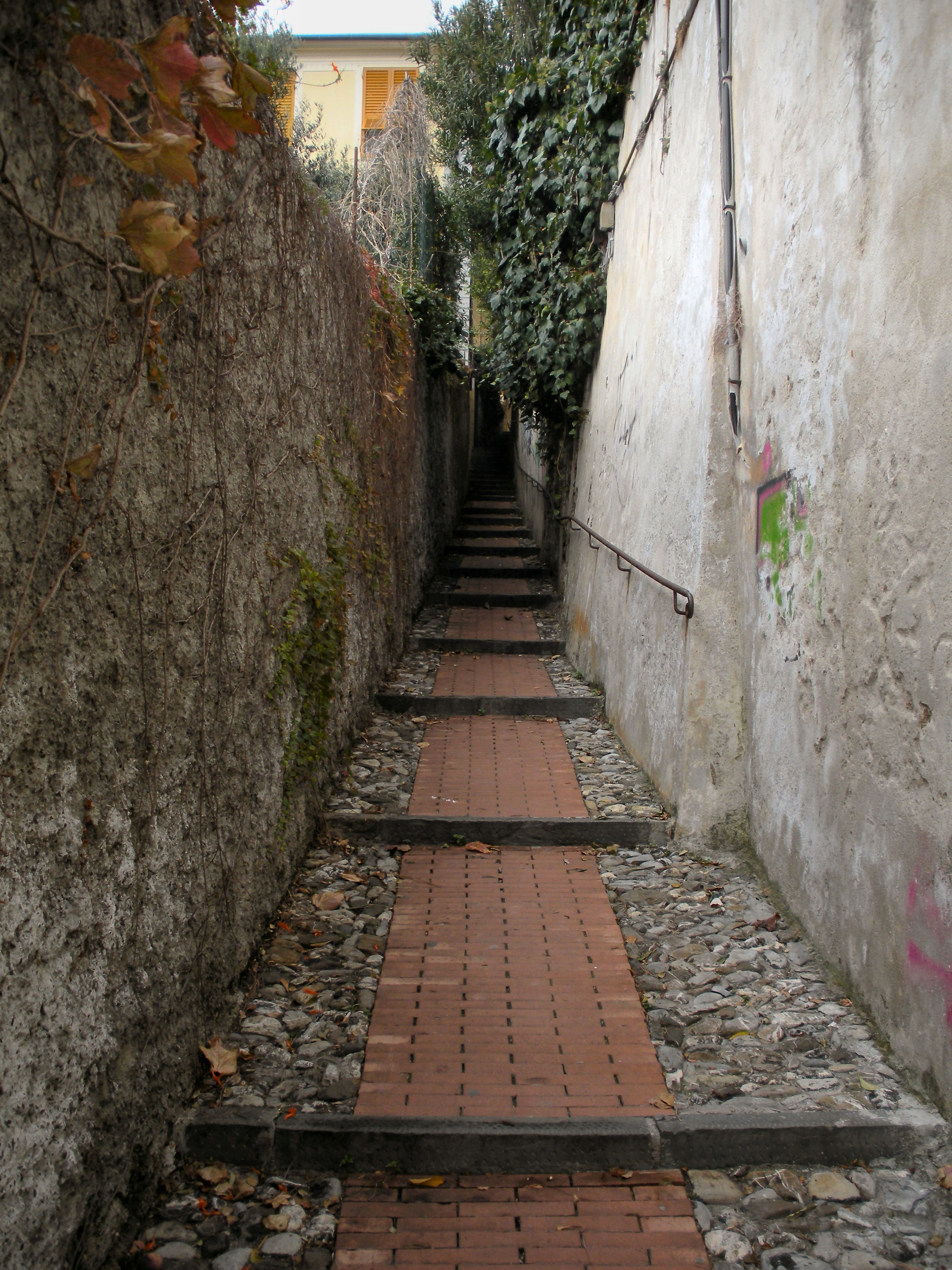
Via Urania

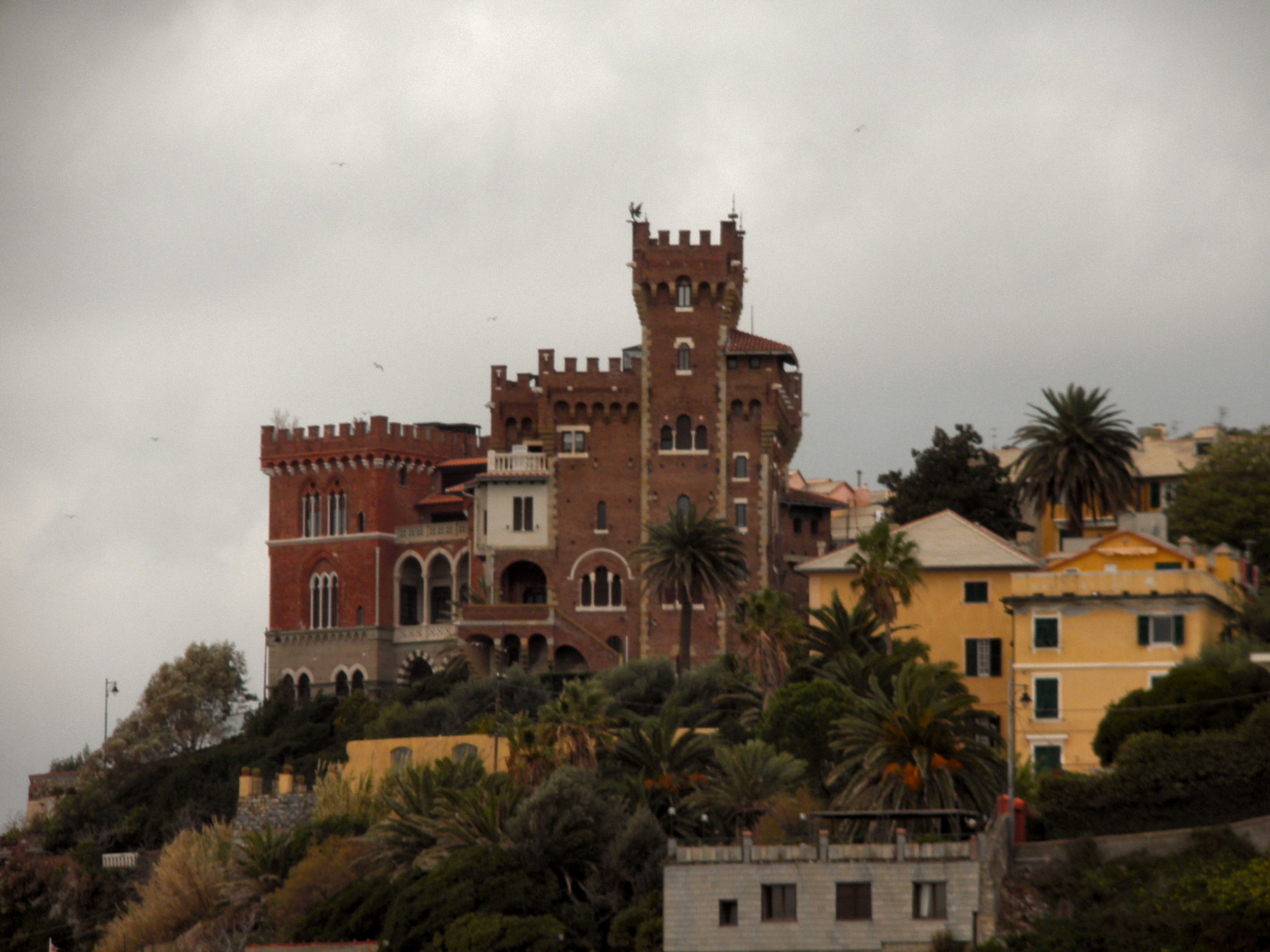
Castello Turcke

== Vernazza river ==
the Vernazza river, now completely channeled into tunnels, which flows from the area of the ancient Roman road, Via Aurelia, which is also known as Vernazza, in the district of San Martino, through the small valley containing the Martin Luther King high school, passes under Piazza Sturla and finally flows into the sea in an outlet in Vernazzola.

== Sturla river ==
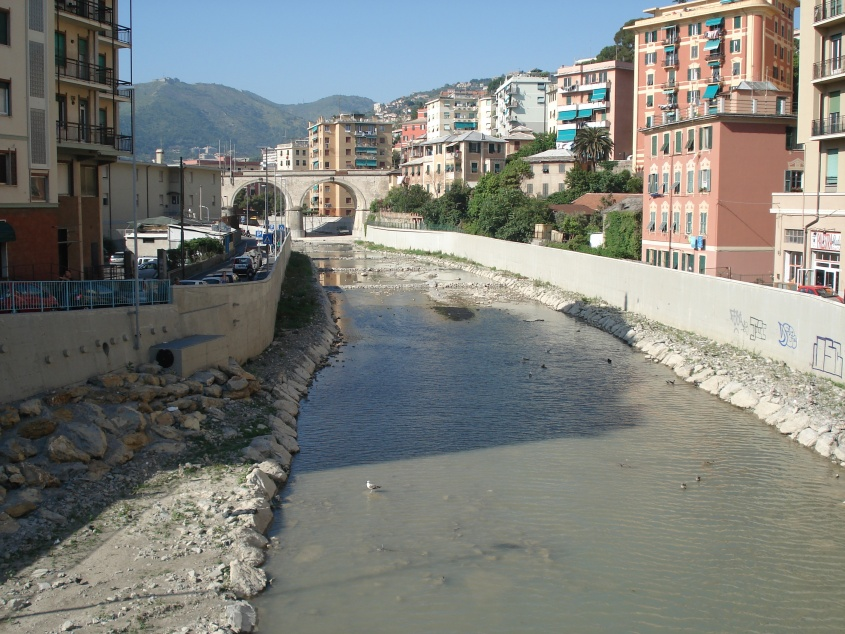
Sturla river

Sturla is bisected by the Sturla river. The river is ten kilometers long and rarely dry. It starts in the districts of San Desidario and Bavari where it runs through a narrow valley between the slopes of Monte Fasce and Monte Ratti, then coming to the area of Borgoratti. On the way it collects the waters of tributaries such as the Pomà river, the Canè river, the Penego river and other smaller streams.

== Sturla beach ==
Considered by many to be the finest beach in Genoa, Sturla beach spreads out to either side of the mouth of the Sturla river. One of the first free beaches heading east from the city center it attracts vast numbers of people all through the summer months. Many people also come for the many bars and restaurants that open directly onto the beach.

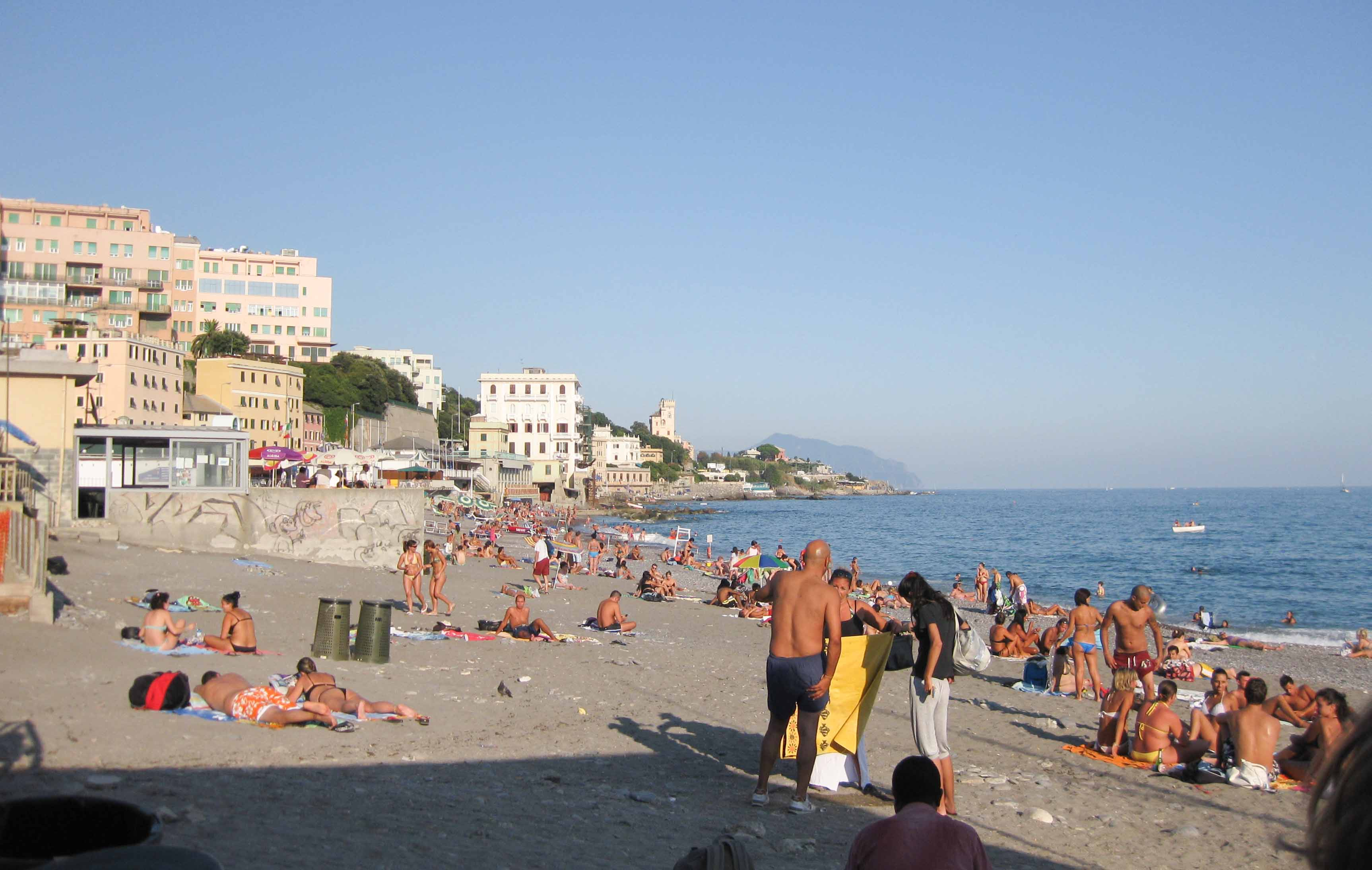
Sturla beach at the start of the summer season

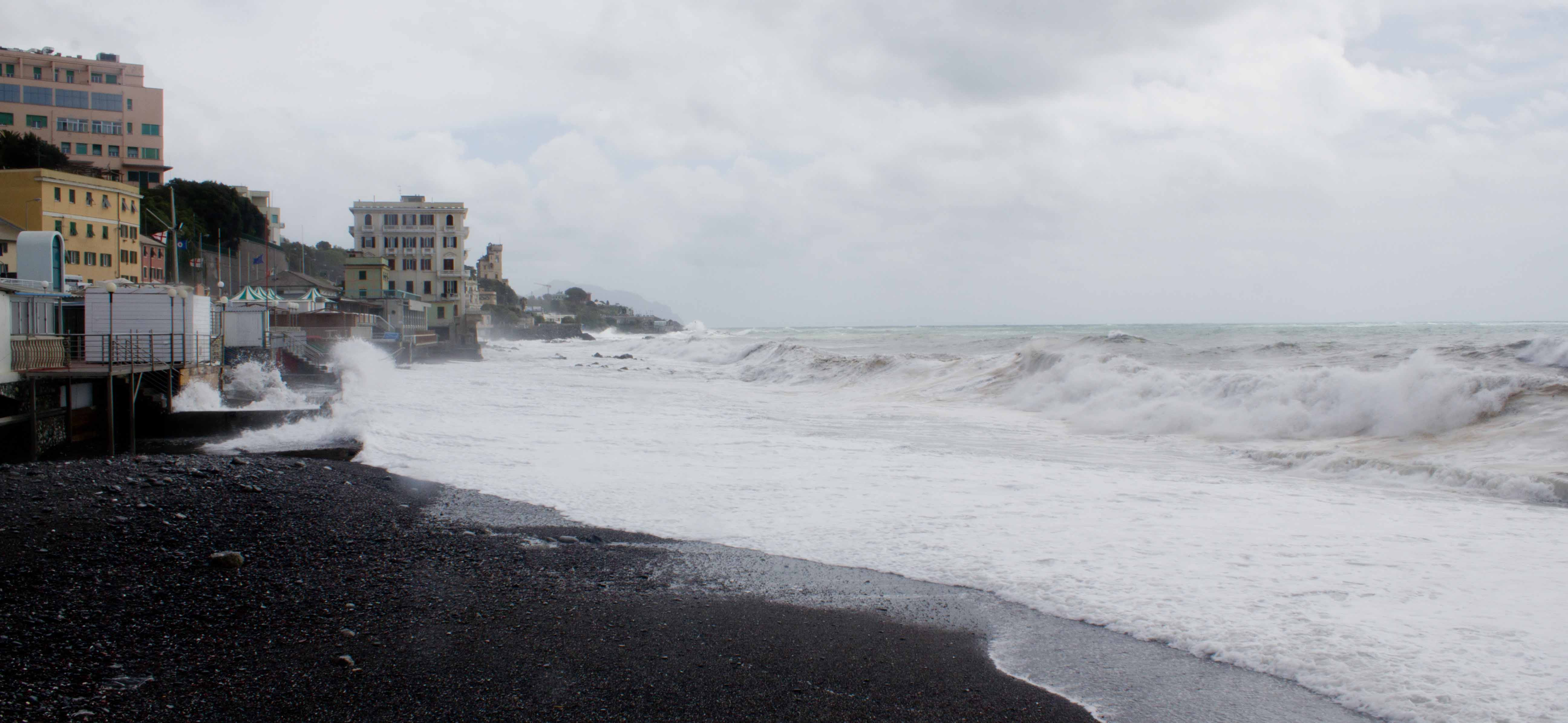
Winter waves covering Sturla beach

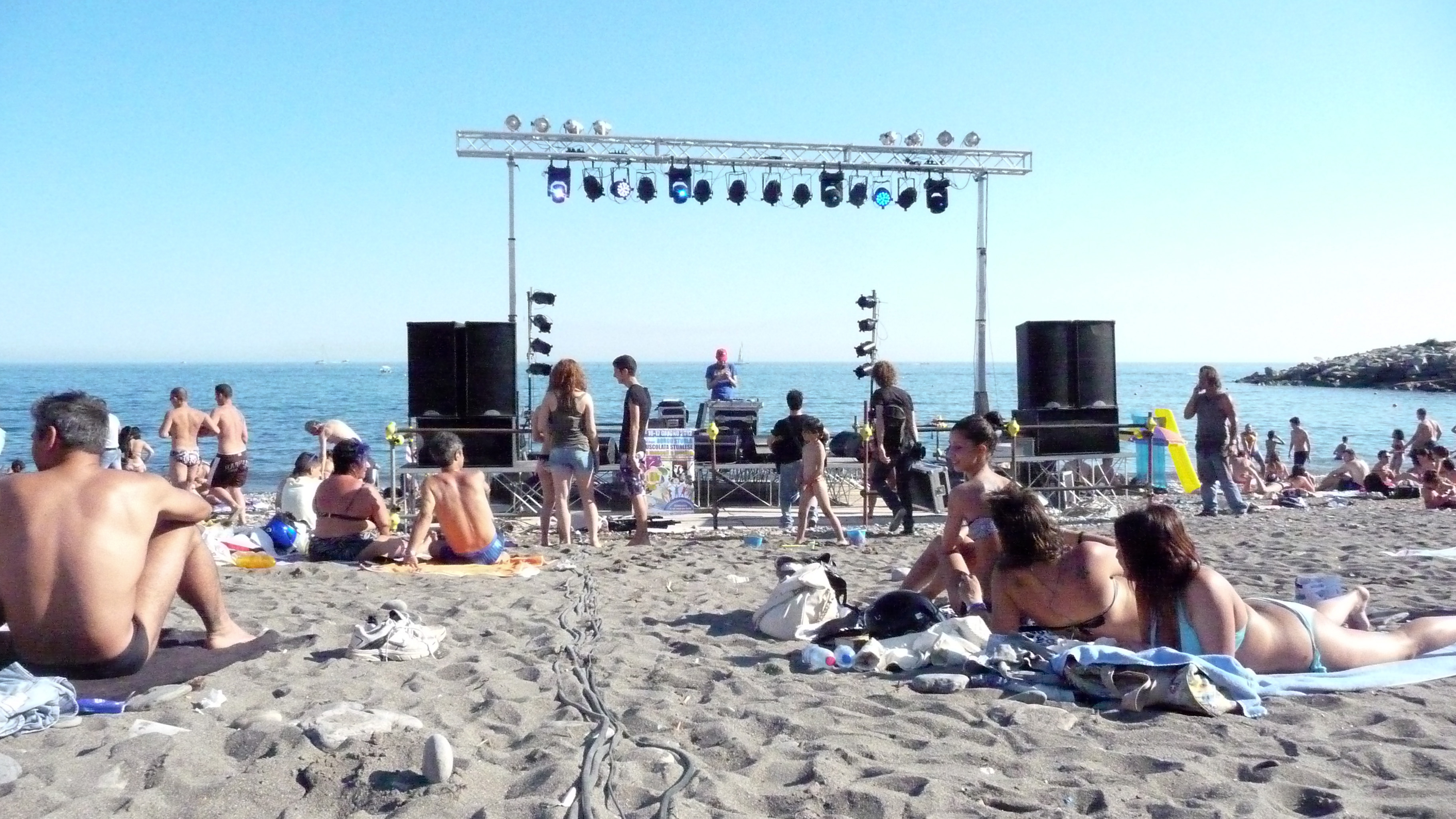
Preparing for a beach concert

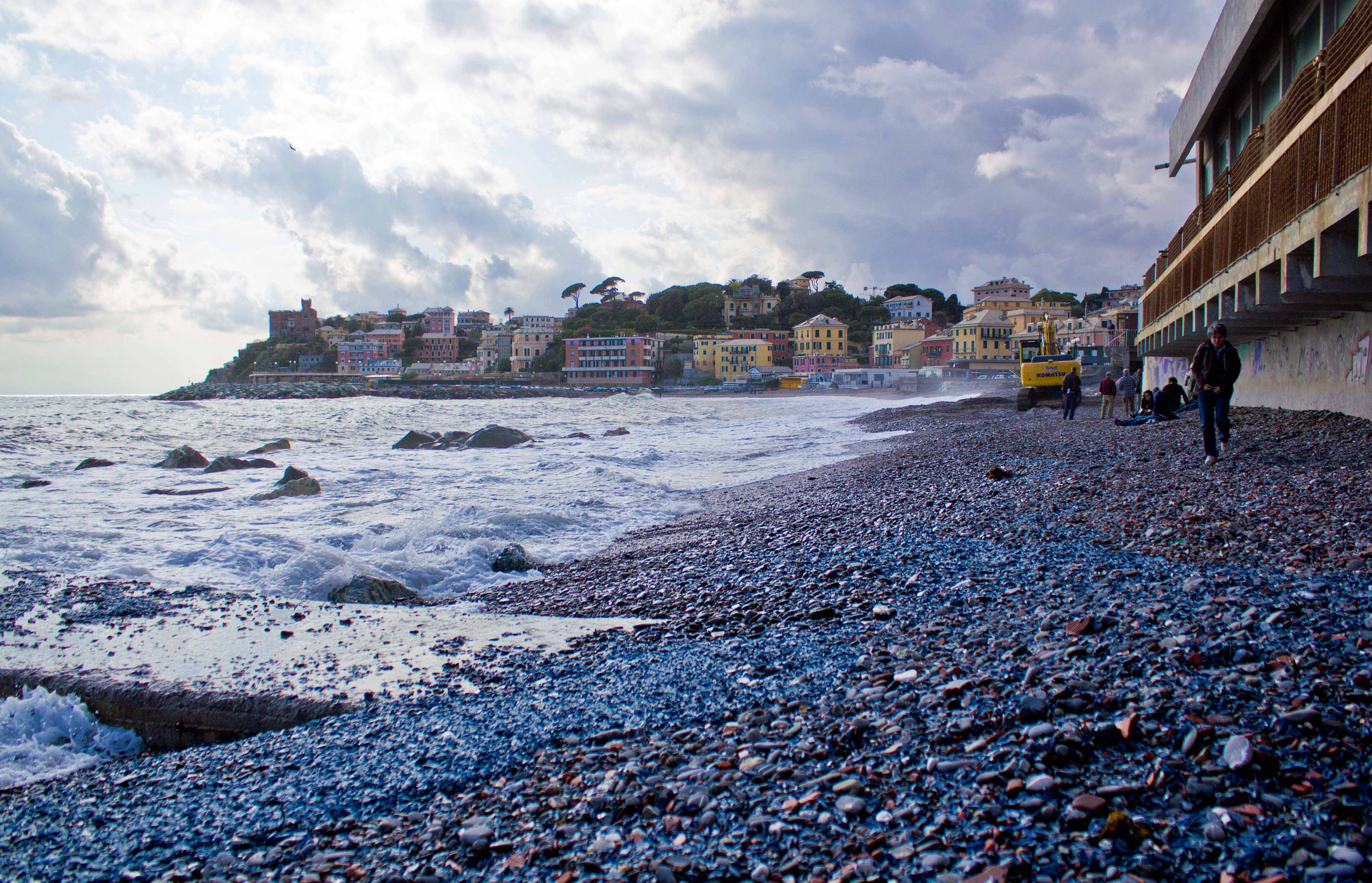
Blue Velella covering Sturla beach

== Places of interest ==
=== Church of the Santissima Annunziata ===
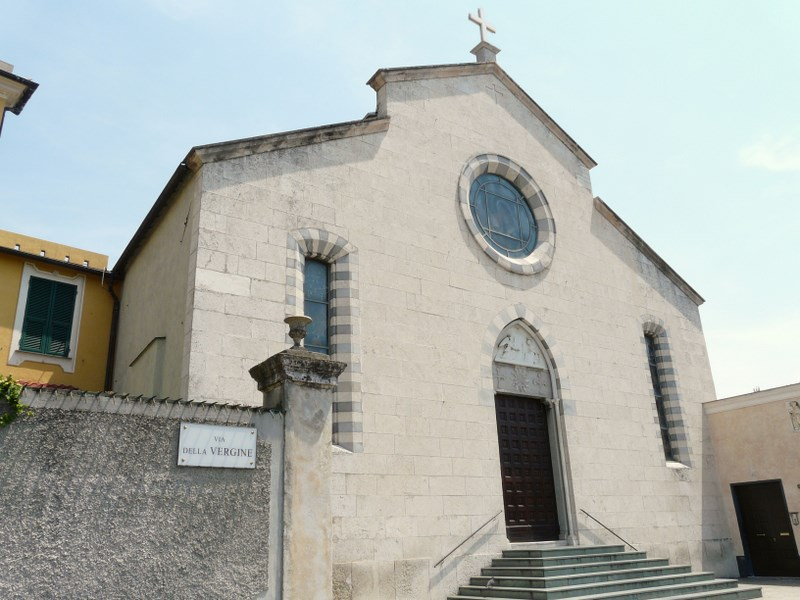
Church of the Santissima Annunziata

The church of the Santissima Annunziata, in a dominant position over Piazza Sturla was built between 1434 and 1435 and is now the home of the parish church of the Deanery of Albaro in the Archdiocese of Genoa.

The church was built at the behest of two priests, Pietro Micichero and Domenico Verrucca, who had founded a congregation of secular canons. From 1441 it was officiated by the Canonici di San Giorgio in Alga, popularly called "Celestini", who remained there until 1668 when the congregation was dissolved by Pope Clement IX. It then passed on to the Order of Saint Augustine, who had to leave in 1797 due to Napoleonic laws which suppressed religious orders. It was then entrusted to secular clergy, becoming a branch of San Martino d'Albaro. It underwent several renovations and expansions, and became a parish in its own right in 1894. In the 1940s the church underwent a major restoration, which involved almost a total renovation of the building. This reconstruction virtually erased the various reconstructions of the Baroque era to bring the building, at least in its essential structure, back to its original fifteenth-century form, although the restoration was undertaken in an interpretive and not scientifically rigorous fashion. The church has three naves, each complete with its own semi-circular apse. The side naves are separated from the central by four columns on each side connected by semicircular arches.

The facade was built freely reinterpreting the original style, with two monofora windows (narrow windows with an arched top and single opening), a central rose window and the original slate architrave above the entrance.

It contains notable works of art from the sixteenth and seventeenth centuries, including a Madonna and Child and Saint Sebastian and Saint Roch (San Rocco). They're of the Venetian school of the sixteenth century. There is also a Madonna and Child and Saint Anthony by Gregorio De Ferrari (1690) and a sixteenth-century fresco, again depicting Saint Sebastian and Saint Roch.

=== Oratorio di San Celso ===
The church of San Celso, the first religious building built in Sturla, located in Vico del Pesce, not far from the mouth of Sturla river, is now the oratory of the Disciplinati di Sturla, under the title of Saint Roch. It was built in the fourteenth century (the first records date back to 1311), restored in 1391 and completely rebuilt in 1594. In 2002 it was completely restored. Already an independent parish, in 1406 it became subordinate to San Martino d'Albaro, under the patronage of the Spinola family. It later became the oratory of the brotherhood named Santi Rocco e Nazario e Celso.

There are remarkable preserved frescoes painted between the fourteenth and the seventeenth century, while other works of art, including the altarpiece depicting the Saints Roch, Nazarius and Celsus, Catherine of Siena and Saint Sebastian, by Bernardo Castello, were transferred to the parish church of the Santissima Annunziata.

=== Oratorio di S. Giovanni Battista e monastero delle Battistine ===
Sturla contains the convent of Sisterhood of St. John the Baptist, a religious order of women founded in the mid-eighteenth century by Giovanna Maria Battista Solimani. The nuns moved here in 1924 from their original location in the centre of Genoa, in the street still called "Salita delle Battistine”. Next to the convent is a church dedicated to St. John the Baptist, consecrated on 18 June 1960, containing the tomb of the founder.

== History ==
The historical events of Sturla are closely tied to those of Genoa. Until the start of the 20th century, the area, like the other two municipalities to which it belonged (San Francesco d'Albaro and San Martino d'Albaro), was made up of small settlements of farmers and fishermen, away from the main communication routes of the time.

The oldest historical references regarding the area of Sturla refer to the frequent fights between Guelphs and Ghibellines that bloodied Genoa in the Middle Ages. There were also reports of clashes between the Grillo and Vento family in 1179.

In 1284, Oberto Doria, Captain of the People and Admiral of the Republic of Genoa, during the war against Pisa, which culminated on August 6 in the same year as the battle of Meloria, deployed his ships in front of the Sturla beach, waiting for the events to unfold.

On 26 November 1322 the Guelphs attacked the castle of Sturla, containing the garrison of the Ghibellines, who controlled the Bisagno valley. After two days the besiegers, who also possessed a trebuchet, pummeled the castle with stones, fatally weakening the walls, and the castle constructed by Antonio Doria was forced to surrender. In 1363, during a banquet given by the nobleman Pietro Malocello in honor of Peter I, King of Cyprus, visiting Genoa, the Doge, Simone Boccanegra was mysteriously poisoned.

Sturla was once famous for its zavorristi, the men who loaded and unloaded the ballast required by sailing ships to maintain the right balance out at sea.

== Infrastructure and transport ==
=== Roads ===
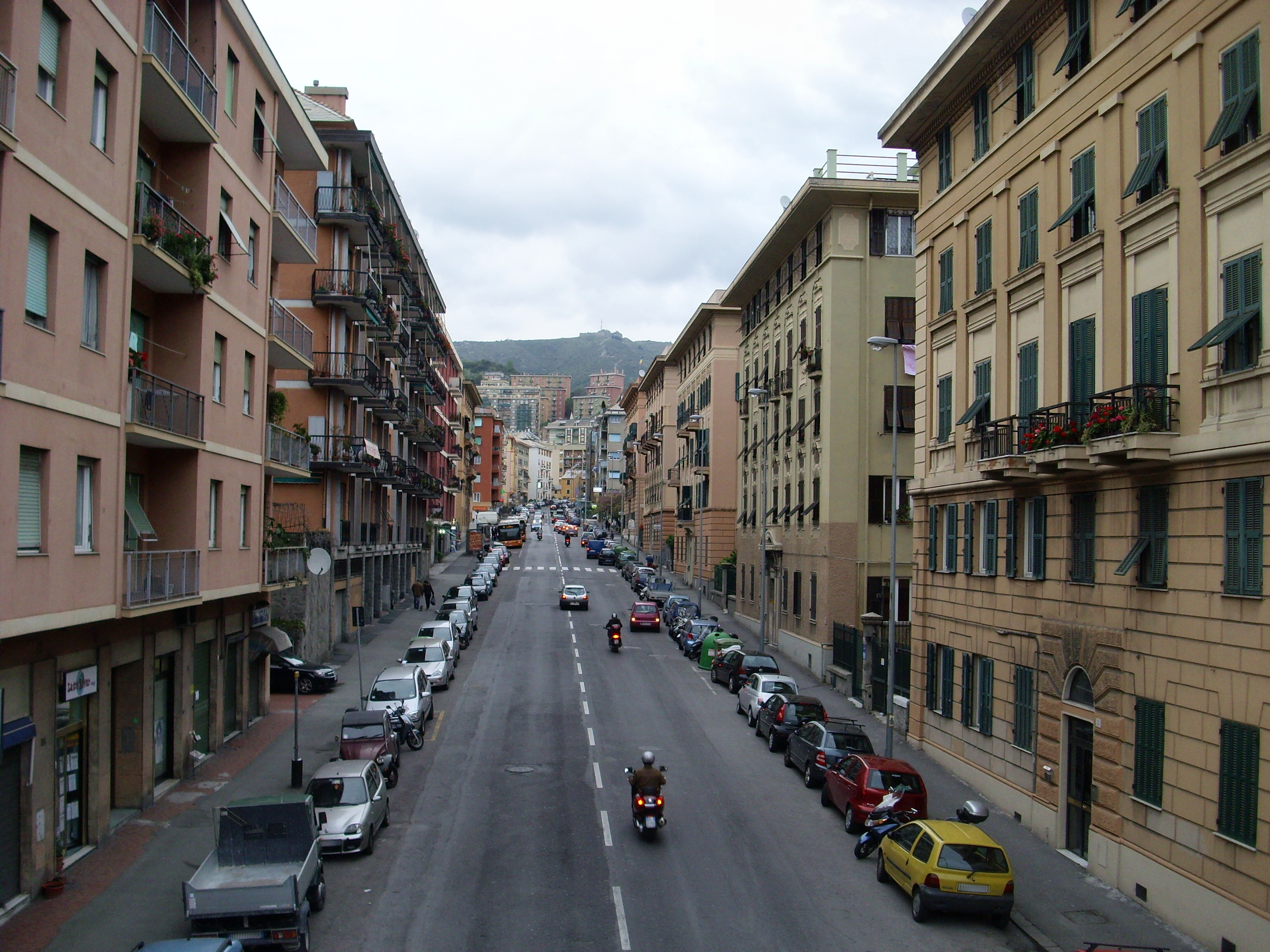
Via Isonzo

Initially Via Aurelia, which was used from the Middle Ages until the Napoleonic era, avoided the sea, passing along Via Antica Romana di Quarto, over Ponte Vecchio di Sturla (a medieval bridge with two arches) and along the streets of Casette, Pontetti and Vernazza. With the road revolution in the nineteenth-century a main road opened up between Genoa, Albaro and Sturla. It was a continuation towards Genoa of the new coastal Via Aurelia, which in 1808 had reached Nervi from Levante. The new road, perpendicular to the ancient creuze (little streets that lead down toward the sea), put an end to the isolation of the city from Levante, reaching Piazza Sturla, heading towards San Martino and then on to Genoa. In the twentieth century more roads were built, starting from Piazza Sturla, that more directly linked Sturla to the centre of Genoa.

Piazza Sturla was more recently enlarged with a viaduct that leads from Via Caprera over the valley of the Vernazza river. Small secluded ancient fishing settlements still remain amongst this sea of modern roads.

From Piazza Sturla, Via Sturla and Via Isonzo lead to Corso Europa, a road built in the sixties, linking the neighbourhoods to the east of Genoa to the city centre.

The nearest motorway exit is Genoa-Nervi, on the A12, 4 miles from Sturla.

=== Railways ===
Sturla has a railway station on the Genoa – Pisa line, in which only regional trains stop. It's used for connections to the other parts of city and the coastal towns Levante Riviera.

== Environment ==
In Sturla there is a Site of Community Importance, as was proposed by the Natura 2000 network of Liguria, for its particular nature and geology. The site is located between Boccadasse, Sturla, Quarto dei Mille, Quinto al Mare and Nervi. It has a very particular habitat formed by Posidonia oceanica (commonly known as Neptune Grass or Mediterranean Tapeweed) and coral formations. Among the animal species are the following fish: tentacled blenny, tompot blenny, seahorse, gray wrasse, brown wrasse, pointed-snout wrasse, east Atlantic peacock wrasse.

== Culture ==
Sturla had one of the most famous groups of singers of Genovese trallalero folk music. The “Canterini Vecchia Sturla” were formed in 1926 but no longer exists.

== Sport ==
La Sportiva Sturla, founded in 1920, is active in water sports (swimming and especially water polo in which they won the championship in 1923, breaking for a single year, a string of successes of their rivals, Andrea Doria, which lasted for twenty years). In more recent times, the water polo team, having missed out on promotion to the A1 league in the early nineties, currently plays in Serie B.

La Sportiva Sturla has organized since 1969 the "Memorial Morena", an international youth swimming meet, which is held every two years, and the "Miglio Marino di Sturla" swimming competition in the open sea, which has taken place since 1913, which over the years has seen amongst its competitors swimmers of an international standard. Among these we can mention in the men's Mattia Alberico and Marco Formentini, and in the ladies Paola Cavallino and Giorgia Consiglio (the women's race has been held since 1986). The ASD Urania di Vernazzola, established in 1926, is active in rowing and sport fishing.

The Circolo Nautico Sturla, founded in 1981 by some sturlesi is active in sailing, and pesca subacquea (fishing while scuba diving). The CNS is now one of the few clubs in Liguria to be awarded a title of Italian champion teams "Fishing SUB second category" (1997), and its athlete, Diego Romero, earned a bronze medal in the Laser class at the Beijing Olympics in 2008.
