= Quarto dei Mille =

District of Genoa, Italy

Coordinates: 44.3892°N 8.9919°E

Quarto dei Mille is a residential district in the east of Genoa, Italy, overlooking the sea. Located between the Sturla and Quinto al Mare districts, it was originally called Quarto al Mare (Ligurian: Quarto a-o Mâ). It was re-named after the 1860 Expedition of the Thousand (Garibaldi's volunteer force), who embarked for Sicily there.

In 1926, it was integrated into the municipality of Genoa.

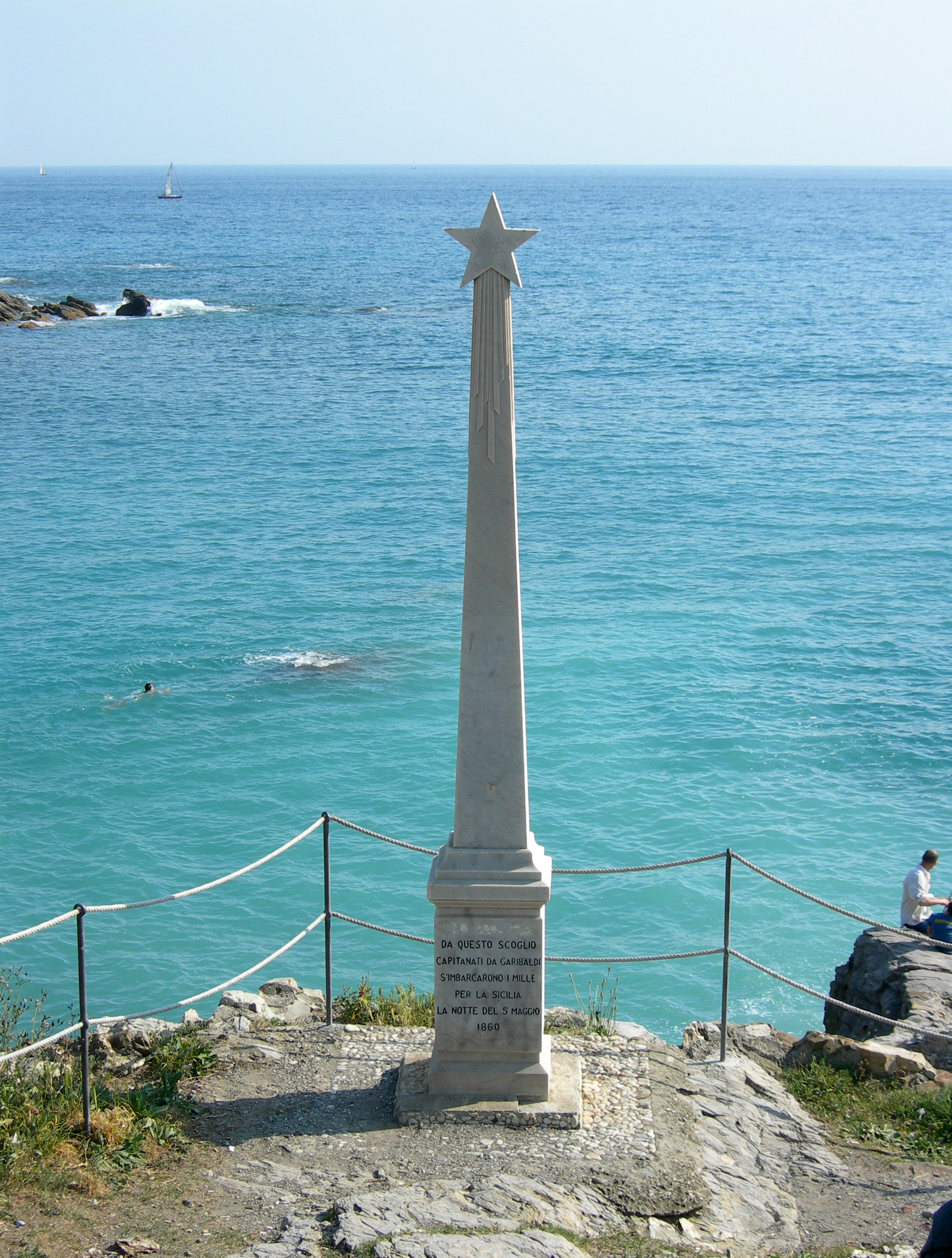
Monument to the Expedition of the Thousand

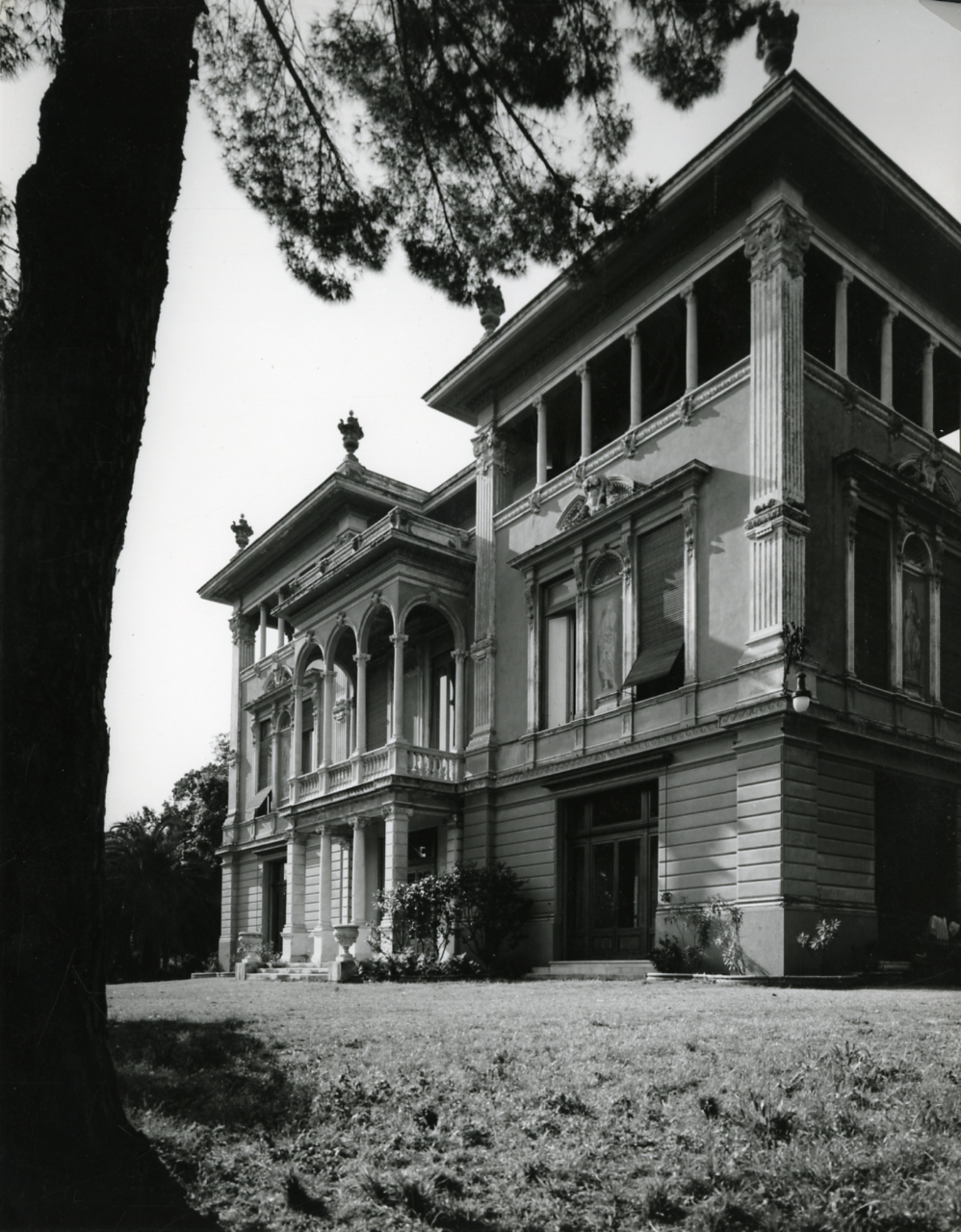
Villa Doria Spinola Quartara. Photo by Paolo Monti, 1963.

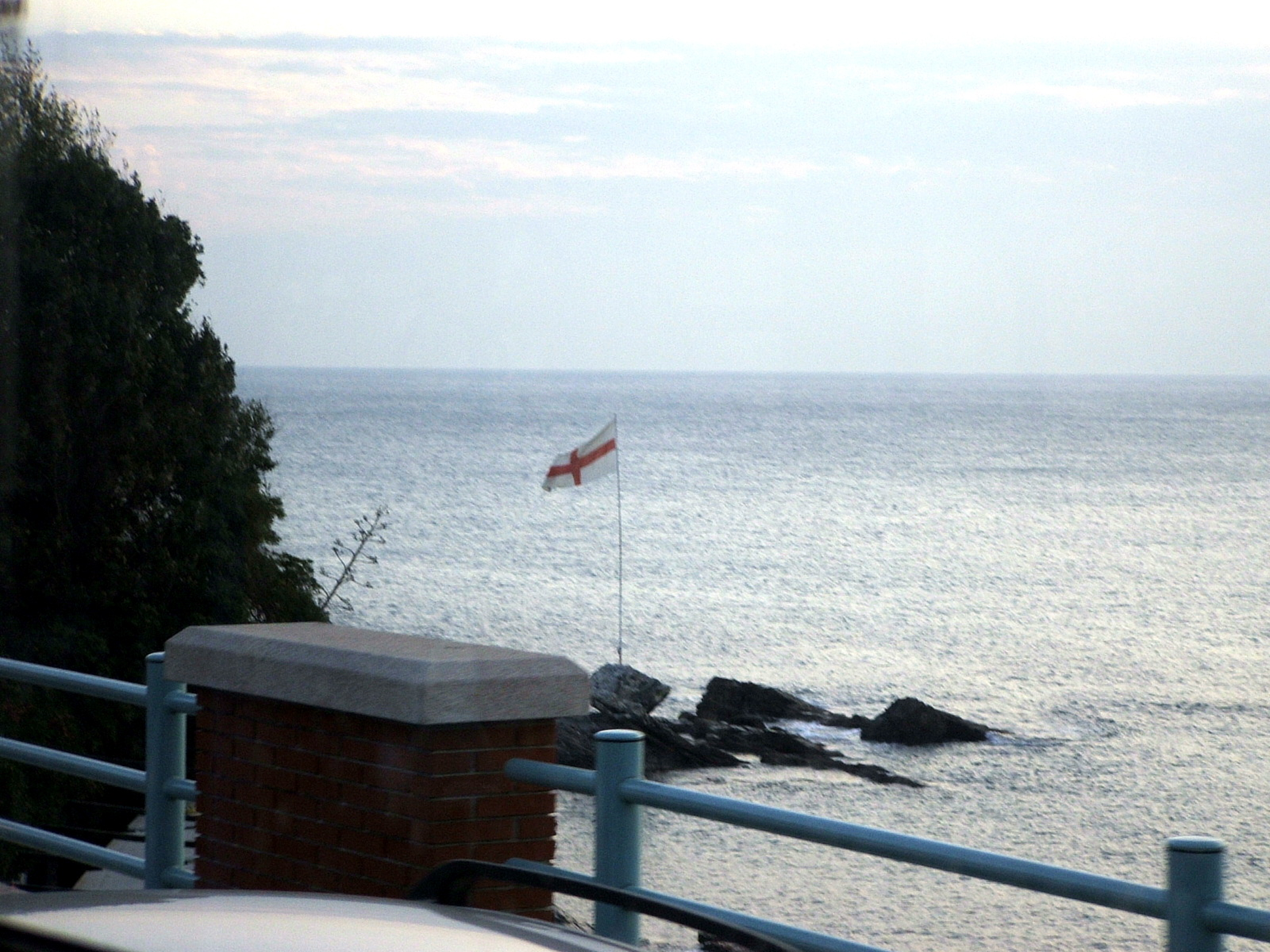
The banner of the city – the St. George's Cross – floats above the sea near the shore of Quarto
