= Corso Italia (Genoa) =

Main promenade of Genoa, Italy

Coordinates: 44.391321°N 8.967383°E

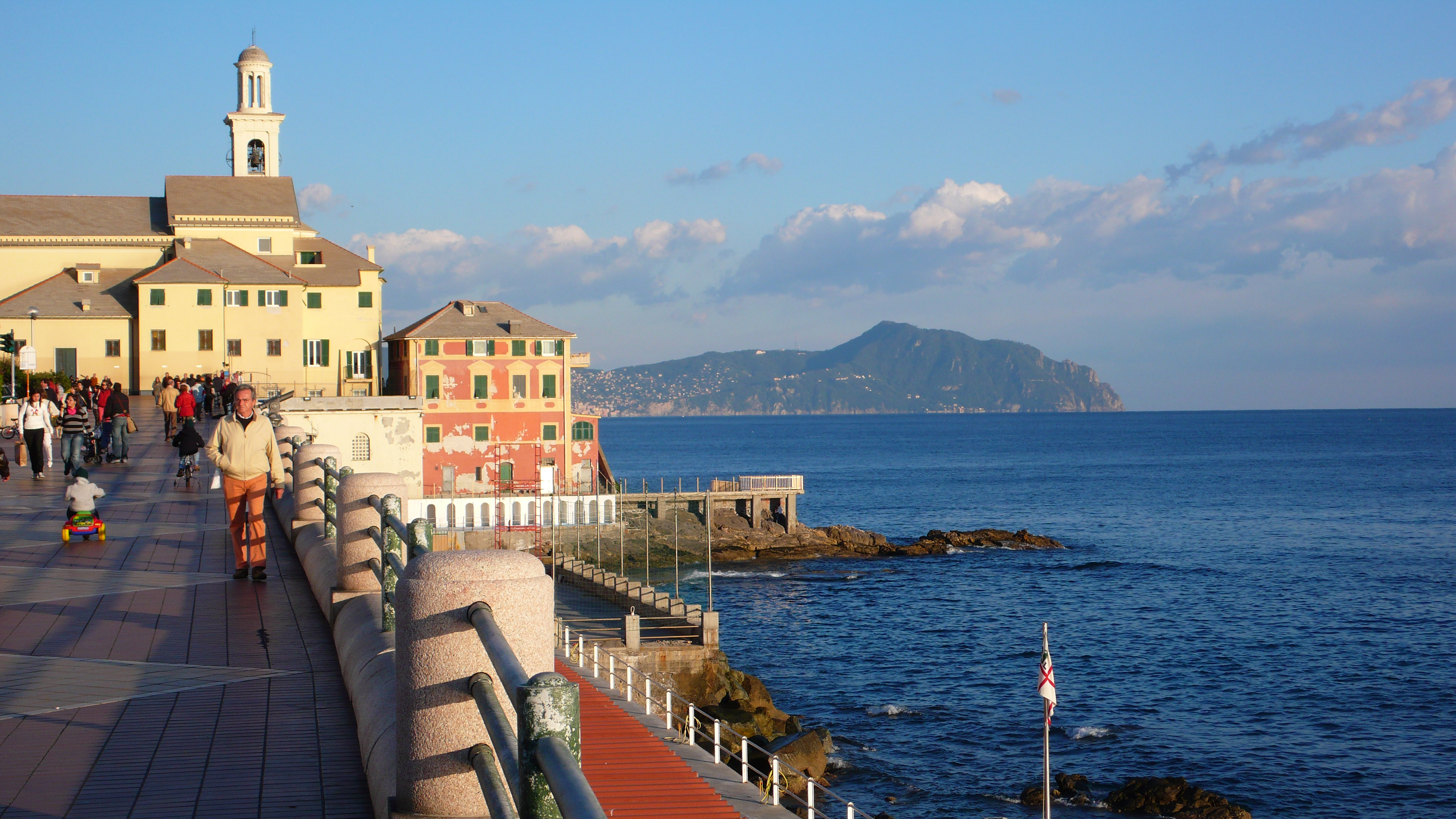
Corso Italia and the promontory of Portofino in the background

Corso Italia is the main promenade of Genoa, Italy. It is one of the main roads of the neighbourhood of Albaro, east of the city centre. About 2.5 kilometres long, the promenade connects the quartieri (neighbourhoods) of Foce and Boccadasse.

== History ==
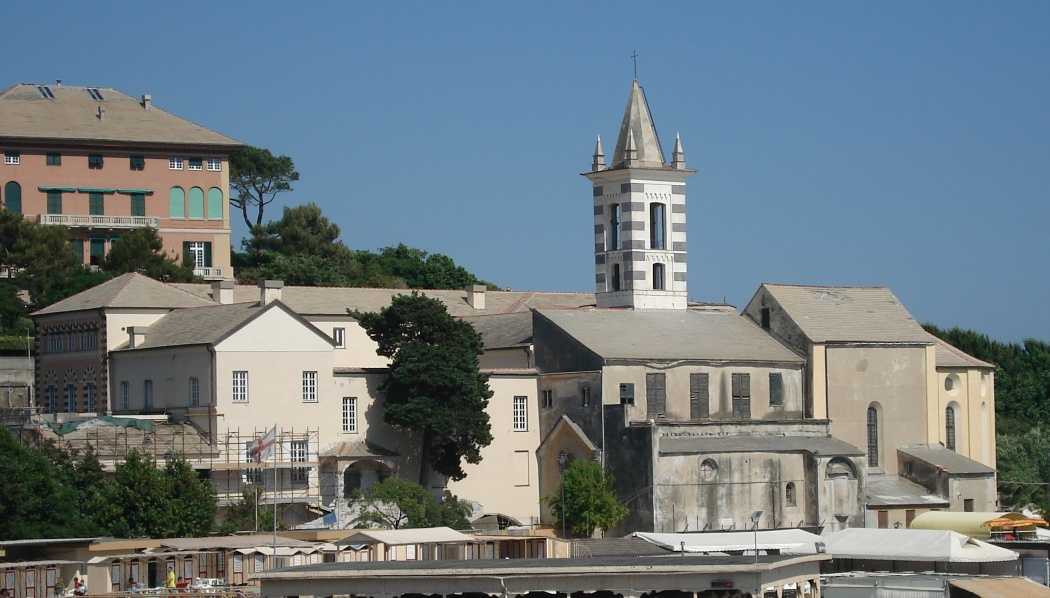
San Giuliano Abbey

Before the urbanization of the eastern neighbourhoods of Genoa, only narrow roads and paths crossed the hills and the cliffs where today Corso Italia runs. The promenade was built after the First World War, as result of the ambitious development plan of the whole neighbourhood of Albaro, approved in 1914. During the late 1980s and the early 1990s it went through a complete restyling, which included new sidewalks and street furnitures.

== Today ==
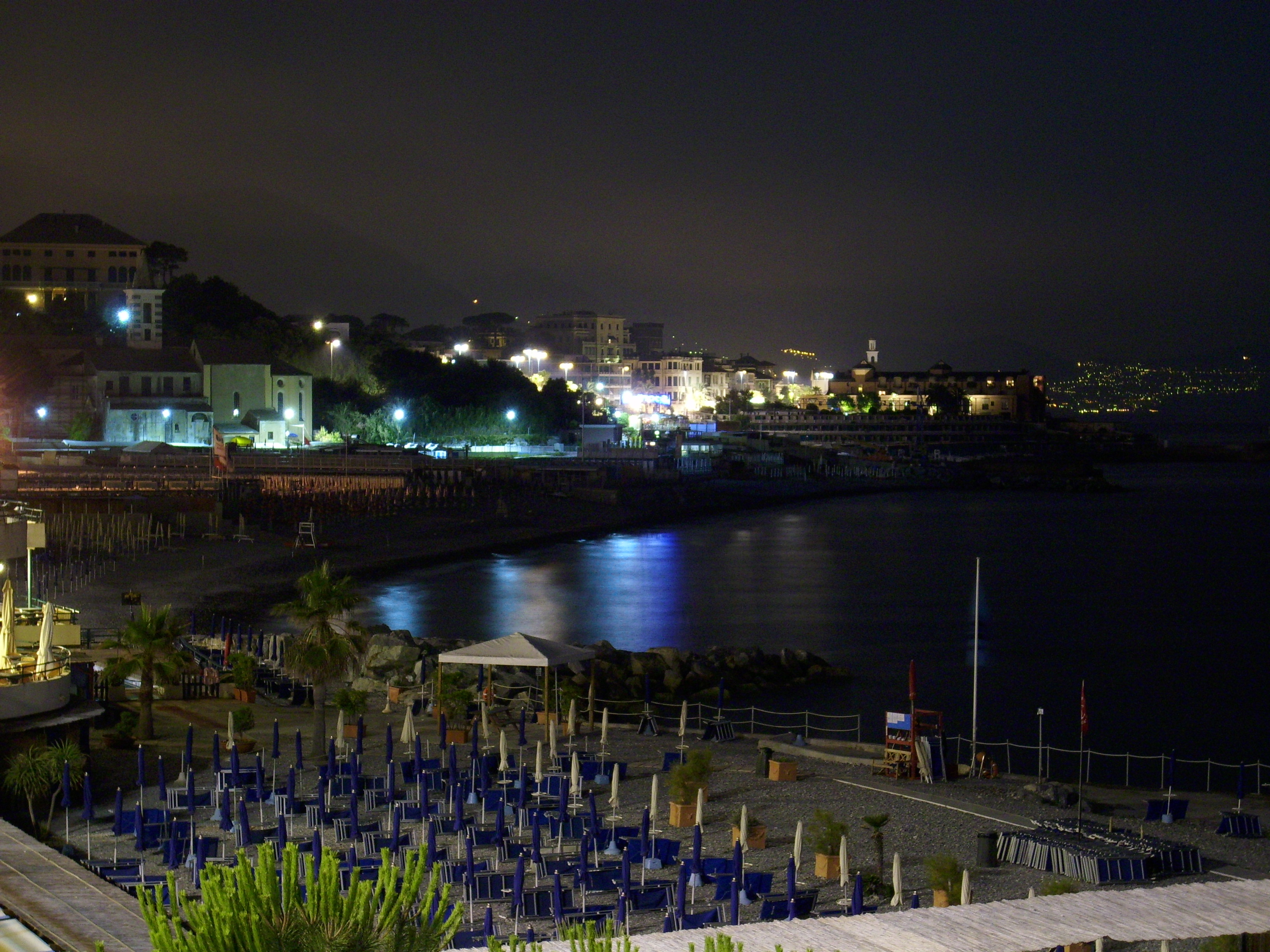
the beaches by night

The promenade, a favourite place in the city for strolling and jogging, it's very popular for its private beaches, restaurants, bars, swimming pools and sport facilities, crowded by Genoeses all year round. The most notable landmarks and points of interest along Corso Italia are: the Punta Vagno lighthouse (installed in 1931), the San Giuliano Abbey (built in 1282), the fortress of San Giuliano (one of the sixteen fortresses of the Walls of Genoa), the Nuovo Lido of Albaro (a famous beach resort where, in the 50s, the catwalk for the selection of Miss Italia was located and at this location Sophia Loren was appointed as Miss Lido), the fishing village of Boccadasse and the church of Sant'Antonio.

== Transport ==
Corso Italia can be reached from the city centre by public transport, with bus line 31 departing from Brignole railway station or, alternatively with bus line 42 departing from Piazza De Ferrari.
