= Church of the Santissima Annunziata in Sturla =

Roman Catholic church in Liguria, Italy

Church of the Santissima Annunziata in Sturla (Chiesa della Santissima Annunziata di Sturla)
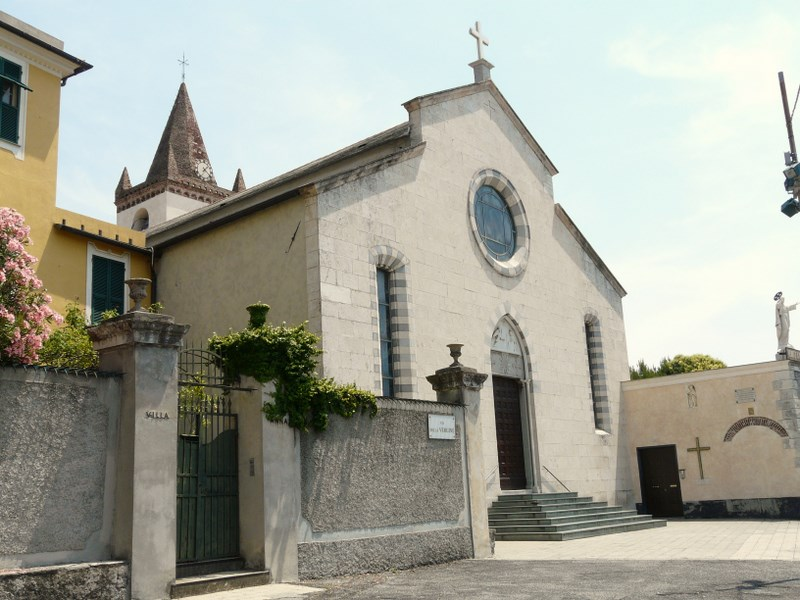
- The façade of the church

Religion
- Affiliation: Roman Catholic
- Province: Genoa
- Year consecrated: 1966

Location
- Location: Genoa, Italy
- Interactive map of Church of the Santissima Annunziata in Sturla (Chiesa della Santissima Annunziata di Sturla)
- Coordinates: 44.394658°N 8.981497°E

Architecture
- Type: Church
- Groundbreaking: 1434
- Completed: 16c

The church of the Santissima Annunziata in Sturla (Italian: Chiesa della Santissima Annunziata di Sturla) is a Roman Catholic church of the neighbourhood of Sturla, in the city of Genoa, in the Province of Genoa and the region of Liguria, Italy.

The church, in a dominant position over Piazza Sturla, was built between 1434 and 1435 and is now the home of the parish church of the Deanery of Albaro in the Archdiocese of Genoa.

The church was built at the behest of two priests, Pietro Micichero and Domenico Verrucca, who had founded a congregation of secular canons. From 1441 it was officiated by the Canonici di San Giorgio in Alga, popularly called "Celestini", who remained there until 1668 when the congregation was dissolved by Pope Clement IX. It then passed on to the Order of Saint Augustine, who had to leave in 1797 due to Napoleonic laws which suppressed religious orders. It was then entrusted to secular clergy, becoming a branch of San Martino d'Albaro. It underwent several renovations and expansions, and became a parish in its own right in 1894. In the 1940s the church underwent a major restoration, which involved almost a total renovation of the building. This reconstruction virtually erased the various reconstructions of the Baroque era to bring the building, at least in its essential structure, back to its original fifteenth-century form, although the restoration was undertaken in an interpretive and not scientifically rigorous fashion. The church has three naves, each complete with its own semi-circular apse. The side naves are separated from the central by four columns on each side connected by semicircular arches.

The facade was built freely reinterpreting the original style, with two monofora windows (narrow windows with an arched top and single opening), a central rose window and the original slate architrave above the entrance.

It contains notable works of art from the sixteenth and seventeenth centuries, including a Madonna and Child and Saint Sebastian and Saint Roch (San Rocco). They're of the Venetian school of the sixteenth century. There is also a Madonna and Child and Saint Anthony by Gregorio De Ferrari (1690) and a sixteenth-century fresco, again depicting Saint Sebastian and Saint Roch.
