= Albaro =

Neighbourhood in Genoa, Italy

Albaro Arbâ (Ligurian)
- Quartiere
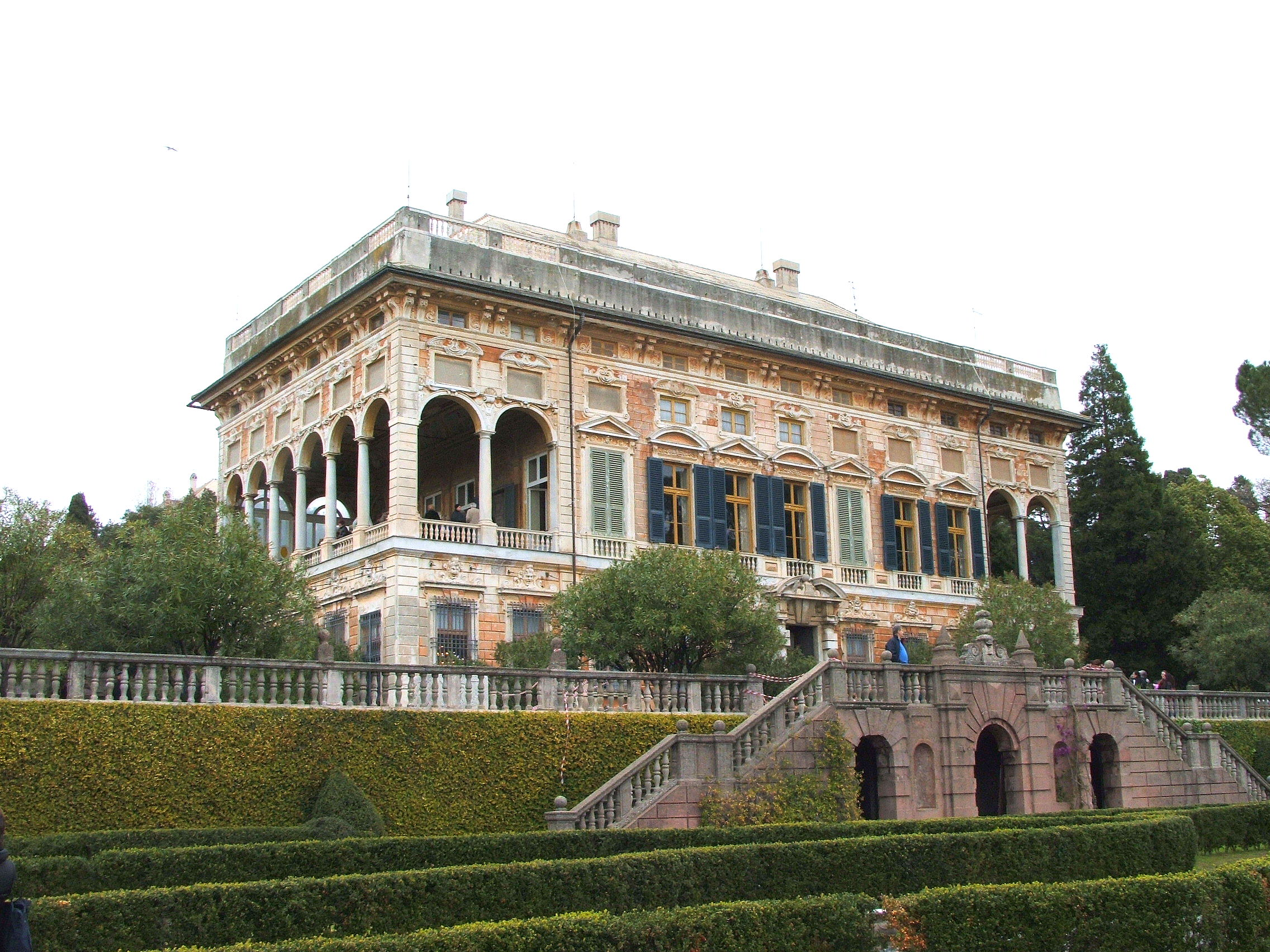
- Villa Saluzzo Bombrini, called Il Paradiso ("Heaven"), one of the most renowned villas of Albaro

- Location in northern Italy
- Coordinates: 44°23′57″N 8°57′39″E
- Country: Italy
- Region: Liguria
- Metropolitan city: Genoa
- Comune: Genoa

Population
  - Total: 28,465
- Postal codes: 16145, 16146, 16147
- Area code: 010

Albaro (Ligurian: Arbâ) is an affluent residential neighbourhood of the Italian city of Genoa, located 3 kilometres (1.9 mi) east of the city centre. It was formerly an independent comune (municipality), named San Francesco d'Albaro, and was included in the city of Genoa in 1873. At present, together with the neighbourhoods of Foce and San Martino d'Albaro, it is part of the Genoa's city VIII Municipio (Medio Levante).

From the 16th to the 19th century, Albaro was a renowned holiday resort for the Genoese upper class, who lived in the city and during summer used to move to their villas in Albaro. For few months, from September 1822 to July 1823, the romantic poet Lord Byron lived here. The English writer Charles Dickens spent in Albaro the summer of 1844, and here he wrote the short novel The Chimes. Nowadays it is a wealthy residential neighborhood, where during the last century next to the historic villas apartment buildings have been built, most of them with broad exclusive green spaces.

A well known hamlet of Albaro is Boccadasse, a fishermen's village at the eastern side of Corso Italia.

== Etymology ==
According to the historian Federico Donaver (1861–1915), Albaro probably takes its name from the ancient Ligurian word arbà, which means bay. Another hypothesis (also advanced by Donaver) suggests that it derives from the word for "dawn" (Italian alba), as Albaro hill is located east of the city of Genoa, where the sun rises.

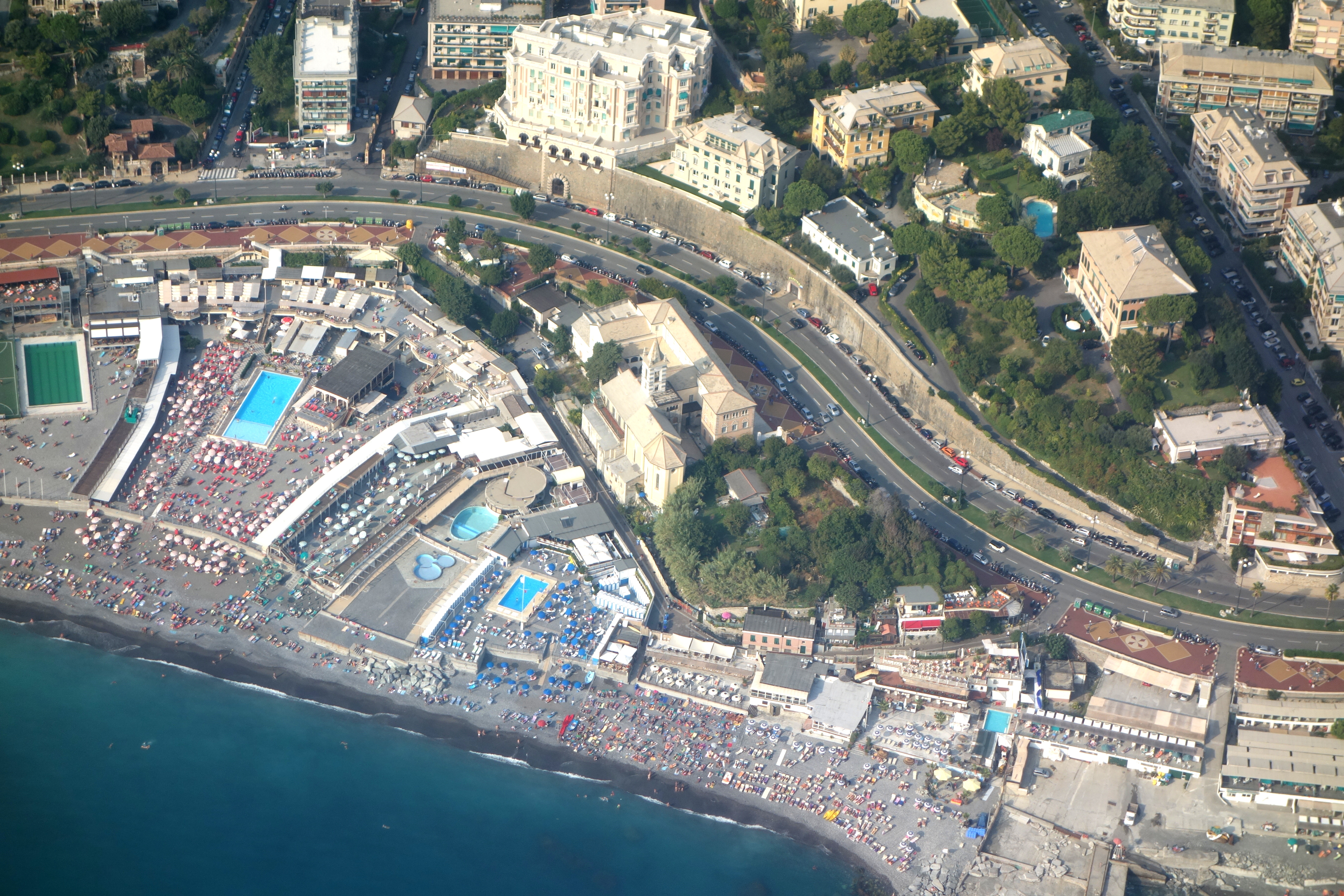
Aerial view of Corso Italia, seafront of Albaro

== Demographics ==
On 31 December 2015 there were 28,465 people living in Albaro, with a population density of 96.38 people per km^{2}.

== Geography ==
Albaro is located east of the center of Genoa. The neighborhood includes the southernmost part of a hill between the rivers Bisagno and Sturla which ends at the sea with high cliffs and small stony beaches, once accessible only through narrow crêuze. Nowadays along the coast line runs the seafront named Corso Italia.

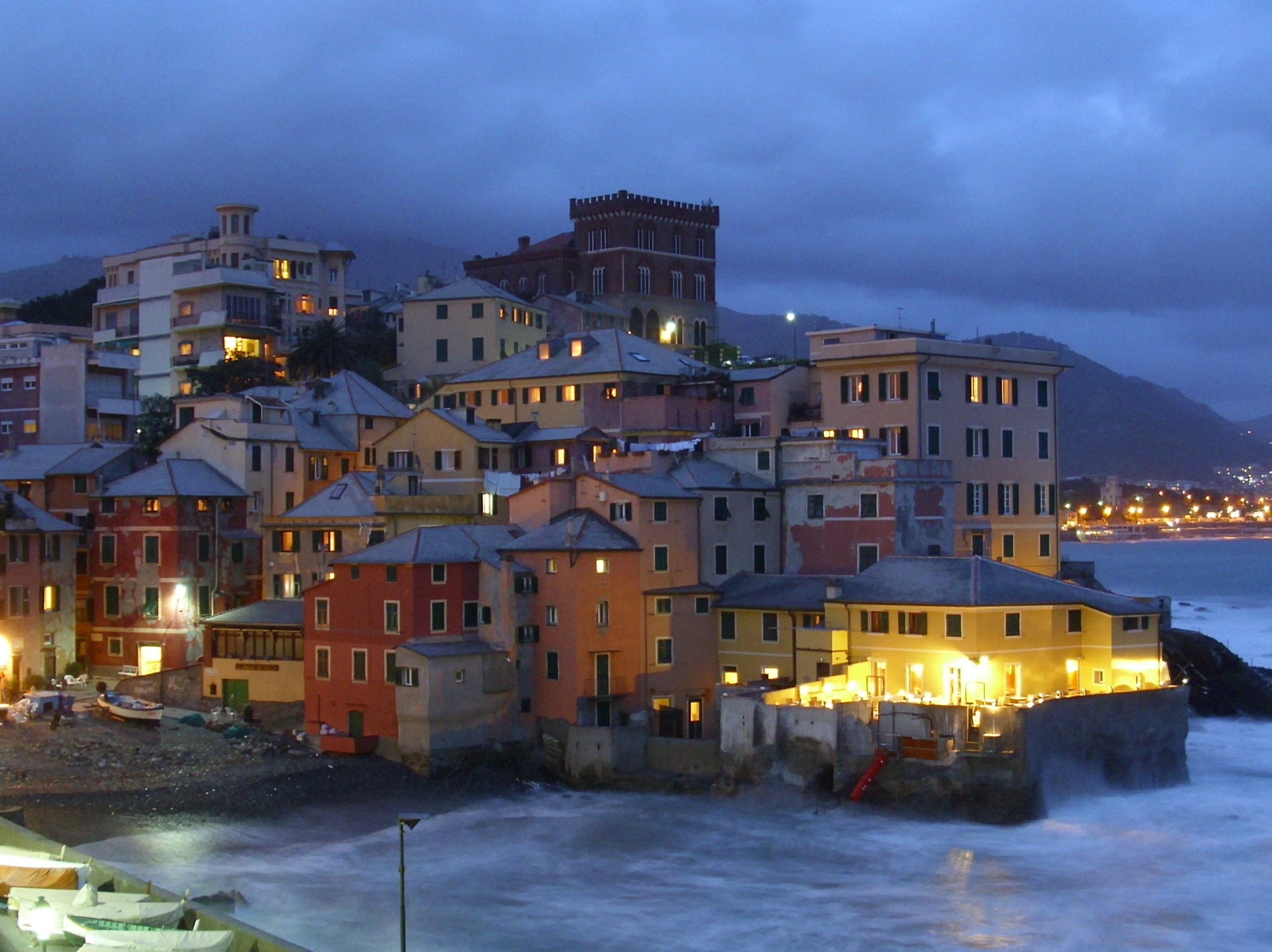
Night view of Boccadasse

Albaro includes most of the territory of the former comune of San Francesco d'Albaro, except some small areas, and its boundaries are the sea coast (Corso Italia), Via Nizza and Via Pozzo on the west side, Corso Gastaldi on the north side, via Sclopis and via Orlando on the east side.

== History ==
Until the 15th century, Albaro hill was a rural area, populated only by a few peasants, with vegetable gardens, vineyards and some monasteries. There were no settlements along the coast except for the fishermen's village of Boccadasse, where a small cove admitted the landing of boats.

From the 16th century Genoese aristocratic families built large villas in the surroundings of the city, and Albaro became one of their preferred places in which to spend the summertime. The age of the villas ended at the close of the 18th century, with the decline of the Republic of Genoa and its annexation to the Kingdom of Sardinia.

In 1873 the comune of San Francesco d'Albaro, together with other 6 communes in the neighbourhood of Genoa, was included in the municipality of Genoa, and with the master-plan of 1906 a process of urban development began. New roads suitable for car traffic were opened, and the villas gardens were divided into lots, so creating a stately and exclusive residential neighbourhood for the Genoese upper class.

== Architecture ==
=== Villas and palaces ===
During the early 16th century, the aristocratic families of Genoese ruling class built their villas, designed by the best architects, in the surroundings of the city. The hill of Albaro, on account of its proximity to the city, became a favorite place of vacation for the Genoese upper class, who in summer moved there to spend the hot season. Originally the villas formed the centres of productive agricultural estates, but later they were transformed into stately summer mansions, enriched with works of art and large parks. The construction of the villas continued down to the 18th century, but during the 19th century the rich entrepreneurial class took the place of the aristocratic. They built small villas, while the historic houses, no longer appropriate for the new needs, were divided into apartments or handed over to religious communities.

Today, some of the renovated historic mansions are divided into apartments, while others are home to private schools, clinics and nursing homes. Most of the parks were lost to new buildings, and only a few of them remain as public parks.

Some of the most notable of these historic houses are:

- Villa Bagnarello, where Charles Dickens lived from July to September 1844
- Villa Brignole Sale Villa Brignole Sale, built at the beginning of the 17th century, restored after the damage of the World War II, now a private school
- Villa Giustiniani Cambiaso, designed by architect Galeazzo Alessi around 1548, now seat of the Engineering Department of Genoa University
- Villa Saluzzo Bombrini, designed by Andrea Ceresola at the end of the 16th century, now divided into apartments. Here the singer-songwriter Fabrizio De André lived in his boyhood
- Villa Saluzzo Mongiardino, where Lord Byron lived between 1822 and 1823

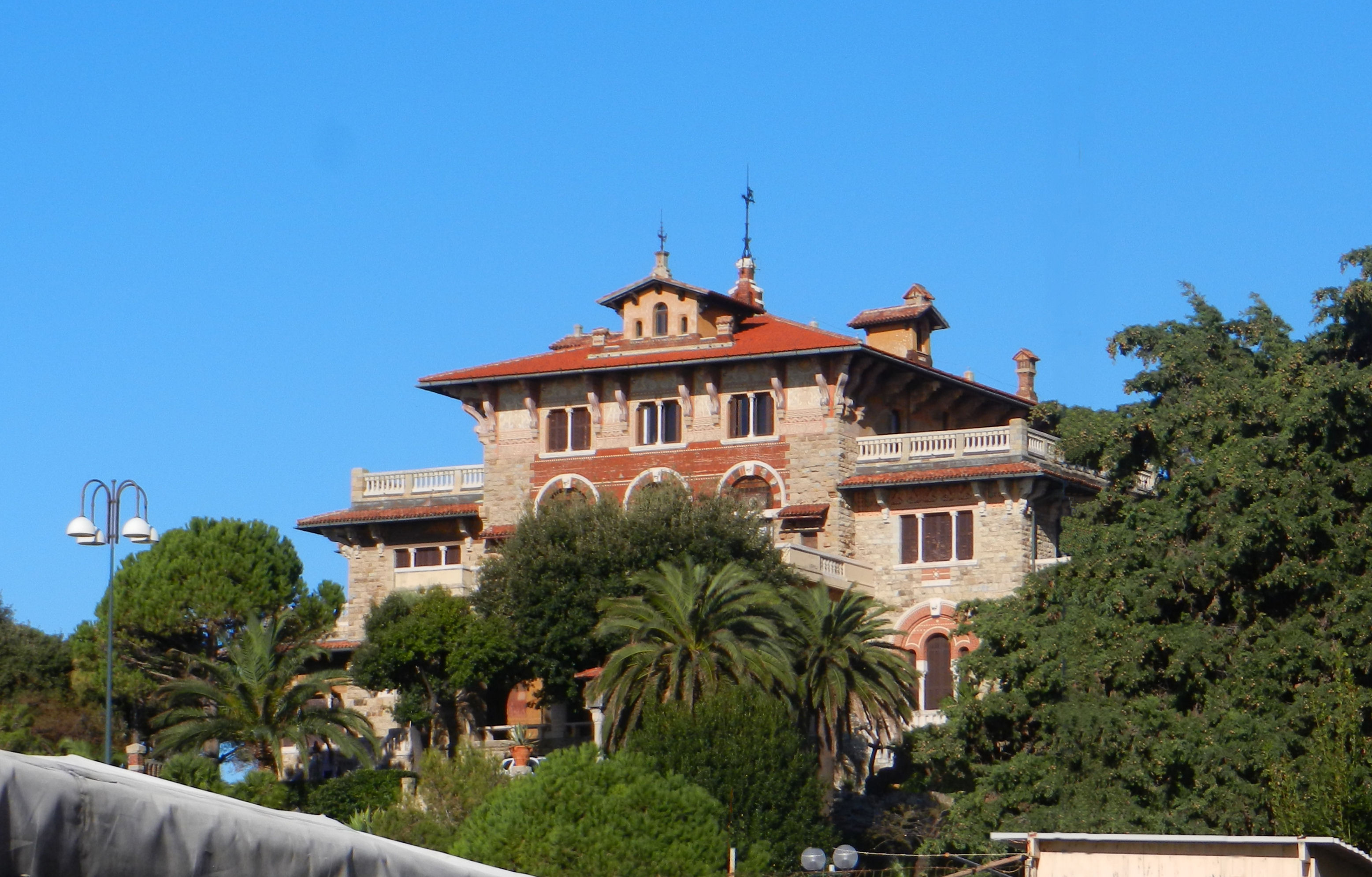
Villa Canali Gaslini

Houses built in the first decades of 20th century reflect the architectural styles of that time. Gothic revival, Art Nouveau and rationalist buildings can be seen.

The best examples in these styles of architecture are the Villa Canali Gaslini and the Castle Türke (both designed by Gino Coppedè), the rationalist buildings of Luigi Carlo Daneri, and the more recent Palazzo Ollandini, original building of Robaldo Morozzo della Rocca.

=== Places of worship ===
In Albaro there are today five Catholic parish churches, among them the historic churches of San Francesco d'Albaro, with a monastery of Friars Minor Conventual (built in the 14th century, and in which today Greyfriars still officiate), and Sant'Antonio in Boccadasse (18th century). Since World War II, owing to the increase of population three new modern churches have been constructed (N.S. del Rosario, Santa Teresa and San Pio X).

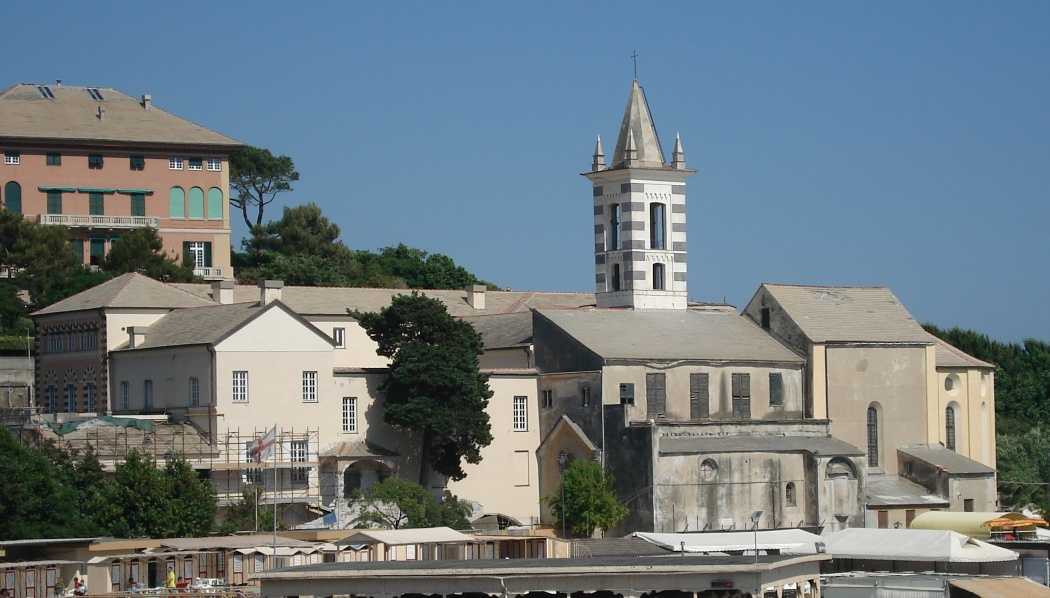
San Giuliano Abbey

Other notable churches include San Giuliano Abbey, now close to Corso Italia, built in the 13th century: this is the only one of several small churches built on the seashore to survive. Santa Maria del Prato, near to San Francesco d'Albaro, was built in Romanesque style in 1172 by Canons Regular of the Holy Cross of Mortara, and since 1935 it has housed the nuns of the Institute of Sisters of the Immaculata. In the church there is the grave of the founder Saint Agostino Roscelli.

In ancient times there were other churches in Albaro which no longer exist owing to urban expansion. The best known of these was dedicated to Saints Nazario and Celso, the ruins of which were demolished for the construction of Corso Italia. The others were those of San Vito, Santa Giusta, San Luca and Sant'Elena.

== Notable people ==
- Agostino Roscelli (1818–1902), Catholic priest, founder of the "Sisters of the Immaculata", lived his last years in Albaro, where died on 7 May 1902; he was canonized by Pope John Paul II on 10 June 2001.
- Gerolamo Gaslini (1877–1964), entrepreneur, founder of Giannina Gaslini children's hospital, lived from 1948 in the Villa Canali Gaslini, today seat of Gerolamo Gaslini Foundation.
- Fabrizio De André (1940–1999), singer-songwriter, lived as a boy in the villa Saluzzo Bombrini.
- Gino Paoli (1934–2026), singer-songwriter, lived for a period in Albaro, formerly in Boccadasse and latterly in the "villa Paradisetto".
- Raffaele Rubattino (1810–1881), entrepreneur, shipping magnate, and proponent of the reunification of Italy and of colonial efforts in Eritrea. Co-founder of Navigazione Generale Italiana along with Vincenzo Florio.

Many notable people resided in Albaro at different times (among them Guido Gozzano, Charles Dickens, George Byron and Gabriello Chiabrera).

== Bibliography ==
- Guida d’Italia – Liguria. TCI, Milan. 2009.
- Caraceni Poleggi, Fiorella (1984). Genova – Guida Sagep. SAGEP and Automobile Club of Genoa.
- Praga, Corinna (1989). Crêuze in Albaro. SAGEP, Genoa.
- Praga, Corinna (2006). Genova fuori le mura. Fratelli Frilli Editori, Genoa. ISBN 88-7563-197-2.
- Remondini, Angelo (1882). Parrocchie suburbane di Genova, notizie storico-ecclesiastiche. Tipografia delle letture cattoliche, Genoa.
- Casalis, Goffredo (1841). Dizionario geografico, storico, statistico e commerciale degli stati di S.M. il Re di Sardegna. G. Maspero, Turin.
