= Quinto al Mare =

Quinto al Mare Quinto
- Genoa neighbourhood
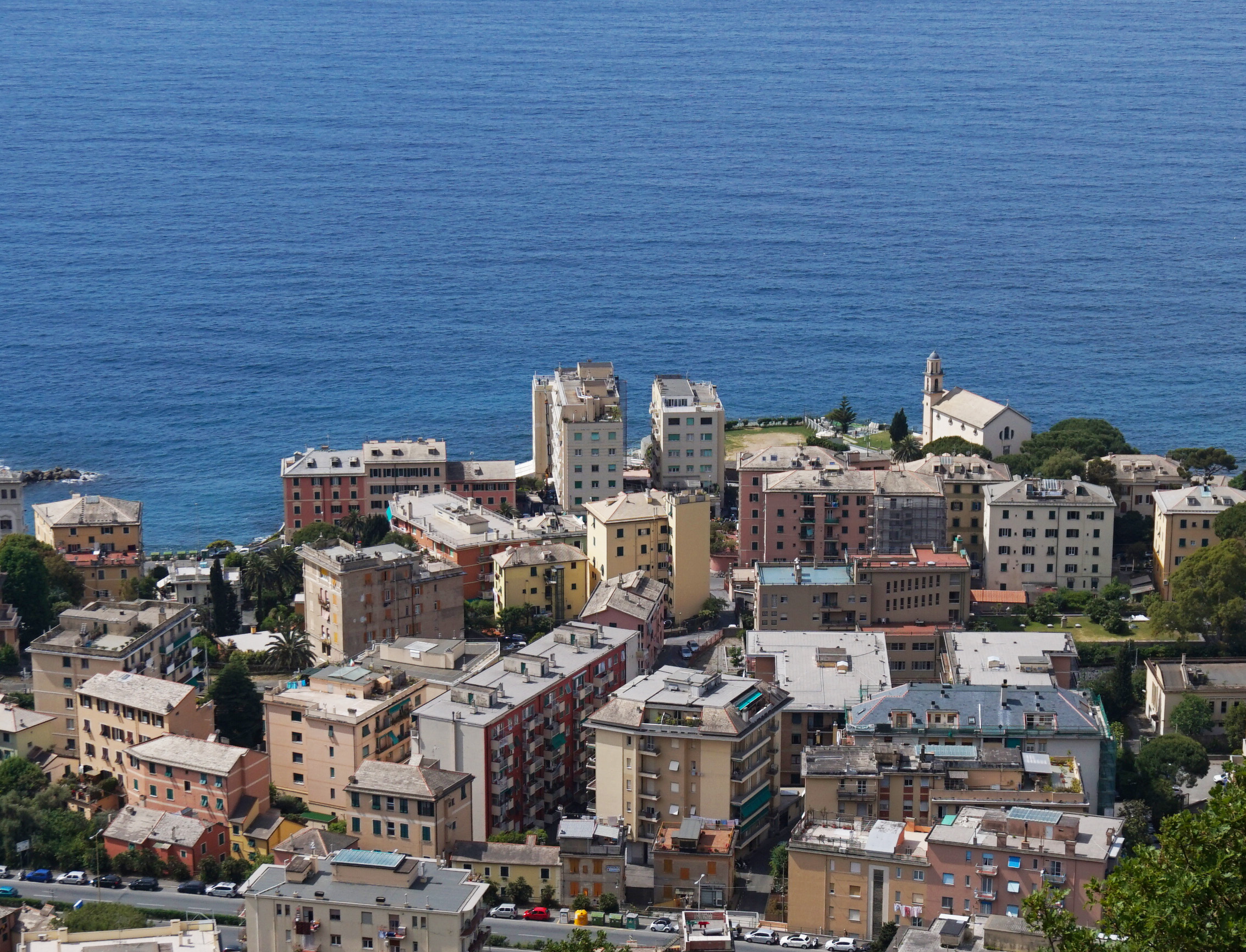
- Panorama of Quinto al Mare

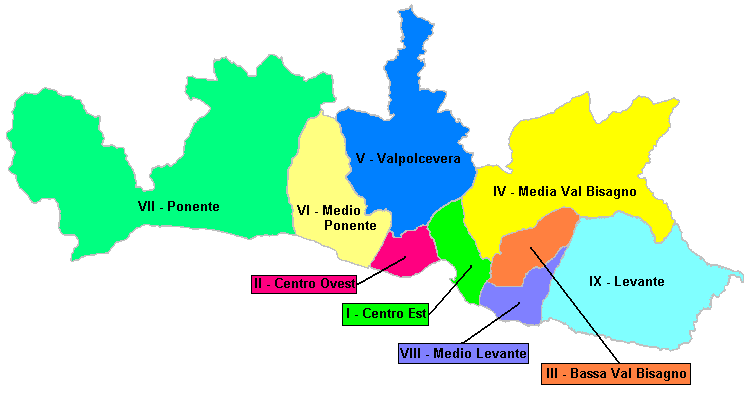
- Sovereign state: Italy
- Region: Liguria
- Metropolitan City: Genoa (GE)
- City: Genoa
- Municipal district: District IX Levante

Area
  - Total: 2.89 km^{2} (1.12 sq mi)

Population (2022)
  - Total: 8,109
  - Density: 2,810/km^{2} (7,270/sq mi)

Quinto al Mare (also called simply Quinto) is a residential neighbourhood of 8,109 inhabitants in the municipality of Genoa, part of the Municipio IX Levante. It was an independent municipality until 1926, when it was aggregated to Greater Genoa.

Located in the eastern part of the city, immediately after Quarto dei Mille (from where the expedition of the Thousand led by Giuseppe Garibaldi left on the night between 5 and 6 May 1860), the neighborhood is squeezed between the sea and the last slopes of Mount Fasce which take the name of Mount Moro.

It borders Nervi, once a holiday resort, known for its particularly mild climate and natural border of the nearby municipality of Bogliasco to the east, and Quarto dei Mille to the west.

Quinto al Mare is home to some of the most renowned beach resorts in the city, and some characteristic places where it is possible to taste the specialities of Ligurian cuisine.

== Geography ==
Quinto al Mare extends at the foot of the slopes of Mount Fasce and Mount Moro. Rio Bagnara flows into the beach of the same name from these descending streams, and Rio San Pietro, which takes its name from the parish church. The viaducts of the A12 motorway cross the valleys upstream.

== History ==
The cliff and the beach of Scalo The town owes its name to its location at the fifth mile from Genoa along the medieval road, today called "Via Antica Romana", which led to the eastern coast and Tuscany[3], which crosses the district a little further upstream from the state road 1 Via Aurelia.

In 1033 the town obtained the status of municipality. Inserted in the territories of the Republic of Genoa, the village of Quinto was subjected to the podestà of Bisagno and, in 1606, to the subsequent captaincy.

The historian Agostino Giustiniani reports that the inhabitants of the area, attacked several times by Saracen raids, built a fortress on site, near which, at the end of the 14th century, the Ligurian factions of the Fieschi (belonging to the Guelph current) and the Adorno (who belonged to the Ghibellines) clashed. The battle ended with the victory of the Fieschi, who occupied the fortress, killing all those inside. The building was then dismantled following the bombings of Genoa by the English fleet in 1746 and again in 1814: in its place the Casa dei Capitani was built in the mid-nineteenth century.

Via Provinciale (now Via Gianelli) at the end of the nineteenth century. You can see the original railway line (later moved upstream) and the old station.

The Quinto district in a postcard from the 1960s During the era of the Republic of Genoa, the seaside village gave many of its inhabitants to the Genoese fleet that raged on the seas in the eighteenth century. Only in the nineteenth century did it transform into a shipbuilding center for the construction of merchant sailing ships for coastal navigation. It was therefore, from that moment on, home to sailors, some of whom became famous, such as the "Captain Cheerful", known by the nickname "Corsaro Allegro".

The neighborhood - built on the slopes of Mount Moro as a fishing village - claims the birthplace of Christopher Columbus, even if the sources regarding his birth are uncertain and often contradictory. There is talk of a villa in the area upstream of the current Corso Europa, in the locality of Terra Rossa, on the slopes of Mount Moro, where the family of Christopher Columbus lived. The navigator is depicted in a fresco in the local parish church of San Pietro, on the Via Antica Romana di Quinto. The parish church was, at the beginning of the nineteenth century, the initial seat of the activity of Santa Paola Frassinetti, to whom the square overlooking the bell tower and its southern side are dedicated.

With the Napoleonic advent of the late eighteenth century, and the consequent fall of the Genoese Republic in favor of the Ligurian Republic, the established municipality of Quinto al Mare was incorporated into the department of Bisagno (1797) with San Martino d'Albaro as its capital; the following year it was included in the VI canton of Nervi of the jurisdiction of Bisagno and again included, from 1803, in the V canton of San Martino d'Albaro in the I jurisdiction of the Center. Annexed to the First French Empire, from 13 June 1805 to 1814 it was included in the Department of Genoa. With the fall of Napoleon Bonaparte, the Congress of Vienna of 1814 included the Ligurian territory among the possessions of the Kingdom of Sardinia. From 1861 the municipality of Quinto al Mare was an integral part of the newly established Kingdom of Italy. From 1859 to 1926 the territory was included in the II district of Nervi of the district of Genoa, part of the then province of Genoa. With the royal decree-law n. 74 of 14 January 1926, as part of the creation of the so-called Greater Genoa, the municipality was abolished and aggregated to that of Genoa, whose new administrative entity became operational from 1 July 1926.

The construction of Corso Europa, which took place around 1961, significantly changed the balance of the territory, inducing the construction of residential nuclei further upstream, culminating then, between 1986 and 1992, in the construction of the town of Colle degli Ometti.

== Monuments and places of interest ==
=== The parish church of San Pietro ===
The first mention of the building dates back to 1198, although the current structural layout results from a renovation that took place during the 18th century and again in the second half of the 19th century. Among the preserved works of art are the canvas The Miraculous Catch of Fish by Carlo Alberto Baratta and the painting of the Delivery of the Keys to Saint Peter by Santino Tagliafichi. The oratory of Sant'Erasmo was of 15th-century origin but was rebuilt and expanded in subsequent centuries. Natural areas

=== The Oratory of Sant'Erasmo ===
In the territory of Quinto there is a site of community interest, proposed by the Natura 2000 network of Liguria, for its particular natural and geological interest. The site is located between the seabeds of the Genoese delegations of Boccadasse, Sturla, Quarto dei Mille and Nervi, where a particular habitat consisting of meadows of oceanic posidonia and coral formations is reported. Among the animal species, the following fish are present: seahorse, blackbird, rusty-cat wrasse, horned blenny, grey wrasse, long-snouted wrasse, peacock wrasse.

== Infrastructure and transport ==
=== Railways ===
There is a local railway station that guarantees connections with the city centre and the Riviera di Levante. Until 1916 this facility, called "Quinto" was located in the nearby Via Gianelli and was supported by two further railway stops in Giuncate and Via Argiroffo.

=== Urban mobility ===
Thanks to AMT lines 15, 17, and 515, which run along the seafront road and Corso Europa, the neighbourhood is connected to the centre of Genoa. The Drinbus on-call service is also in operation and managed by AMT.
