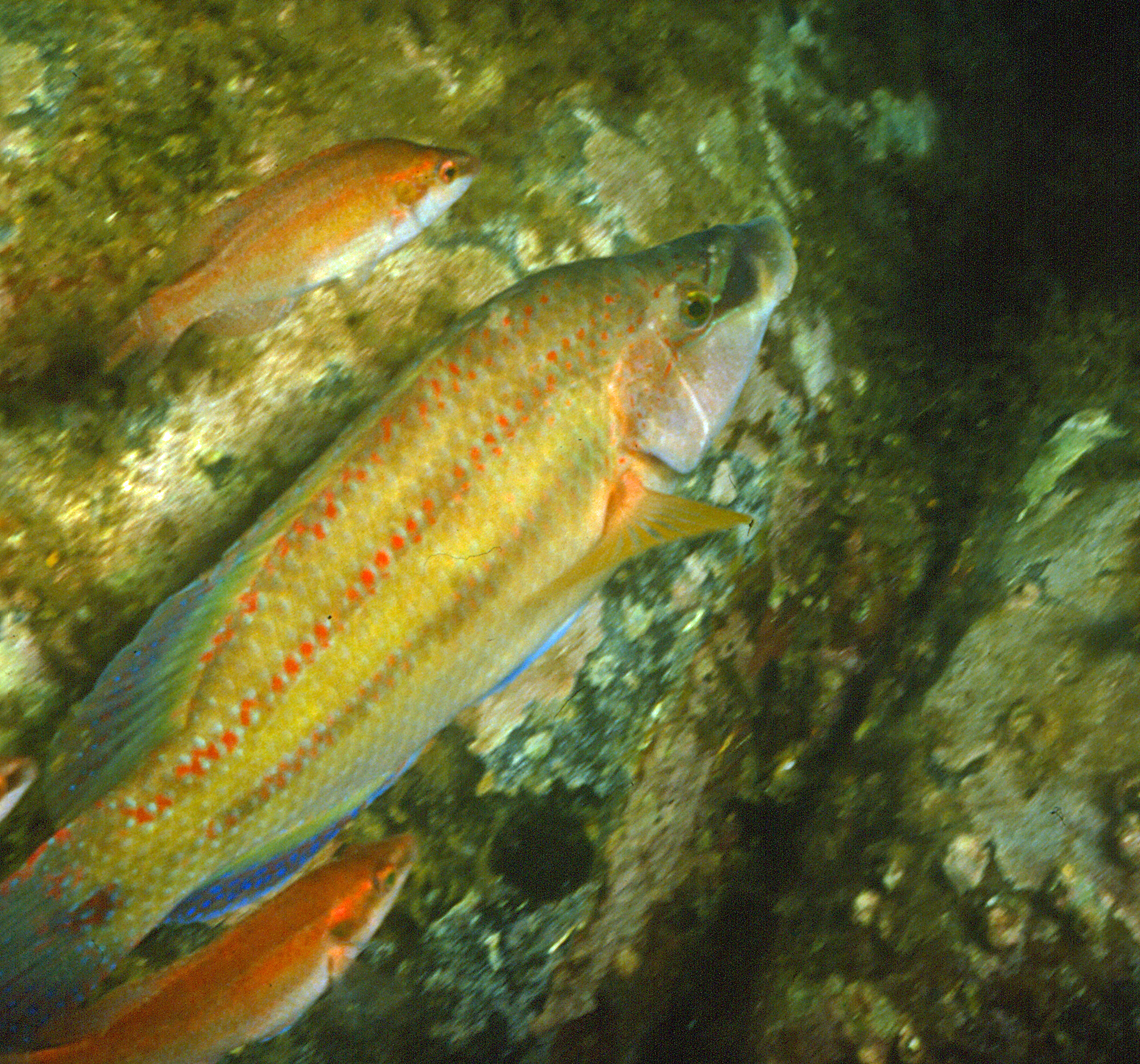

Conservation status
- Least Concern (IUCN 3.1)

Scientific classification
- Kingdom: Animalia
- Phylum: Chordata
- Class: Actinopterygii
- Division: Teleostei
- Order: Labriformes
- Family: Labridae
- Genus: Symphodus
- Species: S. tinca

Binomial name
- Symphodus tinca (Linnaeus, 1758)

Synonyms
- Labrus tinca Linnaeus, 1758; Crenilabrus tinca (Linnaeus, 1758); Labrus lapina Forsskål, 1775; Lutjanus lapina (Forsskål, 1775); Labrus polychrous Pallas, 1814

= East Atlantic peacock wrasse =

Species of fish

The East Atlantic peacock wrasse (Symphodus tinca) is a species of wrasse native to the eastern Atlantic Ocean from Spain to Morocco and in the coastal waters of the Mediterranean Sea and the Black Sea. This species lives around rocks surrounded by eelgrass and can also be found in brackish waters in lagoons. It occurs at depths from 1 to 50 m (3.3 to 164.0 ft). This species can reach 44 cm (17 in) in standard length, though most grow no larger than 25 cm (9.8 in). This species is sought as a game fish and is also important to local peoples as a food fish. It can also be found in the aquarium trade.

== Description ==
Body is oval and laterally flattened. Mouth is rather small, more or less protrusive, with rather strong canine-like teeth. There are a few cephalic pores on the snout; lips are with 6–9 folds.

Head is generally longer than body depth. Dorsal fin is very long and reaches almost to the tail. Both sexes have a small dark spot at base of caudal fin and a dark blotch just above pectoral fin. Also, many darker spots on the body form 3 or 4 longitudinal stripes.

Generally, color reflects sexual dimorphism. Females and juveniles are grey-greenish or brownish, fading to a silvery color on the belly. Between immature males and mature females there are almost no differences in color. Males are more brightly colored, especially in the breeding season. Pale green, green-bluish or green-yellowish, longitudinal rows of red spots, with upper part of head dark blue.

East Atlantic Peacock Wrasse can reach 44 cm (17 in) in standard length, though most grow no larger than 25 cm (9.8 in).

Due to relatively small dimensions, this species is rarely sought as a game fish, but it is sometimes sold locally for food when caught in local artisanal fisheries. It can also be found in the aquarium trade.

Peacock wrasse feeds on sea urchins, ophiuroids, bivalves, shrimps and crabs.

Spawning takes place in spring, when a seaweed nest is built and guarded by the male, with one or more females laying their adhesive eggs in it.

== Habitat ==
It is native to the eastern Atlantic Ocean from Spain to Morocco and can be found in the coastal waters of the Mediterranean Sea and the Black Sea.

This gregarious littoral fish is found on rocky reefs covered by algae, on sea-grass meadows, around rocks surrounded by eelgrass and can also be found in brackish waters in lagoons. It occurs at depths from 1 to 50 m (3.3 to 164.0 ft).

== Fishing ==
This species is of little commercial value - trammel net is the main commercial fishing gear for catching East Atlantic peacock wrasse.

In recreational fishing, it is often caught on light rod and reel, hand line or small longline. It is not particular about bait and will gladly grab a small chunk of fish, prawns, paste and even bread.

Larger specimens can be caught with the speargun.

== Cuisine ==
Symphodus tinca is often underestimated regarding its taste and aroma - meat is soft, tender and very tasty. Unfortunately, larger specimens are rare. Smaller fish can be pan fried or made as part of mixed fish soup. Larger specimens are barbecued or prepared as part of mixed fish stew.
