= White seabream (disambiguation) =

White seabream may refer to

- Diplodus sargus, the white seabream or sargo, a species of fish from the northeastern Atlantic and Mediterranean.
- Diplodus capensis, the Cape white seabream or blacktail seabream, a species of fish from the southwestern Indian Ocean,
- Diplodus helenae, The St. Helena white seabream, a species of fish endemic to the South Atlantic Ocean around Saint Helena.
- Diplodus lineatus a species of fish endemic to Cape Verde.
