= Two-banded seabream =

Two-banded seabream is a common name for several fishes and may refer to:

- Diplodus prayensis, endemic to Cape Verde
- Diplodus vulgaris, widespread in the Mediterranean and eastern Atlantic
