= Rhabdosargus niger =

Conservation status
- Data Deficient (IUCN 3.1)

Scientific classification
- Kingdom: Animalia
- Phylum: Chordata
- Class: Actinopterygii
- Order: Acanthuriformes
- Family: Sparidae
- Genus: Rhabdosargus
- Species: R. niger

Binomial name
- Rhabdosargus niger Tanaka & Iwatsuki, 2013

Species of fish

Rhabdosargus niger, the blackish stumpnose, is a species of marine ray-finned fish belonging to the family Sparidae, which includes the seabreams and porgies. This fish is known only from the western coast of Kalimantan in Indonesia.

== Taxonomy ==
Rhabdosargus niger was first formally described in 2013 by the Japanese ichthyologists Fumiya Tanaka and Yukio Iwatsuki. The three type specimens were purchased in the Jagalchi Fish Market in Pusan where they had been imported to after being captured off the western coast of Kalimantan, the Indonesian part of Borneo. The genus Rhabdosargus is placed in the family Sparidae within the order Spariformes by the 5th edition of Fishes of the World. Some authorities classify this genus in the subfamily Sparinae, but the 5th edition of Fishes of the World does not recognise subfamilies within the Sparidae.

== Etymology ==
Rhabdosargus niger belongs to the genus Rhabdosargus, a name which is a refixes rhabdos, meaning "stick" or "rod", an allusion to the yellow abdominal band of Sargus auriventris, its type species, to Sargos, a name used for Sparid fish in ancient Greek at least as long ago as Aristotle but in this case is a reference to Sargus as a synonym of Diplodus. The specific name, niger, means "black", an allusion to the blackish colour of the body.

== Description ==
Rhabdosargus niger has the dorsal fin supported by 11 spines and 13 soft rays while the anal fin contains 3 spines and 11 soft rays. The head and body are silvery-black in colour with no golden horizontal lines on the body. The pelvic and anal fins are dusky grey. This is the smallest of the species in the genus Rhabdosargus with a maximum published standard length of 28.9 cm (11.4 in).

== Distribution ==
Rhabdosargus niger is known only from the type specimens and the precise location at which these were captured is not known, it was somewhere of the western coast of Kalimantan, Indonesia.
