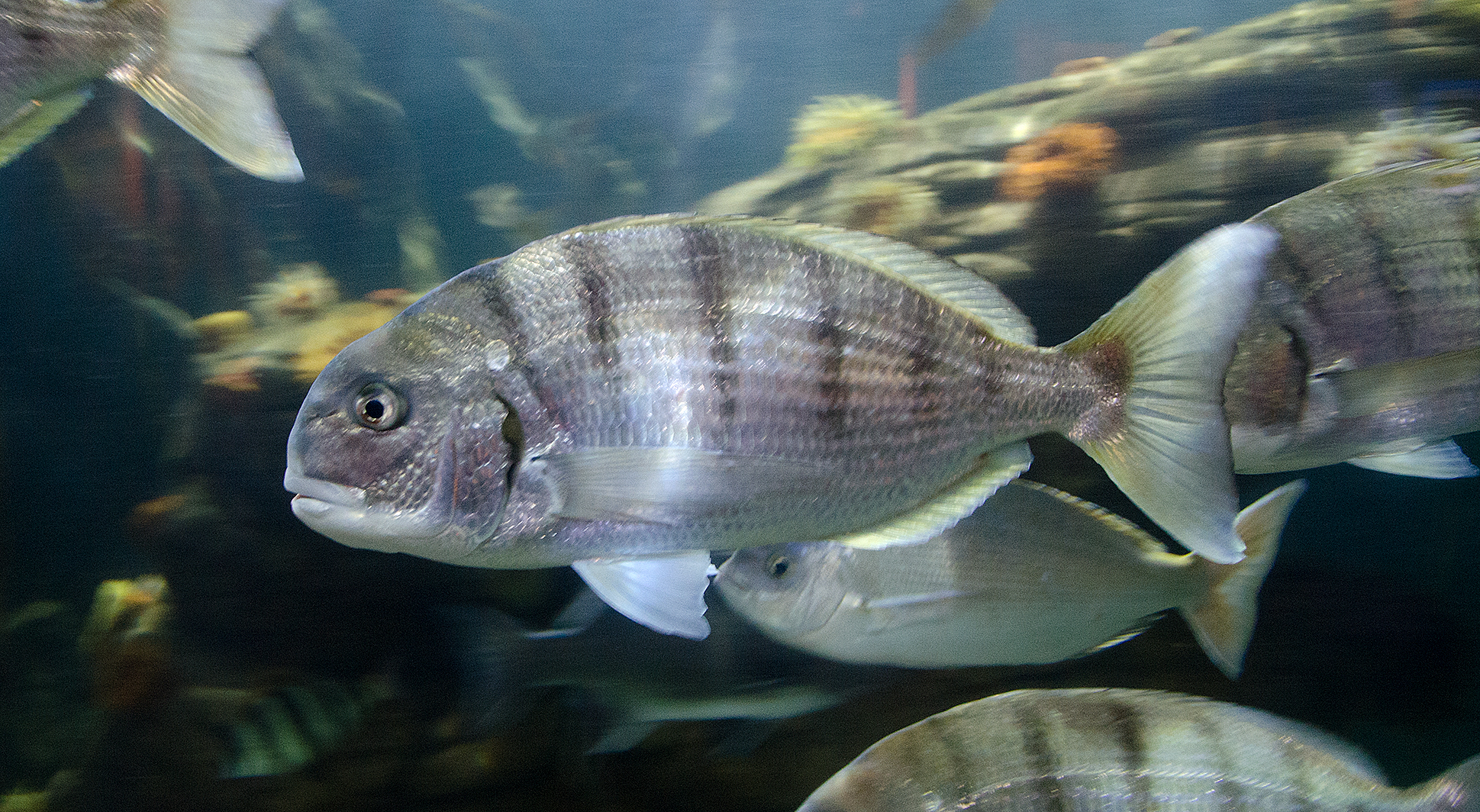

Conservation status
- Vulnerable (IUCN 3.1)

Scientific classification
- Kingdom: Animalia
- Phylum: Chordata
- Class: Actinopterygii
- Order: Acanthuriformes
- Family: Sparidae
- Genus: Rhabdosargus
- Species: R. globiceps

Binomial name
- Rhabdosargus globiceps (Valenciennes, 1830)

Synonyms
- Chrysophrys globiceps Valenciennes, 1830; Austrosparus globiceps (Valenciennes, 1830); Sargus natalensis Steindachner, 1861; Sargus nigrofasciatus Regan, 1908

= Rhabdosargus globiceps =

Species of fish

Rhabdosargus globiceps, the white stumpnose or go-home fish, is a species of marine ray-finned fish belonging to the family Sparidae, which includes the seabreams and porgies. This fish is endemic to the waters off Southern Africa.

== Taxonomy ==
Rhabdosargus globiceps was first formally described in 1830 as Chrysophrys globiceps by the French zoologist Achille Valenciennes with its type locality given as the Cape of Good Hope in South Africa. The genus Rhabdosargus is placed in the family Sparidae within the order Spariformes by the 5th edition of Fishes of the World. Some authorities classify this genus in the subfamily Sparinae, but the 5th edition of Fishes of the World does not recognise subfamilies within the Sparidae.

== Etymology ==
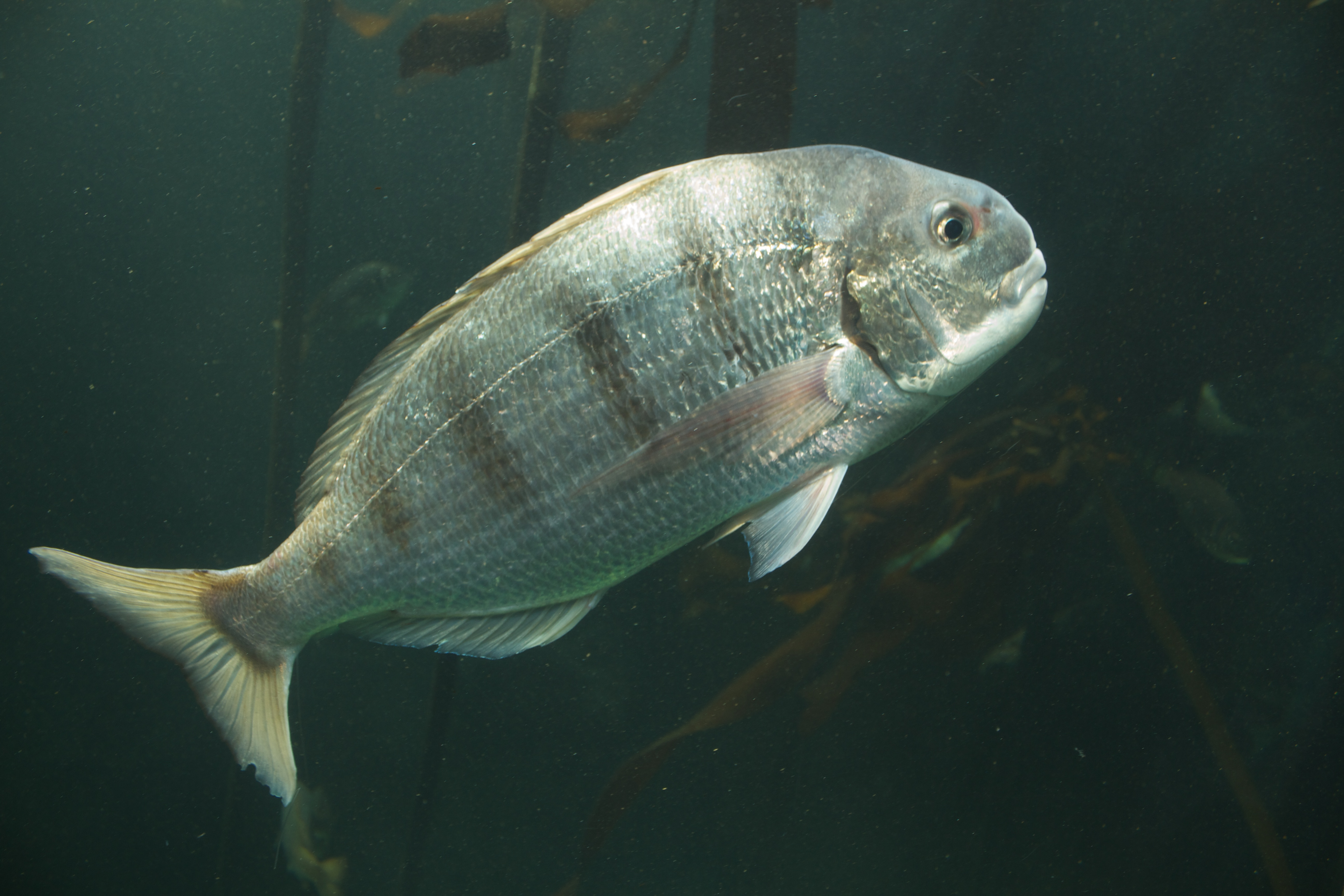
In South Africa

Rhabdosargus globiceps has the generic name Rhabdosargus which is a combination of rhabdos, meaning "stick" or "rod", an allusion to the yellow abdominal band of Sargus auriventris, the type species of the genus. The second part is Sargos, a name used for Sparid fish in ancient Greek at least as long ago as Aristotle but in this case is a reference to Sargus as a synonym of Diplodus. The specific name, globiceps, combines globus, meaning "sphere", and ceps, meaning "head", an allusion to the protuberance between the yes of this species.

== Description ==
Rhabdosargus globiceps has 11 spines and between 11 and 13 spines supporting the dorsal fin while the anal fin is supported by 3 spines and 10 or 11 soft rays. The body is compressed and moderately deep, its depth fitting into its standard length between 2.2 and 2.4 times. The dorsal profile of the head is quite steep, with a bulge in front of the eyes, and then smoothly rounded to the origin of the dorsal fin. The flange on the preoperculum is scaleless. The overall colour of the body is silvery with 5 or 6 dark, vertical bars along the back. with dusky fins. This species has a maximum published total length of 60 cm (24 in), although 40 cm (16 in) is more typical.

== Distribution and habitat ==
Rhabdosargus globiceps is endemic to Southern Africa where it is found in the southeastern Atlantic from Angola south to the Western Cape east into the southwestern Indian Ocean where it reaches as far north as KwaZulu-Natal. The white stumpnose is found over sandy substrates, the juveniles are found in estuaries while the adults can be found as deep as 120 m (390 ft).

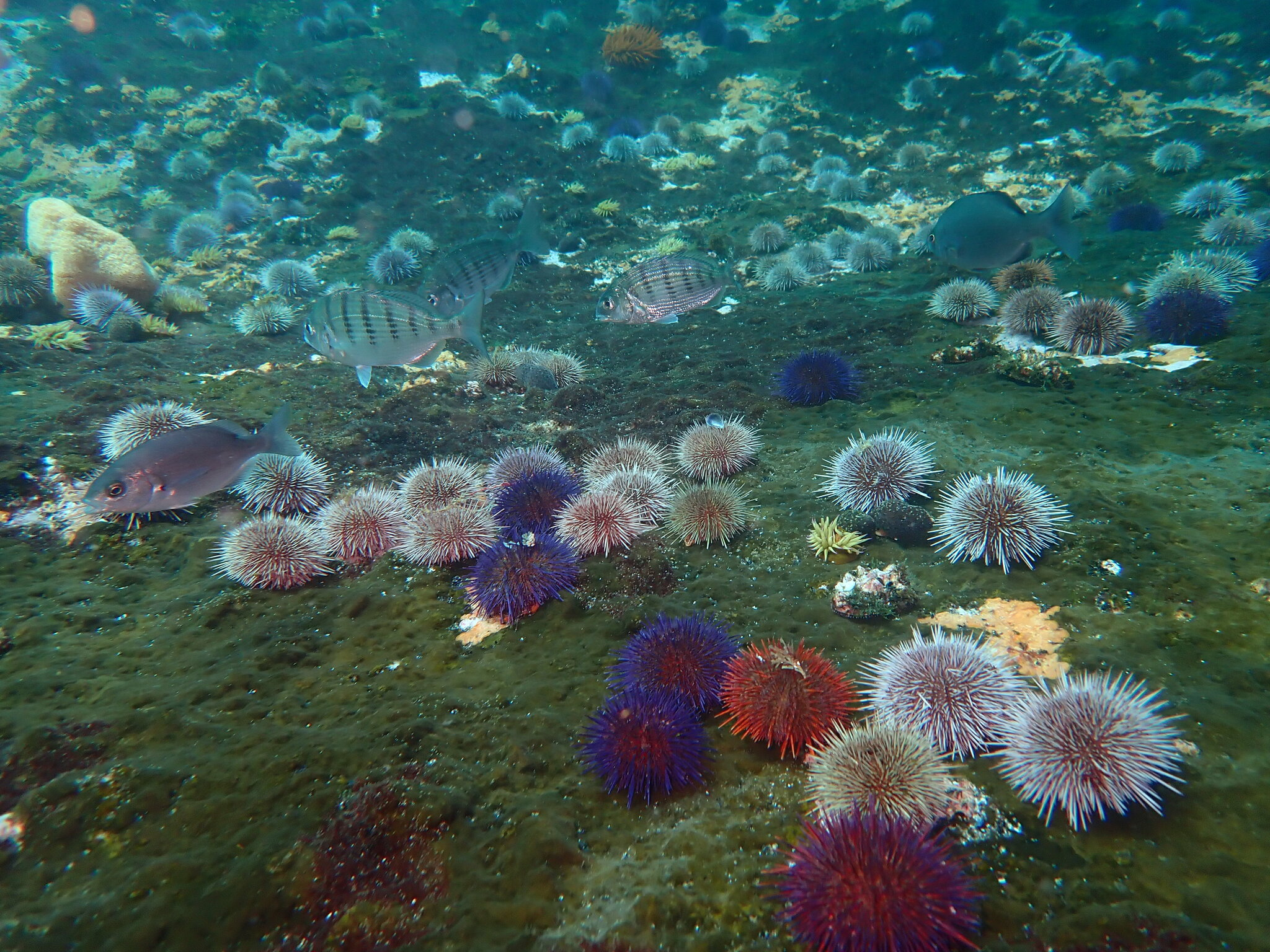
In South Africa

== Biology ==
Rhabdosargus globiceps are found on shallow reefs down to depths of 50 m (160 ft) in the summer while in the winter, at Agulhas Bank they are found in waters as deep as 120 m (390 ft) on reefs and loose sediments. The juvenile fish are common in inshore waters of estuaries and bays where they may be found in the surf zone, in seagrass beds and in coastal lagoons. There is a subpopulation of the white stumpnose in the Langebaan Lagoon on the Atlantic coast of the Western Cape and these fishes are found in tidal channels and over sandy substrates. The adults in this subpopulation disperse offshore during the winter and in summer they concentrate in areas of less than 60 m (200 ft) depth, responding to oceanographic conditions of the summer. Tagging studies have shown that this population is rather mobile, spending midwinter in Saldanha Bay and the rest of the year in the Langebaan Lagoon where they are rather sedentary but will commute daily to preferred sites. This fish is predatory, feeding largely on crustaceans and molluscs with the larger adults being able to crush clams, mussels and snails while the juveniles feed on amphipods, isopods, ostracods and filamentous algae. The longest this fish is known to have lived is 21 years.

The white stumpnose is a rudimentary hermaphrodite, with less than 1% of individuals hiving both ovaries and testes. They spawn between September and March and sexual maturity occurs at around 1.5 to 3 years old and fork lengths of 15.3 cm (6.0 in) to 23.6 cm (9.3 in) for males and 22.2 cm (8.7 in) for females.

== Fisheries and conservation ==
Rhabdosargus globiceps is an economically important species, large numbers are caught by net fishers and anglers in the Cape of Good Hope region, often catching the fish inshore at night. It is also a sought-after sporting fish for recreational fishers using light tackle. It is taken as bycatch by trawlers and beach seine fishers. In some areas where it was caught by beach seiners the stock has collapsed. As the population of this species has declined by more than 30% over 3 generations the International Union for Conservation of Nature has classified this species as Vulnerable. In South Africa minimum sizes and bag limits have been imposed and there are Marine protected areas which protect this fish, including the West Coast National Park which contains Langebaan Lagoon.

== Sources ==
- Sea Fishes of Southern Africa. Rudy van der Elst & Dennis King. 2006. ISBN 978-1-77007-345-6.
- Gids tot die kusgebiede van Suid-Afrika. Jacana Media. 2007. ISBN 978-1-77009-215-0.
- Coastal Fishes of Southern Africa. Phil & Elaine Heemstra. 2004. ISBN 1-920033-01-7
