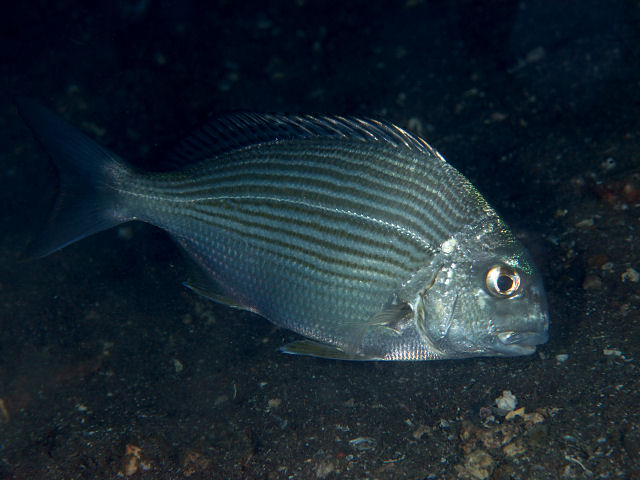
- Rhabdosargus sarba

Scientific classification
- Kingdom: Animalia
- Phylum: Chordata
- Class: Actinopterygii
- Order: Acanthuriformes
- Family: Sparidae
- Genus: Rhabdosargus; Fowler, 1933

Type species
- Sargus auriventris Peters, 1855

Synonyms
- Austrosparus J. L. B. Smith, 1938; Prionosparus J. L. B. Smith, 1942

= Rhabdosargus =

Genus of fishes

Rhabdosargus is a genus of ray-finned fish belonging to the family Sparidae, which includes the seabreams and porgies. These fishes are found in the southeastern Atlantic Ocean and throughout the Indo-West Pacific, although mainly in the western Indian Ocean.

== Taxonomy ==
Rhabdosargus was first proposed as a monospecific genus in 1933 by the American zoologist Henry Weed Fowler with Sparus auriventris as its only species and designated as its type species. Sargus auriventris had been first formally described in 1855 by Wilhelm Peters from Mozambique. S. auriventris is considered to be a junior synonym of Sparus sarba which had been described in 1789 by Johann Friedrich Gmelin from notes written by Peter Forsskål. The genus Rhabdosargus is placed in the family Sparidae within the order Spariformes by the 5th edition of Fishes of the World. Some authorities classify this genus in the subfamily Sparinae, but the 5th edition of Fishes of the World does not recognise subfamilies within the Sparidae.

== Etymology ==
Rhabdosargus is a combination of rhabdos, meaning "stick" or "rod", an allusion to the yellow abdominal band of Sargus auriventris, the type species. The second part is Sargos, a name used for Sparid fish in ancient Greek at least as long ago as Aristotle but in this case is a reference to Sargus as a synonym of Diplodus.

== Species ==
Rhabdosargus contains the following 6 valid species:

- Rhabdosargus globiceps Valenciennes, 1830 (White stumpnose)
- Rhabdosargus haffara Fabricius, 1775 (Haffara seabream)
- Rhabdosargus holubi Steindachner, 1881 (Cape stumpnose)
- Rhabdosargus niger F. Tanaka & Iwatsuki, 2013 (Blackish stumpnose)
- Rhabdosargus sarba Gmelin (ex Forsskål), 1789 (Goldlined seabream)
- Rhabdosargus thorpei M. M. Smith, 1979 (Bigeye stumpnose)

== Characteristics ==
Rhabdosargus seabreams are characterised by having more than 50 scales in the lateral line. The jaws have between 4 and six similarly sized incisor-like teeth as the front with no more than 3 rows of molars to the rear of them which become increasing trapezoid towards the rear of the jaws. The area between the eyes, the soft rayed part s of both the dorsal and anal fins are naked and the flange of the preoperculum are all scaleless, although the preopercular flange may have a few scales on it. The goldined seabream (R. sarba) is the largest species in the genus with a maximum published total length of 80 cm (31 in) while with a maximum published standard length of 28.9 cm (11.4 in) the blackish stumpnose (R. niger) is the smallest.

== Distribution and habitat ==
Rhabdosargus seabreams are found in the southeastern Atlantic Ocean and in the Indian Ocean and the western Pacific Ocean. They are found in coastal waters, often over sand substrates with the juveniles often using estuaries as nursery areas.
