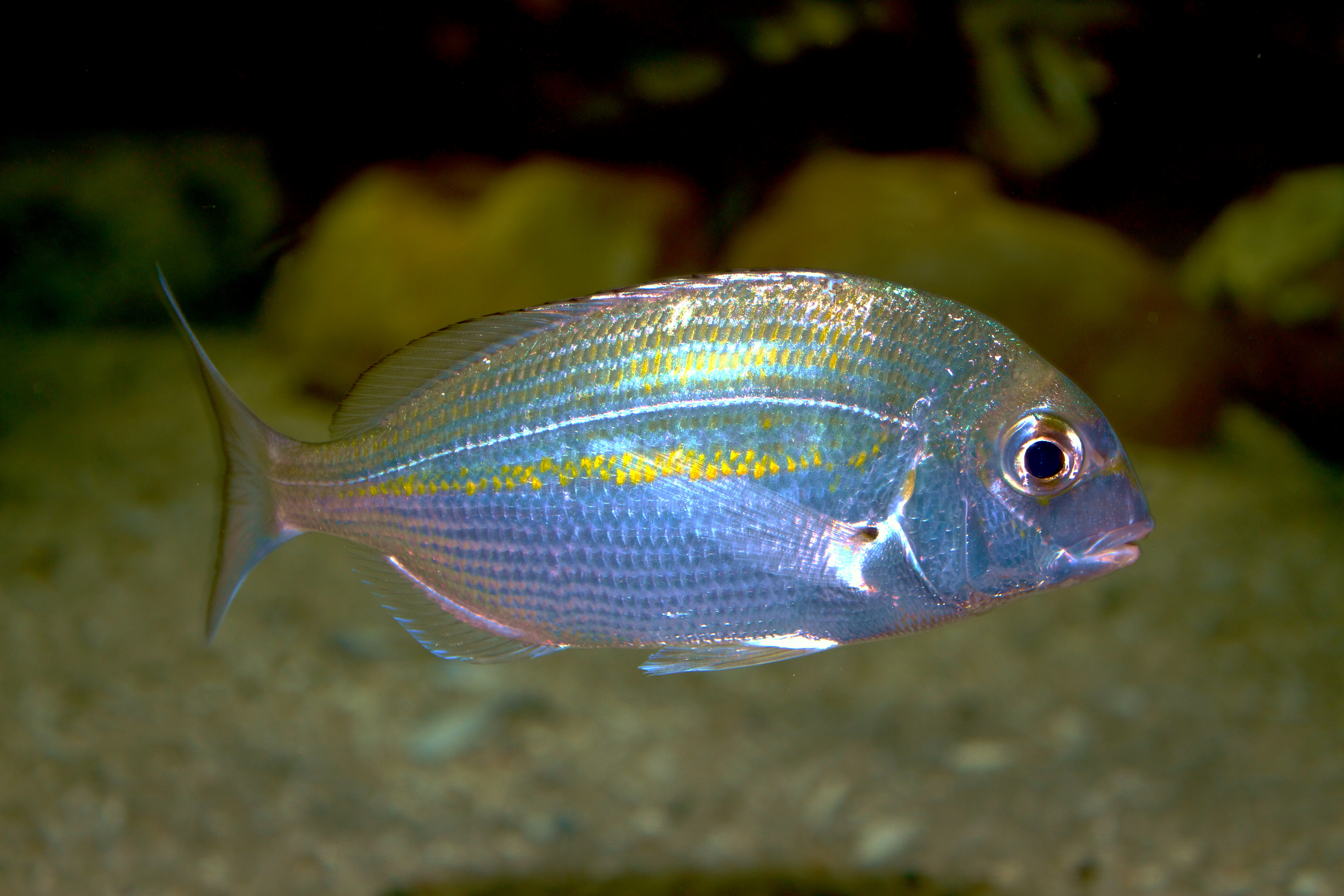

Conservation status
- Least Concern (IUCN 3.1)

Scientific classification
- Kingdom: Animalia
- Phylum: Chordata
- Class: Actinopterygii
- Division: Teleostei
- Order: Acanthuriformes
- Family: Sparidae
- Genus: Rhabdosargus
- Species: R. holubi

Binomial name
- Rhabdosargus holubi (Steindachner, 1881)

Synonyms
- Sargus holubi Steindachner, 1881; Austrosparus tricuspidens J. L. B. Smith, 1942; Rhabdosargus tricuspidens (J. L. B. Smith, 1942)

= Rhabdosargus holubi =

Species of fish

Rhabdosargus holubi, the Cape stumpnose, is a species of fish in the seabream family, Sparidae. It is native to southern Africa, where it can be found mainly along the eastern coast of South Africa.

== Taxonomy ==
Rhabdosargus holubi was first formally described as Sargus holubi by the Austrian ichthyologist Franz Steindachner with its type locality given as Algoa Bay in South Africa. The genus Rhabdosargus is placed in the family Sparidae within the order Spariformes by the 5th edition of Fishes of the World. Some authorities classify this genus in the subfamily Sparinae, but the 5th edition of Fishes of the World does not recognise subfamilies within the Sparidae.

== Etymology ==
Rhabdosargus holubi belongs to the genus Rhabdosargus, a name which is a refixes rhabdos, meaning "stick" or "rod", an allusion to the yellow abdominal band of Sargus auriventris, its type species, to Sargos, a name used for Sparid fish in ancient Greek at least as long ago as Aristotle but in this case is a reference to Sargus as a synonym of Diplodus. The specific name, holubi, honours the collector of the type, Emil Holub who was a Czech medical doctor, cartographer and ethnographer.

== Description ==
Rhabdosargus holubi is usually around 15 cm (5.9 in) long, but specimens of 40 cm (16 in) have been seen. It is a shiny silver fish with a gold line from head to tail. The dorsal fin has 11 spines. The head is blunt and the mouth contains 6 to 8 incisors. The incisors of the juvenile have cusps.

== Biology ==
Rhabdosargus holubi is a marine fish, with adults mainly living in the ocean and juveniles developing in estuaries. The juveniles migrate into the estuaries and generally spend their first year of life there. Some adults can be found in estuaries, as well. Many estuaries of the southeastern African coast are not permanently open, but become blocked by shoals built up by tides and wind. They open for short periods after rainfall causes the rivers to rise and flow into the sea. At this time the fish enter the estuaries and are contained when they close again. Within the estuary, the juveniles dwell in eelgrass beds, a habitat where they find protection and a food supply.

The fish feeds during the day. The diet of the adult is made up of bivalves and crustaceans. The juvenile grazes on vegetation. Its cusped teeth help it collect aquatic plant matter. The most commonly consumed plant is the eelgrass Zostera capensis (syn. Nanozostera capensis). It does not digest the plants, however. It digests the minute life forms stuck to them, such as diatoms, bryozoans, amphipods, and polychaetes. Diatoms, for example may make up 50% of the dry weight of the matter the fish consumes. After absorbing the useful food items the fish excretes the indigestible plant matter.

== Distribution ==
Rhabdosargus holubi is a common fish in its range, one of the most abundant in some areas. It inhabits estuaries such as the Kowie, the Msikaba, the West Kleinemond, the Kasouga, the Swartkops, and the Kromme.

== Utilisation ==
Rhabdosargus holubi is, according to some sources, a desirable food fish, others report that fishermen are not interested in it because it is too small.
