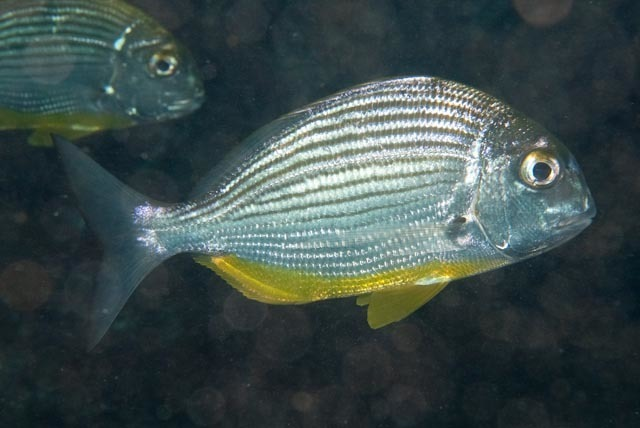

Conservation status
- Least Concern (IUCN 3.1)

Scientific classification
- Kingdom: Animalia
- Phylum: Chordata
- Class: Actinopterygii
- Order: Acanthuriformes
- Family: Sparidae
- Genus: Rhabdosargus
- Species: R. thorpei

Binomial name
- Rhabdosargus thorpei M. M. Smith, 1979

= Rhabdosargus thorpei =

Species of fish

Rhabdosargus thorpei, the bigeye stumpnose, is a species of marine ray-finned fish belonging to the family Sparidae, which includes the seabreams and porgies. The bigeye stumpnose is endemic to the southwestern Indian Ocean.

== Taxonomy ==
Rhabdosargus thorpei was first formally described in 1979 by the South African ichthyologist Margaret Mary Smith with its type locality given as Mabibi in KwaZulu-Natal. The genus Rhabdosargus is placed in the family Sparidae within the order Spariformes by the 5th edition of Fishes of the World. Some authorities classify this genus in the subfamily Sparinae, but the 5th edition of Fishes of the World does not recognise subfamilies within the Sparidae.

== Etymology ==
Rhabdosargus thorpei belongs to the genus Rhabdosargus, a name which is a refixes rhabdos, meaning "stick" or "rod", an allusion to the yellow abdominal band of Sargus auriventris, its type species, to Sargos, a name used for Sparid fish in ancient Greek at least as long ago as Aristotle but in this case is a reference to Sargus as a synonym of Diplodus. The specific name, thorpei, honours Anthony R. Thorpe, a lawyer and the Records Officer of the South African Angling Union, Thorpe caught the Type specimen and drew Smith's attention to it.

== Description ==
Rhabdosargus thorpei has 11 spines and 13 soft rays supporting the dorsal fin while the anal fin contains 3 spines and 12 soft rays. The moderately deep, compressed body has a depth that fits into its standard length 1.9 to 2.1 times. The dorsal profile of the head is smoothly convex to the origin of the dorsal fin, except for a bulge in front of the relatively large eyes. The overall colour of the body is silvery bluish, with yellow tints and yellow lines running along the scale rows. The breast and belly between the pectoral fins and the anal fin is yellow. This species has a maximum published total length of 40 cm (16 in), although 30 cm (12 in) is more typical, with a maximum weight of 4 kg (8.8 lb), although 2 kg (4.4 lb) is more typical.

== Distribution and habitat ==
Rhabdosargus thorpei is endemic to the southwestern Indian Ocean where it is found along the southeastern African coast between the Eastern Cape and southern Mozambique, possible as far north as Xai-Xai, off Europa Island in the Mozambique Channel and around southern Madagascar. The bigeye stumpnose is mainly taken in inshore waters in the surf zone and where there are shallow rocky and coral reefs. It can be found as deep as around 70 m (230 ft). The juveniles shoal in subtropical estuaries which they use as nursery areas.

== Biology ==
Rhabdosargus thorpei has a diet that consists largely of molluscs and crustaceans.
