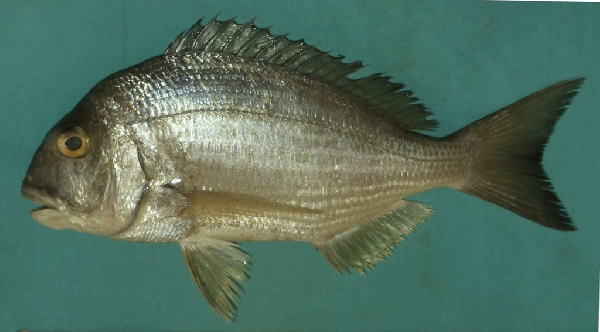

Conservation status
- Least Concern (IUCN 3.1)

Scientific classification
- Kingdom: Animalia
- Phylum: Chordata
- Class: Actinopterygii
- Division: Teleostei
- Order: Acanthuriformes
- Family: Sparidae
- Genus: Rhabdosargus
- Species: R. haffara

Binomial name
- Rhabdosargus haffara (Fabricius, 1775)

Synonyms
- Sparus haffara Fabricius, 1775; Pagrus haffara (Fabricius, 1775)

= Rhabdosargus haffara =

Species of fish

Rhabdosargus haffara, the haffara seabream or Haffara stumpnose, is a species of marine ray-finned fish belonging to the family Sparidae, which includes the seabreams and porgies. This fish is found in the northwestern Indian Ocean.

== Taxonomy ==
Rhabdosargus haffara was first formally described in 1775 by the Danish zoologist Johan Christian Fabricius with no type locality given, although it is thought to be the Red Sea. Fabricius based his description on notes written by Peter Forsskål. The genus Rhabdosargus is placed in the family Sparidae within the order Spariformes by the 5th edition of Fishes of the World. Some authorities classify this genus in the subfamily Sparinae, but the 5th edition of Fishes of the World does not recognise subfamilies within the Sparidae.

== Etymology ==
Rhabdosargus haffara belongs to the genus Rhabdosargus, a name which is a refixes rhabdos, meaning "stick" or "rod", an allusion to the yellow abdominal band of Sargus auriventris, its type species, to Sargos, a name used for Sparid fish in ancient Greek at least as long ago as Aristotle but in this case is a reference to Sargus as a synonym of Diplodus. The specific name, haffara, is the Arabic name for this species in the Red Sea.

== Description ==
Rhabdosargus haffara has an oval, compressed deep body in which the depth fits into the standard length between 2.5 and 3 times. The large head has a convex dorsal profile, strongest at the level of the eyes. The dorsal fin is supported by 11 or 12 spines and between 11 and 14 soft rays while there are 3 spines and 10 or 11 soft rays supporting the anal fin. The flange of the preoperculum has no scales. The overall colour of the body is silvery grey with golden or bluish tints on the upper body. There is a dark spot at the front end of the lateral line and another at the origin of the pectoral fin. The fins are translucent and pinkish in colour. This species has a maximum published total length of 35 cm (14 in), although 20 cm (7.9 in) is more typical.

== Distribution and habitat ==
Rhabdosargus haffara is found in the northwestern Indian Ocean in the Red Sea and in the southern Persian Gulf. It has been recorded in the Mediterranean Sea off Israel, presumed to have been a Lessepsian migrant, although it does not seem to have become established there. It is found at depths greater than 10 m (33 ft) around coral reefs and in areas of sand or sand-mud substrates.

== Biology ==
Rhabdosargus haffara uses its molar-like teeth to crush hard shelled prey such as molluscs and crustaceans. It has planktonic eggs and larvae.

== Fisheries ==
Rhabdosargus haffara is frequently abundant in fish markets around the Persian Gulf where it is caught using Gillnetting, seine nets, fish traps and handlines. In the northern Red Sea the haffara seabream is one of the most important species of seabream that is targeted by the commercial fisheries. It has also been used in aquaculture in the Gulf of Suez.
