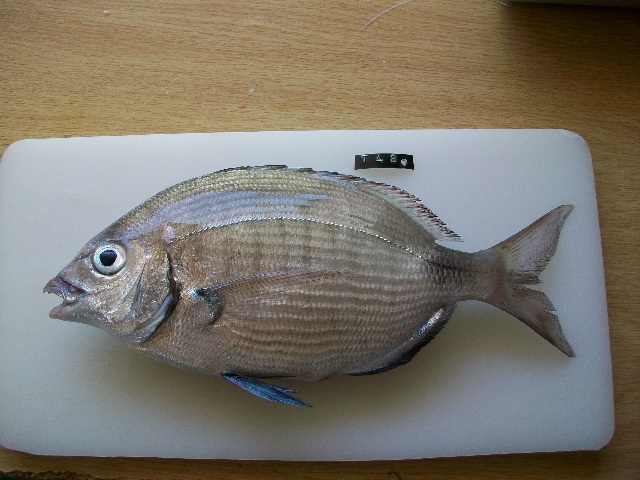

Conservation status
- Least Concern (IUCN 3.1)

Scientific classification
- Kingdom: Animalia
- Phylum: Chordata
- Class: Actinopterygii
- Order: Acanthuriformes
- Family: Sparidae
- Genus: Diplodus
- Species: D. capensis

Binomial name
- Diplodus capensis (A. Smith, 1844)

Synonyms
- Sargus capensis A. Smith, 1844; Diplodus sargus capensis (A. Smith, 1844); Diplodus rondeleti capensis (A. Smith, 1944)

= Diplodus capensis =

Species of fish

Diplodus capensis, the Cape white seabream or blacktail seabream, is a species of marine ray-finned fish belonging to the family Sparidae, which includes the seabreams and porgies. This fish is found around the coasts of Southern Africa.

== Taxonomy ==
Diplodus capensis was first formally described as Sparus capensis in 1844 by the Scottish surgeon, explorer, ethnologist and zoologist Andrew Smith with its type locality given as the southeastern coast of South Africa. This taxon was previously considered to be a subspecies of the sargo (D. sargus) but is now considered to be a valid species. There are two disjunct populations of this species, one in southern Angola and Namibia, and the other in southern and eastern South Africa and Mozambique, these may be separate species, in addition, the taxonomic status of the southern Madagascan population also requires study. The genus Diplodus is placed in the family Sparidae within the order Spariformes by the 5th edition of Fishes of the World. Some authorities classify this genus in the subfamily Sparinae, but the 5th edition of Fishes of the World does not recognise subfamilies within the Sparidae.

== Etymology ==
Diplodus capensis has the specific name capensis which means "of the Cape", a reference to its type locality in, what was then, the Cape Colony.

== Description ==
Diplodus capensis has a deep, oval body with a thin lipped, slightly protrusible mouth. There are 8 incisor-like teeth in the front of each jaw with 3 rows of molar-like teeth in the upper and 2 rows in the lower jaw. The dorsal fin is supported by 12 spines and 14 or 15 soft rays while the anal fin is supported by 3 spines and 13 or 14 soft rays. The large adults are a uniform silvery-grey colour with a large saddle-shaped black blotch on the caudal peduncle while the juveniles are marked with indistinct vertical bars. The maximum published total length for this species is 45 cm (18 in), although 30 cm (12 in) is more typical.

== Distribution and habitat ==
Diplodus capensis is endemic to the waters off Southern Africa in both the southeastern Atlantic and southwestern Indian Oceans. It has a disjunct distribution with one population occurring southern Angola and Namibia and the other from Cape Point east and north to southern Mozambique. It is also found off southern Madagascar and has been reported from Mauritius. This species occurs at depths between 0 and 50 m (0 and 164 ft), the adults are found over sandy and rocky substrates in shallow water while the juveniles are found on shallow reefs, at the mouths of estuaries, in tidal pools and in the surf zone on sandy beaches.

== Biology ==
Diplodus capensis is an omnivore that feeds on seaweed, sponges and bivalves, as well as crustaceans, polychaetes and other molluscs. This species is a group spawner in which the males and females gather into a small group of between 8 and 15 fishes before swimming rapidly in a ball close to the surface and releasing their eggs and milt into the water column at the same time. In KwaZulu-Natal spawining takes place from June until September while in the Eastern Cape it runs from August up to March, peaking in September to December. These fishes spawn on inshore reefs at less than 30 m (98 ft) in depth. The Cape white seabream is a digynous hermaphrodite with some males in the population being partial protandrists.

== Fisheries ==
Diplodus capensis is a target for both the recreational and subsistence, hook and line shore fisheries all along the eastern coast of South Africa and Mozambique and it is regarded as the third most frequently caught shore angling species. It is also rarely caught by spear fishers but is typically regarded as too small. In South Africa the Cape white bream is a "no-sale recreational" only species which commercial fisheries may not target. In any case the flesh of this species is not highly regarded as a food fish.
