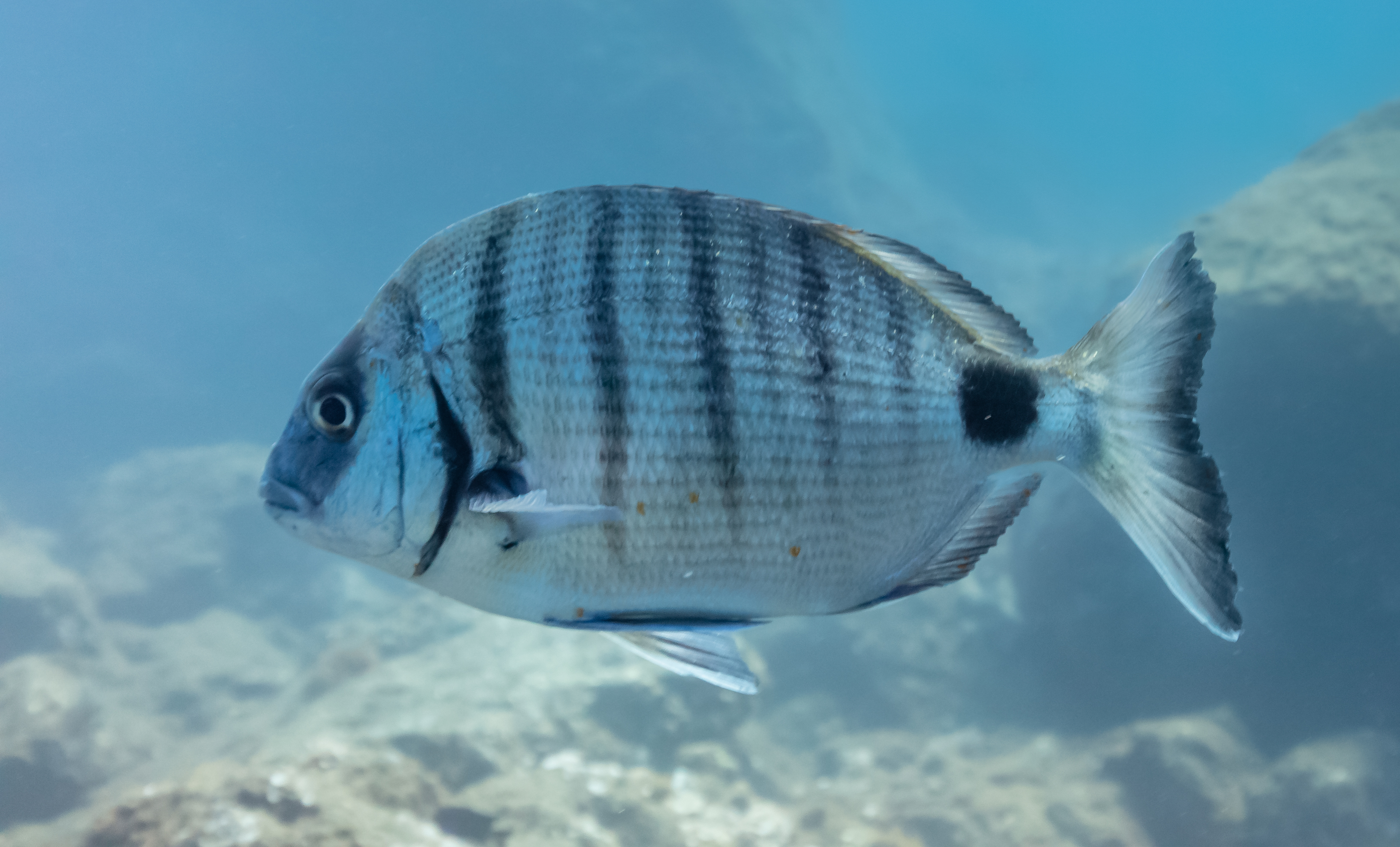

Conservation status
- Least Concern (IUCN 3.1)

Scientific classification
- Kingdom: Animalia
- Phylum: Chordata
- Class: Actinopterygii
- Division: Teleostei
- Order: Acanthuriformes
- Family: Sparidae
- Genus: Diplodus
- Species: D. sargus

Binomial name
- Diplodus sargus (Linnaeus, 1758)
- Range of Diplodus sargus sensu lato

Synonyms
- Sparus sargus Linnaeus, 1758; Diplodus sargus sargus (Linnaeus, 1758); Sparus cinctus Walbaum, 1792; Sargus raucus Geoffroy St. Hilaire, 1809; Sparus varatulus Rafinesque, 1810; Sargus rondeletii Valenciennes, 1830; Sargus vetula Valenciennes, 1830

= Diplodus sargus =

Species of fish

Diplodus sargus, the sargo, common white seabream, or white seabream is a species of marine ray-finned fish belonging to the family Sparidae, which includes the seabreams and porgies. This fish is found in the eastern Atlantic Ocean and in the Mediterranean Sea. It is a target species for commercial fisheries and is grown in aquaculture. D. sargus sensu lato was formerly thought to be a widespread species in the eastern Atlantic and western Indian Oceans but the taxa outside of D, sargus sensu stricto are now recognised as valid species and are part of the D. sargus species complex.

== Taxonomy ==
Diplodus sargus was first formally described as Sparus sargus by Carl Linnaeus in the 10th edition of his Systema naturae published in 1758. Linnaeus gave the type locality as the Mediterranean. D. vulgaris is closely related to D. sargus and these two taxa form a clade within the genus Diplodus. D. sargus was formerly thought to include populations away from the northeastern Atlantic and Mediterranean. These populations have now been recognised as separate species, D. noct in the Red Sea, the Indian Ocean D. kotschyi the eastern Mediterranean D. levantinus and the eastern Atlantic D. ascensionis, the Moroccan seabream D. cadenati, the Cape white seabream D. capensis, the St. Helena white seabream D. helenae and the Cape Verde endemic D. lineatus. Along with D. argenteus, D. bermudensis D. caudimacula and D. holbrooki of the western Atlantic these taxa form the D. sargus species complex with the genus Diplodus. It is thought that the D. sargus species complex originated in the Cape Verde area and radiated and speciated from there.

The genus Diplodus is placed in the family Sparidae within the order Spariformes by the 5th edition of Fishes of the World. Some authorities classify this genus in the subfamily Sparinae, but the 5th edition of Fishes of the World does not recognise subfamilies within the Sparidae.

== Etymology ==
Diplodus sargus has the specific name sargus which is derived from sargo, a Greek name for a sparid fish, which was in use at least as long ago as Aristotle.

== Description ==
Diplodus sargus has a deep, somewhat compressed body with a high, arched back. The cheeks and gill cover are scaled. The mouth is terminal with thin lips and slightly protrusible jaws. At the front of each jaw there are 8, occasionally 10 in the upper jaw, incisor-like teeth with several rows of molar-like teeth behind them. There are 11 or 12 spines, typically 12, and between12 and 16 soft rays supporting the dorsal fin while the anal fin is supported by 3 spines and 12 to 14 soft rays. The caudal fin is forked. The overall colour is silvery-grey, the front of the head being darker. There are 9 vertical bars, these alternate between very dark and lighter bars but there may be only dark bars or none. There is a dark saddle-like blotch on the caudal peduncle, immediately to the rear of the last soft rays of the dorsal fin. There is a black spot above the base of the pectoral fin. The dorsal and anal fins are dusky in colour, darkening towards their far edges. The rear edge of the caudal fin is black. There are only 5 stripes in juveniles. The white seabream has a maximum published total length of 45 cm (18 in), although 22 cm (8.7 in) is more typical, with a maximum published weight of 1.9 kg (4.2 lb).

== Distribution and habitat ==
Duiplodus sargus is found in the northeastern Atlantic from the southern Brittany, the Bay of Biscay and the Atlantic coasts of Spain and Portugal into the Strait of Gibraltar and throughout the Mediterranean and Black Sea. It is replaced off the coast of Israel by D. levantinus. In the eastern Atlantic this species has been moving north and has been recorded in the Channel Islands. The white sea bream is a benthopelagic, schooling species inhabiting coastal areas with rocky bottoms interspersed with sand from 0 to 150 m (0 to 492 ft), being most numerous in the surf zone. The young occur in Zostera beds and this species uses estuaries as nursery areas.

== Biology ==
Diplodus sargus is a daytime active, omnivorous fish which feeds on algae, sea-urchins, worms, gastropods and amphipods. The white seabream has been observed acting as a cleaner fish in on the mullets Thicklip grey mullet (Chelon labrosus) and Flathead grey mullet (Mugil cephalus). White seabream in the Gulf of Tunis spawned from March to May, sexual activity began as the water temperature rose from 15 °C (59 °F) to 18 °C (64 °F), sex organs becoming active after the winter minimum temperature. As latitude decreases, the spawning season lengthens.

== Fisheries and aquaculture ==
Diplodus sargus is commercially fished, with 3,713 tonnes taken in 2008. The white seabream is mostly landed by artisanal fishers and is caught using fish traps, gill nets and handlines. It is caught as bycatch in shrimp trawls. There have been a number of trials to see if this species has potential for aquaculture in the Mediterranean but this has proved to be difficult because this species grows slowly after its first year and this slow growth can impact the profitability of any commercial aquaculture.

Since the 1990s some cooked white seabream is rubbery and inedible, not related freshness or preserving. Researchers refer to this as the abnormally tough specimen (ATS) phenomenon. The cause is unknown but it seems to occur around polluted areas, with the pollutants including copper, used in anti-fouling paints.

== Namesakes ==
Diplodus sargus has the common name sargo in many languages and this name is also used for other food and gamefishes of the porgy family, in the coastal waters of the southern United States, such as the sheepshead (Archosargus probatocephalus).

Two US Navy submarines were named for this nimble fish, USS Sargo (SS-188) and USS Sargo (SSN-583).
