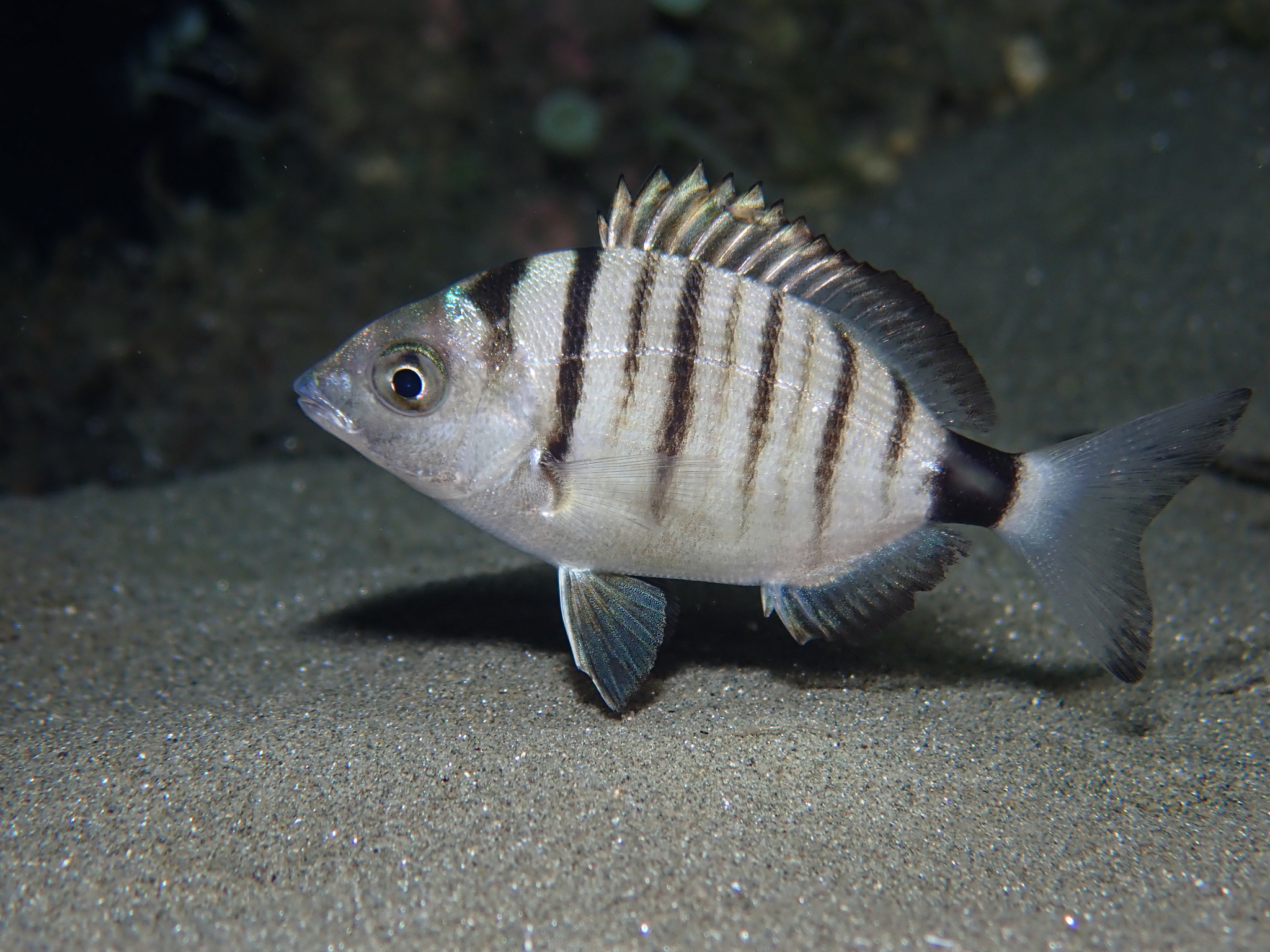

Conservation status
- Least Concern (IUCN 3.1)

Scientific classification
- Kingdom: Animalia
- Phylum: Chordata
- Class: Actinopterygii
- Division: Teleostei
- Order: Acanthuriformes
- Family: Sparidae
- Genus: Diplodus
- Species: D. puntazzo

Binomial name
- Diplodus puntazzo (Walbaum, 1792)

Synonyms
- Sparus puntazzo Walbaum, 1792; Charax puntazzo (Walbaum, 1792); Puntazzo puntazzo (Walbaum, 1792); Sargus puntazzo (Walbaum, 1792); Sparus puntazzo Cetti, 1777; Sparus acutirostris Delaroche, 1809; Sparus oxyrhynchus Nardo, 1827; Charax puntazzo var. ponticus Nordmann, 1840; Puntazzo annularis Bleeker, 1876

= Diplodus puntazzo =

Species of ray-finned fish

Diplodus puntazzo, the sharpsnout seabream, sheephead bream or puntazzo, is a species of marine ray-finned fish belonging to the family Sparidae, which includes the seabreams and porgies. This species is found in the Eastern Atlantic and the Mediterranean and Black Seas. This omnivorous fish is an important species for aquaculture and fisheries, despite the flesh not being highly esteemed.

== Taxonomy ==
Diplodus puntazzo was first formally described as Sparus puntazzo in 1792 by the German naturalist Johann Julius Walbaum with its type locality given as Sardinia. This name was first published by Francesco Cetti in 1777 but this was considered to be a vernacular name and the binomial has been attributed to Walbaum (ex Cetti), 1792, although the name has also been attributed to Gmeilin, 1789. A molecular study recovered D. puntazzo as the sister taxon to saddled seabream (Oblada melanura). The genus Diplodus is placed in the family Sparidae within the order Spariformes by the 5th edition of Fishes of the World. Some authorities classify this genus in the subfamily Sparinae, but the 5th edition of Fishes of the World does not recognise subfamilies within the Sparidae.

== Etymology ==
Diplodus puntazzo has the specific name puntazzo which Cetti reported was the common name for this species in Sardinia.

== Description ==
Diplodus puntazzo has an oval shaped, compressed body with a slightly protrusible mouth which has moderately fleshy lips. There are 8 brown coloured incisor-like teeth in the front of both the upper and lower jaw with 3 or 4 rows of smaller molar-like teeth, although these tend to be lost in adults. The dorsal fin is supported by 11 spines and between 12 and 15 soft rays, while the anal fin contains 3 spines and 11 to 13 soft rays. The caudal fin is forked. The overall colour is silvery grey with 6 or 7 vertical bars along the upper body, these alternate between dark and light coloured bars. These bars may disappear when the fish dies. There is a dark bar on the caudal peduncle, this almost rings the peduncle, darkest in young fish. The outer margin of the caudal fin is black, the remaining finds are greyish, darkening towards their margins. There is a dark spot at the base of the pectoral fin. The sharpsnout seabream has a maximum published total length of 60 cm (24 in), although 30 cm (12 in) is more typical, with a maximum published weight of 1.7 kg (3.7 lb).

== Distribution and habitat ==
Diplodus puntazzo is found in the eastern Atlantic Ocean with its northern most limit in the southern Bay of Biscay off northern Spain, although it is very uncommon in this area, south to Sierra Leone. In Macaronesia it is found only in the Canary Islands and Cape Verde. It also occurs throughout the Mediterranean and southern Black Sea. Claims of the sharpsnout seabream in South Africa are misidentifications. In the Bay of Biscay this species is increasingly being recorded farther north.

The sharpsnout seabream is a benthopelagic fish found in marine and brackish waters at depths down to 150 m (490 ft), although it is typically found in water of less than 60 m (200 ft) in depth. It is found over rock or sand substrates in coastal waters. Younger fish may live in brackish water, tidal pools and lagoons while the adults may occur in the surf zone.

== Biology ==
Diplosus puntazzo is omnivorous, in a study of the diet of fish caught in the Gulf of Gabes plants were found to be the largest proportion, almost 90%, of the diet with fishes and invertebrates being additional components. Off Benghazi in Libya, the proportion of animals in the diet was higher than in the Gulf of Gabes study, with crustaceans and cephalopods dominating the diet, especially in smaller fish with larger fish ingesting more plant material, detritus and crustaceans. Another study in the Adriatic Sea found plants slightly less dominant in the diet of sharpsnout seabream and more animal food eaten. This species has a longer digestive tract than more carnivorous sparids, likely as an aid to digesting less digestible food items such as plants, sponges and formaniferamd. They have also been found to feed on the ectoparasitic copepod of the family Caligidae, suggesting that at least in young fish they behave as cleaner fish. Their omnivory has been looked at as a positive feature for the use of D. puntazzo in aquaculture where, for example, they good be fed on citrus pulp silage. The sharpsnot seabeam is mostly diurnal and most feeding is carried out during the day, although many fish will still move around at night.

The sharpsnout seadrum is a rudimentary hermaphrodite, meaning that they have both male and female reproductive tissue, and in some cases it can be protandrous, i.e. males change into females. The spawning season runs from August or September until November or December, peaking in September or October. The condition of the female gonads during spawning, with developing eggs and postovulatory tissye present at the same time suggest that this species is a batch spawner.es This is a gregarious species which is encountered in schools.

== Utilisation ==
Diplodus puntazzo is fished for semi-industrially off Sicily, although elsewhere in its range it is caught mainly by artisinal fishers, as well as by recreational fishers. In Morocco the fishery is seasonal but in the Canary ISlands it is fished for throughout the year. It is caught by a variety of methods and is found as fresh or frozen fish in markets throughout the Mediterranean, except in France, despite the flesh not being highly esteemed. It is also used in the production of fish meal and oil. The aquaculture of this species is important in the Mediterranean, despite their being large gaps in knowledge about its biology.

== Sources ==
- Amel Belial; Naouel Amel Brahim Tazi; Zakia Hadjou; Zitouni Boutiba (2016). "First records of digenean trematodes of two fishes (Teleostei Sparidae) from the West Algerian coast and comparative study with Tunisian coast (Mediterranean Sea)". Biodiversity Journal. 7 (2): 240.
- Jacques Sardou (March–April 1976). "Sur un exemplaire anormal de Diplodus (Pisces, Sparidae)". Bulletin du Muséum national d'histoire naturelle. Série 3. Zoologie (in French) (376): 471.
- Gregg B. Goodman, ed. (2003). Information resources on the care and use of molluscs (Report). U.S. Dept. of Agriculture, Agriculture Research Service, National Agricultural Library, Animal Welfare Information Center. pp. 78, 120.
- J. M. Falcon; A. Brito; P. Pascual; G. Gonzalez; A. Sancho; M. Cabrera; A. Baez; P. Martin-Sosa; J. Barquin (2002). "CATALOGO DE LOS PECES DE LA RESERVA MARINA DE LA GRACIOSA E ISLOTES AL NORTE DE LANZAROTE. TROPICALIZACION RECIENTE DEL POBLAMIENTO ICTICO". Revista de la Academia Canaria de Ciencias (in Spanish). 14 (3/4): 132.
- J. M. Falcon; A. Brito; G. Gonzalez (2002). "FECES DE LA LAGUNA DE KHNIFISS (SAHARA, NW DE AFRICA) Y DE LOS SECTORES COSTEROS PROXIMOS". Revista de la Academia Canaria de Ciencias (in Spanish). 14 (3/4): 145.
- Espino, F.; Gonzalcz, J. A.; Boyra, A .; Fernandez, C.; Tuya, F.; Brito, A. (2014). "DIVERSITY AND BIOGEOGRAPHY OF FISHES IN THE ARINAGA-GANDO AREA, EAST COAST OF GRAN CANARIA (CANARY ISLANDS)". Revista de la Academia Canaria de Ciencias. 26: 23.
- Margaret M. Smith; Phillip C Heemstra, eds. (1986). Smiths' Sea fishes. Macmillan South Africa. p. 585. ISBN 0-86954-266-4.
