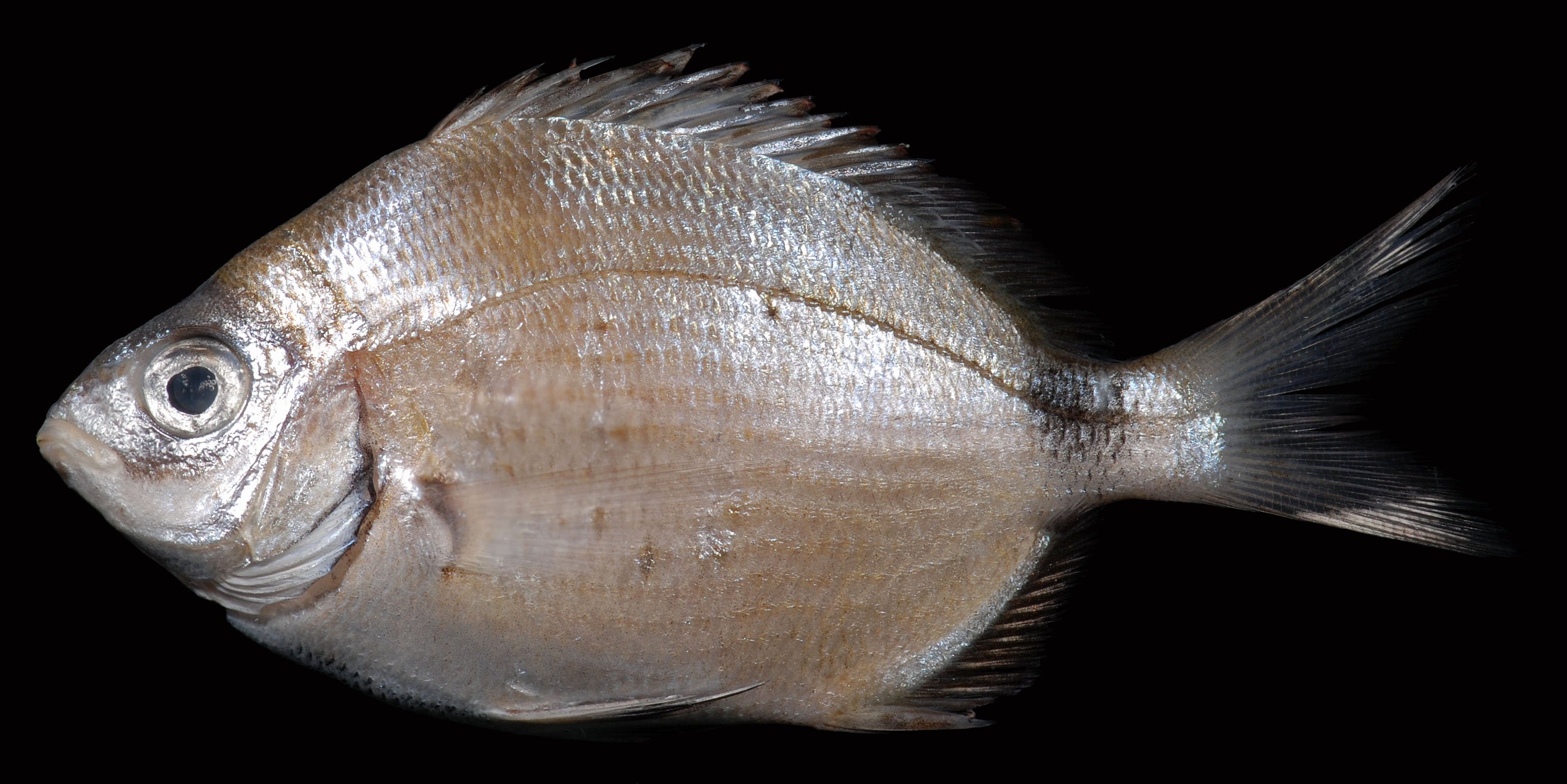

Conservation status
- Least Concern (IUCN 3.1)

Scientific classification
- Kingdom: Animalia
- Phylum: Chordata
- Class: Actinopterygii
- Order: Acanthuriformes
- Family: Sparidae
- Genus: Diplodus
- Species: D. holbrookii

Binomial name
- Diplodus holbrookii (Bean, 1878)

Synonyms
- Sargus holbrookii (Bean, 1878)

= Spottail pinfish =

Species of fish

The spottail pinfish (Diplodus holbrookii) is an ocean-going species of fish in the family Sparidae. It is also known as the spottail seabream or spottail pinkish porgy. Along with other members of their family, spottail pinfish are occasionally eaten and considered by some to be a panfish.

== Taxonomy ==
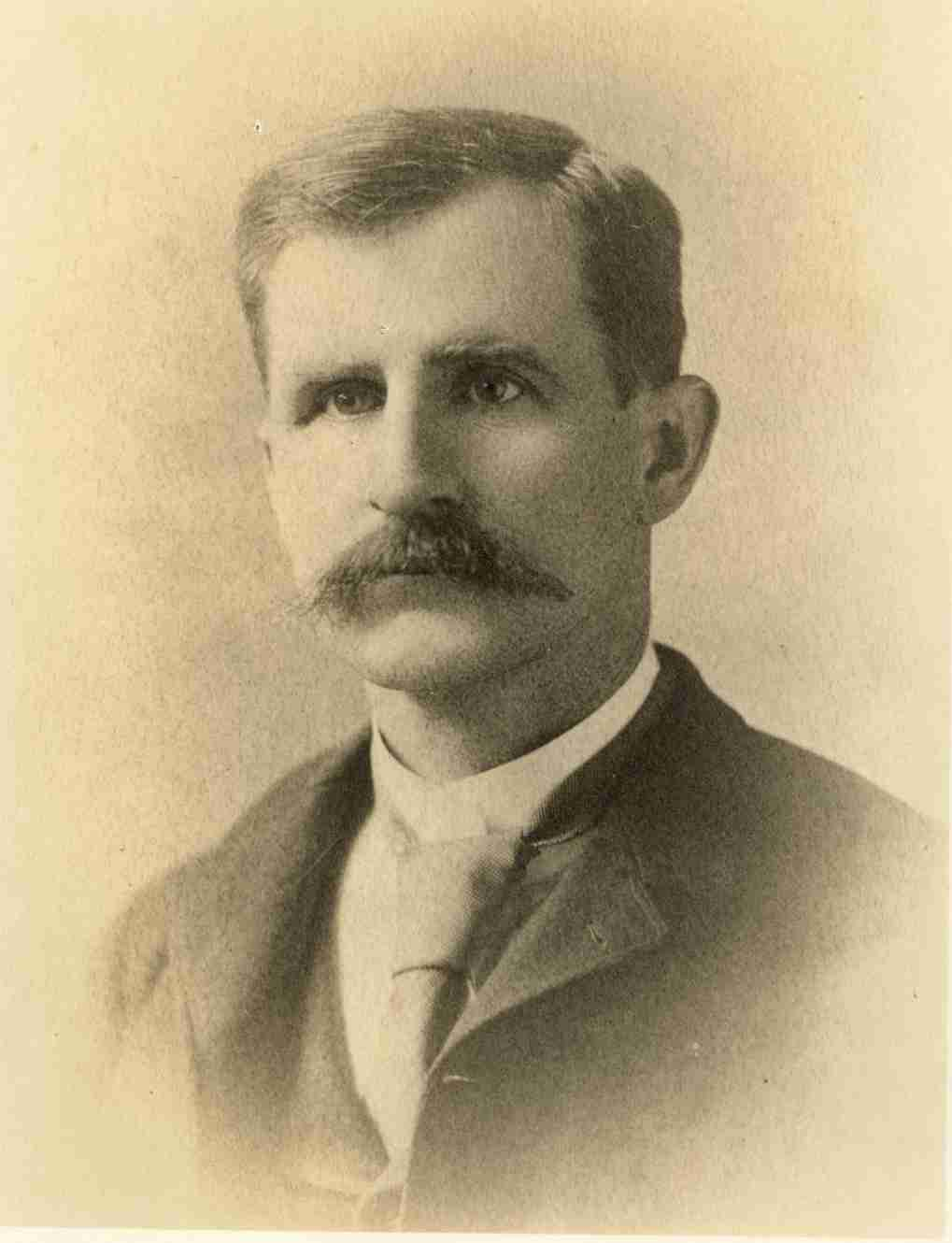
T. H. Bean, who described the Spottail pinfish.

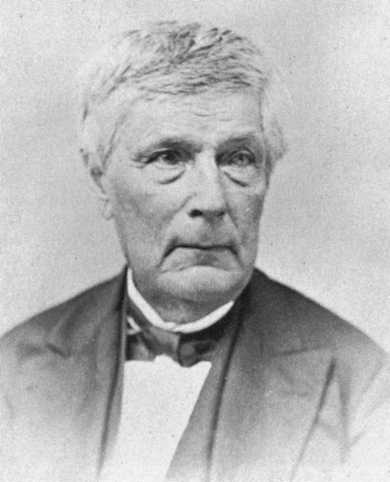
John Holbrook, for whom the Spottail pinfish was named .

The spottail pinfish was first formally described as Sargus holbrookii in 1878 by Tarleton Hoffman Bean with its type locality given as the Savannah Bank off Charleston, South Carolina. This species is part of the Diplodus sargus species complex within the genus Diplodus. The genus Diplodus is placed in the family Sparidae within the order Spariformes by the 5th edition of Fishes of the World. Some authorities classify this genus in the subfamily Sparinae, but the 5th edition of Fishes of the World does not recognize subfamilies within the Sparidae.

== Etymology ==
The spottail pinfish honours the American physician and naturalist John Edwards Holbrook who wrote the Ichthyology of South Carolina published in 1855.

== Description ==
Spottail pinfish have a deep, ovoid, laterally compressed body with a small, deep head and a pointed snout. They have a small mouth which just reaches under the front of the eye. There are six large, flattened incisor-like teeth in the front of each jaw with three rows of molar-like teeth on the sides of the jaws. The dorsal fin is supported by 12 spines, with the fourth spine having a length equivalent to 40% of the length of the head, and between 13 and 16 soft rays. The anal fin contains three spines and between 13 and 15 soft rays. The pectoral fins are much longer than the pelvic fins. The cheeks are scaled but the snout is naked. The upper body is steely blue in color, the flanks are silvery. There is a large black blotch on the caudal peduncle. The membrane of the operculum is dark. Juveniles have dark bars on the body. This species has a maximum published total length of 46 cm (18 in), although 25 cm (9.8 in) is more typical.

== Distribution and habitat ==
Spottail pinfish are exclusive to the western Atlantic Ocean. They can be found from the Chesapeake Bay to southern Florida. Spottail pinfish are also known from the northern Gulf of Mexico, but are not known from the West Indies. There are only questionable reports from Cuba.

Spottail pinfish are common to shallow waters (only as deep as 28 metres or 92 feet) near coasts, such as bays and harbors, though only rarely in brackish areas. They prefer flat, vegetated bottoms such as beds of sea grass, where they feed on a mixture of plants (such as Thalassia) and small invertebrates.

== Behavior ==
Spottail pinfish school in small numbers, but generally mix with many other species such as the porkfish, gray snapper, bluestriped grunt, sailor's grunt, and the bucktooth parrotfish.

This species is thought to spawn offshore, in rather shallow seas, during the winter or early spring. Breeding likely takes place just annually lasting for only around two months. Fish in breeding condition have been measured from 12.9 cm (5.1 in) and the gonads develop in the months leading up to spawning.

== Fisheries ==
Spottail pinfish is caught by commercial fisheries in all areas in which it occurs. The fish landed are usually bycatch and are commonly caught on hook and line and by seine nets, gill nets and shallow water trawling. This species is a bycatch in shrimp trawl fisheries and is a very common bycatch in North Carolina's black sea bass commercial fish trap fishery.
