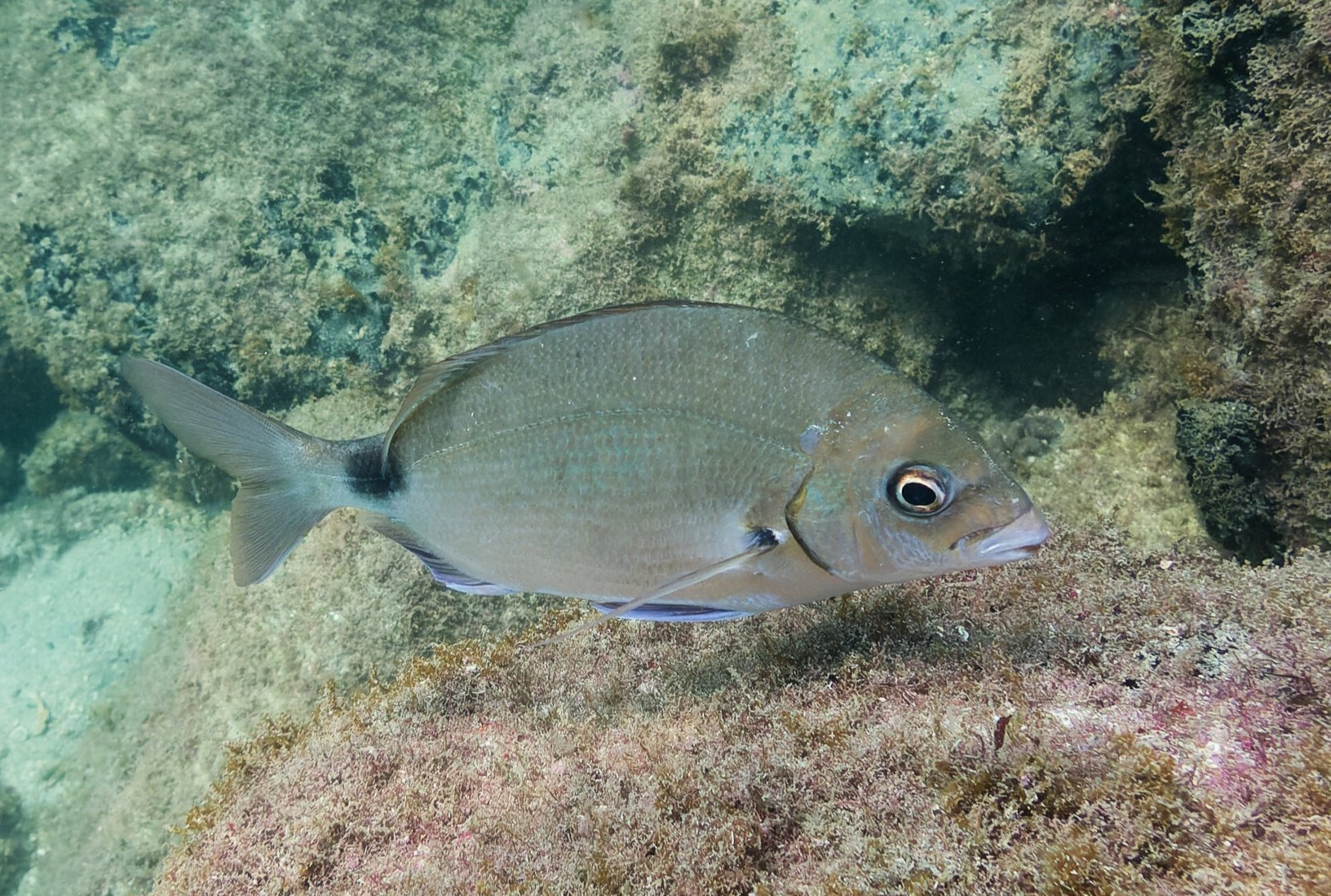
- Diplodus argenteus photographed on a reef near Ilha Grande, Brazil

Conservation status
- Least Concern (IUCN 3.1)

Scientific classification
- Kingdom: Animalia
- Phylum: Chordata
- Class: Actinopterygii
- Order: Acanthuriformes
- Family: Sparidae
- Genus: Diplodus
- Species: D. argenteus

Binomial name
- Diplodus argenteus (Valenciennes, 1830)

Synonyms
- Sargus argenteus Valenciennes, 1830; Sparus sargo Larrañaga, 1923

= Diplodus argenteus =

Species of fish

Diplodus argenteus, the silver porgy, is an ocean-going species of sparid fish (seabream/porgies). It is also called the South American silver porgy and the white bream in Uruguay, plus the silver seabream and the sargo, though the latter three names are also used for other fish species as well.

== Taxonomy and naming ==
The silver porgy was originally described in 1830 by the French zoologist Achille Valenciennes as Sargus argenteus, but it was later moved from the genus Sargus into Diplodus. Another binomial name, Sparus sargo, was erected by Dámaso Antonio Larrañaga in 1923 to describe fishes that are now considered to be silver porgies as well, meaning that Sparus sargo is considered a junior synonym for D. argenteus.

=== Etymology ===
The genus name, Diplodus, means "double toothed", a description which was not well-explained, but may have been done in reference to the species' two types of teeth: incisor-like and molar-like, or to the double incisor-like tooth shape common to this genus. The species name argenteus comes from the Latin word for silver, a reference to the fish's coloration.

== Description ==
As its name suggests, this D. argenteus' silvery coloration (often with a yellowish tint on the scales and fins) is a significant characteristic of its appearance. In addition to its main coloring, there are nine dark, narrow bars that can be faintly visible on the anterior portion of its body (especially in younger individuals, as they fade with age), there is also a large, black blotch on the caudal peduncle, and the opercular membrane is also very dark in color. The silver porgy's dorsal fin is made up of 12 spines, and 13–15 soft rays; it's anal fin consists of only three spines, but 12–14 soft rays. Mature silver porgies achieve about 20–23 cm (7.9–9.1 in) in length, while the maximum known length for this species is 37.8 cm (1.24 ft) in length.

== Distribution and habitat ==
The silver porgy is known primarily from the western Atlantic Ocean, where it can be found in the waters of southern Florida as well as the Antilles and Bahamas. Along the coast of South America, it is known from coasts of Colombia and Venezuela to Argentina – as far south as the coast of northern Patagonia. They are also found in the Bay of Campeche, which is part of the Gulf of Mexico.

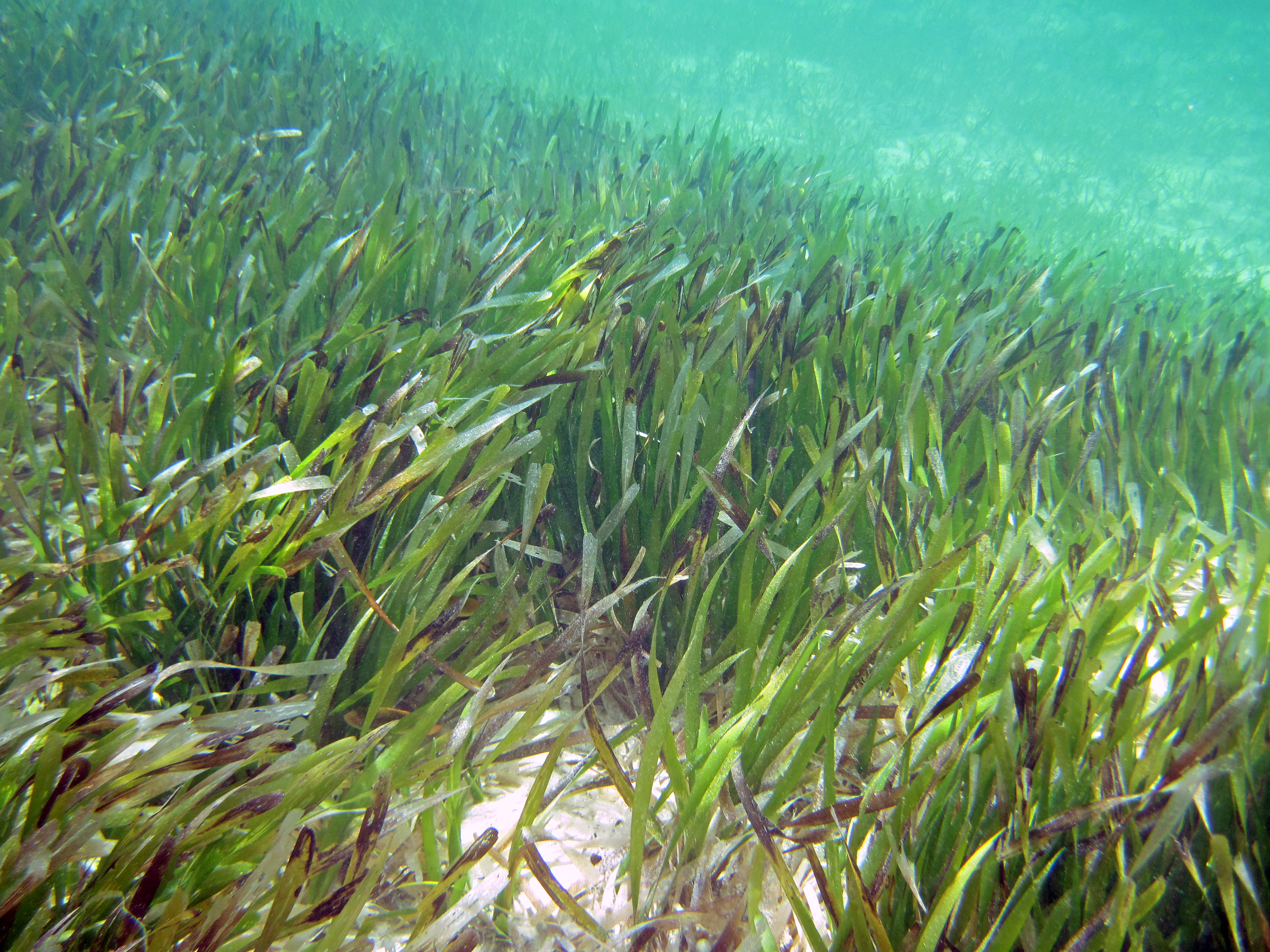
Seagrass beds such as this one in the Caribbean Sea often inhabited by subadult silver porgies.

Adult silver porgies usually inhabit clear but turbulent waters over rocky or coral bottoms, especially on unsheltered coasts that are heavily affected by surf. Juveniles, on the other hand, can be found in much shallower water, such as in pools between rocks, though mid-sized individuals up to 10 cm (3.9 in) can be also found in beds of seagrass from the genus Thalassia.

== Biology ==
Silver porgies eat mostly shellfish especially crustaceans and mollusks, however the remains of algae and polychaete worms have also been found in the stomachs of specimens collected from the Brazilian coast. Variation in diet does occur as the fish grows, mostly in relation to mouth size, as different prey species can only be consumed by individuals large enough to catch them.

=== Relationship with humans ===
The silver porgy is fished commercially, but only traded locally. Able to be caught via angling or through trapping, it makes up a major portion of the catch in the Cabo Frio region of Brazil, but is generally caught incidentally, and is even reported rare from fisheries in other parts of its range such as Cuba. Catches are generally very small and come from Argentina, Brazil, and Uruguay, though fishing for this species off the United States East Coast and Brazil once dominated the silver porgy catch for most of the late-20th century.

Because of its habitat and distribution, this species is often encountered by recreational SCUBA divers and snorklers. Despite its fairly high probability of being encountered in certain ecosystems, the silver porgy seldom approaches divers and generally moves away from them when approached.
