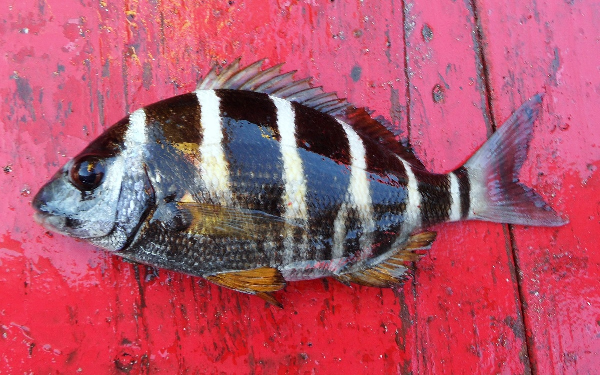

Conservation status
- Least Concern (IUCN 3.1)

Scientific classification
- Kingdom: Animalia
- Phylum: Chordata
- Class: Actinopterygii
- Order: Acanthuriformes
- Family: Sparidae
- Genus: Diplodus
- Species: D. fasciatus

Binomial name
- Diplodus fasciatus (Valenciennes, 1830)

Synonyms
- Sargus fasciatus Valenciennes, 1830

= Banded seabream =

Species of ray-finned fish

The banded seabream (Diplodus fasciatus) is a species of marine ray-finned fish belonging to the family Sparidae, which includes the seabreams and porgies. This species is endemic to Cape Verde in the eastern Atlantic Ocean.

== Taxonomy ==
The banded seabream was first formally described as Sargus fasciatus in 1830 by the French zoologist Achille Valenciennes with its type locality given as the Cape Verde Islands. This species forms a clade within the genus Diplodus with the zebra seabream (D. cervinus) species complex. Diplodus is placed in the family Sparidae within the order Spariformes by the 5th edition of Fishes of the World. Some authorities classify this genus in the subfamily Sparinae, but the 5th edition of Fishes of the World does not recognise subfamilies within the Sparidae.

== Etymology ==
The banded seabream has the specific name fasciatus which means "banded", a reference to the five dark bands on the body which almost encircle it.

== Description ==
The banded seabream has an oval. compressed body with a very thick-lipped slightly protrusible mouth. There are between 10 and 12 incisor-like teeth in the front of the upper jaw with 8 in the lower jaw. Behind these there are between 1 and 3, typically 2, rows of molar-like teeth. The dorsal fin is supported between 10 and 12 spines, increasing in height until the fourth spine, and between 11 and 13 soft rays. The anal fin has 3 spines and between 9 or 10 soft rays supporting it. The tail is forked. The background colour is dark, with the belly being paler in younger fishes, broken by 6 slender pale vertical bars reaching two thirds of the way down the flanks. The rearmost of these is at the caudal fin base. The lips are pink, the pectoral fins are yellow while the rest of the fins are dark yellowish. There is a black bar running between the eyes and on to the snout. The rear margin of the operculum is black. The banded seabream has a maximum published total length of 45 cm (18 in), although 30 cm (12 in) is more typical.

== Distribution and habitat ==
The banded seabream is endemic to Cape Verde in the eastern Atlantic Ocean where it is found as deep as 100 m (330 ft) on rock susbtrates, they may be found at greater depths over sandy substrates.

== Biology ==
The banded seabream is omnivorous with a mostly carnivorous diet, dominated by small invertebrates. It is sometimes encountered in small groups of up to 5 individuals of different sizes.

== Fisheries ==
The banded seabream is fished for using hook and lines throughout Cape Verde where its flesh is highly valued.
