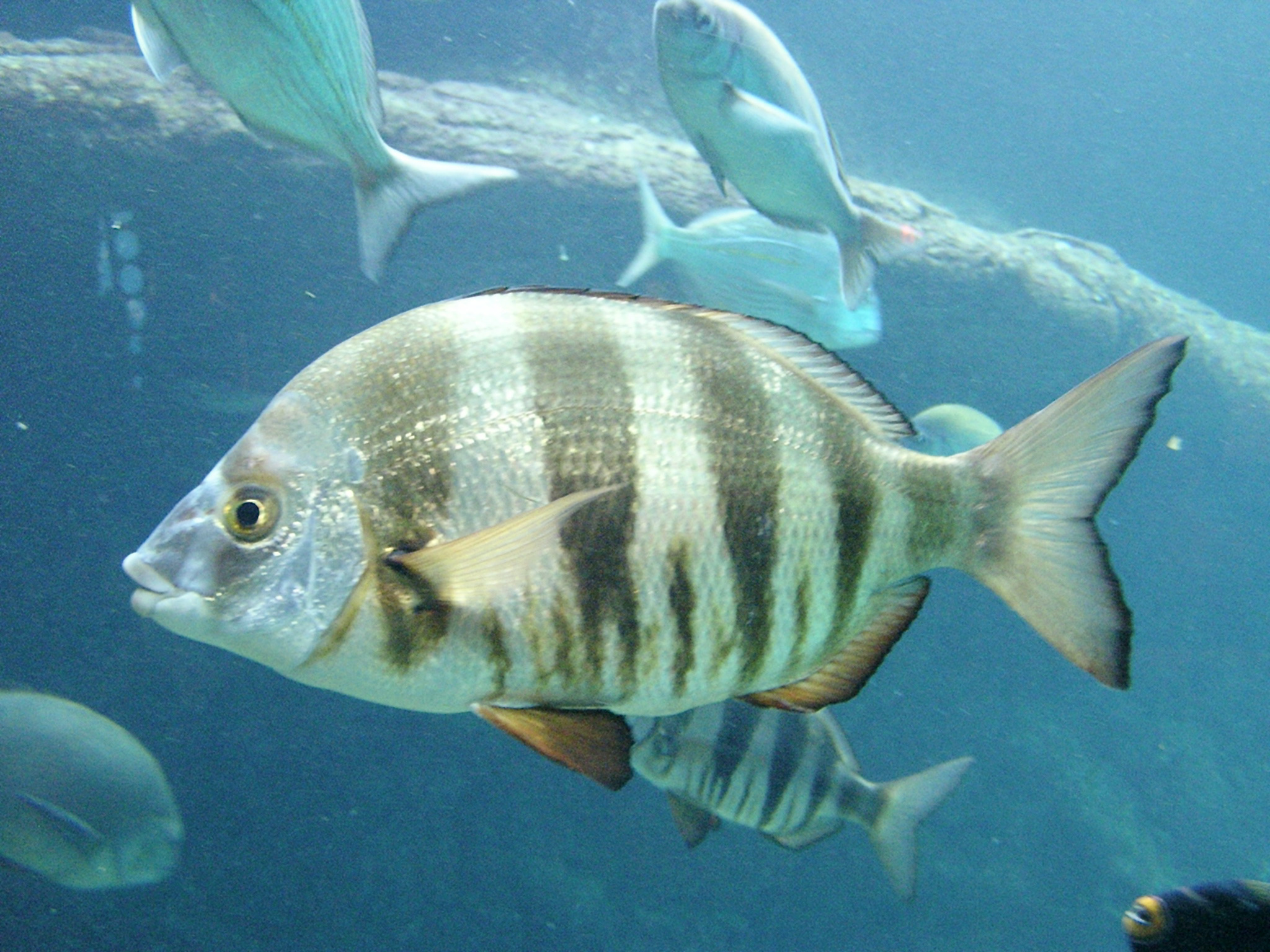

Conservation status
- Least Concern (IUCN 3.1)

Scientific classification
- Kingdom: Animalia
- Phylum: Chordata
- Class: Actinopterygii
- Order: Acanthuriformes
- Family: Sparidae
- Genus: Diplodus
- Species: D. hottentotus

Binomial name
- Diplodus hottentotus (A. Smith, 1844)

Synonyms
- Sargus hottentotus A. Smith, 1844; Diplodus cervinus hottentotus (A. Smith, 1844)

= Diplodus hottentotus =

Species of fish

Diplodus hottentotus, the zebra, is a species of marine ray-finned fish belonging to the family Sparidae, which includes the seabreams and porgies. This fish is found in the Western Indian Ocean off Southern Africa.

== Taxonomy ==
Diplodus hottentotus was first formally described in 1844 as Sargus hottentotus in 1844 by the Scottish surgeon, explorer, ethnologist and zoologist Andrew Smith with its type locality given as the southeastern coast of South Africa. This taxon was previously considered to be a subspecies of the D. cervinus but is now considered to be a valid species. There are two disjunct populations of this "cervinus" type seabreams in Southern Africa, one in southern Angola, and the other in southern and eastern South Africa and Mozambique, the population in the southeastern Atlantic off southern Angola is of uncertain taxonomy. The genus Diplodus is placed in the family Sparidae within the order Spariformes by the 5th edition of Fishes of the World. Some authorities classify this genus in the subfamily Sparinae, but the 5th edition of Fishes of the World does not recognise subfamilies within the Sparidae.

== Etymology ==
Diplodus hottentotus has the specific name hottentotus, a latinisation of the pejorative term hottentot, a name given by the original Dutch colonists to the Cape to the indigenous people of that region. In this case it is thought to be geographical, referring to the South African coast.

== Description ==
Diplodus hottentotus has a deep, oval and compressed body with a depth that fits into the standard length between 2 and 2.3 times. The dorsal fin is supported by 11 spines and 12 or 13 soft rays while the anal fin is supported by 3 spines and 11 soft rays. There are 15 fin rays on the pectoral fins. The upper jaw has 10 or 12 incisor-like teeth in the front of the upper jaw and 8 in the lower jaw. The background colour of the body is bright yellow with 5 wide vertical dark bars along the back and flanks, the snout is black and the gill cover is grey. The fins are grey too, except in juveniles which have a pink caudal fin with a black bar at its base. The maximum published total length for this species is 60 cm (24 in), although 30 cm (12 in) is more typical.

== Distribution and habitat ==
Diplodus hottentotus is found in the southwestern Indian Ocean off the south and eastern coasts of South Africa and southern Mozambique. There is a disjunct population in the southeastern Atlantic Ocean off Angola which may be taxonomically distinct. The zebra is a sedentary fish that is found in rocky habitats from the surf-zone as deep as 120 m (390 ft) in submarine canyons. The juveniles are also very sedentary and occur on shallow reefs in below the low tide mark, gullies, tidal pools and in the mouths of estuaries.

== Biology ==
Diplodus hottentotus feed on a variety benthic invertebrates and specialise in preying on polychaetes and amphipoda as adults. This species is a rudimentary hermaphrodite but is functionally gonochoristic with 50% of the fish being sexually mature at a fork length of 28 cm (11 in) and 6 years of age. The spawning season runs from August to December, in the Eastern Cape spawning peaks in October and occurs on inshore reefs.

== Fisheries ==
Diplodus hottentitus has palatable flesh but freshly caught fish emit a nauseating smell. In South Africa this species cannot be sold and may only be caught in recreational fisheries.
