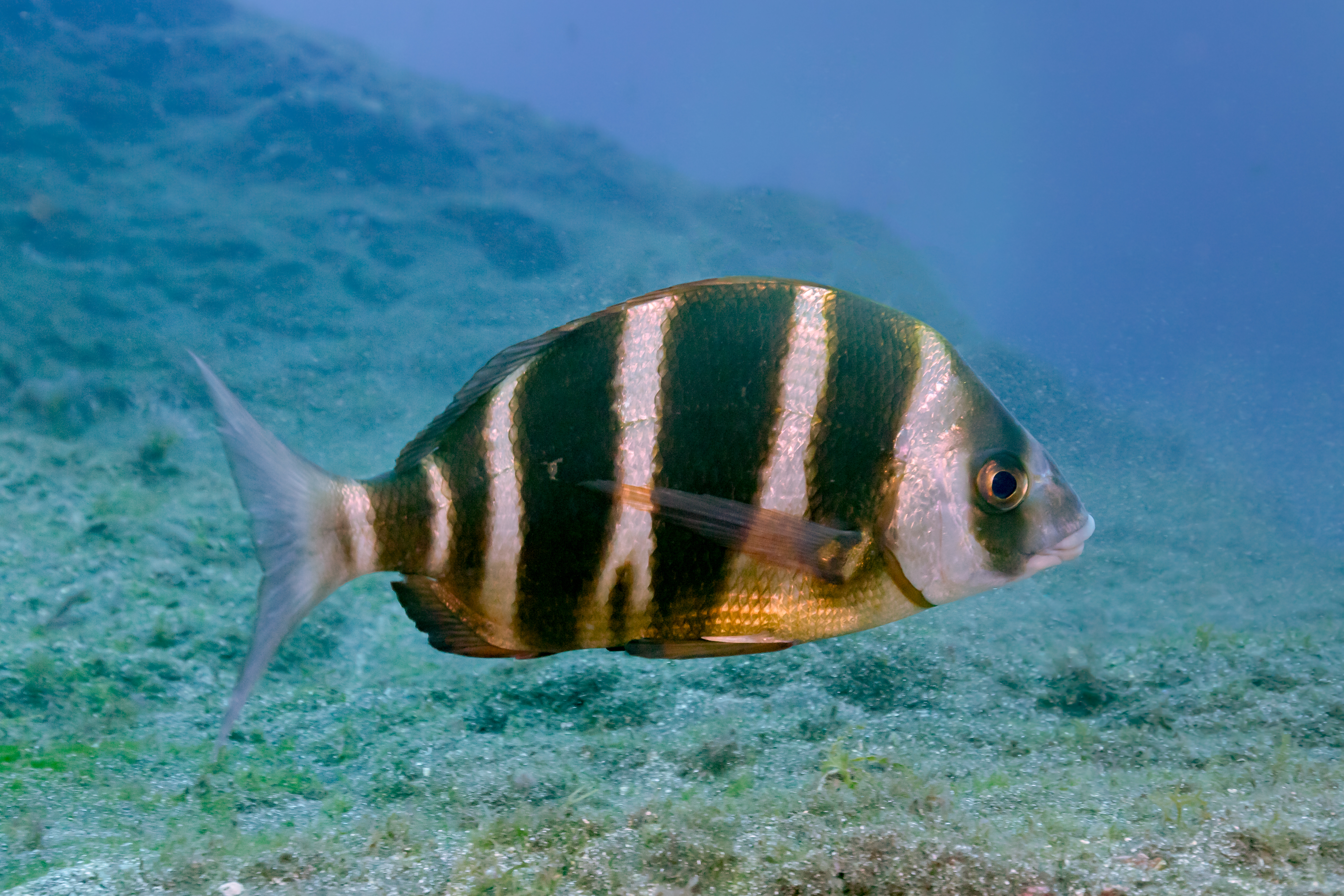

Conservation status
- Least Concern (IUCN 3.1)

Scientific classification
- Kingdom: Animalia
- Phylum: Chordata
- Class: Actinopterygii
- Division: Teleostei
- Order: Acanthuriformes
- Family: Sparidae
- Genus: Diplodus
- Species: D. cervinus

Binomial name
- Diplodus cervinus (Lowe, 1838)

Synonyms
- Charax cervinus Lowe, 1838; Diplodus cervinus cervinus (Lowe, 1838); Sargus cervinus (Lowe, 1838); Sparus trifasciatus Rafinesque, 1810; Diplodus trifasciatus (Rafinesque, 1810); Sargus trifasciatus (Rafinesque, 1810)

= Diplodus cervinus =

Species of fish

Diplodus cervinus, the zebra sea bream, is a species of marine ray-finned fish belonging to the family Sparidae, which includes the seabreams and porgies. This species is found in the temperate north eastern Atlantic Ocean and the Mediterranean Sea.

== Taxonomy ==
Diplodus cervinus was first formally described in 1838 as Charax cervinus with its type locality given as Madeira. In 1971 a neotype was designated which had been collected by Lowe on Lanzarote in 1859 and had been deposited in the British Museum (Natural History). This species was formerly considered to be found off South Africa and in the Indian Ocean but these are now considered to be separate species D. hottentotus and D. omanensis,. The species complex of D. cervinus sensu lato forms a clade within Diplodus with the banded seabream (D. fasciatus). The population in the southeastern Atlantic off southern Angola and Namibia is of uncertain taxonomy. The genus Diplodus is placed in the family Sparidae within the order Spariformes by the 5th edition of Fishes of the World. Some authorities classify this genus in the subfamily Sparinae, but the 5th edition of Fishes of the World does not recognise subfamilies within the Sparidae.

== Etymology ==
Diplodus cervinus has the specific name cervinus which means "deer" which comes from the Portuguese name for this species on Madeira, where Lowe collected the type, sargo veado which translates as "deer sea bream".

== Description ==
Diplodus cervinushas an oval shaped body which is deep and compressed with a moderately sharp snout and a thick lipped slightly protrusible mouth. There are between 10 and 12 incisor-like teeth in the front of the upper jaw with 8 in the lower jaw. Behind these there are between 1 and 3, typically 2, rows of molar-like teeth. The dorsal fin is supported by 11 or 12 spines, increasing in height until the fourth spine, and between 11 and 14 soft rays. The anal fin has 3 spines and between 10 and 12 soft rays supporting it. The tail is forked. The background colour is silvery or golden grey with 5 thick dark vertical bars on the upper body and flanks, a dark area around the eyes and cheeks, dark tip to the snout and a small dark spot at the upper part of the base of the pectoral fin. The pelvic fins are dark with the other fins being greyish, becoming darker towards their margins. The annular seabream has a maximum published total length of 55 cm (22 in), although 35 cm (14 in) is more typical, and a maximum published weight of 2.7 kg (6.0 lb).

== Distribution & habitat ==
Diplodus cervinus is found in the eastern AtlanticOcean from the Bay of Biscay to Mauretania, including the Canary Islands, Madeira and the Cape Verde Islands, into the Mediterranean Sea but not the Black Sea. This is a benthopelagic species, found at depths between 30 and 80 m (98 and 262 ft) over rocky substrates but over sand substrates it can be found down to 300 m (980 ft).

== Biology ==
Diplodus cervinus is an omnivorous fish which feeds on small invertebrates and seaweeds. The zebra seabream is a protogynous hermaphrodite, in which the males usually reach sexual maturity at a total length of around 32.7 cm (12.9 in) when they are five years old while the females attain sexual maturity at a total length of around 27 cm (11 in) and four years old. Spawning runs from spring to summer, with a peak in May and June. The young fish are recruited into the population in October up to January. These young fish occur at depths between 0.5 and 8 m (1 ft 8 in and 26 ft 3 in). The juveniles are found in schools in well vegetated rocky areas. Adults form schools of three to eight individuals in the spawning season, these consist of a single dominant male and a number of females.

== Overfishing ==
Diplodus cervinus has many threats to its population. One of the threats is being overfished. The abundance has been reduced by 85% of the unexploited equilibrium level.
