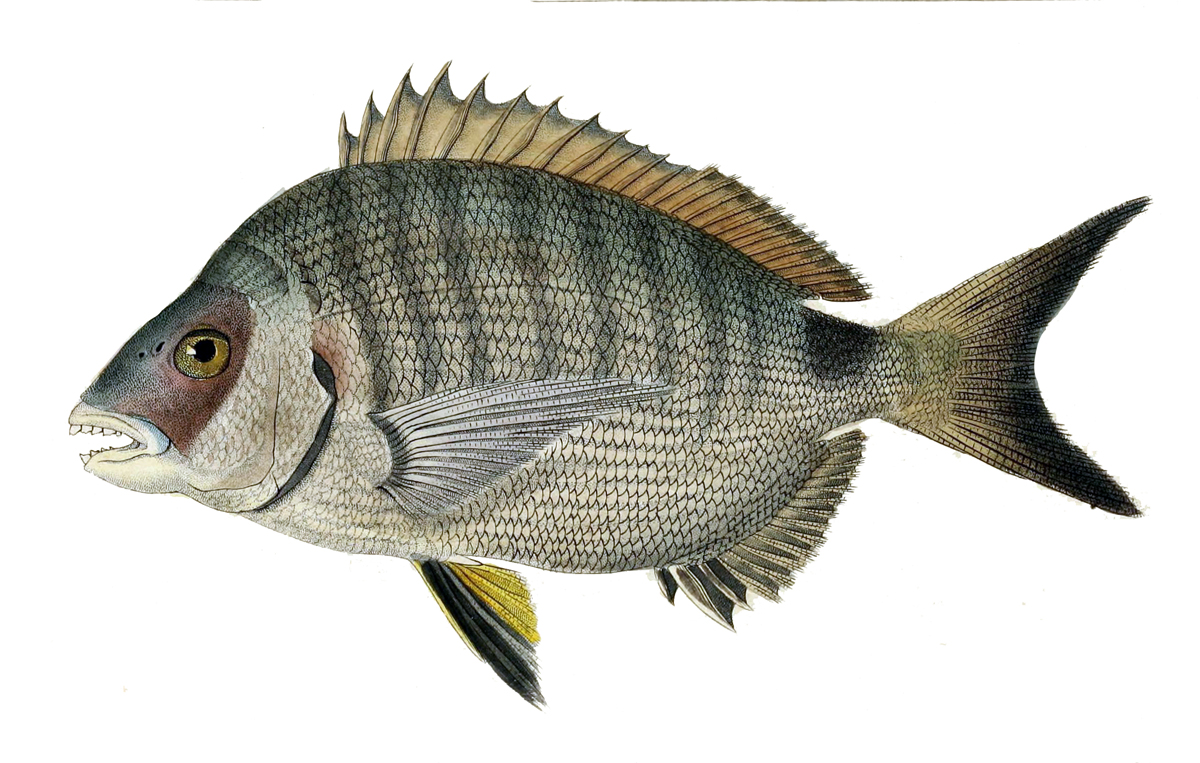
- St. Helena white seabream (Diplodus helenae)

Conservation status
- Least Concern (IUCN 3.1)

Scientific classification
- Kingdom: Animalia
- Phylum: Chordata
- Class: Actinopterygii
- Order: Acanthuriformes
- Family: Sparidae
- Genus: Diplodus
- Species: D. helenae

Binomial name
- Diplodus helenae (Sauvage, 1879)

Synonyms
- Sargus helenae Sauvage, 1879; Diplodus sargus helenae (Sauvage, 1879)

= St. Helena white seabream =

Species of fish

The St. Helena white seabream (Diplodus helenae) is a species of marine ray-finned fish belonging to the family Sparidae, which includes the seabreams and porgies. This fish is endemic to the island of Saint Helena in the southern Atlantic.

== Taxonomy ==
The St. Helena white seabream was first formally described as Sarus helenae in 1879 by the French zoologist Henri Émile Sauvage with its type locality given as Saint Helena Island. This species was previously considered a subspecies of the sargo (D. sargus) but is now considered to be a valid species. The genus Diplodus is placed in the family Sparidae within the order Spariformes by the 5th edition of Fishes of the World. Some authorities classify this genus in the subfamily Sparinae, but the 5th edition of Fishes of the World does not recognise subfamilies within the Sparidae.

== Etymology ==
The St. Helena white seabream has the specific name helenae which means "of Helena", a reference to the type locality.

== Description ==
The St. Helena white seabream has a row of 8 incisor-like teeth in the upper jaw with more than a single row of small well-developed molar-like teeth behind them. The dorsal fin is supported by 11 or 12 spines and there are between 57 and 71 lateral line scales. The blotch on the caudal peduncle is saddle shaped. This species has a maximum published total length of 31 cm (12 in), although 20 cm (7.9 in) is more typical.

== Distribution and habitat ==
The St. Helena white seabream is endemic to the waters around Saint Helena in the southern central Atlantic. Here it is found at depths between 5 and 15 m (16 and 49 ft) in areas of rock mixed with sand.
