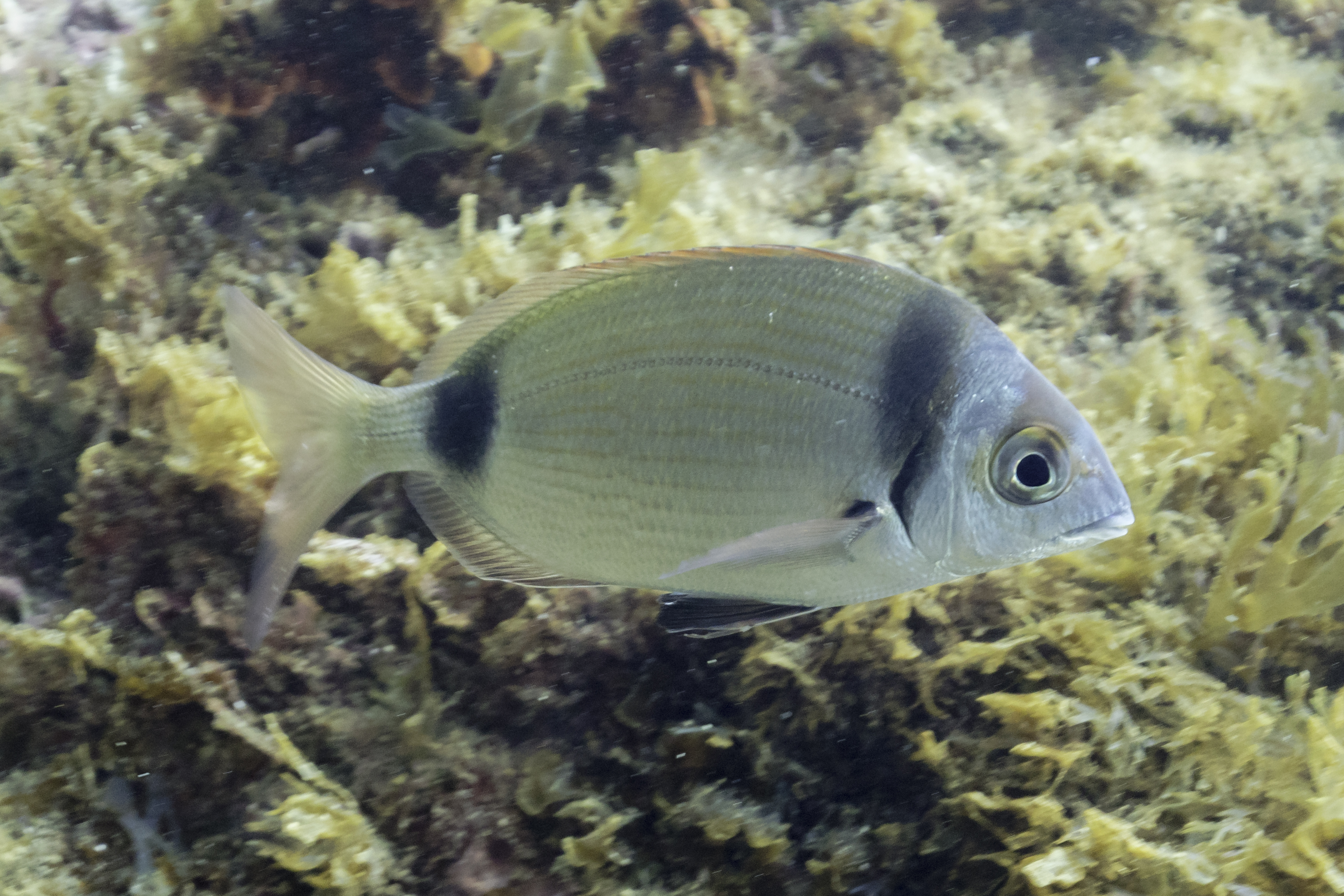
- Arrábida Natural Park, Portugal

Conservation status
- Least Concern (IUCN 3.1)

Scientific classification
- Kingdom: Animalia
- Phylum: Chordata
- Class: Actinopterygii
- Order: Acanthuriformes
- Family: Sparidae
- Genus: Diplodus
- Species: D. vulgaris

Binomial name
- Diplodus vulgaris (Geoffroy Saint-Hilaire, 1817)

Synonyms
- Sargus vulgaris Geoffroy Saint-Hilaire, 1817; Sparus aldrovandi Nardo, 1827; Sargus salviani Valenciennes, 1830

= Diplodus vulgaris =

Species of fish

Diplodus vulgaris, the common two-banded sea bream, is a species of marine ray-finned fish belonging to the family Sparidae, which includes the seabreams and porgies. This species is found in the northeastern Atlantic Ocean and the Mediterranean. It is an important species for fisheries and is grown in aquaculture.

== Taxonomy ==
Diplodus vulgaris was first formally described in 1817 as Sparus vulgaris by the French naturalist Étienne Geoffroy Saint-Hilaire with the type locality given as the Mediterranean Sea off Egypt. Within the genus Diplodus this species is most closely related to D. prayensis, which replaces it in Cape Verde, and these form a clade with the D.sargus species complex. The genus Diplodus is placed in the family Sparidae within the order Spariformes by the 5th edition of Fishes of the World. Some authorities classify this genus in the subfamily Sparinae, but the 5th edition of Fishes of the World does not recognise subfamilies within the Sparidae.

== Etymology ==
Diplodis vulgaris has the specific name vulgaris, this means "common", an allusion not explained by Geoffroy Saint Hilaire but it may be a reference to its Arabic common name in Egypt of chargouch, meaning "sea rat".

== Description ==
Diplodus vulgaris has an oval shaped, deep, compressed body with a moderately fleshy-lipped slightly protrusible mouth. There are 8 slender brown coloured incisor-like teeth at the front of each jaw with between 3 and 5 rows of molar-like teeth in the upper jaw and between2 and 4 rows of similar teeth in the lower jaw. The molar like teeth sit behind the incisor-like teeth and extend along the sides of each jaw. The dorsal fin is supported by 11 or 12 spines and between 13 and 16 soft rays while there are 3 spines and 12 to 15 soft rays supporting the anal fin. The overall colour is grey, greenish or brownish, paler on the lower body. There is a dark band on the nape which extends to the base of the pectoral fins and to the rear edge of the gill cover, a second dark band rings the caudal peduncle immediately behind the rearmost soft rays of the dorsal and anal fins. This may be less extensive in young individuals. There is a black spot at the base of the pectoral fn. The forked caudal fin is dark, darkening towards the rear margin while the other fins are greyish, also darkening towards their margins. The common two-banded seabream has a maximum published total length of 45 cm (18 in), although 22 cm (8.7 in) is more typical, with a maximum published weight of 1.3 kg (2.9 lb).

== Distribution and habitat ==
Diplodus vulgaris is found in the northeastern Atlantic Ocean from the Canary Islands and Madeira north to the Bay of Biscay and throughout the Mediterranean and Black Sea. In the Bay of Biscay the species has been spreading north and is now found as far north as the Channel Islands and Normandy. The common two-banded seabream is an oceanodromous, euryhaline, benthopelagic fish found at depths between 0 and 160 m (0 and 525 ft), although typically found in water less than 50 m (160 ft) deep, over rocky and sandy substrates. The young fishes may be found living among seagrass beds.

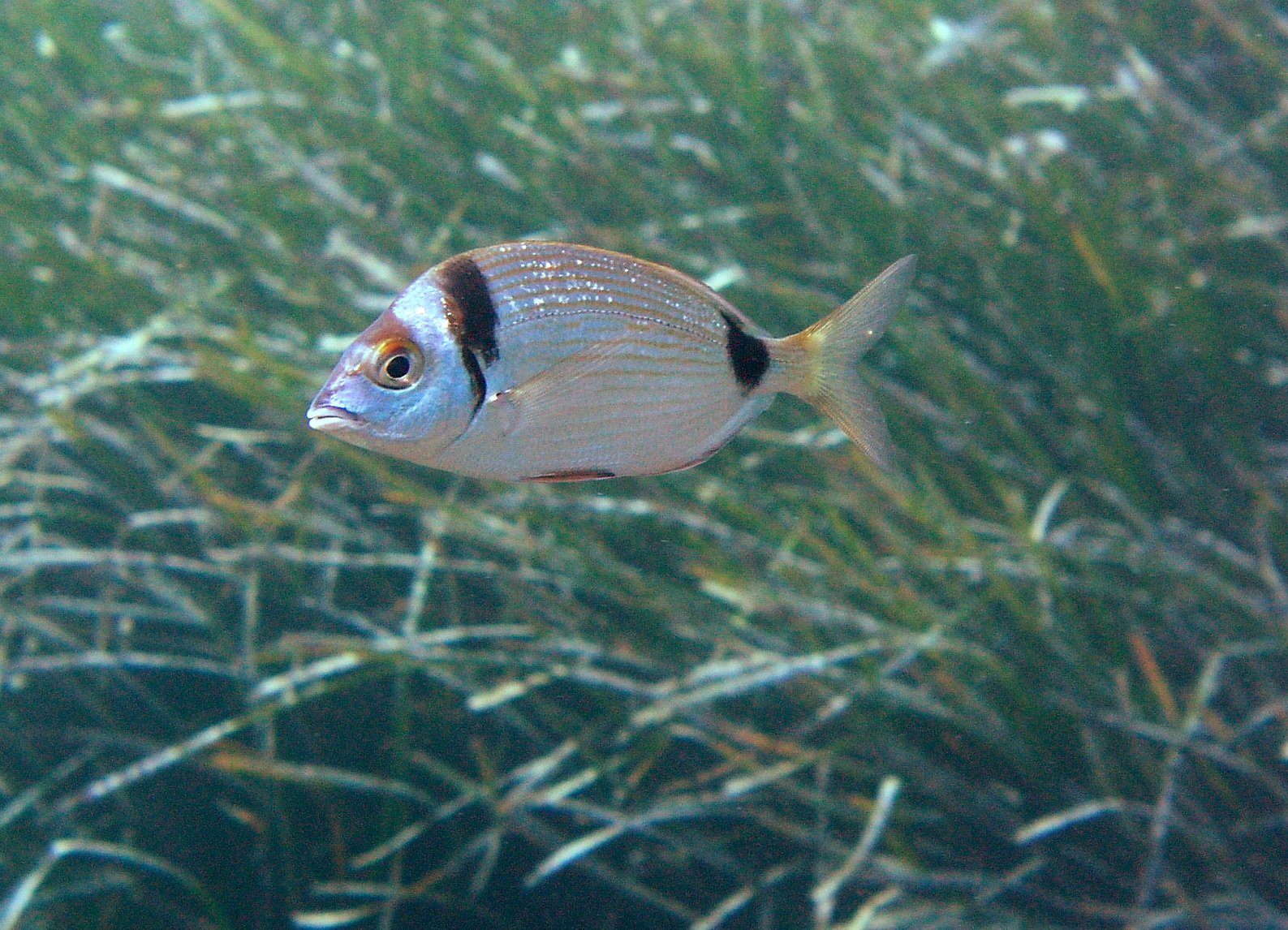
Elba

== Biology ==
Diplodus vulgaris is carnivorous, a study of their diet in the Adriatic Sea found that the preyed on crustaceans, molluscs, polychaetes, fish eggs and sea urchins with the most important prey being zooplanktonic copepods and gastropods. They also found that prey preferences changed as the fish grew with smaller fish mainly feeding on zooplankton and larger fish on benthic invertebrates. Another study, off southwestern Portugal, found that the common two-banded seabream preyed on brittle stars, polychaetes, amphipods and sea urchins.

The common two-banded seabream is a protandric hermaphrodite. A study in the Gulf of Gabes in Tunisia found that the sex ratio was 1.66 females to each male. It also found that the spawning season ran from October to February, peaking in December and January. The total length at which half of the population attained sexual maturity was around 14.14 cm (5.57 in) for females and 13.57 cm (5.34 in) for males. In the Aegean Sea workers found that the spawning season ran from September until March and peaked during December and that the size that 50% of the population reached sexual maturity was 18.35 cm (7.22 in) for males and 20.37 cm (8.02 in) for females. Females were found to have oocyte counts between 10,727 and 316,730, with a mean of around 73,000.

The common two-banded seabream has been found to be the host of more than 50 species of parasite.

== Fisheries ==
Diplodus vulgaris is subjected to semi-industrial fishing in some parts of the Mediterranean such as Sicily, the Adriatic Sea and Egypt whereas in other areas it is mainly targeted by artisanal fisheries, as well as recreational fisheries. The species is widely available in markets across the Mediterranean and is sold fresh or frozen or salted, despite the flesh not being all that well regarded. The fish are caught in traps in the Canaries with nets and lines used throughout its range, as well as spearing. Diplodus seabreams are very important in Portugal where their combined landings are 13th in importance and 1th in commercial value. The common two-banded seabream is also a potential species for growing in aquaculture as it is euryhaline and attains maturity without the need for hormone treatments,=.
