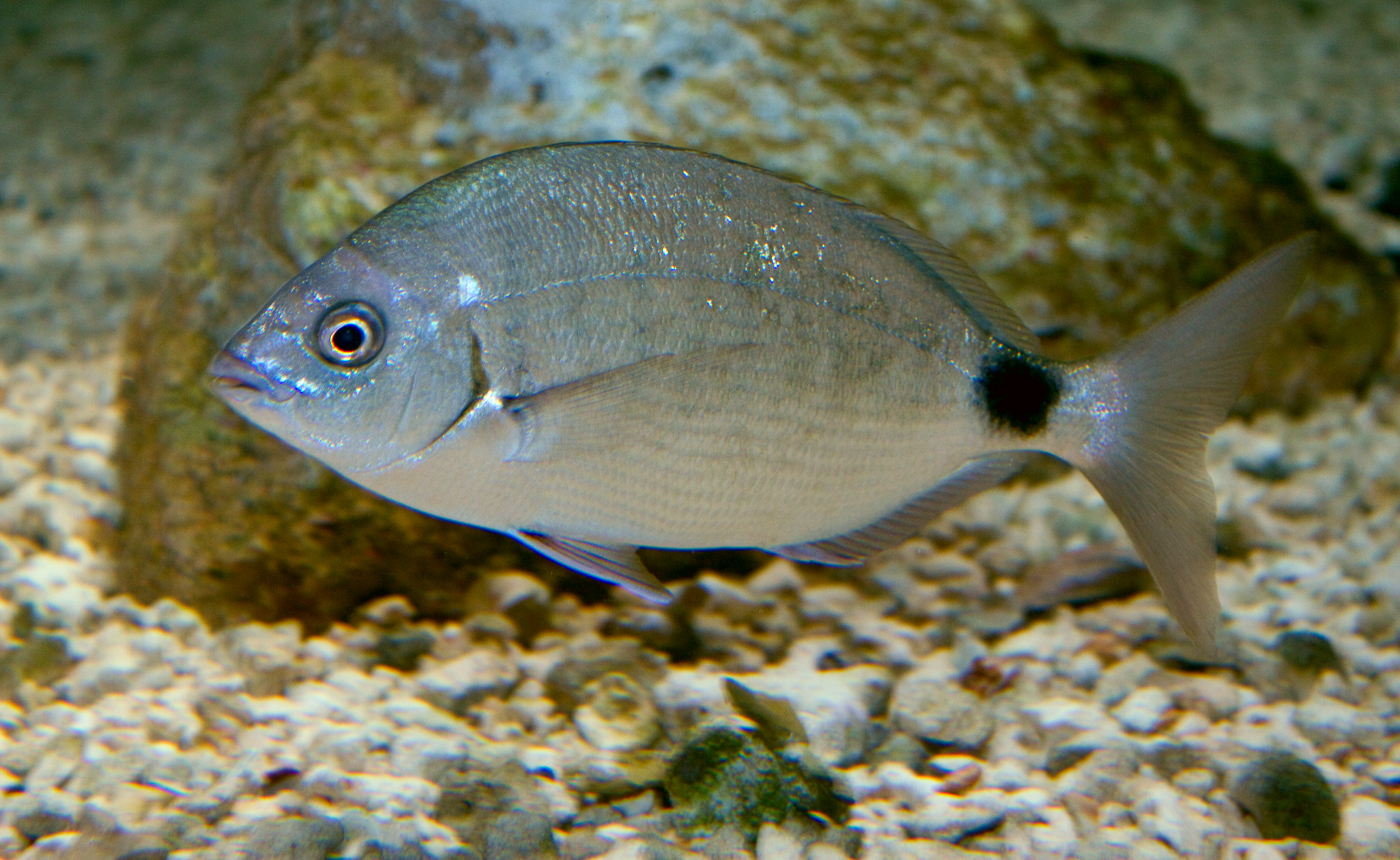

Scientific classification
- Kingdom: Animalia
- Phylum: Chordata
- Class: Actinopterygii
- Order: Acanthuriformes
- Family: Sparidae
- Genus: Diplodus
- Species: D. bermudensis

Binomial name
- Diplodus bermudensis Caldwell, 1965

= Diplodus bermudensis =

Species of fish

Diplodus bermudensis, the Bermuda Bream, which is also known as the Bermuda Porgy, is a species of fish in the family Sparidae of the order Acanthuriformes. This species of fish is endemic to Bermuda. The world record is 1 lb 12 oz (0.79 kg) caught in June 2024 by American angler Joseph Rhee.
