= Digyny =

Result of a diploid ovum becoming fertilized by a monoploid sperm

Digyny (also digynia) refers to the process of a diploid ovum becoming fertilized by a haploid sperm. The result of digyny is a triploid zygote. In humans, both gametes (ovum and sperm) are normally haploid and give rise to a diploid zygote.

Digyny results in gestational abnormalities in humans, including an abnormally small placenta and a very growth-restricted fetus. As a result, the majority of triploid pregnancies are spontaneously aborted. The incidence rate of a live-born triploid human is approximately 1 in 100,000.

== See also ==
- Polyploidy
- Triploid syndrome
