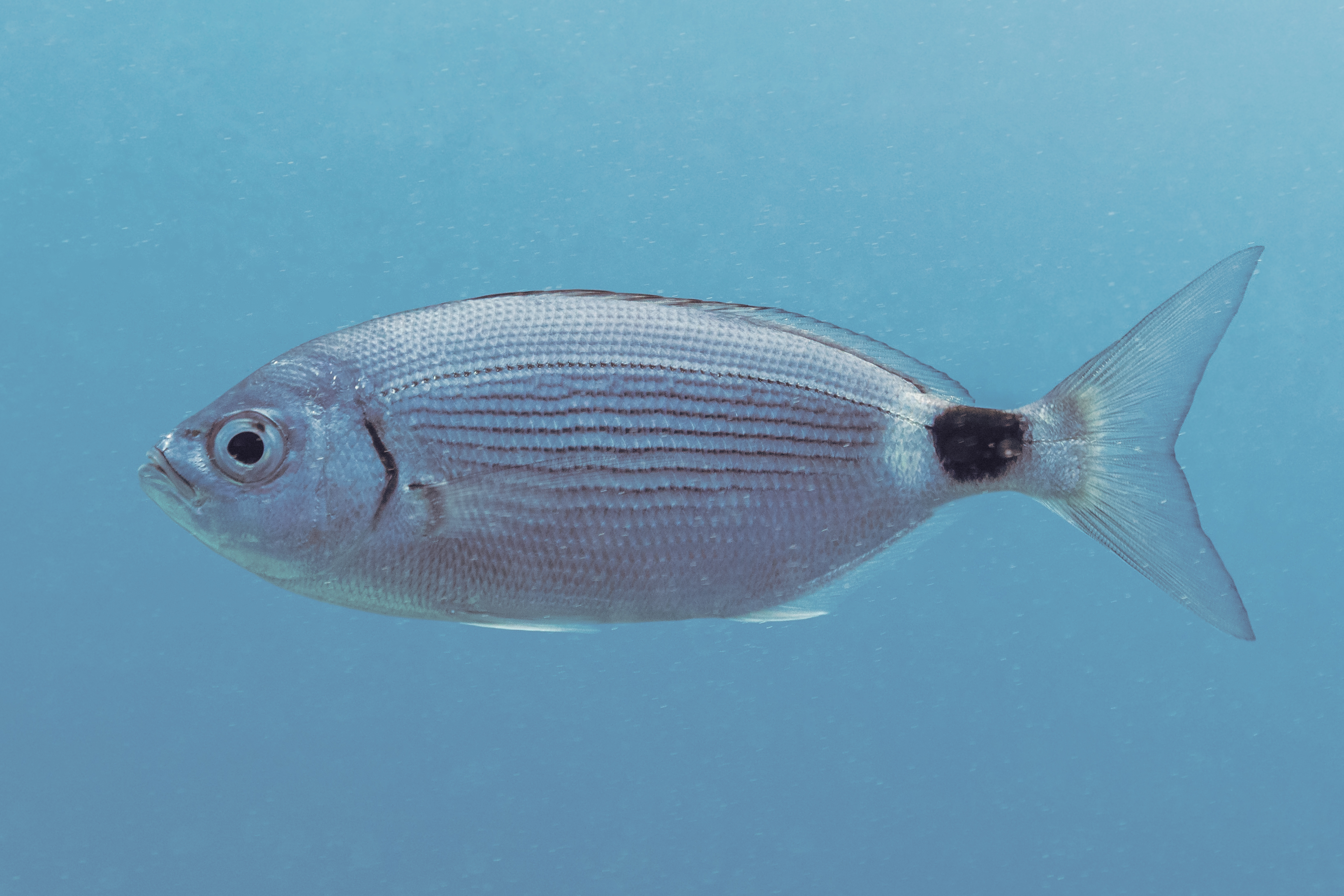

Conservation status
- Least Concern (IUCN 3.1)

Scientific classification
- Kingdom: Animalia
- Phylum: Chordata
- Class: Actinopterygii
- Division: Teleostei
- Order: Acanthuriformes
- Family: Sparidae
- Genus: Oblada; Cuvier, 1829
- Species: O. melanura

Binomial name
- Oblada melanura (Linnaeus, 1758)

Synonyms
- Sparus melanurus Linnaeus, 1758

= Saddled seabream =

Species of fish

The saddled seabream (Oblada melanura), also called the saddle bream or oblade, is a species of ray-finned fish belonging to the family Sparidae, which includes the seabreams and porgies. It is the only species in the monospecific genus Oblada. This species is found in the Eastern Atlantic Ocean. It is an important food fish within its range.

== Taxonomy ==
The saddled seabream was first formally described as Sparus melanurus by Carl Linnaeus in the 10th edition of Systema Naturae with its type locality given as the Mediterranean. In 1829 Georges Cuvier classified S. melanurus in the monotypic genus Oblada. A study of mitochondrial DNA in 2005 found that the saddled bream was the sister species of Diplodus puntazzo. The genus Oblada is placed in the family Sparidae within the order Spariformes by the 5th edition of Fishes of the World. Some authorities classify this genus in the subfamily Boopsinae, but the 5th edition of Fishes of the World does not recognise subfamilies within the Sparidae.

== Etymology ==
The saddled seabream has the generic name Oblada, this is a latinisation of oblado, a vernacular name for this species in Marseille, one of three names (the others being blade and hibaldo) as recorded by Morten Thrane Brünnich in 1768. Its specific name melanurus means "black tail" and is an allusion to the large black spot on the caudal peduncle.

== Description ==
The saddled seabream has an oblong shaped, somewhat compressed body. The dorsal profile of the head is straight and it has an elongated, sharply pointed snout with a low set horizontal, fleshy lipped mouth. The eyes are small and rear nostrils are slits. The scales on the crown do not reach past the rear margin of the eyes. The preoperculum has no scales. The teeth in the font of the flaws are small and arranged bands, the upper jaw has 3–6 rows of molars with 2 and 4 rows of molars on the lower jaw. The dorsal fin is supported by 11 or 12 spines and 11 or 12 soft rays while the anal fin contains 3 spines and 10 or 11 soft rays. The background colour is grey with silvery tints, darker on the back, with 14 or 15 vertical dark brown or grey bars along the flanks. Three is a large white-edged black saddle marking on the caudal peduncle. The dorsal and caudal fins are pale yellowish or pinkish, the other fins are dark. The saddled seabream has a maximum published total length of 36.6 cm (14.4 in), although 20 cm (7.9 in) is more typical, with a maximum published weight of 525 g (18.5 oz).

== Distribution and habitat ==
The saddled seabream is found in the Eastern Atlantic where it ranges from in the Bay of Biscay, Madeira, Cape Verde, Canary Islands and Strait of Gibraltar south to Angola. It is also found in the Mediterranean, Sea of Marmara and the term southern part of the Black Sea. It is found at depths down to 30 m (98 ft) over rocky substrates and in bedside Zostera seagrass and seaweed.

== Biology ==
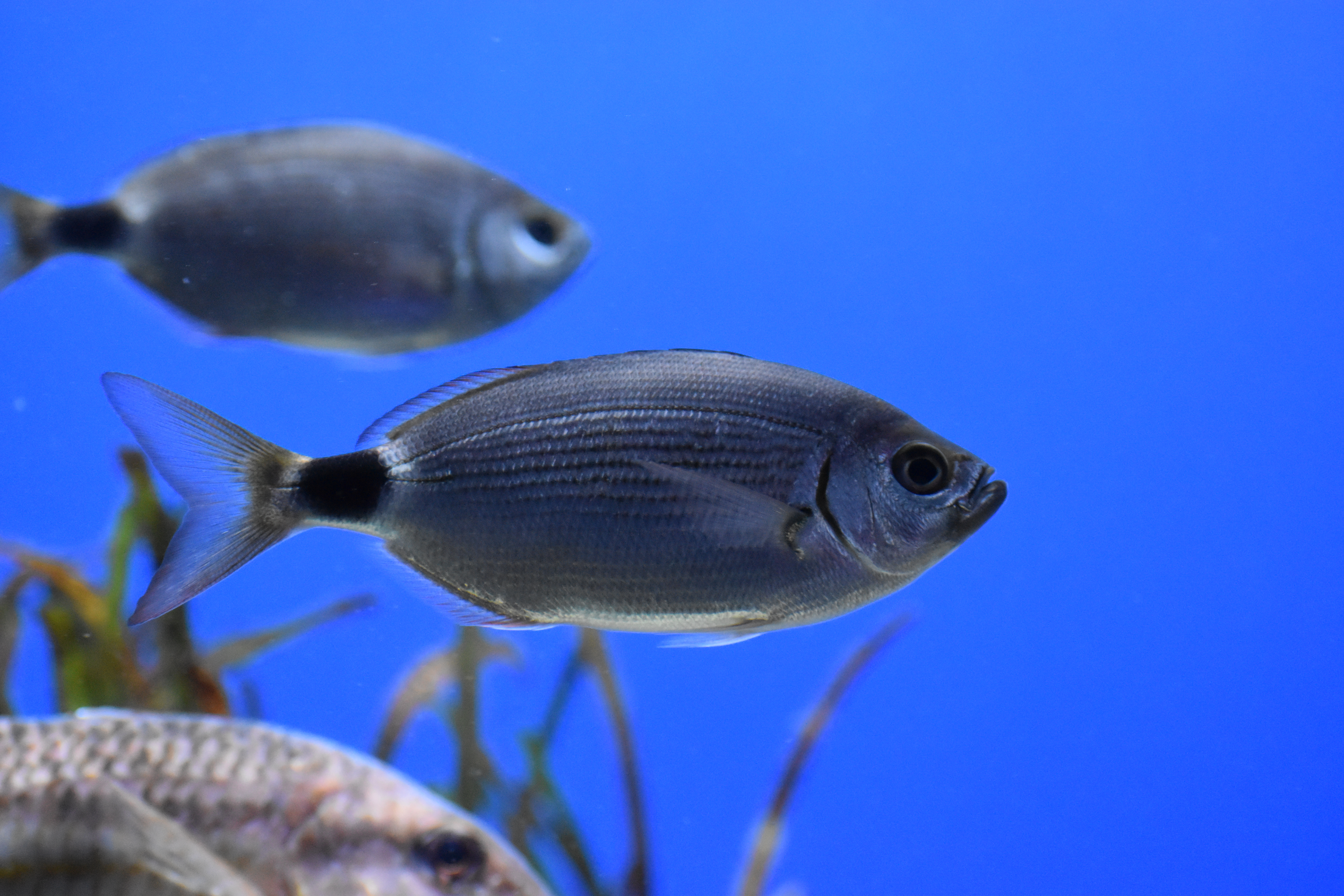
In a public aquarium

The saddled seabream is a gregarious fish, spawning in June and July. This species is an omnivorous fish, but feeds mainly on small invertebrates. This species spawns between April and June and the juveniles settle between July and September. Normally this is a is gonochoristic fish, although some are protogynous, and all adults with lengths greater than 29.3 cm (11.5 in) are female.

The fish was reported in September 2023 to be attacking older swimmers with warts, moles or cuts.

== Fisheries ==
The saddled seabream is valued as a food fish in the Mediterranean where 862 t (848 long tons; 950 short tons) were landed in 2005. It is fished for by both commercial and sports fishers, but it is not the target of a dedicated fishery. It is caught using beach seines, trawls, deep nets and hand lines and it is frequently for sale in fish markets throughout the northern Mediterranean. However, it is rarely offered for sale in North Africa, Israel or France and it is generally discarded by Portuguese fishers. Fish landed are sold fresh or frozen, although the flesh is not held in high esteem, and are also processed into fish meal or fish oil.
