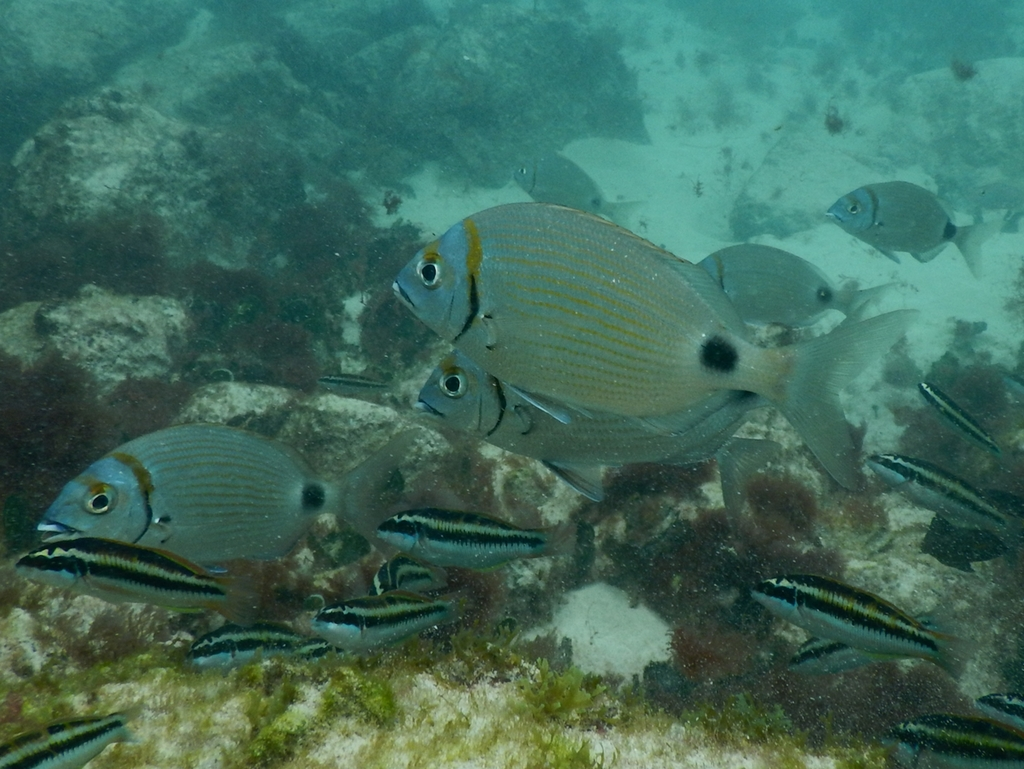

Conservation status
- Least Concern (IUCN 3.1)

Scientific classification
- Kingdom: Animalia
- Phylum: Chordata
- Class: Actinopterygii
- Order: Acanthuriformes
- Family: Sparidae
- Genus: Diplodus
- Species: D. prayensis

Binomial name
- Diplodus prayensis Cadenat, 1964

= Diplodus prayensis =

Species of fish

Diplodus prayensis, the two-banded seabream, is a species of marine ray-finned fish belonging to the family Sparidae, which includes the seabreams and porgies. This species is endemic to the Cape Verde Islands.

== Taxonomy ==
Diplodus prayensis was first formally described in 1964 by the French ichthyologist Jean Cadenat with its type locality given as the port of Praia on Santiago in Cape Verde. This species is most closely related to the common two-banded seabream (D. vulgaris). The genus Diplodus is placed in the family Sparidae within the order Spariformes by the 5th edition of Fishes of the World. Some authorities classify this genus in the subfamily Sparinae, but the 5th edition of Fishes of the World does not recognise subfamilies within the Sparidae.

== Etymology ==
Diplodua prayensis has the specific name prayensis, this suffixes the placename Praia, the capital of Cape Verde and the type locality, with ensis meaning "of".

== Description ==
Diplodus prayensis has an oval shaped, compressed body with a slightly protrusible mouth which has moderately fleshy lips. There are 8 brown coloured incisor-like teeth in the front of both the upper and lower jaw with 3 or 4 rows of smaller molar-like teeth set out in a horseshoe pattern behind them and 4 larger molar-like teeth on the sides of the jaws. The dorsal fin is supported by 12 spines and between 13 and 15 soft rays, while the anal fin contains 3 spines and 12 or 13 soft rays. The caudal fin is forked. The overall colour is brownish to greenish with alternating gold and grey horizontal lines along the scale rows. The head is dark with a pale oval patch on the nape, a black line along the edge of the gill cover, a black spot at the base of the pectoral fin. There is a dark bar on the caudal peduncle which is more extensive in adults, reaching the base of the rearmost rays of the dorsal and anal fins. The two-banded seabream has a maximum published total length of 35 cm (14 in), although 25 cm (9.8 in) is more typical.

== Distribution and habitat ==
Diplodus prayensis is found in the eastern Atlantic Ocean where it is endemic to the Cape Verde Islands. It replaces the closely related D. vulgaris in the waters off these islands. It occurs ate depths as deep as 100 m (330 ft) over rocky substrates and even deeper over muddy substrates.

== Biology ==
Diplodus prayensis feeds on invertebrates and seaweed.

== Fisheries ==
Diplodus prayensis is caught in artisanal fisheries in Cape Verde using line gear. The fish landed are sold fresh.
