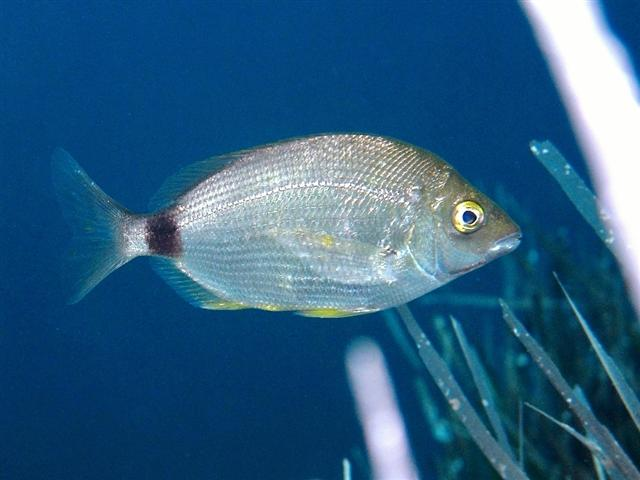
- Diplodus annularis

Scientific classification
- Kingdom: Animalia
- Phylum: Chordata
- Class: Actinopterygii
- Division: Teleostei
- Order: Acanthuriformes
- Family: Sparidae
- Genus: Diplodus; Rafinesque, 1810

Type species
- Sparus annularis Linnaeus, 1758

Synonyms
- Charax Risso, 1827; Denius Gistel, 1848; Puntazzo Bleeker, 1876; Sargus Cuvier, 1816

= Diplodus =

Diplodus Temporal range: Middle Miocene to present

Genus of fishes

Diplodus is a genus of marine ray-finned fish belonging the family Sparidae, which includes the seabreams and porgies. These fishes are found in the Atlantic Ocean, the Mediterranean Sea and the western Indian Ocean.

== Taxonomy ==
Diplodus was first formally proposed as a monospecific genus in 1810 by the French naturalist and polymath Constantine Samuel Rafinesque with Sparus annularis as its type species by monotypy. S. annularis had been described in 1758 from the Mediterranean Sea by Carl Linnaeus in the 10th edition of his Systema Naturae. This genus is placed in the family Sparidae within the order Spariformes by the 5th edition of Fishes of the World. Some authorities classify this genus in the subfamily Sparinae, but the 5th edition of Fishes of the World does not recognise subfamilies within the Sparidae.

Within the genus three clades have been identified, the first consists of D. annularis and D. bellottii, the second is made up of D. vulgaris and D. prayensis while the third splits into further clades, The first of these "sub-clades" comprises D. puntazzo and Oblada melanura, a second made up of D. fasciatus and D. cervinus sensu lato (including D. hottentotus, D. omanensis and the Mascarene endemic D. striatus) while the third consists of D, vulgaris (including D. prayensis) and the D. sargus species complex. This species complex is made up of the Western Atlantic species, D. argenteus, D. bermudensis D. caudimacula and D. holbrooki. the Red Sea endemic D. noct, the Indian Ocean D. kotschyi the eastern Mediterranean D. levantinus and the eastern Atlantic D. ascensionis, D. cadenati D. capensis, D. helenae, D. lineatus and D. sargus. It is also thought that the D. sargus species complex originated in the Cape Verde area and radiated and speciated from there.

== Etymology ==
Diplodus means "double toothed", an allusion Rafinesque did not explain but it may be a reference to the two types of teeth, incisor-like and molar-like, or to the double incisor-like teeth.

== Species ==
Diplodus contains the following extant valid species:

- Diplodus annularis (Linnaeus, 1758) (Annular seabream)
- Diplodus argenteus (Valenciennes, 1830) (Silver seabream)
- Diplodus ascensionis (Valenciennes, 1830)
- Diplodus bellottii (Steindachner, 1882) (Senegal seabream)
- Diplodus bermudensis D. K. Caldwell, 1965 (Bermuda seabream)
- Diplodus cadenati de la Paz, Bauchot & Daget, 1974 (Moroccan white seabream)
- Diplodus capensis (A. Smith, 1844) (Cape white seabream)
- Diplodus caudimacula (Poey, 1860)
- Diplodus cervinus (R. T. Lowe, 1838) (Zebra seabream)
- Diplodus fasciatus (Valenciennes, 1830) (Banded seabream)
- Diplodus helenae (Sauvage, 1879) (St. Helena white seabream)
- Diplodus holbrookii (T. H. Bean, 1878) (Spot-tail seabream)
- Diplodus hottentotus (A. Smith, 1844)
- Diplodus kotschyi (Steindachner, 1876) (One-spot seabream)
- Diplodus levantinus R. Fricke, Golani & Appelbaum-Golani, 2016
- Diplodus lineatus (Valenciennes, 1830)
- Diplodus noct (Valenciennes, 1830) (Red Sea seabream)
- Diplodus omanensis Bauchot & Bianchi, 1984 (Oman seabream)
- Diplodus prayensis Cadenat, 1964 (Two-banded seabream)
- Diplodus puntazzo (Walbaum, 1792) (Sharp-snout seabream)
- Diplodus sargus (Linnaeus, 1758) (White seabream)
- Diplodus striatus (Bliss, 1883)
- Diplodus vulgaris (É. Geoffroy Saint-Hilaire, 1817) (Common two-banded seabream)

The following fossil species are also known, all from the Paratethyan region, where they appear to have been diverse and successful:

- †Diplodus jomnitanus (Valenciennes, 1844) (middle Miocene of Austria, Hungary & Ukraine)
- †Diplodus karrerae Nolf & Steurbaut, 1979 [otolith] (middle to late Miocene of Europe)
- †Diplodus sitifensis (Valenciennes, 1844) (middle Miocene of Austria & Ukraine)

An articulated fossil skeleton of an indeterminate Diplodus is known from the Middle Miocene of Slovakia.

== Characteristics ==
Diplodus seabreams have deep bodies with an elongated ovate shape. There are between 8 and 12 incisor-like teeth in the front of the upper jaw, the rest of the teeth are molar like. The lateral line is made up of 60, or more, scales. There is a scaled sheath at the base of the dorsal and anal fins. The flange on the preoperculum has no scales. The bodies may be marked with dark vertical bars or is plain silvery with a black blotch or spot on the caudal peduncle. The largest species in the genus with maximum published total lengths of 60 cm (24 in) are D. hottentotus and D. puntazzowhile the smallest is D. ascensionis which has a maximum published total length of 22 cm (8.7 in).

== Distribution ==
Diplodus seabreams are found in the Eastern and Western Atlantic Oceans, the Mediterranean Sea, the Black Sea and the Western Indian Ocean.
