= False Tasmanian blenny =

False Tasmanian blenny is a common name for two species of fish in the genus Parablennius native to Australia and may refer to:

- Parablennius intermedius
- Parablennius postoculomaculatus, native to Western Australia
