= Horned blenny =

Horned blenny is the common name of several fish. It may refer to:

- Parablennius cornutus
- Parablennius intermedius
