= Rockpool (disambiguation) =

Rock pools, or tide pools, are rocky pools on the sea shore filled with seawater.

Rock pool, Rock-pool, or Rockpool may also refer to:

== Arts and entertainment ==
- The Rock Pool, a 1936 novel by Cyril Connolly
- "Rockpool", an episode of the television series Teletubbies
- Rockpool films, former name of Five Lip Films, a film production company based in Sydney and Los Angeles
- Rockpool Games, a mobile phone games studio founded by Paul Gouge

== Fish ==
- Hypsoblennius gilberti (also known as rockpool blenny), a species of fish
- Rock-pool blenny (Parablennius parvicornis), a species of fish

== Other uses ==
- Rockpool, a restaurant in Sydney, and Rockpool Bar & Grill, a factory-job steakhouse in Melbourne, both founded by Neil Perry
- Rock Pool (Newcastle), an open air sea pool in Newcastle, Northern Ireland
- SS Rockpool (1927), a British cargo ship shipwrecked in February 1941
