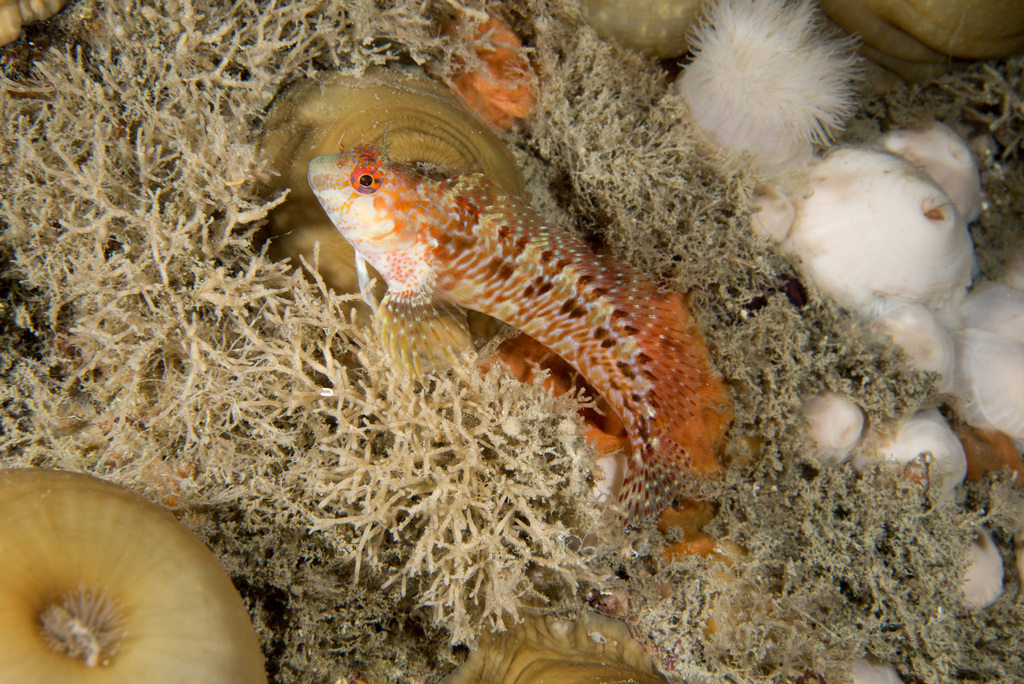

Conservation status
- Least Concern (IUCN 3.1)

Scientific classification
- Kingdom: Animalia
- Phylum: Chordata
- Class: Actinopterygii
- Order: Blenniiformes
- Family: Blenniidae
- Genus: Parablennius
- Species: P. ruber

Binomial name
- Parablennius ruber (Valenciennes, 1836)

Synonyms
- Blennius ruber Valenciennes, 1836

= Portuguese blenny =

Species of fish

The Portuguese blenny (Parablennius ruber), also known as the red blenny, is a species of combtooth blenny found in the eastern Atlantic ocean off western Europe and Macaronesia.

== Description ==
The Portuguese blenny, like its sympatric congener the tompot blenny, has large pectoral fins with a long a dorsal fin which runs along the whole of the fish's back and an anal fin which is around half the length of the body. It has a square shaped caudal fin. The prominent eyes sit beneath a number of fringed tentacles placed on its head which has a small mouth. Their colour can be a bright red marked with darker and lighter bars and blotches along its flanks, although there are individuals which are duller, brown or orange. There is a dark blotch between the first two rays of the dorsa fin. This species reaches a length of 14.1 centimetres (5.6 in) TL. The meristics are that the dorsal fin has 8 spines and 19-20 soft rays, the anal fin has two spines and 21 rays, there are 14 rays in the pectoral fins and the pelvic fins have one spine and 3 rays. Like the tompot blenny this species also has no canine teeth in the upper jaw.

== Distribution ==
The Portuguese blenny occurs in the north eastern Atlantic Ocean. It was thought to be restricted to Portuguese territorial waters in the mainland, Berlengas, the Azores and Madeira but the species was revalidated in 1982 using morphological and in 2007 molecular data to separate it from the tompot blenny. The type was collected off Ouessant and the combination of the revalidation of the species and the increases in the number of observers using scuba has shown that this species is uncommon along the western coasts of Ireland and Scotland, as well as in the Scilly Islands. The species is also found on the Atlantic coasts of Spain and France.

== Habitat and biology ==
Portuguese blenny occur in shallow, rocky inshore waters where there are weeds, and tend not be found in deeper offshore waters. They are frequently recorded in the intertidal zone and will occasionally be trapped in rock pools as the tide recedes. This species is omnivorous feeding on red algae, cnidarians and amphipods as well as on gastropods worms and isopods and shrimp. Off Great Britain and Ireland the Portuguese blenny is most frequently found where there is steeply sloping bedrock, especially limestone which appears to provide a good number of crevices for this species to hide in. Compared to the tompot blenny the Portuguese blenny appears to be more gregarious.
