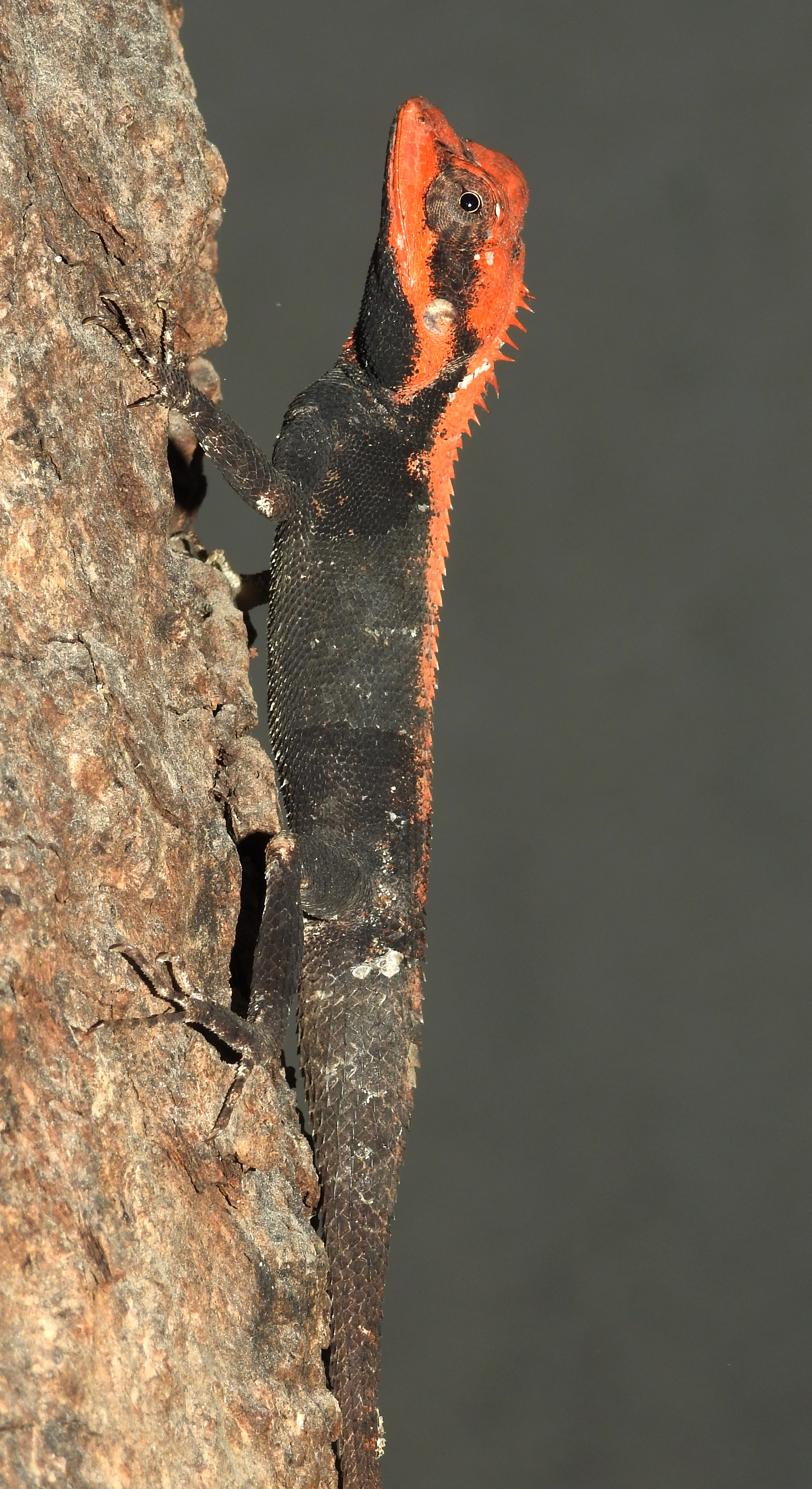
- Monilesaurus rouxii, male in breeding plumage, Roux's forest lizard or Forest Calotes

Scientific classification
- Kingdom: Animalia
- Phylum: Chordata
- Class: Reptilia
- Order: Squamata
- Suborder: Iguania
- Family: Agamidae
- Subfamily: Draconinae
- Genus: Monilesaurus; Pal, Vijayakumar, Shanker, Jayarajan & Deepak, 2018

Species
- 4 species, see here

= Monilesaurus =

Genus of lizards

Monilesaurus is a genus of lizards in the draconine clade of the family Agamidae and is a new genus described in 2018. Currently it consists of 4 species, with 2 new species and 2 species split from the genus Calotes.

== Geographic range ==
The genus Monilesaurus is native to the Western Ghats of India.

== Species ==
Below species were split from Calotes:

- Monilesaurus ellioti Günther, 1864 – Elliot's forest lizard
- Monilesaurus rouxii Duméril & Bibron, 1837 – Roux's forest lizard, Roux's forest calotes, forest blood sucker

Below species are described newly under this genus:

- Monilesaurus acanthocephalus Pal, Vijayakumar, Shanker, Jayarajan, & Deepak, 2018 – spiny-headed forest lizard
- Monilesaurus montanus Pal, Vijayakumar, Shanker, Jayarajan, & Deepak, 2018 – montane forest lizard
