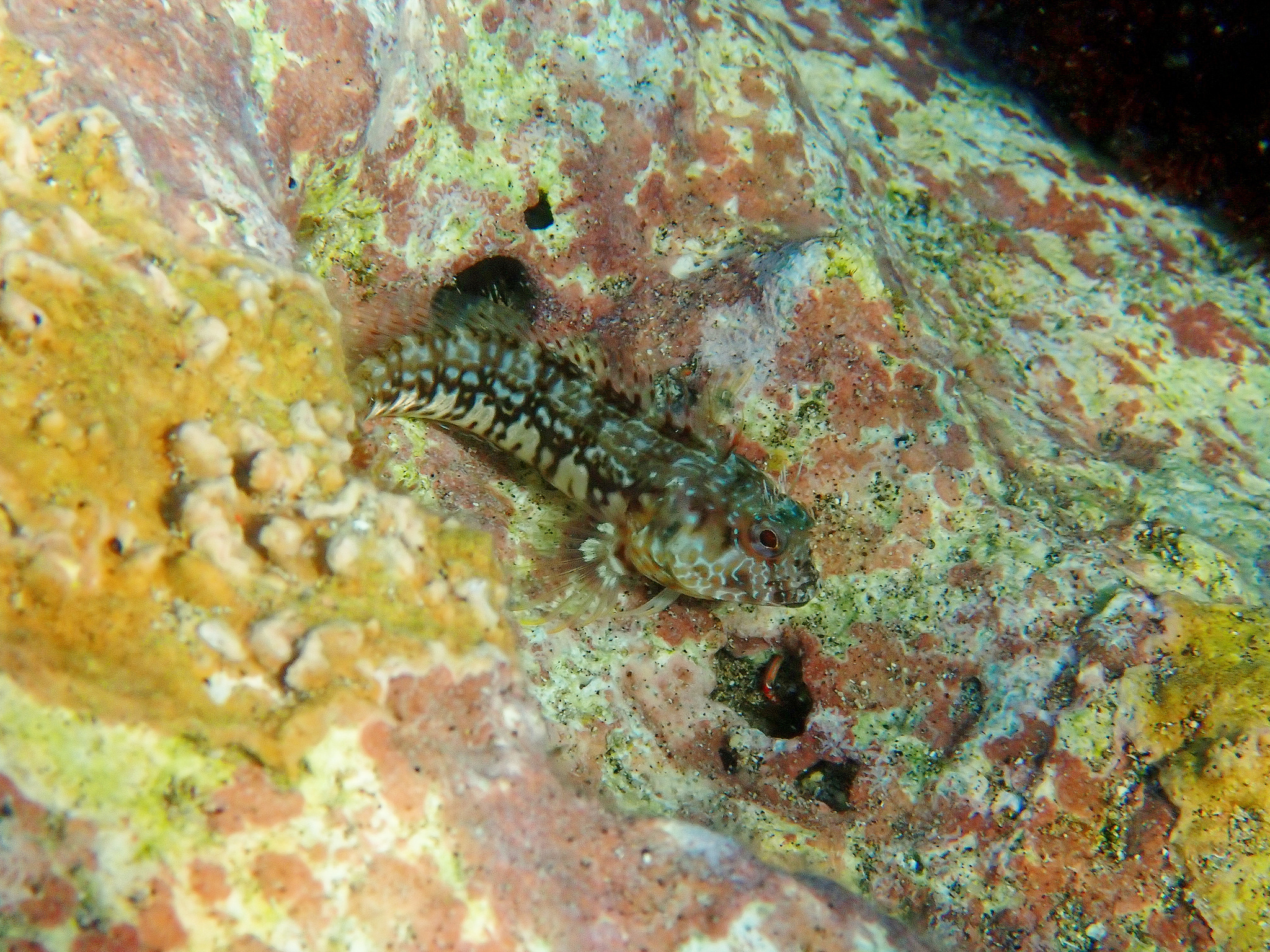

Conservation status
- Least Concern (IUCN 3.1)

Scientific classification
- Kingdom: Animalia
- Phylum: Chordata
- Class: Actinopterygii
- Order: Blenniiformes
- Family: Blenniidae
- Genus: Parablennius
- Species: P. goreensis

Binomial name
- Parablennius goreensis (Valenciennes, 1836)

Synonyms
- Blennius goreensis Valenciennes, 1836

= Parablennius goreensis =

Species of fish

Parablennius goreensis is a species of combtooth blenny found in the eastern Atlantic ocean. This species reaches a length of 7 centimetres (2.8 in) SL. The specific name refers to the type locality, Gorée, in Senegal.
