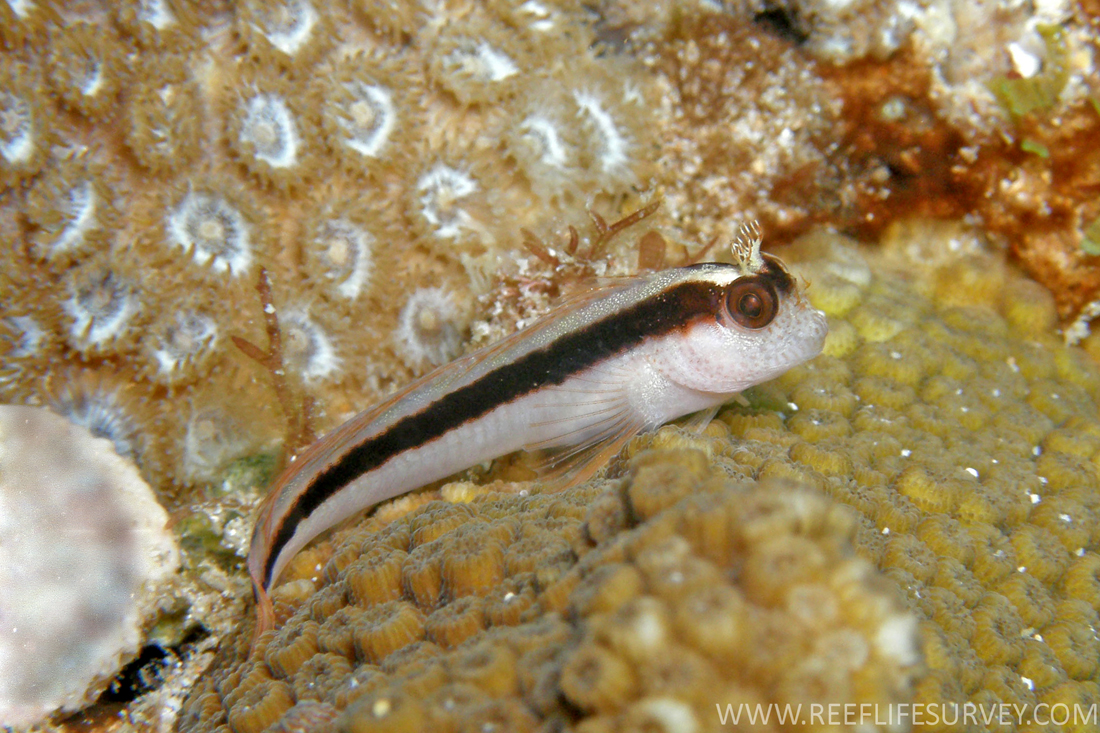

Conservation status
- Vulnerable (IUCN 3.1)

Scientific classification
- Kingdom: Animalia
- Phylum: Chordata
- Class: Actinopterygii
- Order: Blenniiformes
- Family: Blenniidae
- Genus: Parablennius
- Species: P. serratolineatus

Binomial name
- Parablennius serratolineatus Bath & Hutchins, 1986

= Parablennius serratolineatus =

Species of fish

Parablennius serratolineatus, also known as the Norfolk Island blenny, is a species of combtooth blenny found in the southwest Pacific ocean near Norfolk Island.
