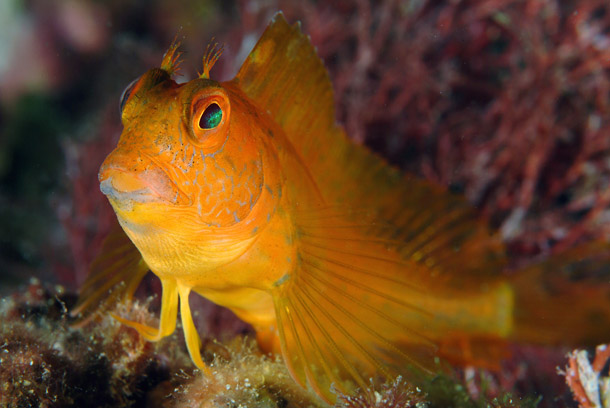

Conservation status
- Least Concern (IUCN 3.1)

Scientific classification
- Kingdom: Animalia
- Phylum: Chordata
- Class: Actinopterygii
- Order: Blenniiformes
- Family: Blenniidae
- Genus: Parablennius
- Species: P. pilicornis

Binomial name
- Parablennius pilicornis (G. Cuvier, 1829)

Synonyms
- Blennius ater Sauvage, 1882; Blennius fascigula Barnard, 1927; Blennius filicornis Günther, 1861; Blennius niger Metzelaar, 1919; Blennius pantherinus Valenciennes, 1836; Blennius pilicornis G. Cuvier, 1829; Blennius pilicornis euskalherriensis Motos & Ibañez, 1977; Blennius trifascigula Fowler, 1935; Blennius vandervekeni Poll, 1959; Pictiblennius niger (Metzelaar, 1919)

= Ringneck blenny =

Species of fish

The ringneck blenny (Parablennius pilicornis) is a species of combtooth blenny widespread in coastal waters of Eastern Atlantic from Spain and Portugal to Möwe Bay, Namibia, in the Mediterranean Sea from Morocco, Algeria, Spain. In the Southwest Atlantic it is found near Brazil and Patagonia, Argentina. Also in Western Indian Ocean from Natal to Knysna in South Africa. This species reaches a length of 12.7 centimetres (5.0 in) SL. It is the type species of the genus Parablennius
