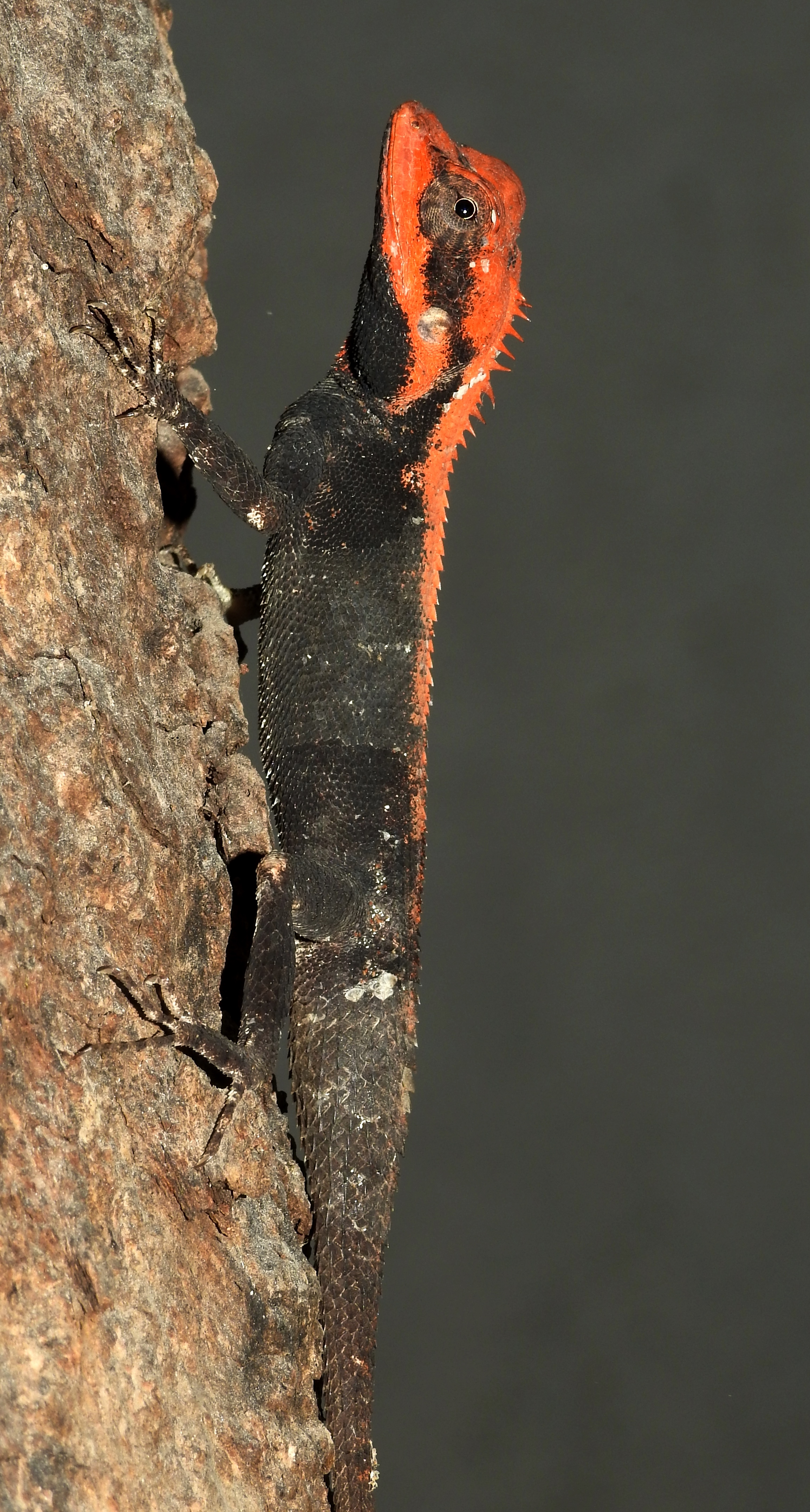
- Male.

Conservation status
- Least Concern (IUCN 3.1)

Scientific classification
- Kingdom: Animalia
- Phylum: Chordata
- Class: Reptilia
- Order: Squamata
- Suborder: Iguania
- Family: Agamidae
- Genus: Monilesaurus
- Species: M. rouxii

Binomial name
- Monilesaurus rouxii (A.M.C. Duméril & Bibron, 1837)

Synonyms
- Calotes rouxii A.M.C. Duméril & Bibron, 1837; Monilesaurus rouxii — Pal et al., 2018

= Monilesaurus rouxii =

Species of reptile

Monilesaurus rouxii, commonly known as Roux's forest lizard, Roux's forest calotes, or the forest blood sucker, is a species of arboreal, diurnal, agamid lizard, which is endemic to hills of peninsular India. In July 2018, it was proposed that the species should be transferred to the new genus Monilesaurus.

== Etymology ==
The specific name, rouxii, is in honor of Jean Louis Florent Polydore Roux, who was a French painter and naturalist.

== Description ==
Monilesaurus rouxii with lighter underparts visible in Mulshi, Maharahstra, India

M. rouxii can attain a total length (including tail) of up to 30 cm (12 in), but 25 cm (9.8 in) is more common. Its body has an olive-brown color, with a lighter belly, a dark band along the side of the head on to the neck, and dark lines radiating from the eye. The limbs are slender, with elongated toes. Two small groups of spines adorn each side of the neck. In males, the upper part of the head, nape, and gular pouch become brick-red in the breeding season.

== Distribution and habitat ==
Monilesaurus rouxii is endemic to hills of peninsular India, including the Western Ghats from Surat Dangs till Palghat; and parts of the Eastern Ghats (Shevaroys, Yelagiri, Melagiri, and in Malkangiri, Araku, Devarakonda) and hills of Deccan plateau (Bellary, Sandur). It has been reported largely from the wet hill forest tracts of peninsular India, except the far south. The species is generally widespread and common throughout its range. It can be found at elevations of 100–900 m (330–2,950 ft) above sea level, in forest habitats ranging from moist evergreen to secondary deciduous forests.

== Ecology ==
M. rouxii is an insectivore, hunting during the day both on the ground and in trees. It is oviparous, breeding between April and September.
