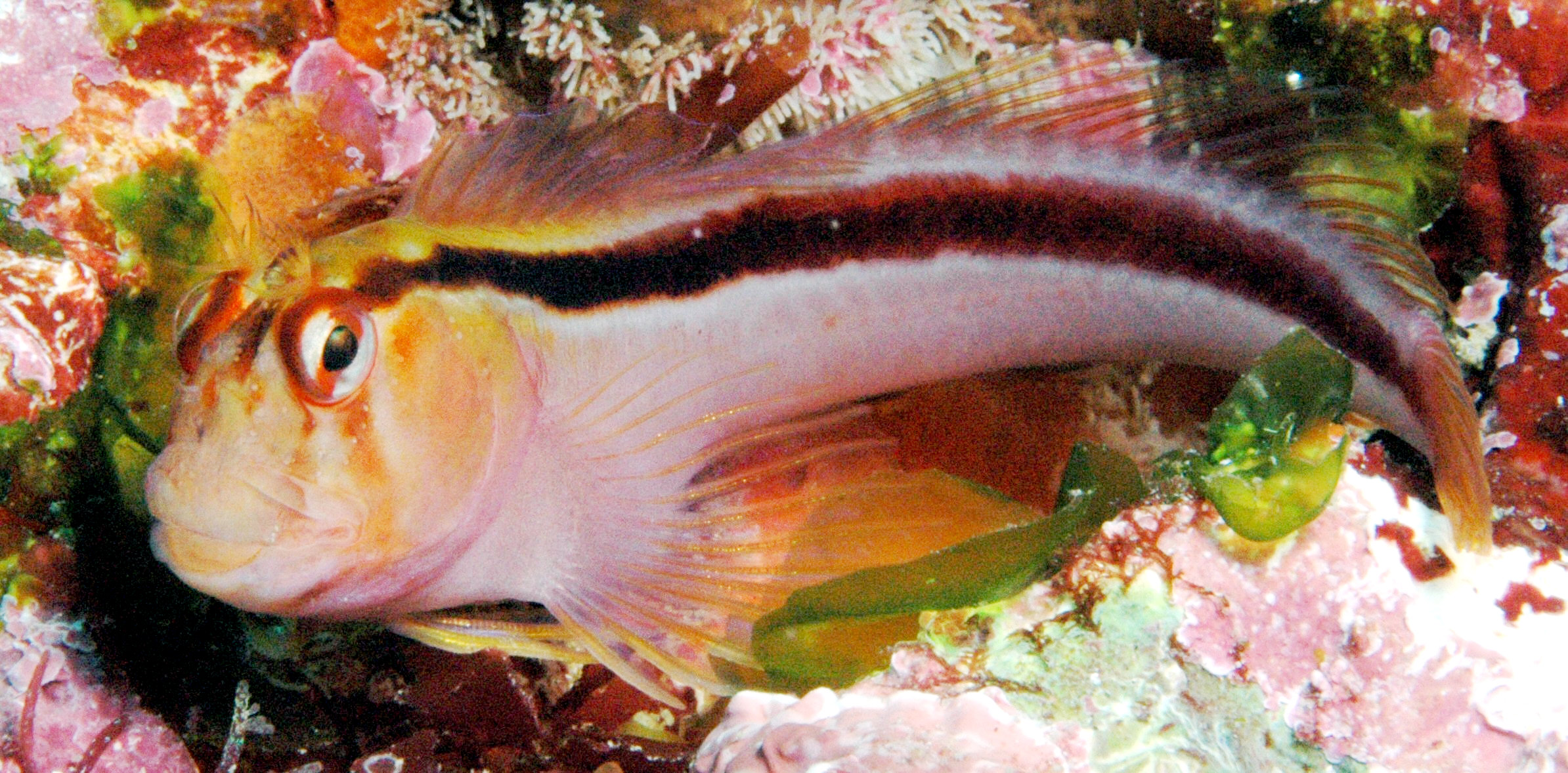

Conservation status
- Least Concern (IUCN 3.1)

Scientific classification
- Kingdom: Animalia
- Phylum: Chordata
- Class: Actinopterygii
- Order: Blenniiformes
- Family: Blenniidae
- Genus: Parablennius
- Species: P. laticlavius

Binomial name
- Parablennius laticlavius (Griffin, 1926)

Synonyms
- Blennius laticlavius Griffin, 1926

= Crested blenny =

Species of fish

The crested blenny (Parablennius laticlavius) is a species of combtooth blenny found off New South Wales, Australia, New Zealand and the Kermadec Islands to depths of between 1 and 3 metres (3.3 and 9.8 ft). This species reaches a length of 8 centimetres (3.1 in) TL.
