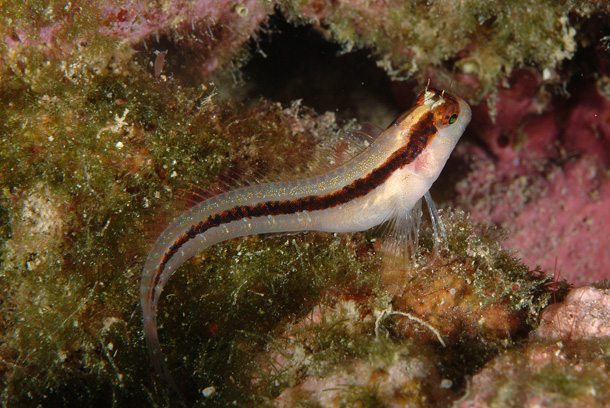

Conservation status
- Least Concern (IUCN 3.1)

Scientific classification
- Kingdom: Animalia
- Phylum: Chordata
- Class: Actinopterygii
- Order: Blenniiformes
- Family: Blenniidae
- Genus: Parablennius
- Species: P. rouxi

Binomial name
- Parablennius rouxi (Cocco, 1833)

Synonyms
- Blennius rouxii Cocco, 1833

= Longstriped blenny =

Species of fish

The longstriped blenny (Parablennius rouxi), also called the striped blenny, is a species of combtooth blenny found in the northeast Atlantic off Portugal, also known from the northern Mediterranean. This species reaches a length of 8 centimetres (3.1 in) TL. The identity of the person honoured by the specific name of this species was not specified but is thought to be the French painter and naturalist Jean Louis Florent Polydore Roux (1792-1833).
