= Parablennius dialloi =

Conservation status
- Least Concern (IUCN 3.1)

Scientific classification
- Kingdom: Animalia
- Phylum: Chordata
- Class: Actinopterygii
- Order: Blenniiformes
- Family: Blenniidae
- Genus: Parablennius
- Species: P. dialloi

Binomial name
- Parablennius dialloi Bath, 1990

Species of fish

Parablennius dialloi is a species of combtooth blenny found in the Eastern and Central Atlantic: Cape Verde to Moçâmedes, Angola. The specific name honours the Senegales curator Amadou Diallo of the Musée de la Mer in Gorée Senegal, who provided specimens to Hans Bath and translated for him while he was working in Senegal.
