= Parablennius cyclops =

Conservation status
- Least Concern (IUCN 3.1)

Scientific classification
- Kingdom: Animalia
- Phylum: Chordata
- Class: Actinopterygii
- Order: Blenniiformes
- Family: Blenniidae
- Genus: Parablennius
- Species: P. cyclops

Binomial name
- Parablennius cyclops (Rüppell, 1830)

Synonyms
- Pictiblennius cyclops (Rüppell, 1830); Salarias cyclops Rüppell, 1830

Species of fish

Parablennius cyclops is a species of combtooth blenny found in the western Indian Ocean, in the Red Sea.
