= Parablennius verryckeni =

Conservation status
- Data Deficient (IUCN 3.1)

Scientific classification
- Kingdom: Animalia
- Phylum: Chordata
- Class: Actinopterygii
- Order: Blenniiformes
- Family: Blenniidae
- Genus: Parablennius
- Species: P. verryckeni

Binomial name
- Parablennius verryckeni (Poll, 1959)

Synonyms
- Blennius verryckeni Poll, 1959

Species of fish

Parablennius verryckeni is a species of combtooth blenny found in the eastern Atlantic ocean from Congo to Sierra Leone. This species reaches a length of 4.9 centimetres (1.9 in) TL. The specific name honours the radio and telegraph operator and sports fisherman C. Verrycken of Banana Creek in the Democratic Republic of the Congo Poll said collected "many interesting specimens" for him.
