= Mud blenny =

Conservation status
- Vulnerable (IUCN 3.1)

Scientific classification
- Kingdom: Animalia
- Phylum: Chordata
- Class: Actinopterygii
- Order: Blenniiformes
- Family: Blenniidae
- Genus: Parablennius
- Species: P. lodosus

Binomial name
- Parablennius lodosus (J. L. B. Smith, 1959)

Synonyms
- Blennius lodosus J. L. B. Smith, 1959

Species of fish

The mud blenny (Parablennius lodosus) is a species of combtooth blenny found in the western Indian Ocean, it is known only from Delagoa Bay in Mozambique. This species reaches a length of 4 centimetres (1.6 in) SL. It occurs along shallow, rocky shores down to depths of 5 metres (16 ft).
