= Parablennius sierraensis =

Conservation status
- Least Concern (IUCN 3.1)

Scientific classification
- Kingdom: Animalia
- Phylum: Chordata
- Class: Actinopterygii
- Order: Blenniiformes
- Family: Blenniidae
- Genus: Parablennius
- Species: P. sierraensis

Binomial name
- Parablennius sierraensis Bath, 1990

Species of fish

Parablennius sierraensis is a species of combtooth blenny found in the Eastern and Central Atlantic: Cape Verde and the Gambia to Namibe, Angola. The species name refers to Sierra Leone, the type location. However, the IUCN give the southern limit of the distribution as being Sierra Leone.
