= Cheekspot blenny =

Conservation status
- Least Concern (IUCN 3.1)

Scientific classification
- Kingdom: Animalia
- Phylum: Chordata
- Class: Actinopterygii
- Order: Blenniiformes
- Family: Blenniidae
- Genus: Parablennius
- Species: P. opercularis

Binomial name
- Parablennius opercularis (J. A. Murray, 1887)

Synonyms
- Salarias opercularis J. A. Murray, 1887

Species of fish

The cheekspot blenny (Parablennius opercularis) is a species of combtooth blenny found in the western Indian Ocean, in the Persian Gulf, Gulf of Oman and adjacent parts of the Indian Ocean. This species reaches a length of from 6 centimetres (2.4 in) TL.
