= Jean Louis Florent Polydore Roux =

French naturalist (1792–1833)

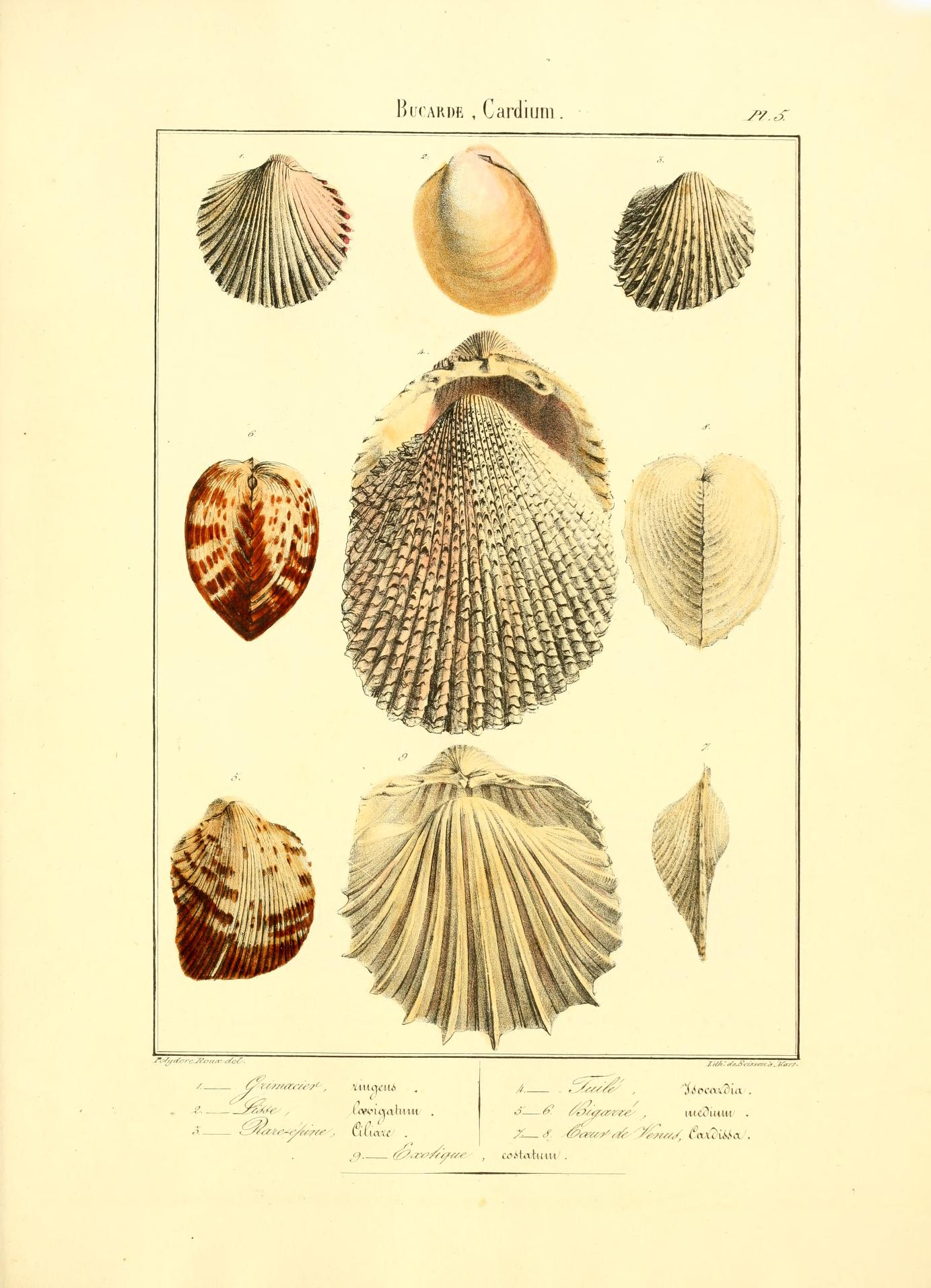
Plate from Iconographie conchyliologique

Jean Louis Florent Polydore Roux (27 July 1792, Marseille −12 April 1833, Bombay) was a French painter and naturalist.

Jean-Louis-Florent-Polydore Roux was, from his childhood, interested in natural history and had a large insect collection. He was taught by Pierre André Latreille and Georges Cuvier at Académie des sciences de l'Institut de France in Paris and was in 1819 appointed curator of the Muséum d'histoire naturelle de Marseille. He published Catalogue d’insectes de Provence, 1820 a 2 volume work on birds Ornithologie provençale, 1833 and Crustacés de la Méditerranée et de son littoral, 1828–30, which including 45 coloured plates, which he himself had made. He also published on molluscs Iconographie conchyliologique, 1828.Marine painting was another of his occupations and a Roux family concern. Roux was a correspondent of Risso who in 1826 named the copepod Pandarus rouxi after him. In 1831 he joined Charles von Hügel, who was travelling for the Austrian government, on an excursion to Egypt and from there in 1832 to Bombay, where he later died of plague.

A species of Indian lizard, Monilesaurus rouxii, is named in his honour. It is also likely that the specific name of the longstriped blenny (Parablennius rouxi) honours Roux.
