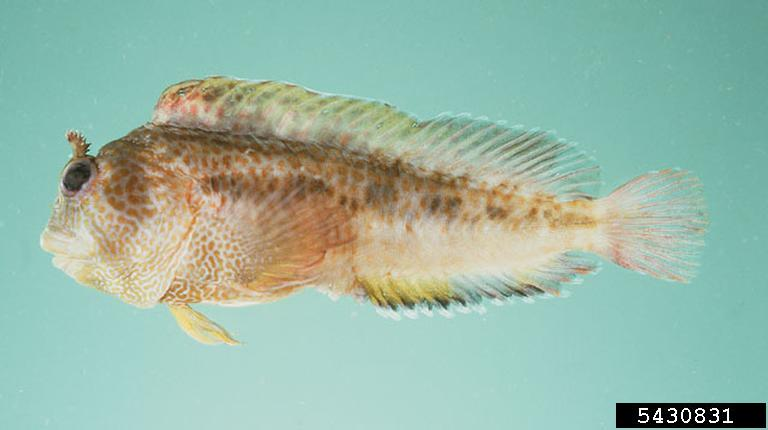

Conservation status
- Least Concern (IUCN 3.1)

Scientific classification
- Kingdom: Animalia
- Phylum: Chordata
- Class: Actinopterygii
- Order: Blenniiformes
- Family: Blenniidae
- Genus: Parablennius
- Species: P. thysanius

Binomial name
- Parablennius thysanius (D. S. Jordan & Seale, 1907)

Synonyms
- Blennius thysanius Jordan & Seale, 1907

= Tasseled blenny =

Species of fish

The tasseled blenny (Parablennius thysanius) is a species of combtooth blenny native to the Indo-West Pacific. A single specimen was reported in 2013 in the Mediterranean Sea off Antalya, Turkey. This species reaches a length of 6.2 centimetres (2.4 in) TL.
