= Parablennius salensis =

Conservation status
- Least Concern (IUCN 3.1)

Scientific classification
- Kingdom: Animalia
- Phylum: Chordata
- Class: Actinopterygii
- Order: Blenniiformes
- Family: Blenniidae
- Genus: Parablennius
- Species: P. salensis

Binomial name
- Parablennius salensis Bath, 1990

Species of fish

Parablennius salensis is a species of combtooth blenny found in the eastern central Atlantic ocean near the coasts of Cape Verde. It was first named and described by Hans Bath in 1990. This species reaches a length of 6 centimetres (2.4 in) TL.

== Etymology ==
The species name salensis refers to the island of Sal (Cape Verde), the type location. Its common name in Portuguese and Capeverdean Creole is "mané-cabeça".
