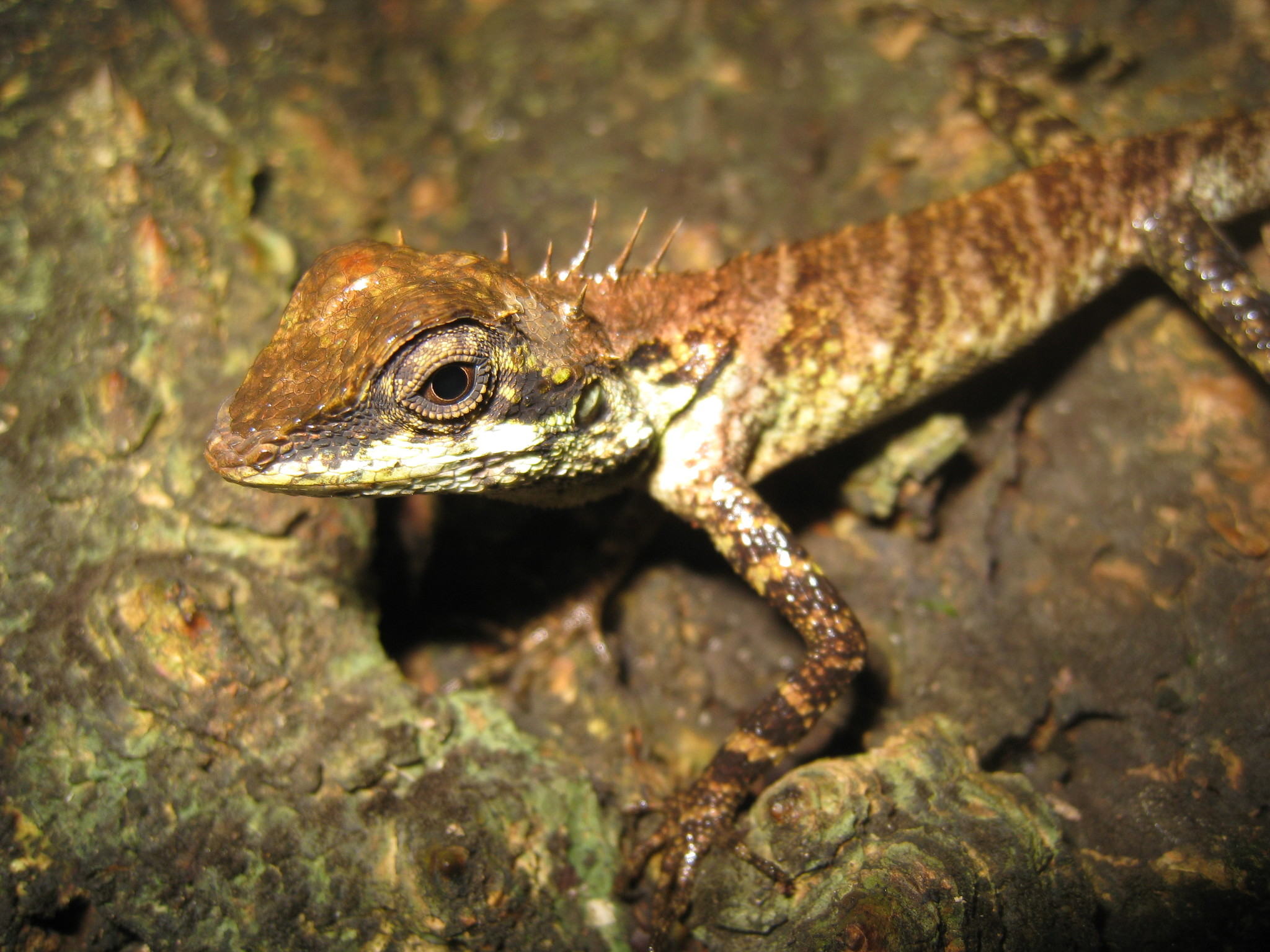

Conservation status
- Least Concern (IUCN 3.1)

Scientific classification
- Kingdom: Animalia
- Phylum: Chordata
- Class: Reptilia
- Order: Squamata
- Suborder: Iguania
- Family: Agamidae
- Genus: Monilesaurus
- Species: M. ellioti

Binomial name
- Monilesaurus ellioti Günther, 1864

Subspecies
- Calotes ellioti amarambalamensis Murthy, 1978; Calotes ellioti ellioti Günther, 1864
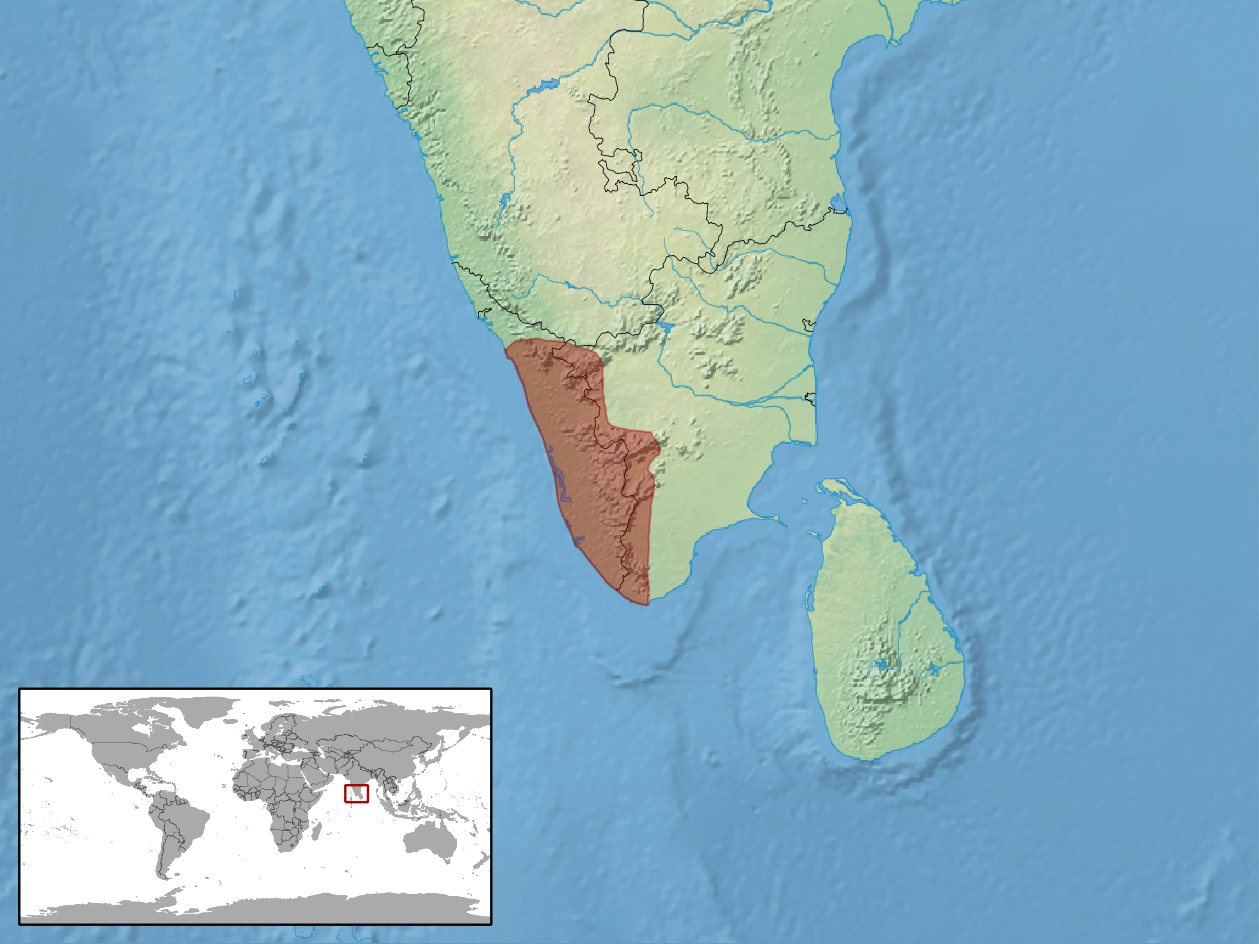

Synonyms
- Calotes elliotti [sic] Günther, 1864; Bronchocela indica Theobald, 1876; Calotes elliotti [sic] — Boulenger, 1885; Calotes ellioti [sic] — Boulenger, 1890; Monilesaurus ellioti [sic] — Pal et al. 2018

= Monilesaurus ellioti =

Species of lizard

Monilesaurus ellioti, also known commonly as Elliot's forest lizard, is a species of arboreal, diurnal, lizard in the family Agamidae. The species is endemic to the Western Ghats, India.

== Etymology ==
The specific name, ellioti, is in honor of Scottish naturalist Walter Elliot.

== Geographic range ==
Endemic to the Western Ghats of India, M. ellioti is found in Anaimalai, Agasthyamalai, Cardamom Hills, Palni Hills, Nilgiris, Waynad, Coorg and Kudremukh.

== Habitat ==
M. ellioti inhabits rainforest and adjacent plantations like coffee, cardamom and tea estates and even in Areca and vanilla plantations, from sea level to 1,100 m (3,600 ft).

== Description ==
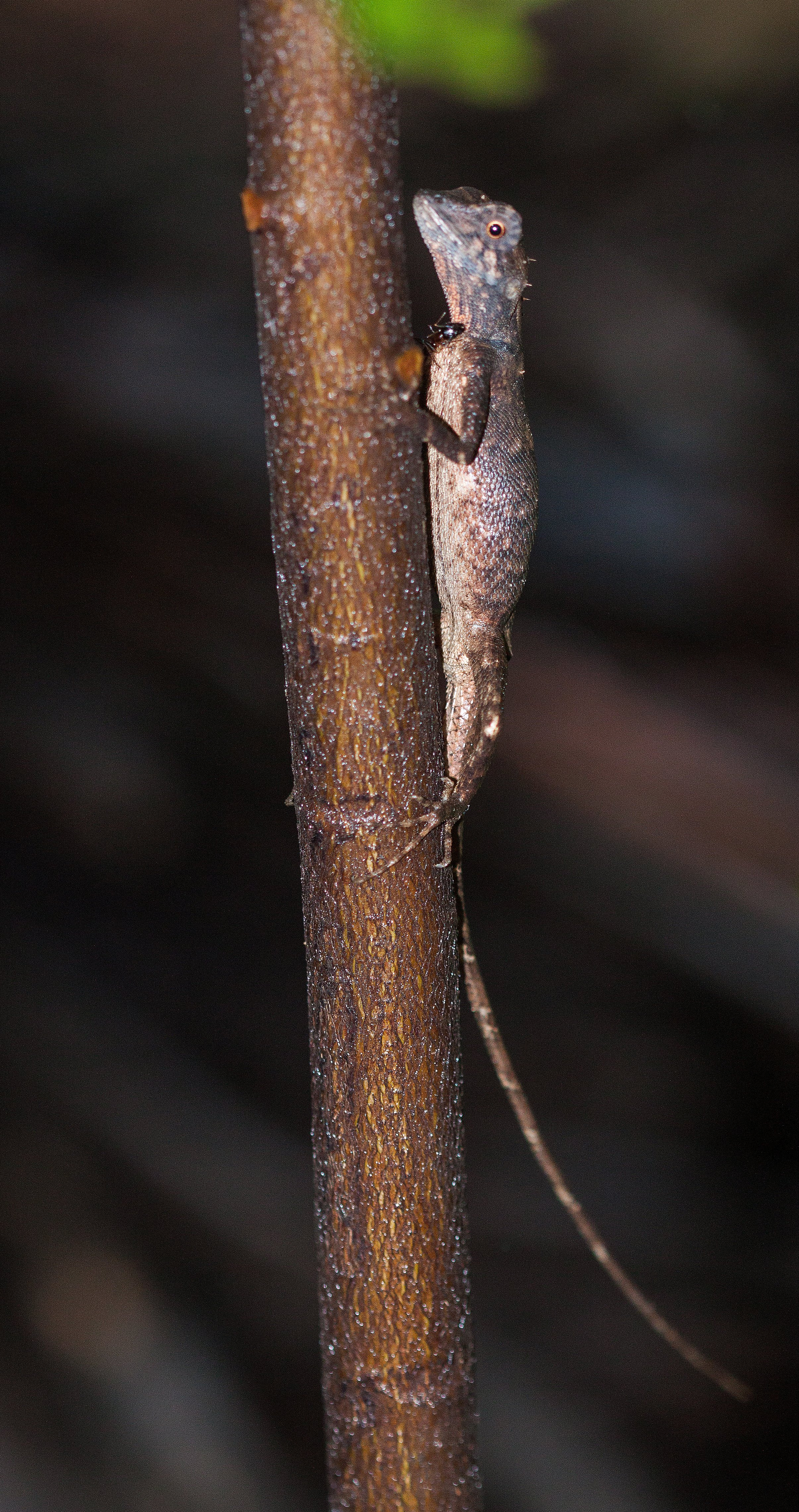
Lateral view

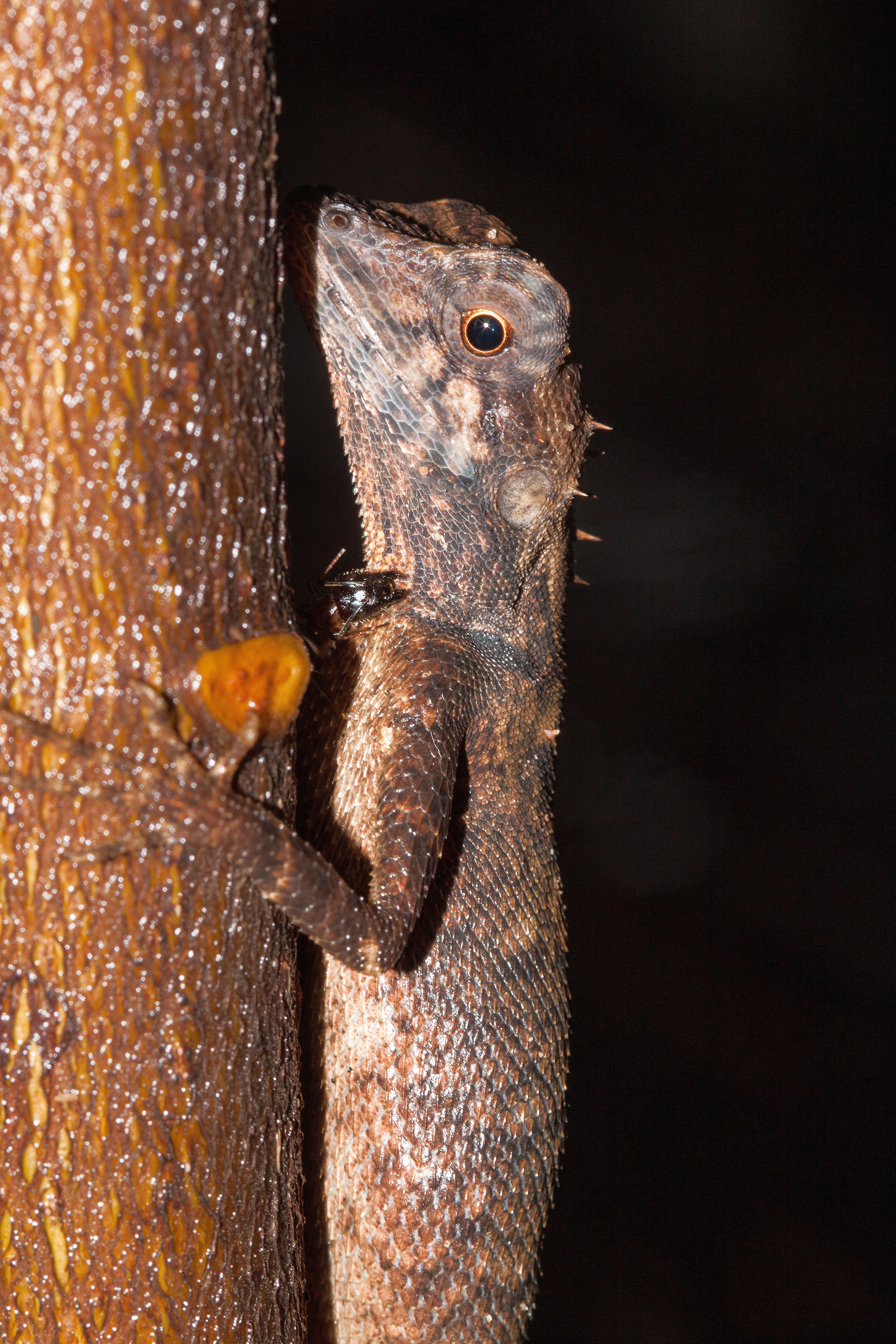
Head

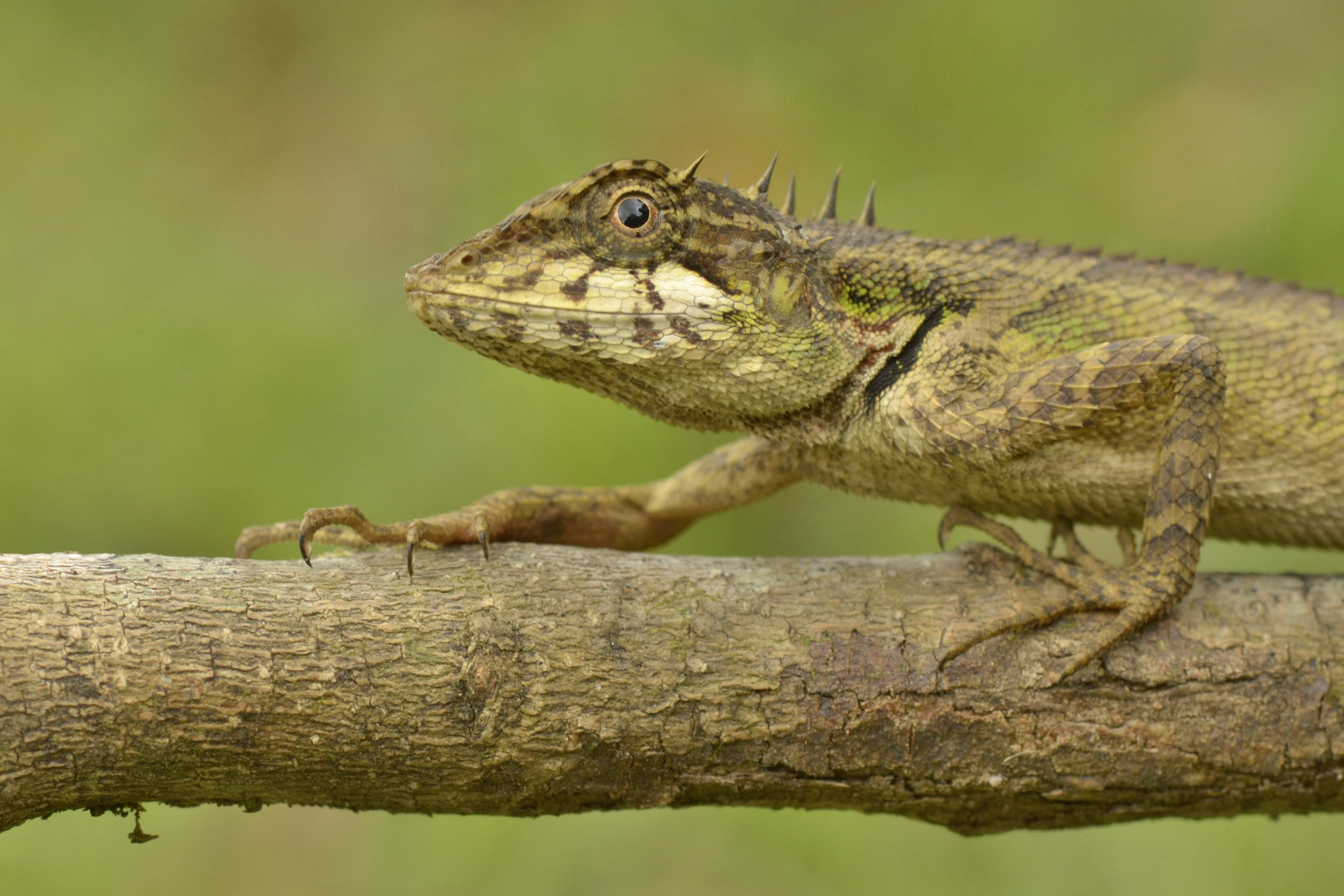
Head

The upper head-scales of M. ellioti are feebly keeled, imbricate, and much enlarged on the supraorbital region. There is a small spine behind the supraciliary edge, and two others on each side, the anterior midway between the nuchal crest and the tympanum, the posterior just above the latter, which measures nearly half the diameter of the orbit. The gular sac is not developed. The gular scales are strongly keeled, smaller than the ventrals. There is a strong oblique fold or pit in front of the shoulder, and a transverse gular fold. The nuchal crest is composed of a few widely separated slender spines, the longest of which measures about two thirds the diameter of the orbit. The dorsal crest is a mere denticulation. There are 53 to 61 scales round the middle of the body. The loreal scales are of nearly the same size as the ventrals, keeled, the uppermost with the points directed straight backwards, the others directed downwards and backwards. The ventral scales are strongly keeled. The adpressed hind limb reaches the anterior border of the orbit or the tip of the snout. The fourth finger is longer than the third. The tail is scarcely compressed. M. ellioti is olive above, with more or less distinct angular dark-brown cross bands on the body. There is an angular black mark on each side of the neck, and a white spot below the orbit. Dark lines radiate from the eye.

M. ellioti may attain a snout-to-vent length of 3 in (7.6 cm), with a tail length of 8.5 in (22 cm).

== Reproduction ==
M. ellioti is oviparous.
