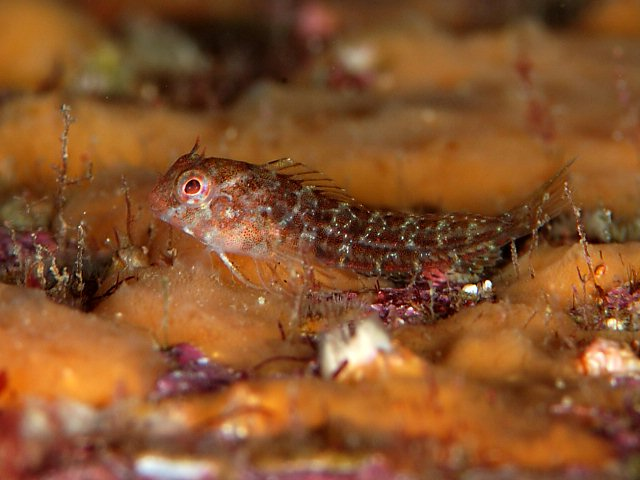

Conservation status
- Least Concern (IUCN 3.1)

Scientific classification
- Kingdom: Animalia
- Phylum: Chordata
- Class: Actinopterygii
- Order: Blenniiformes
- Family: Blenniidae
- Genus: Parablennius
- Species: P. yatabei

Binomial name
- Parablennius yatabei (D. S. Jordan & Snyder, 1900)

Synonyms
- Blennius yatabei D. S. Jordan & Snyder, 1900; Pictiblennius yatabei (D. S. Jordan & Snyder, 1900)

= Yatabe blenny =

Species of fish

The Yatabe blenny (Parablennius yatabei) is a species of combtooth blenny found in the northwest Pacific Ocean along the coasts of southern Japan and Korea. This species reaches a length of 9 centimetres (3.5 in) TL. The specific name was coined in memory of Jordan and Snyder's friend and fellow alumnus at Cornell University the botanist Riokichi Yatabe [1851-1899] who drowned in an accident while on holiday in Japan.
