= Monilesaurus montanus =

Conservation status
- Least Concern (IUCN 3.1)

Scientific classification
- Kingdom: Animalia
- Phylum: Chordata
- Class: Reptilia
- Order: Squamata
- Suborder: Iguania
- Family: Agamidae
- Genus: Monilesaurus
- Species: M. montanus

Binomial name
- Monilesaurus montanus Pal, Vijayakumar, Shanker, Jayarajan, & Deepak, 2018

Species of lizard

Monilesaurus montanus is a species of agamid lizard. It is endemic to India.
