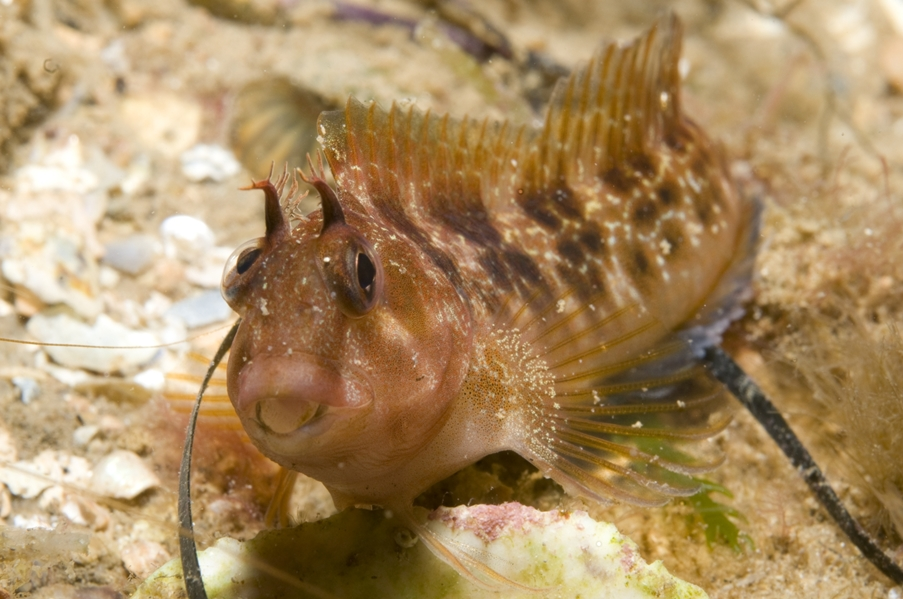

Conservation status
- Least Concern (IUCN 3.1)

Scientific classification
- Kingdom: Animalia
- Phylum: Chordata
- Class: Actinopterygii
- Order: Blenniiformes
- Family: Blenniidae
- Genus: Parablennius
- Species: P. tasmanianus

Binomial name
- Parablennius tasmanianus (J. Richardson, 1842)

Synonyms
- Blennius maoricus Kner, 1864; Blennius tasmanianus J. Richardson, 1842; Blennius victoriae Fowler, 1908; Parablennius tasmanianus caledoniensis Bath, 1989

= Tasmanian blenny =

Species of fish

The Tasmanian blenny (Parablennius tasmanianus) is a species of combtooth blenny found in the eastern Indian Ocean (Australia) to Southwest Pacific (New Zealand). This species reaches a length of 13 centimetres (5.1 in) TL. It is a herbivore which feeds mainly on algae and is common around man-made structures, such as jetties, and in tidal pools.
