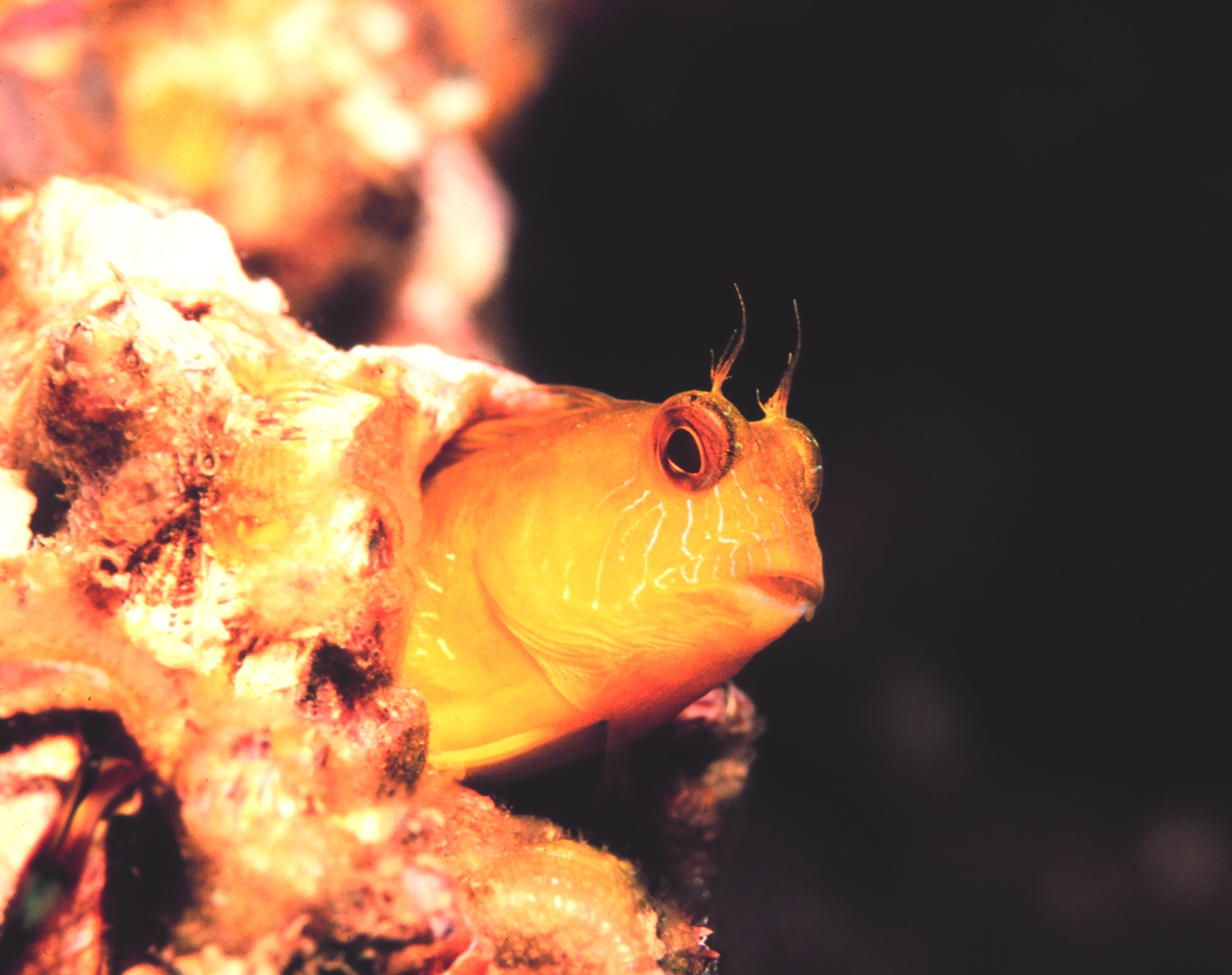

Conservation status
- Least Concern (IUCN 3.1)

Scientific classification
- Kingdom: Animalia
- Phylum: Chordata
- Class: Actinopterygii
- Division: Teleostei
- Order: Blenniiformes
- Family: Blenniidae
- Genus: Parablennius
- Species: P. marmoreus

Binomial name
- Parablennius marmoreus (Poey, 1876)

Synonyms
- Blennius marmoreus Poey, 1876

= Seaweed blenny =

Species of fish

The seaweed blenny (Parablennius marmoreus) is a species of combtooth blenny found in coral reefs in the western Atlantic Ocean along the coasts of New York, Bermuda, the Bahamas, also in the Gulf of Mexico, south to southern Brazil. This species reaches a length of 8.5 centimetres (3.3 in) TL.

== Description ==
The seaweed blenny has a blunt head, a beak-like snout and a long, slender body. It grows to a maximum length of about 8.5 centimetres (3.3 in). The mouth contains about forty comb-like incisors and above the eyes there are tufts of branched cirri (slender, fleshy structures). The gill slits are continuous across the throat. The dorsal fin has twelve spines and eighteen soft rays, the anal fin has two spines and nineteen or twenty soft rays and the tail fin is rounded. The color is somewhat variable, being some shade of gold, green, tan or rust, blotched at regular intervals with dark brown mottling. The top of the head is bronze and there is a dark stripe starting above the eye, broadening above the pectoral fin and gradually becoming fainter towards the caudal peduncle. Some individuals have a blue spot near the front of the dorsal fin. The fish can adapt its coloration to suit its surroundings in order to camouflage itself. The border of the anal fins and the underside of the fish are whitish.

== Distribution and habitat ==
The seaweed blenny is native to shallow waters in the western Atlantic Ocean. Its range extends from New York southwards to Brazil, and includes the Caribbean Sea, the Gulf of Mexico, Bermuda and the Bahamas at depths down to about 10 m (33 ft). A typical habitat is among limestone boulders and in scoops and basins where the rock surface is covered with a mat of algae, sea fans and other invertebrates. It is also found on reefs, in seagrass meadows and oyster beds, as well as around human-made structures such as pilings, jetties, seawalls, oil rigs and buoys, and among the roots of mangroves.

== Biology ==
The seaweed blenny is a diurnal species and feeds mostly on algae. The diet also includes such invertebrates as polychaete worms, crustaceans and hydroids, which it picks off the substrate with its beak-like mouth. A male may have several females in his territory, all of which deposit their eggs in a shared nest. This is in a crevice in a rock, inside a sponge, in a mollusc shell or in a can or other piece of discarded human debris. The male guards the nest until the eggs hatch. The larvae are planktonic at first, settling on the seabed when about 20 mm (0.8 in) long.
