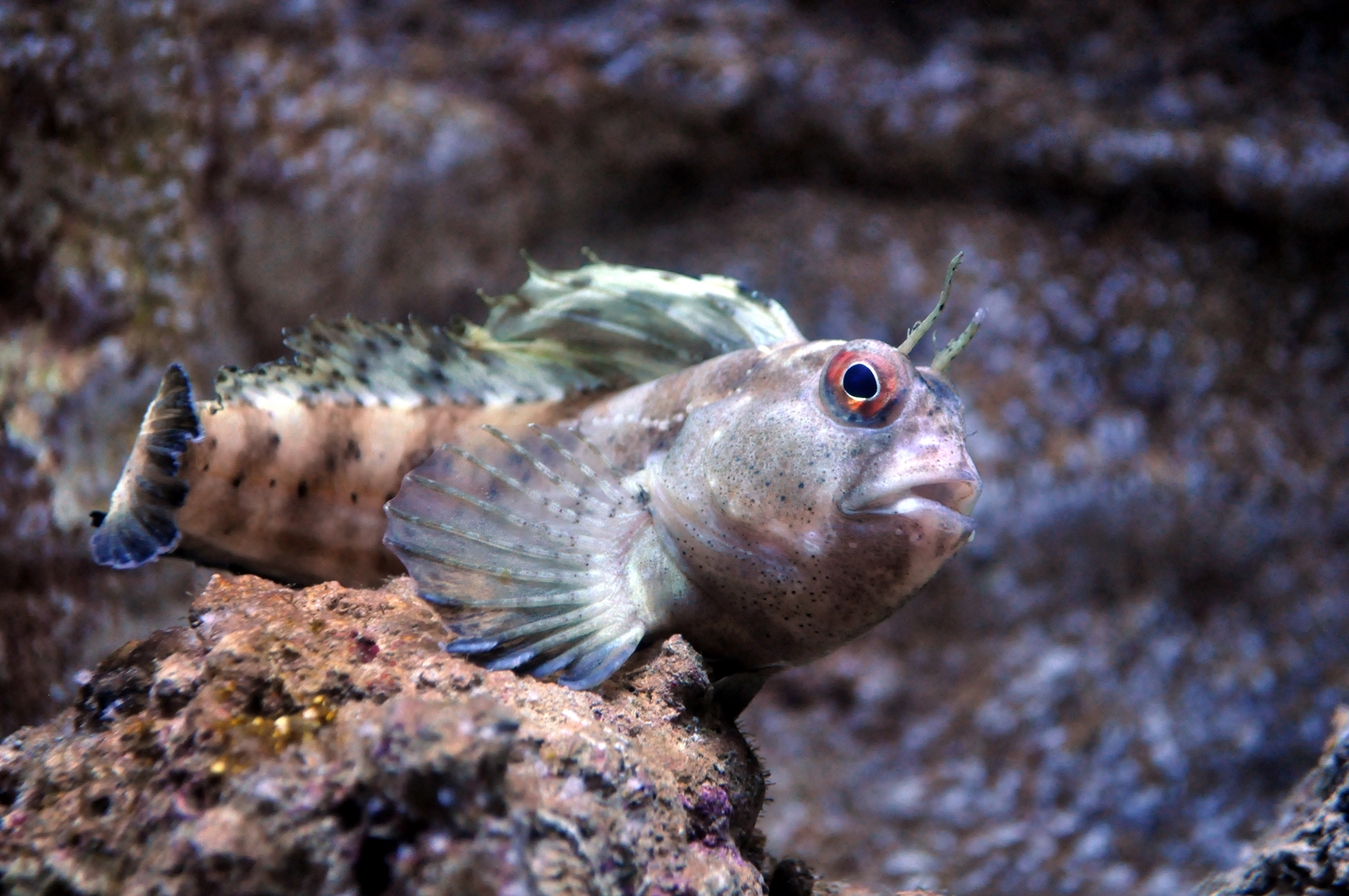

Conservation status
- Least Concern (IUCN 3.1)

Scientific classification
- Kingdom: Animalia
- Phylum: Chordata
- Class: Actinopterygii
- Order: Blenniiformes
- Family: Blenniidae
- Genus: Parablennius
- Species: P. gattorugine

Binomial name
- Parablennius gattorugine (Linnaeus, 1758)

Synonyms
- Blennius gattorugine Linnaeus, 1758; Blennius ruber Valenciennes, 1836; Blennius varus Pallas, 1814; Parablennius gattorougine Linnaeus, 1758

= Tompot blenny =

Species of fish

The tompot blenny (Parablennius gattorugine) is a species of combtooth blenny from the north eastern Atlantic Ocean which is found in shallow, coastal waters off western Europe, the Mediterranean and North Africa.

== Description ==
The tompot blenny is a relatively large blenny with an elongated body, large head and large eyes which grows to up to 30 centimetres (12 in) in length. The eyes are bicoloured with their top part being brown and the bottom part is white. There is a single branched tentacle over each of its eyes. It is mainly yellow-brown in colour, although occasionally it is greenish and is marked with at least seven dark bars starting at the dorsal fin and which reach the belly. As well as the tentacles over the eyes there are also tentacles over the nostrils. The lateral line is continuous but becomes broken towards the tail. The breeding males become chocolate brown in colour and develop bulb-like glands on the spines of the anal fin. The dorsal fin runs the length of its body and is divided into two halves by a shallow notch. The anterior portion of the fin is contains the spiny rays while the posterior portion contains the soft rays. The dorsal fin has 13–14 spines and 17–20 ray while the anal fin has 2 spines and 19–23 rays. It has relatively large pectoral fins. Each individual has a unique set of markings on the scales of the face which mean that studies of their biology can identify individuals.

== Distribution ==
The tompot blenny is found along the Atlantic coast of Europe from southern England and Ireland to Morocco. It is also found throughout the Mediterranean Sea to the Sea of Marmara and the Black Sea. In Great Britain it is mainly recorded off the south and west coasts and is largely absent from the North Sea coasts, although it has been seen on wrecks off the North Norfolk coast. and off eastern Scotland as far north as the Shetland Islands.

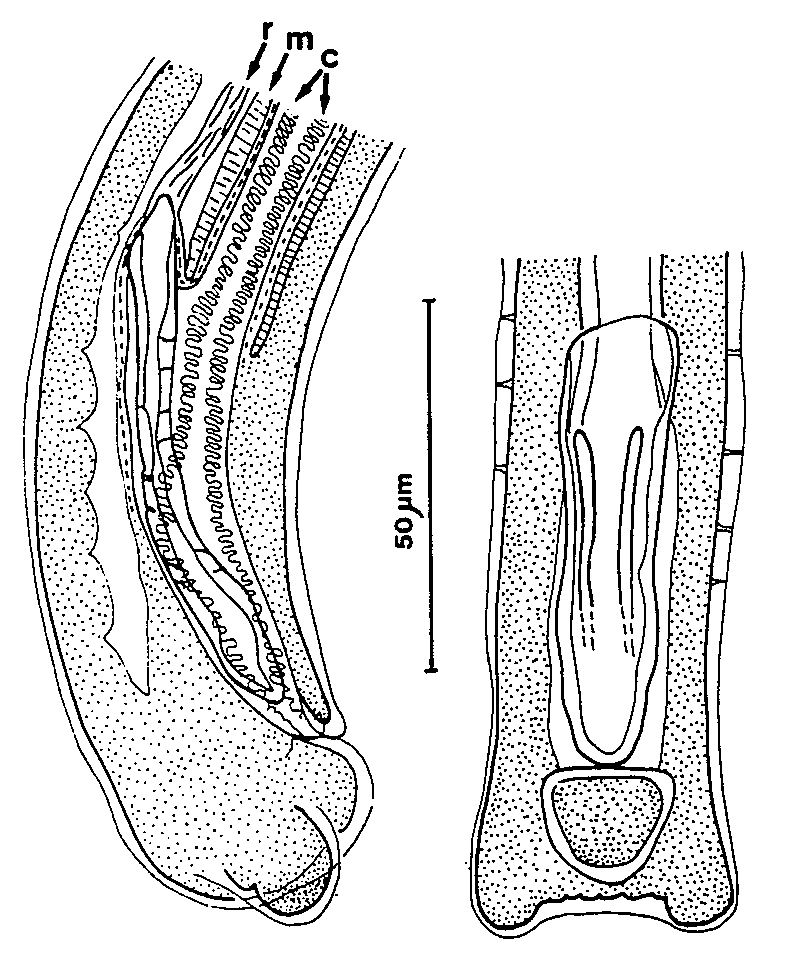
Pseudocapillaria bainae, parasite of Parablennius gattorugine. Caudal extremity of the male

== Habitat and biology ==
=== Habitat ===
Tompot blennies are very territorial and their territories are centred around a crevice in the rocky reef which the fish uses for shelter. They occur in shallow seas at depths of 3–32 metres (9.8–105.0 ft) although smaller specimens occur in rockpools. They may be found above the low tide mark at very low tides, sheltering under boulders or among exposed vegetation.

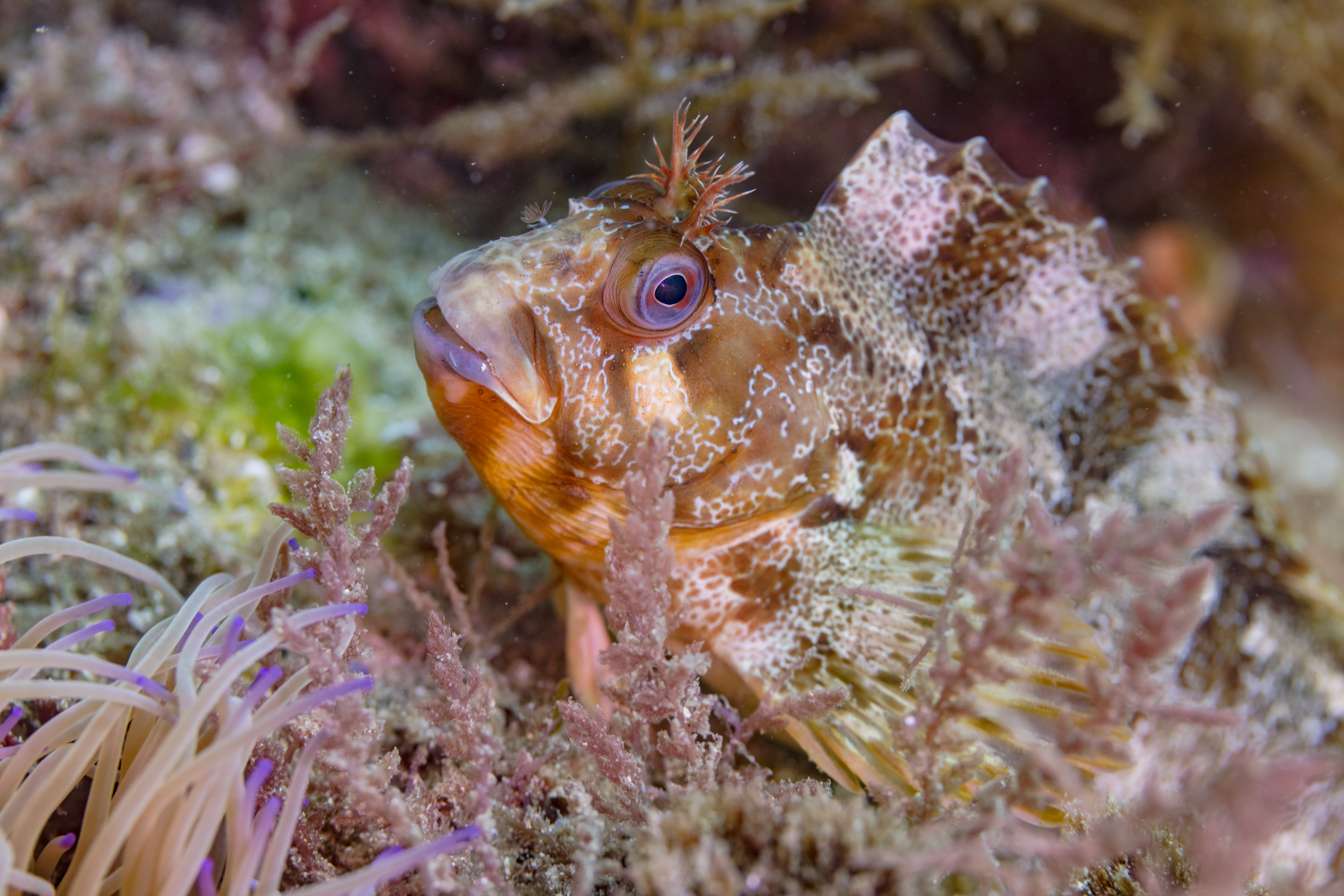
Image from the side, in Arrábida National Park, Portugal.

=== Feeding ===
Tompot blennies have sharp, comb-like teeth which they use to scrape food from the substrate. They feed on sea anemones and on other invertebrates such as prawns and other crustaceans. They are crepuscular, being active mainly at dawn and at dusk.

=== Parasites ===
As most fish, tompot blennies harbour several species of parasites, including the capillariid Nematode Pseudocapillaria bainae. This parasite has been found in the intestine of specimens caught off Italy and Montenegro. Its biology is unknown.

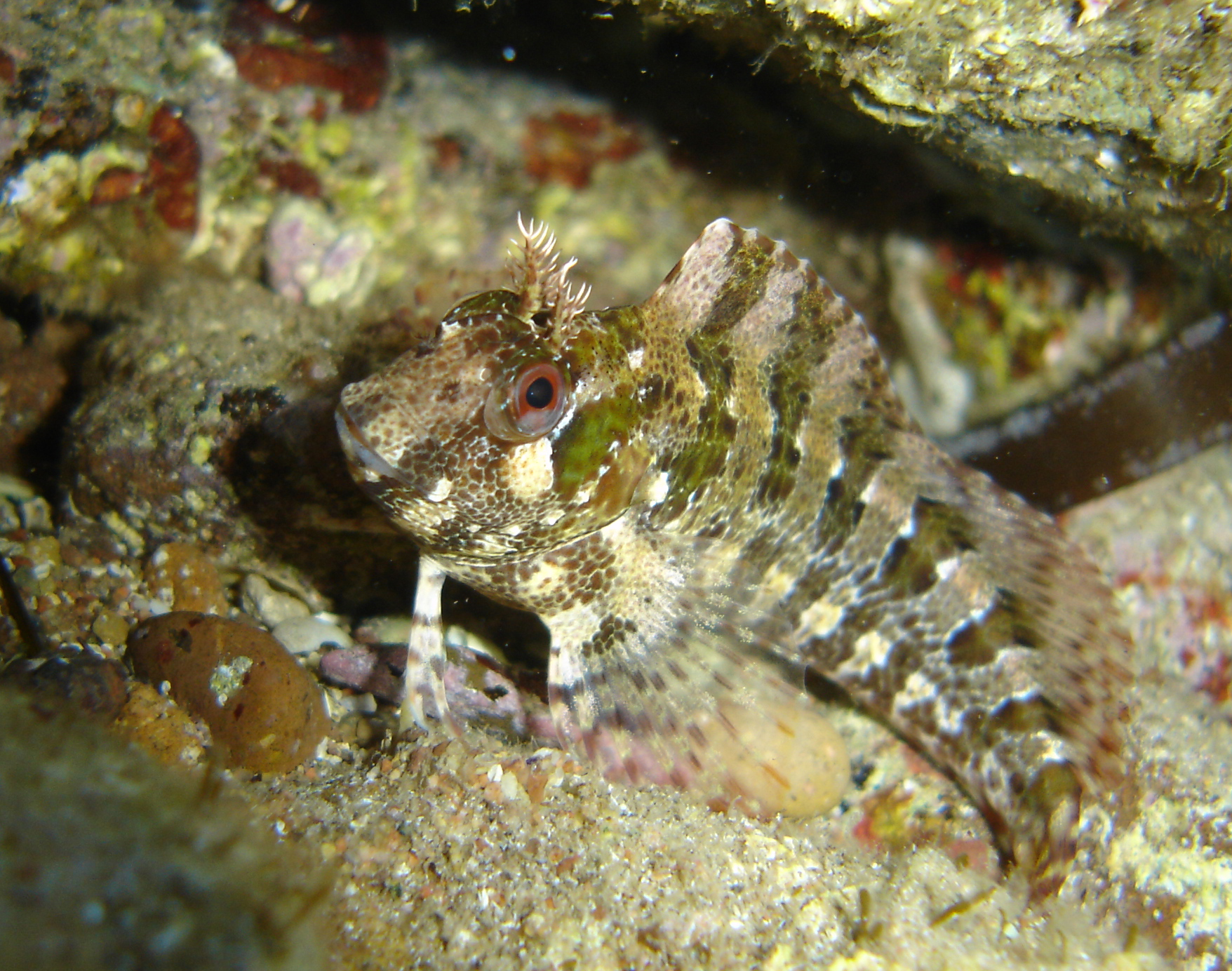
Parablennius gattorugine

=== Breeding ===
Tompot blennies spawn in March to May the males mate with a number of females and guards their eggs. The eggs are demersal and like those of all blennies they stick to the substrate by a filamentous adhesive patch. The male guards the eggs until the larvae hatch, usually about a month after laying. The males defend their territories from other males and often fight each other, frequently receiving injuries. When breeding the males develop pale cauliflower like glands on their anal fins which are believed to play a role in attracting females and in cleaning the eggs.

== Name ==
The specific name was first used by Francis Willughby in 1688 after he had observed these blennies in Venice and heard them called gatto ruggine which he translated as "rusty cat" or "rust colour", although he was afraid that he did not fully understand the name. However the actual name is gatto rusola or gotto rosula which is a local name for blennies in general along the Adriatic coast of Italy and which is a diminutive of gotto roso meaning "thick throat".
