= Parablennius postoculomaculatus =

False Tasmanian blenny

Conservation status
- Least Concern (IUCN 3.1)

Scientific classification
- Kingdom: Animalia
- Phylum: Chordata
- Class: Actinopterygii
- Order: Blenniiformes
- Family: Blenniidae
- Genus: Parablennius
- Species: P. postoculomaculatus

Binomial name
- Parablennius postoculomaculatus Bath & Hutchins, 1986

Synonyms
- Parablennius tasmanianus postoculomaculatus Bath & Hutchins, 1986

Species of fish

Parablennius postoculomaculatus, the false Tasmanian blenny, is a species of demersal tropical combtooth blenny. It is native to western Australia.
