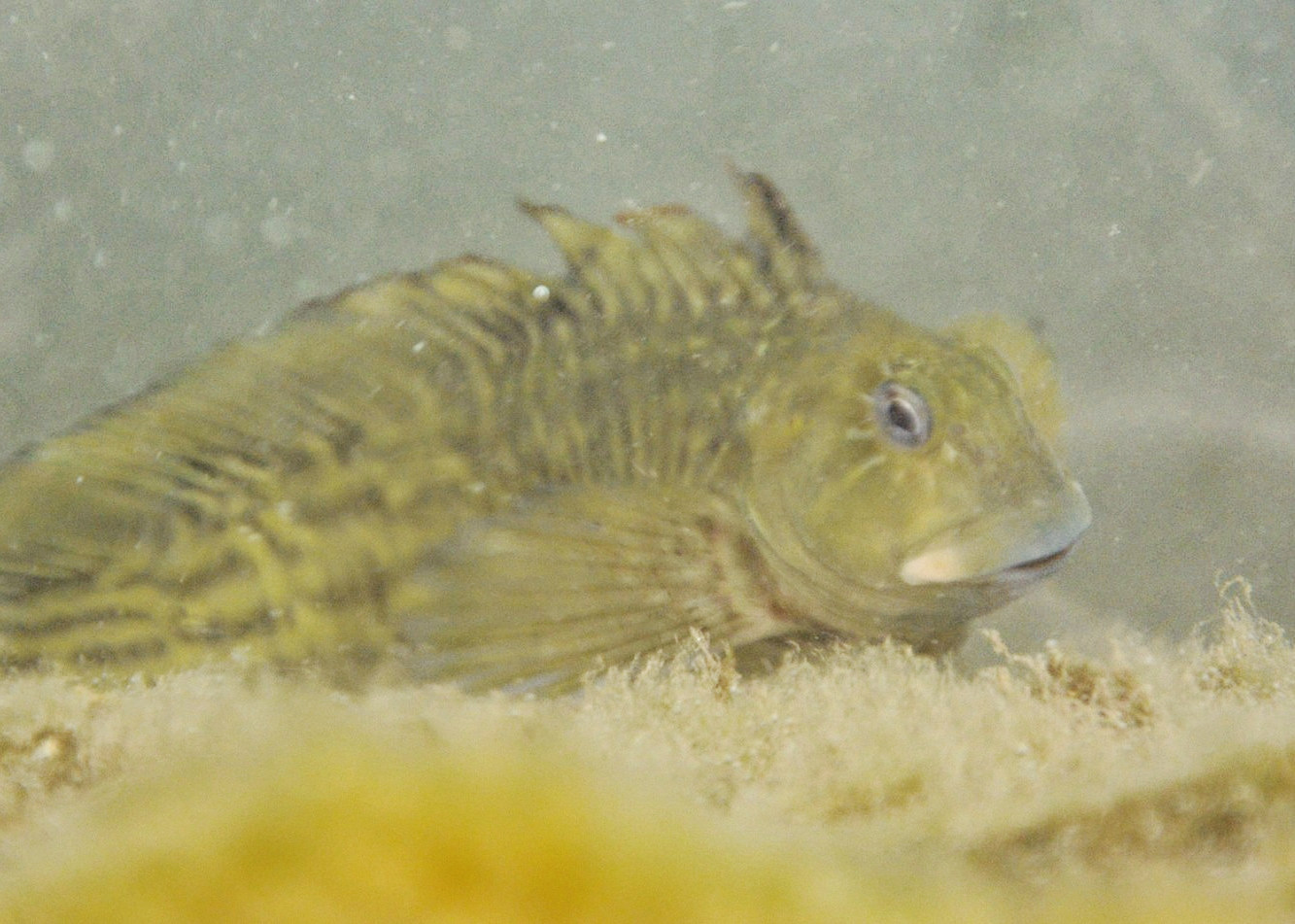

Conservation status
- Least Concern (IUCN 3.1)

Scientific classification
- Kingdom: Animalia
- Phylum: Chordata
- Class: Actinopterygii
- Order: Blenniiformes
- Family: Blenniidae
- Genus: Parablennius
- Species: P. parvicornis

Binomial name
- Parablennius parvicornis (Valenciennes, 1836)

Synonyms
- Blennius bouvieri Rochebrune, 1880; Blennius canariensis D. S. Jordan & Gunn, 1898; Blennius parvicornis Valenciennes, 1836; Blennius sanguinolentus (non Pallas, 1811); Pictiblennius parvicornis (Valenciennes, 1836)

= Rock-pool blenny =

Species of fish

The rock-pool blenny (Parablennius parvicornis) is a species of combtooth blenny found in the eastern central Atlantic Ocean. This species reaches a length of 12 centimetres (4.7 in) SL.

The fish is found in tidal hollows, rock pools, hence its English name. They are found in areas open to sunlight, between stones and thickets of seaweed. They mostly eat algae. It is found in Cape Verde, Canary Islands, Madeira and the Azores and along the coast of West Africa.
