= Parablennius cornutus =

Conservation status
- Least Concern (IUCN 3.1)

Scientific classification
- Kingdom: Animalia
- Phylum: Chordata
- Class: Actinopterygii
- Order: Blenniiformes
- Family: Blenniidae
- Genus: Parablennius
- Species: P. cornutus

Binomial name
- Parablennius cornutus (Linnaeus, 1758)

Synonyms
- Blennius cornutus Linnaeus, 1758; Blennius grandicornis Valenciennes, 1836; Blennius scullyi Gilchrist & W. W. Thompson, 1908; Pictiblennius cornutus (Linnaeus, 1758)

Species of fish

Parablennius cornutus, the horned blenny, is a species of combtooth blenny found in the southeast Atlantic ocean: northern Namibia to Sodwana Bay, South Africa. This species can reach a length of 15 centimetres (5.9 in) SL.
