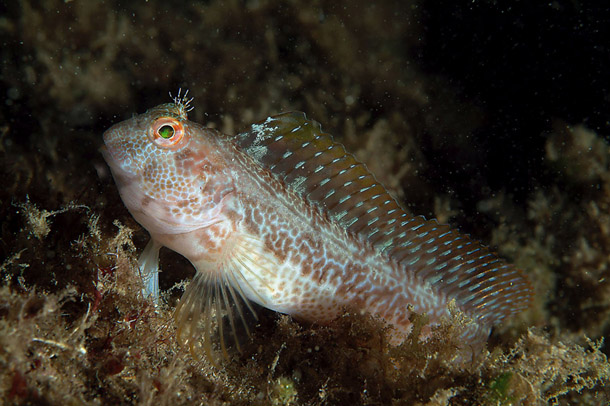
- Parablennius pilicornis is the type species of the genus

Scientific classification
- Kingdom: Animalia
- Phylum: Chordata
- Class: Actinopterygii
- Order: Blenniiformes
- Family: Blenniidae
- Subfamily: Salariinae
- Genus: Parablennius; A. Miranda-Ribeiro, 1915

Type species
- Parablennius pilicornis (Cuvier, 1829)

Species
- See text

Synonyms
- Pictiblennius Whitley, 1930; Zeablennius Whitley, 1930

= Parablennius =

Genus of fishes

Parablennius is a diverse genus of combtooth blennies found in the Atlantic, western Pacific, and Indian Ocean.

== Species ==
There are currently 26 recognized species in this genus:

- Parablennius cornutus (Linnaeus, 1758)
- Parablennius cyclops (Rüppell, 1830)
- Parablennius dialloi Bath, 1990
- Parablennius gattorugine (Linnaeus, 1758) – Tompot blenny
- Parablennius goreensis (Valenciennes, 1836)
- Parablennius incognitus (Bath, 1968) – Mystery blenny
- Parablennius intermedius (J. D. Ogilby, 1915) – Horned blenny
- Parablennius laticlavius (Griffin, 1926) – Crested blenny
- Parablennius lodosus (J. L. B. Smith, 1959) – Mud blenny
- Parablennius marmoreus (Poey, 1876) – Seaweed blenny
- Parablennius opercularis (J. A. Murray, 1887) – Cheekspot blenny
- Parablennius parvicornis (Valenciennes, 1836) – Rock-pool blenny
- Parablennius pilicornis (G. Cuvier, 1829) – Ringneck blenny
- Parablennius postoculomaculatus Bath & Hutchins, 1986 – False Tasmanian blenny
- Parablennius rouxi (Cocco, 1833) – Longstriped blenny
- Parablennius ruber (Valenciennes, 1836) – Portuguese blenny
- Parablennius salensis (Bath, 1990
- Parablennius sanguinolentus (Pallas, 1814) – Rusty blenny
- Parablennius serratolineatus Bath & Hutchins, 1986
- Parablennius sierraensis Bath, 1990
- Parablennius tasmanianus (J. Richardson, 1842) – Tasmanian blenny
- Parablennius tentacularis (Brünnich, 1768) – Tentacled blenny
- Parablennius thysanius (D. S. Jordan & Seale, 1907) – Tasseled blenny
- Parablennius verryckeni (Poll, 1959)
- Parablennius yatabei (D. S. Jordan & Snyder, 1900) – Yatabe blenny
- Parablennius zvonimiri (Kolombatović, 1892) – Zvonimir's blenny
