= Rock Pool (Newcastle) =

Outdoor swimming pool in Northern Ireland

Coordinates: 54°12′13″N 5°53′29″W

The Rock Pool is an open air, sea pool located in Newcastle, County Down, Northern Ireland. It was opened in 1933 and is the last of its kind still in operation in Ireland. The pool is owned and operated by Newry, Mourne and Down District Council (Down District Council prior to the local government reform which came into effect on 1 April 2015).

== History ==
The idea of an outdoor pool in Newcastle was first proposed in 1926 but was rejected by the Newcastle Urban District Council ratepayers because of the high cost of £8,500. However plans for a pool at a cost of £4,000 were approved in 1931, despite strong opposition. In February 1932, construction began at Blackrock and the pool was officially opened on 10 June 1933 by the Council Chairman J.P. Hastings and Lady Elizabeth Annesley.

The pool originally had diving boards and a chute. It also hosted annual galas, diving displays and water polo matches. The high diving board and the chute were removed in 1980. Around this time the pool started to focus more on life saving. This helped to increase the number of visitors that had been declining since the 1950s due to the increased popularity of indoor pools and package holidays. The annual gala also changed around this time to include the "Cross the Bay Swim", later known as The Harbour Swim.

== Closure ==
The Rock Pool has been threatened with closure on multiple occasions. In February 2015 approximately 2000 people successfully campaigned to stop the council from closing it due to budget cuts. Newry, Mourne and Down District Council stated that its closure would save £45,000 annually. The pool has been temporarily closed in the past due to poor water quality.
