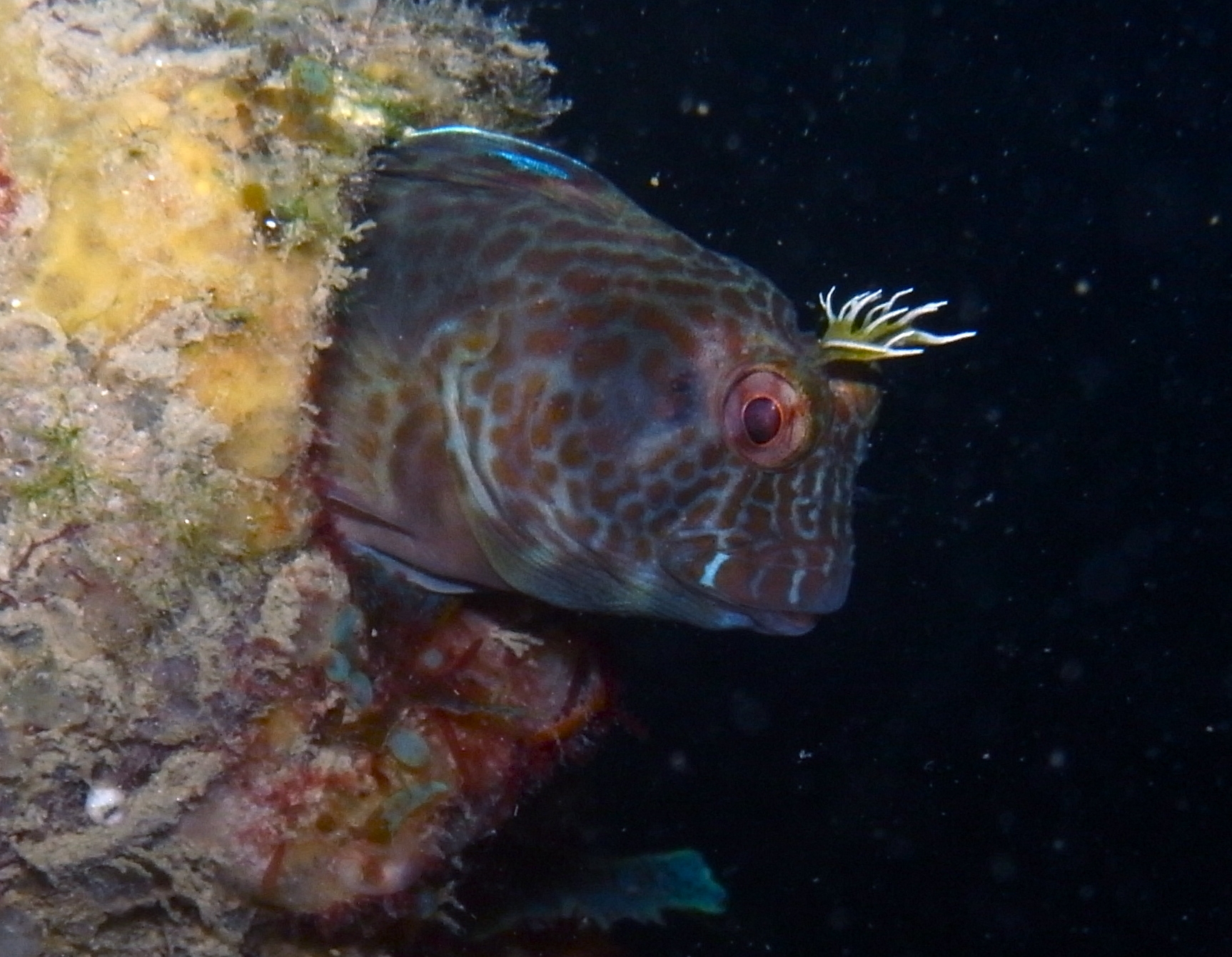

Conservation status
- Least Concern (IUCN 3.1)

Scientific classification
- Kingdom: Animalia
- Phylum: Chordata
- Class: Actinopterygii
- Order: Blenniiformes
- Family: Blenniidae
- Genus: Parablennius
- Species: P. intermedius

Binomial name
- Parablennius intermedius (J. D. Ogilby, 1915)

Synonyms
- Blennius intermedius J. D. Ogilby, 1915; Pictiblennius iredalei Whitley, 1931

= Parablennius intermedius =

Horned blenny

Species of fish

Parablennius intermedius, the false Tasmanian blenny or horned blenny, is a species of combtooth blenny found in the Indian ocean near Australian coasts. This species reaches a length of 12 centimetres (4.7 in) TL.
