= List of fishes of the Mediterranean Sea =

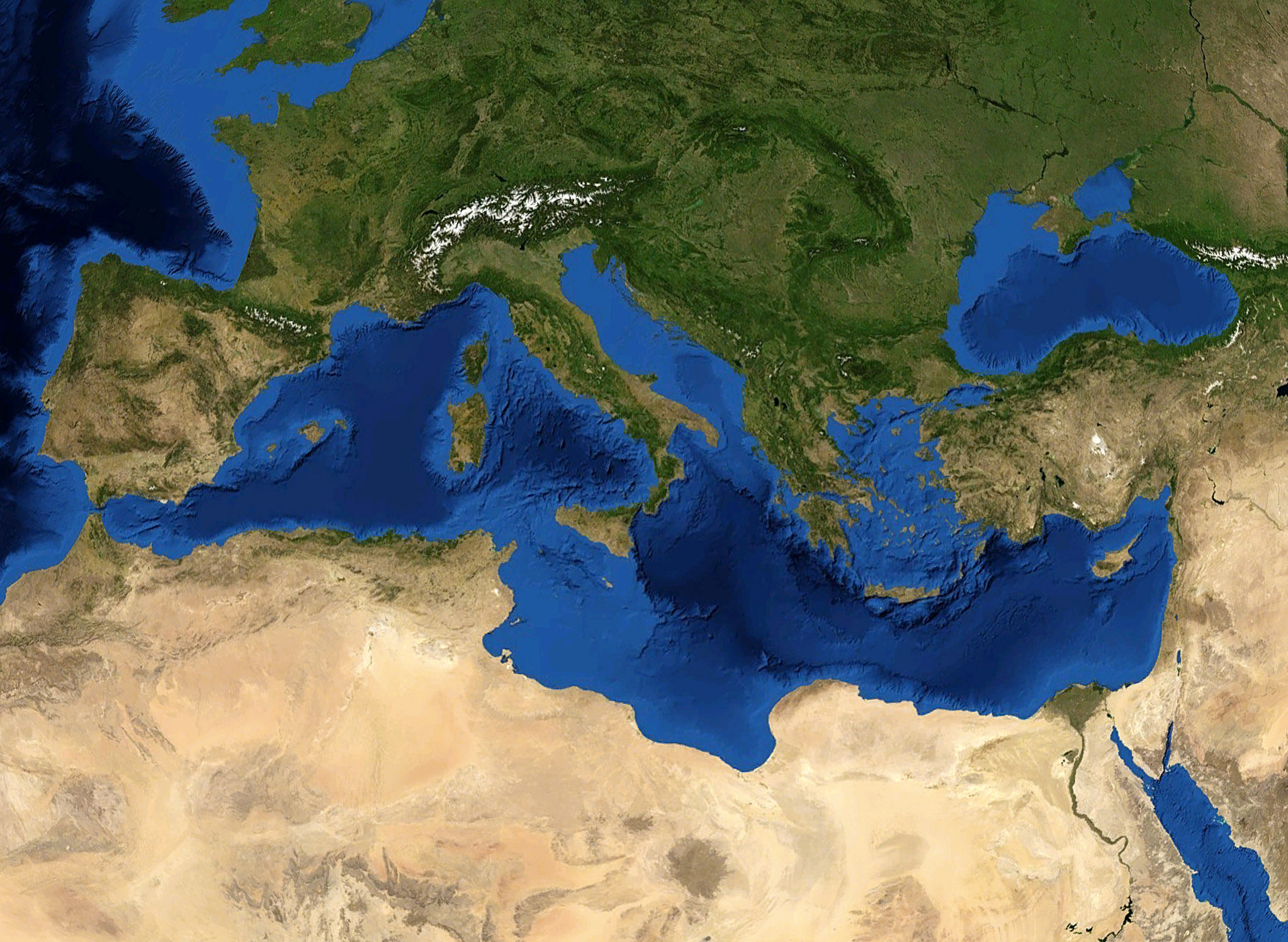

This list of fishes of the Mediterranean Sea consists of 712 species.

== Cyclostomata ==
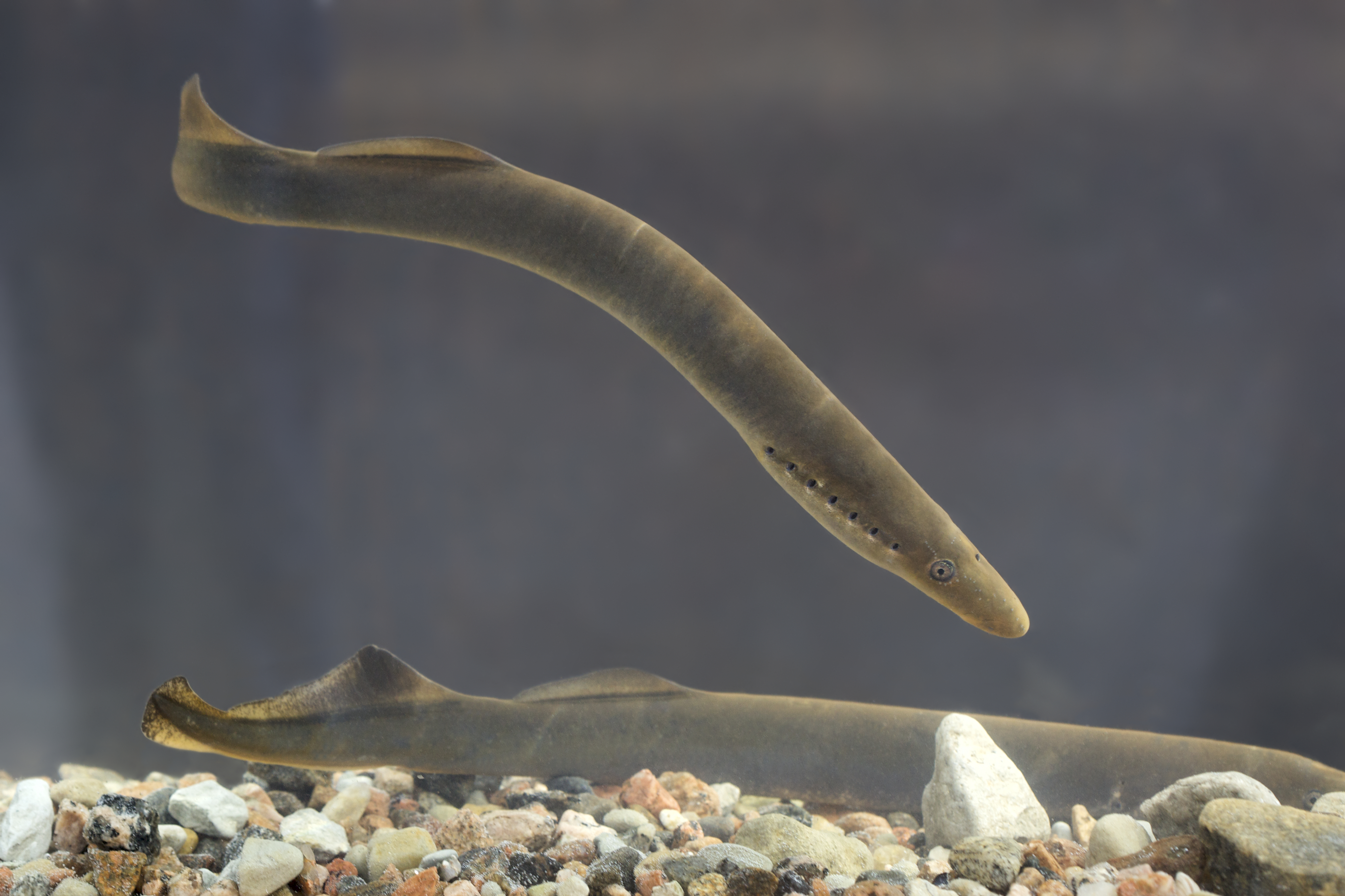
Lampetra fluviatilis

- Myxine glutinosa
- Lampetra fluviatilis
- Petromyzon marinus

== Chondrichthyes ==
=== Chimaeriformes ===
- Chimaera monstrosa

=== Shark ===
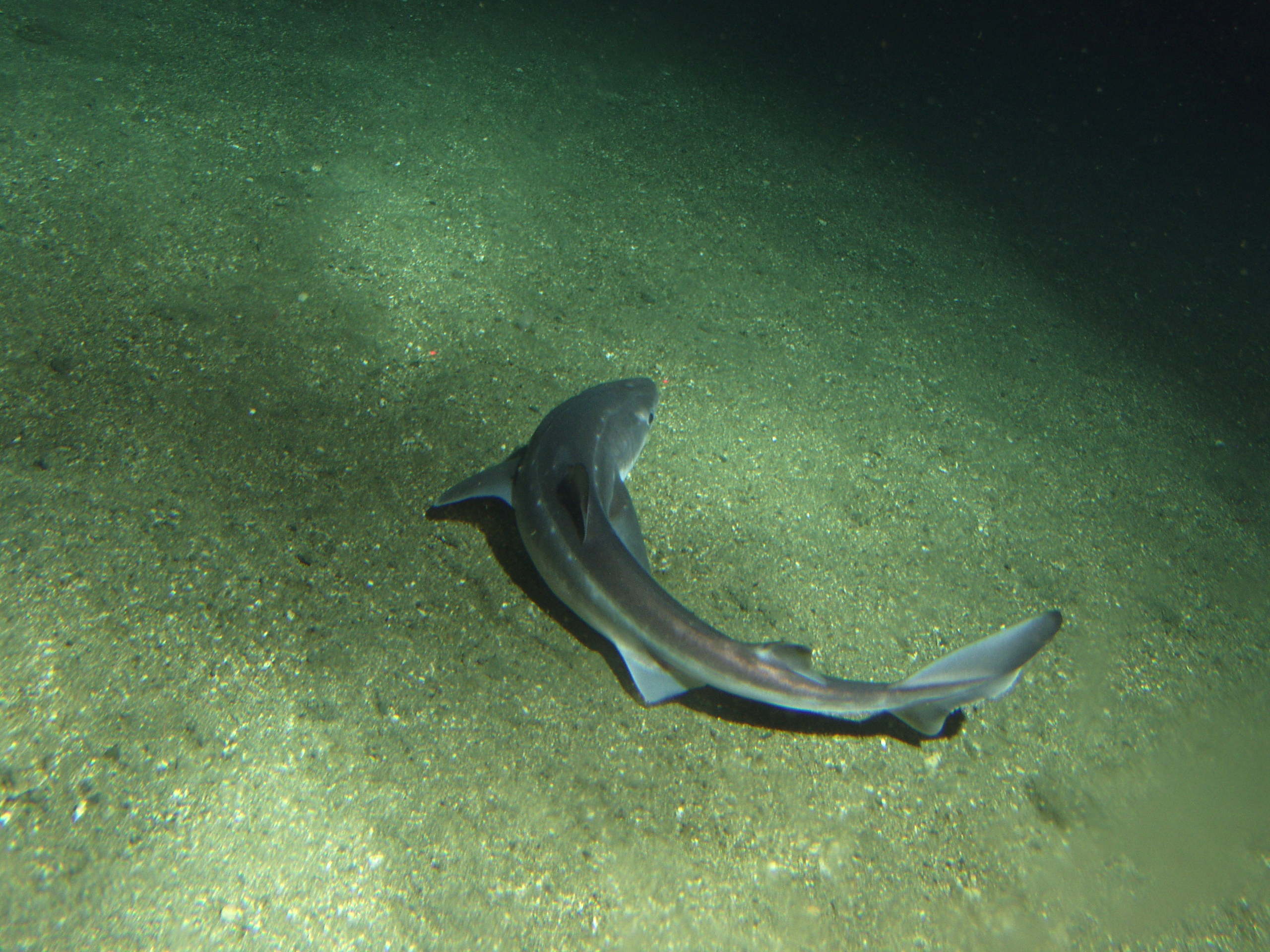
Echinorhinus brucus

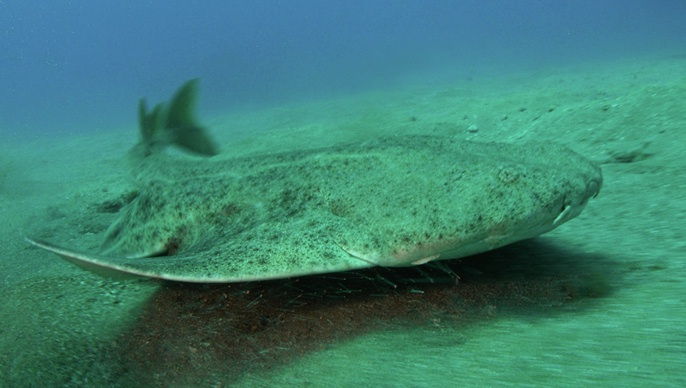
Squatina squatina

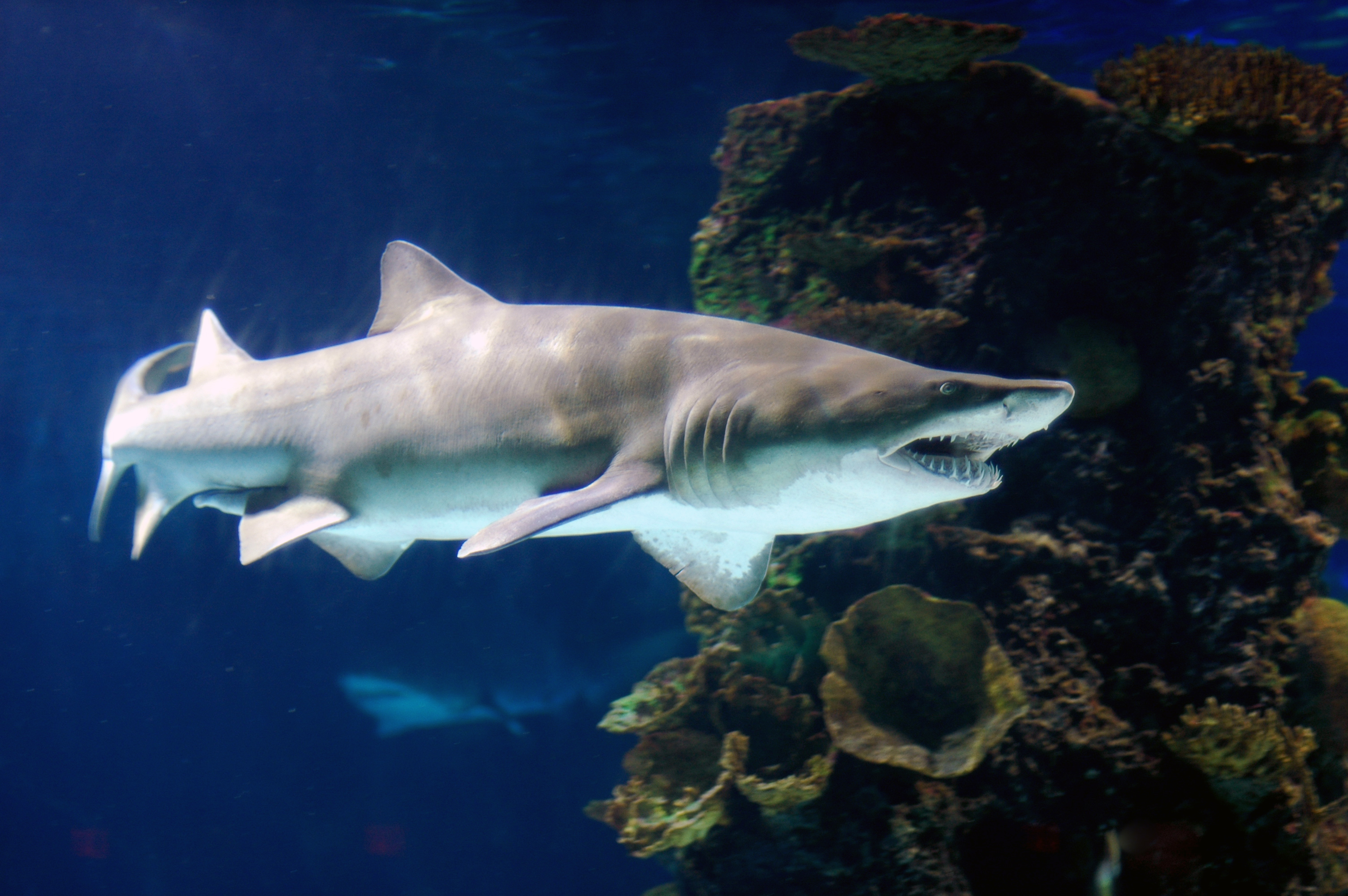
Carcharias taurus

- Sharpnose sevengill shark
- Bluntnose sixgill shark
- Bigeyed sixgill shark
- Bramble shark
- Gulper shark
- Dalatias licha
- Etmopterus spinax
- Oxynotus centrina
- Centroscymnus coelolepis
- Somniosus rostratus
- Squalus acanthias
- Squalus blainvillei
- Squalus megalops
- Squalus uyato
- Squatina aculeata
- Squatina oculata
- Squatina squatina
- Galeus atlanticus
- Galeus melastomus
- Scyliorhinus canicula
- Scyliorhinus stellaris
- Galeorhinus galeus
- Mustelus asterias
- Mustelus mustelus
- Mustelus punctulatus
- Carcharias taurus
- Odontaspis ferox
- Alopias superciliosus
- Alopias vulpinus
- Cetorhinus maximus
- Carcharodon carcharias
- Isurus oxyrinchus
- Lamna nasus
- Carcharhinus altimus
- Carcharhinus amboinensis
- Carcharhinus brachyurus
- Carcharhinus brevipinna
- Carcharhinus falciformis
- Carcharhinus limbatus
- Carcharhinus longimanus
- Carcharhinus melanopterus
- Carcharhinus obscurus
- Carcharhinus plumbeus
- Galeocerdo cuvier
- Prionace glauca
- Rhizoprionodon acutus
- Sphyrna lewini
- Sphyrna mokarran
- Sphyrna tudes
- Sphyrna zygaena

=== Batoidea ===
- Pristis pectinata
- Pristis pristis
- Torpedo marmorata
- Torpedo nobiliana
- Torpedo sinuspersici
- Torpedo torpedo
- Glaucostegus halavi
- Rhinobatos cemiculus
- Rhinobatos rhinobatos
- Dipturus batis
- Dipturus oxyrinchus
- Leucoraja circularis
- Leucoraja fullonica
- Leucoraja melitensis
- Leucoraja naevus
- Raja africana
- Raja asterias
- Raja brachyura
- Raja clavata
- Raja miraletus
- Raja montagui
- Raja polystigma
- Raja radula
- Raja rondeleti
- Raja undulata
- Rostroraja alba
- Bathytoshia lata
- Dasyatis chrysonota
- Dasyatis marmorata
- Dasyatis pastinaca
- Dasyatis tortonesei
- Himantura uarnak
- Pteroplatytrygon violacea
- Taeniura grabata
- Urogymnus asperrimus
- Gymnura altavela
- Mobula mobular
- Myliobatis aquila
- Pteromylaeus bovinus
- Rhinoptera marginata

== Osteichthyes ==
=== Acipenseriformes ===
- Acipenser naccarii
- Acipenser stellatus
- Acipenser sturio
- Huso huso

=== Anguilliformes ===
- Anguilla anguilla
- Ariosoma balearicum
- Conger conger
- Gnathophis mystax
- Rhynchoconger trewavasae
- Chlopsis bicolor
- Panturichthys fowleri
- Anarchias euryurus
- Enchelycore anatina
- Gymnothorax unicolor
- Muraena helena
- Cynoponticus ferox
- Muraenesox cinereus
- Nemichthys scolopaceus
- Facciolella oxyrhyncha
- Nettastoma melanurum
- Saurenchelys cancrivora
- Apterichtus anguiformis
- Apterichtus caecus
- Dalophis imberbis
- Echelus myrus
- Mystriophis crosnieri
- Ophichthus ophis
- Ophichthus rufus
- Ophisurus serpens
- Pisodonophis semicinctus
- Serrivomer brevidentatus
- Dysomma brevirostre

=== Notacanthiformes ===
- Halosaurus ovenii
- Notacanthus bonaparte
- Polyacanthonotus rissoanus

=== Clupeiformes ===
- Alosa agone
- Alosa alosa
- Alosa fallax
- Dussumieria elopsoides
- Etrumeus teres
- Herklotsichthys punctatus
- Sardina pilchardus
- Sardinella aurita
- Sardinella maderensis
- Spratelloides delicatulus
- Sprattus sprattus
- Engraulis encrasicolus

=== Siluriformes ===
- Arius parkii
- Netuma thalassina
- Plotosus lineatus

=== Argentiniformes ===
- Argentina sphyraena
- Alepocephalus rostratus
- Glossanodon leioglossus
- Microstoma microstoma
- Nansenia iberica
- Nansenia oblita

=== Salmoniformes ===
- Salmo salar
- Salmo trutta

=== Stomiiformes ===
- Argyropelecus hemigymnus
- Argyropelecus olfersii
- Maurolicus muelleri
- Cyclothone braueri
- Cyclothone microdon
- Cyclothone pygmaea
- Gonostoma denudatum
- Valenciennellus tripunctulatus
- Bathophilus nigerrimus
- Bathophilus vaillanti
- Borostomias antarcticus
- Chauliodus sloani
- Stomias boa
- Ichthyococcus ovatus
- Vinciguerria attenuata
- Vinciguerria poweriae

=== Aulopiformes ===
- Alepisaurus ferox
- Aulopus filamentosus
- Chlorophthalmus agassizi
- Bathysaurus mollis
- Bathypterois dubius
- Bathypterois grallator
- Evermannella balbo
- Arctozenus rissi
- Lestidiops jayakari
- Lestidiops sphyrenoides
- Lestidium atlanticum
- Paralepis coregonoides
- Paralepis speciosa
- Sudis hyalina
- Saurida undosquamis
- Synodus saurus

=== Myctophiformes ===
- Benthosema glaciale
- Ceratoscopelus maderensis
- Diaphus holti
- Diaphus metopoclampus
- Diaphus rafinesquii
- Diogenichthys atlanticus
- Electrona risso
- Gonichthys cocco
- Hygophum benoiti
- Hygophum hygomii
- Lampanyctus crocodilus
- Lampanyctus pusillus
- Lobianchia dofleini
- Lobianchia gemellarii
- Myctophum punctatum
- Notoscopelus bolini
- Notoscopelus elongatus
- Notoscopelus kroyeri
- Symbolophorus veranyi

=== Lampriformes ===
- Lampris guttatus
- Lophotus lacepede
- Regalecus glesne
- Trachipterus arcticus
- Trachipterus trachypterus
- Zu cristatus

=== Zeiformes ===
- Zeus faber
- Zenopsis conchifer

=== Gadiformes ===
- Coelorinchus caelorhincus
- Coelorinchus occa
- Coryphaenoides guentheri
- Coryphaenoides mediterraneus
- Hymenocephalus italicus
- Nezumia aequalis
- Nezumia sclerorhynchus
- Trachyrincus scabrus
- Merluccius merluccius
- Eretmophorus kleinenbergi
- Gadella maraldi
- Guttigadus latifrons
- Lepidion guentheri
- Lepidion lepidion
- Mora moro
- Physiculus dalwigki
- Rhynchogadus hepaticus
- Phycis blennoides
- Phycis phycis
- Gaidropsarus biscayensis
- Gaidropsarus granti
- Gaidropsarus mediterraneus
- Gaidropsarus vulgaris
- Molva dypterygia
- Molva macrophthalma
- Molva molva
- Gadiculus argenteus
- Merlangius merlangus
- Micromesistius poutassou
- Trisopterus luscus
- Trisopterus minutus

=== Beryciformes ===
- Beryx decadactylus
- Beryx splendens
- Sargocentron praslin
- Sargocentron rubrum
- Aulotrachichthys sajademalensis
- Gephyroberyx darwinii
- Hoplostethus mediterraneus

=== Ophidiiformes ===
- Bellottia apoda
- Cataetyx alleni
- Cataetyx laticeps
- Grammonus ater
- Carapus acus
- Echiodon dentatus
- Echiodon drummondii
- Benthocometes robustus
- Ophidion barbatum
- Ophidion rochei
- Parophidion vassali

=== Mugilidae ===
- Chelon labrosus
- Liza aurata
- Liza carinata
- Liza haematocheila
- Liza ramada
- Liza saliens
- Mugil cephalus
- Oedalechilus labeo
- Jamie minimus

=== Atherinomorpha ===
- Atherina boyeri
- Atherina hepsetus
- Atherina presbyter
- Atherinomorus lacunosus
- Belone belone
- Belone svetovidovi
- Tylosurus acus
- Tylosurus choram
- Scomberesox saurus saurus
- Cheilopogon exsiliens
- Cheilopogon furcatus
- Cheilopogon heterurus
- Exocoetus obtusirostris
- Exocoetus volitans
- Hirundichthys rondeletii
- Hirundichthys speculiger
- Parexocoetus mento
- Hemiramphus far
- Hyporhamphus affinis
- Hyporhamphus picarti
- Aphanius dispar dispar
- Aphanius fasciatus
- Aphanius iberus

=== Syngnathoidei ===
- Fistularia commersonii
- Fistularia petimba
- Macroramphosus scolopax
- Entelurus aequoreus
- Hippocampus fuscus
- Hippocampus guttulatus
- Hippocampus hippocampus
- Minyichthys sentus
- Nerophis lumbriciformis
- Nerophis maculatus
- Nerophis ophidion
- Syngnathus abaster
- Syngnathus acus
- Syngnathus phlegon
- Syngnathus rostellatus
- Syngnathus taenionotus
- Syngnathus tenuirostris
- Syngnathus typhle

=== Serranidae ===
- Anthias anthias
- Cephalopholis taeniops
- Epinephelus aeneus
- Epinephelus caninus
- Epinephelus coioides
- Epinephelus costae
- Epinephelus malabaricus
- Epinephelus marginatus
- Hyporthodus haifensis
- Mycteroperca rubra
- Serranus atricauda
- Serranus cabrilla
- Serranus hepatus
- Serranus scriba

=== Scorpaenoidei ===
- Helicolenus dactylopterus
- Trachyscorpia cristulata
- Pontinus kuhlii
- Pterois miles
- Scorpaena azorica
- Scorpaena elongata
- Scorpaena loppei
- Scorpaena maderensis
- Scorpaena notata
- Scorpaena porcus
- Scorpaena scrofa
- Scorpaena stephanica
- Scorpaenodes arenai
- Sebastapistes mauritiana
- Elates ransonnetti
- Papilloculiceps longiceps
- Platycephalus indicus
- Sorsogona prionota
- Chelidonichthys cuculus
- Chelidonichthys lucerna
- Chelidonichthys obscurus
- Eutrigla gurnardus
- Lepidotrigla cavillone
- Lepidotrigla dieuzeidei
- Trigla lyra
- Trigloporus lastoviza
- Peristedion cataphractum

=== Cottoidei ===
- Taurulus bubalis
- Eutelichthys leptochirus
- Paraliparis murieli
- Melanostigma atlanticum
- Cyclopterus lumpus

=== Miscellaneous "Percoidei" ===
- Apogonidae
  - Apogon imberbis
  - Apogon queketti
  - Apogon smithi
  - Apogonichthyoides nigripinnis
  - Apogonichthyoides pharaonis
  - Apogonichthyoides taeniatus
- Brama brama
- Callanthias ruber
- Cepola macrophthalma
- Chaetodontidae
  - Chaetodon hoefleri
  - Chaetodon melannotus
  - Heniochus intermedius
- Ephippidae
  - Platax teira
- Epigonidae
  - Epigonus constanciae
  - Epigonus denticulatus
  - Epigonus telescopus
  - Microichthys coccoi
  - Microichthys sanzoi
- Haemulidae
  - Parapristipoma humile
  - Parapristipoma octolineatum
  - Plectorhinchus mediterraneus
  - Pomadasys incisus
  - Pomadasys stridens
- Kyphosus saltatrix
- Leiognathidae
  - Equulites klunzingeri
- Lobotes surinamensis
- Lutjanidae
  - Lutjanus argentimaculatus
  - Lutjanus jocu
- Moronidae
  - Dicentrarchus labrax
  - Dicentrarchus punctatus
- Mullidae
  - Mullus barbatus
  - Mullus surmuletus
  - Parupeneus forsskali
  - Pseudupeneus prayensis
  - Upeneus moluccensis
  - Upeneus pori
- Pempheris vanicolensis
- Polyprion americanus
- Pomatomus saltatrix
- Polynemidae
  - Galeoides decadactylus
- Pomacentridae
  - Abudefduf vaigiensis
  - Chromis chromis
  - Chromis viridis
- Priacanthidae
  - Priacanthus arenatus
  - Argyrosomus regius
- Sillago sihama
- Sciaenidae
  - Sciaena umbra
  - Umbrina canariensis
  - Umbrina cirrosa
  - Umbrina ronchus
- Synagrops japonicus
- Teraponidae
  - Pelates quadrilineatus
  - Terapon puta
  - Terapon theraps

=== Sparidae ===
- Boops boops
- Centracanthus cirrus
- Crenidens crenidens
- Dentex dentex
- Dentex gibbosus
- Dentex macrophthalmus
- Dentex maroccanus
- Diplodus annularis
- Diplodus bellottii
- Diplodus cervinus
- Diplodus puntazzo
- Diplodus sargus
- Diplodus vulgaris
- Lithognathus mormyrus
- Nemipterus japonicus
- Nemipterus randalli
- Oblada melanura
- Pagellus acarne
- Pagellus bellottii
- Pagellus bogaraveo
- Pagellus erythrinus
- Pagrus auriga
- Pagrus caeruleostictus
- Pagrus major
- Pagrus pagrus
- Rhabdosargus haffara
- Sarpa salpa
- Sparus aurata
- Spicara maena
- Spicara smaris
- Spondyliosoma cantharus

=== Gobiidae ===
- Aphia minuta
- Bathygobius soporator
- Buenia affinis
- Buenia jeffreysii
- Chromogobius quadrivittatus
- Chromogobius zebratus
- Corcyrogobius liechtensteini
- Coryogalops ocheticus
- Crystallogobius linearis
- Deltentosteus collonianus
- Deltentosteus quadrimaculatus
- Didogobius bentuvii
- Didogobius schlieweni
- Didogobius splechtnai
- Favonigobius melanobranchus
- Gammogobius steinitzi
- Gobius ater
- Gobius auratus
- Gobius bucchichi
- Gobius cobitis
- Gobius couchi
- Gobius cruentatus
- Gobius fallax
- Gobius geniporus
- Gobius kolombatovici
- Gobius niger
- Gobius paganellus
- Gobius roulei
- Gobius strictus
- Gobius vittatus
- Gobius xanthocephalus
- Gobiusculus flavescens
- Knipowitschia caucasica
- Knipowitschia panizzae
- Lebetus guilleti
- Lesueurigobius friesii
- Lesueurigobius sanzi
- Lesueurigobius suerii
- Millerigobius macrocephalus
- Neogobius melanostomus
- Odondebuenia balearica
- Oxyurichthys papuensis
- Oxyurichthys petersi
- Pomatoschistus bathi
- Pomatoschistus canestrinii
- Pomatoschistus knerii
- Pomatoschistus marmoratus
- Pomatoschistus microps
- Pomatoschistus minutus
- Pomatoschistus norvegicus
- Pomatoschistus pictus
- Pomatoschistus quagga
- Pomatoschistus tortonesei
- Pseudaphya ferreri
- Silhouettea aegyptia
- Speleogobius trigloides
- Thorogobius ephippiatus
- Thorogobius macrolepis
- Vanneaugobius dollfusi
- Vanneaugobius pruvoti
- Zebrus zebrus
- Zosterisessor ophiocephalus

=== Blennioidei ===
- Aidablennius sphynx
- Blennius ocellaris
- Clinitrachus argentatus
- Coryphoblennius galerita
- Hypleurochilus bananensis
- Lipophrys adriaticus
- Lipophrys canevae
- Lipophrys dalmatinus
- Lipophrys nigriceps
- Lipophrys pholis
- Omobranchus punctatus
- Parablennius gattorugine
- Parablennius incognitus
- Parablennius pilicornis
- Parablennius rouxi
- Parablennius sanguinolentus
- Parablennius tentacularis
- Parablennius zvonimiri
- Paralipophrys trigloides
- Petroscirtes ancylodon
- Salaria basilisca
- Salaria pavo
- Scartella cristata
- Tripterygion delaisi
- Tripterygion melanurum
- Tripterygion tripteronotum

=== Callionymidae ===
- Callionymus fasciatus
- Callionymus filamentosus
- Callionymus lyra
- Callionymus maculatus
- Callionymus pusillus
- Callionymus reticulatus
- Callionymus risso
- Synchiropus phaeton

=== Gobiesocidae ===
- Apletodon dentatus
- Apletodon incognitus
- Apletodon microcephalus
- Diplecogaster bimaculata
- Gouania willdenowi
- Lepadogaster candolii
- Lepadogaster lepadogaster
- Lepadogaster purpurea
- Opeatogenys gracilis

=== Labridae ===
- Acantholabrus palloni
- Centrolabrus exoletus
- Centrolabrus trutta
- Coris julis
- Ctenolabrus rupestris
- Iniistius pavo
- Labrus bergylta
- Labrus merula
- Labrus mixtus
- Labrus viridis
- Lappanella fasciata
- Pteragogus pelycus
- Symphodus bailloni
- Symphodus cinereus
- Symphodus doderleini
- Symphodus mediterraneus
- Symphodus melanocercus
- Symphodus melops
- Symphodus ocellatus
- Symphodus roissali
- Symphodus rostratus
- Symphodus tinca
- Thalassoma pavo
- Xyrichtys novacula
- Scarus ghobban
- Sparisoma cretense

=== Carangoidei ===
- Echeneis naucrates
- Remora australis
- Remora brachyptera
- Remora osteochir
- Remora remora
- Coryphaena equiselis
- Coryphaena hippurus
- Alectis alexandrinus
- Alepes djedaba
- Campogramma glaycos
- Caranx crysos
- Caranx hippos
- Caranx rhonchus
- Decapterus macarellus
- Decapterus punctatus
- Decapterus russelli
- Elagatis bipinnulata
- Lichia amia
- Naucrates ductor
- Pseudocaranx dentex
- Rachycentron canadum
- Selene dorsalis
- Seriola carpenteri
- Seriola dumerili
- Seriola fasciata
- Seriola rivoliana
- Trachinotus ovatus
- Trachurus mediterraneus
- Trachurus picturatus
- Trachurus trachurus

=== Stromateoidei ===
- Centrolophus niger
- Hyperoglyphe perciformis
- Schedophilus medusophagus
- Schedophilus ovalis
- Cubiceps capensis
- Cubiceps gracilis
- Psenes pellucidus
- Pampus argenteus
- Stromateus fiatola

=== Sphyraenidae ===
- Sphyraena chrysotaenia
- Sphyraena flavicauda
- Sphyraena obtusata
- Sphyraena sphyraena
- Sphyraena viridensis

=== Xiphioidei ===
- Istiophorus platypterus
- Makaira indica
- Makaira nigricans
- Tetrapturus albidus
- Tetrapturus belone
- Tetrapturus georgii
- Xiphias gladius

=== Scombroidei ===
- Ruvettus pretiosus
- Lepidopus caudatus
- Trichiurus lepturus
- Acanthocybium solandri
- Auxis rochei rochei
- Auxis thazard
- Euthynnus alletteratus
- Katsuwonus pelamis
- Orcynopsis unicolor
- Rastrelliger kanagurta
- Sarda sarda
- Scomber colias
- Scomber scombrus
- Scomberomorus commerson
- Scomberomorus tritor
- Thunnus alalunga
- Thunnus thynnus

=== "Trachinoidei" ===
- Ammodytes tobianus
- Champsodon nudivittis
- Champsodon vorax
- Gymnammodytes cicerelus
- Gymnammodytes semisquamatus
- Pinguipes brasilianus
- Uranoscopus scaber
- Echiichthys vipera
- Trachinus aranaeus
- Trachinus draco
- Trachinus radiatus

=== Pleuronectiformes ===
- Arnoglossus grohmanni
- Arnoglossus imperialis
- Arnoglossus kessleri
- Arnoglossus laterna
- Arnoglossus rueppelii
- Arnoglossus thori
- Bothus podas
- Citharus linguatula
- Platichthys flesus
- Pleuronectes platessa
- Lepidorhombus boscii
- Lepidorhombus whiffiagonis
- Psetta maxima
- Scophthalmus rhombus
- Zeugopterus punctatus
- Zeugopterus regius
- Bathysolea profundicola
- Buglossidium luteum
- Dicologlossa cuneata
- Dicologlossa hexophthalma
- Microchirus azevia
- Microchirus boscanion
- Microchirus ocellatus
- Microchirus variegatus
- Monochirus hispidus
- Pegusa impar
- Pegusa lascaris
- Solea aegyptiaca
- Solea senegalensis
- Solea solea
- Synaptura lusitanica
- Synapturichthys kleinii
- Cynoglossus sinusarabici
- Symphurus ligulatus
- Symphurus nigrescens

=== Acanthuroidei ===
- Acanthurus monroviae
- Luvarus imperialis
- Siganus luridus
- Siganus rivulatus

=== Lophiiformes ===
- Lophius budegassa
- Lophius piscatorius
- Chaunax suttkusi

=== Tetraodontiformes ===
- Balistes capriscus
- Cyclichthys spilostylus
- Diodon hystrix
- Mola mola
- Ranzania laevis
- Stephanolepis diaspros
- Acanthostracion notacanthus
- Acanthostracion quadricornis
- Lactophrys trigonus
- Tetrosomus gibbosus
- Tetragonurus cuvieri
- Arothron hispidus
- Ephippion guttifer
- Lagocephalus lagocephalus
- Lagocephalus sceleratus
- Lagocephalus spadiceus
- Lagocephalus suezensis
- Sphoeroides marmoratus
- Sphoeroides pachygaster
- Torquigener flavimaculosus
- Tylerius spinosissimus

=== Other ===
- Halobatrachus didactylus
- Gasterosteus aculeatus
- Dactylopterus volitans
- Capros aper

== Gallery ==
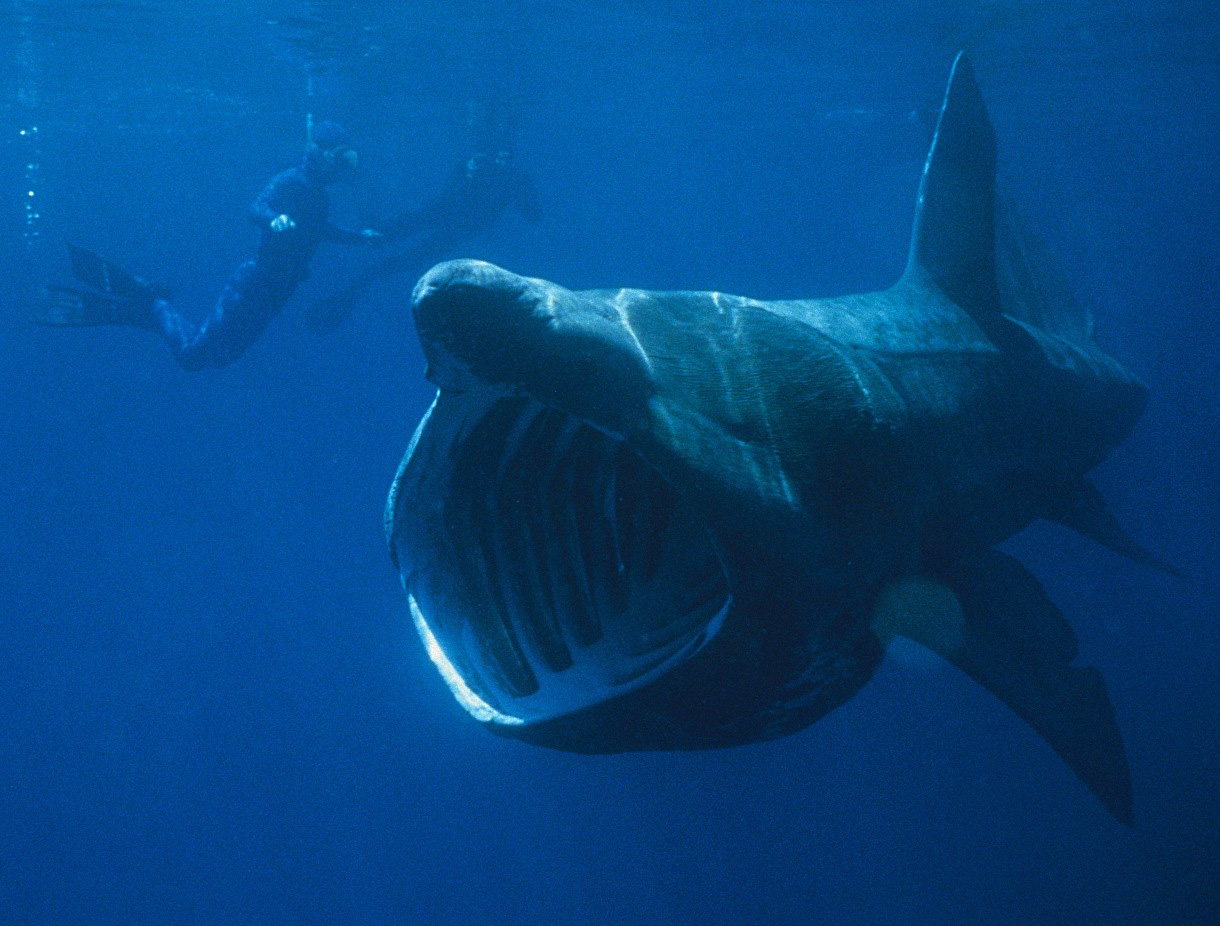
Cetorhinus maximus

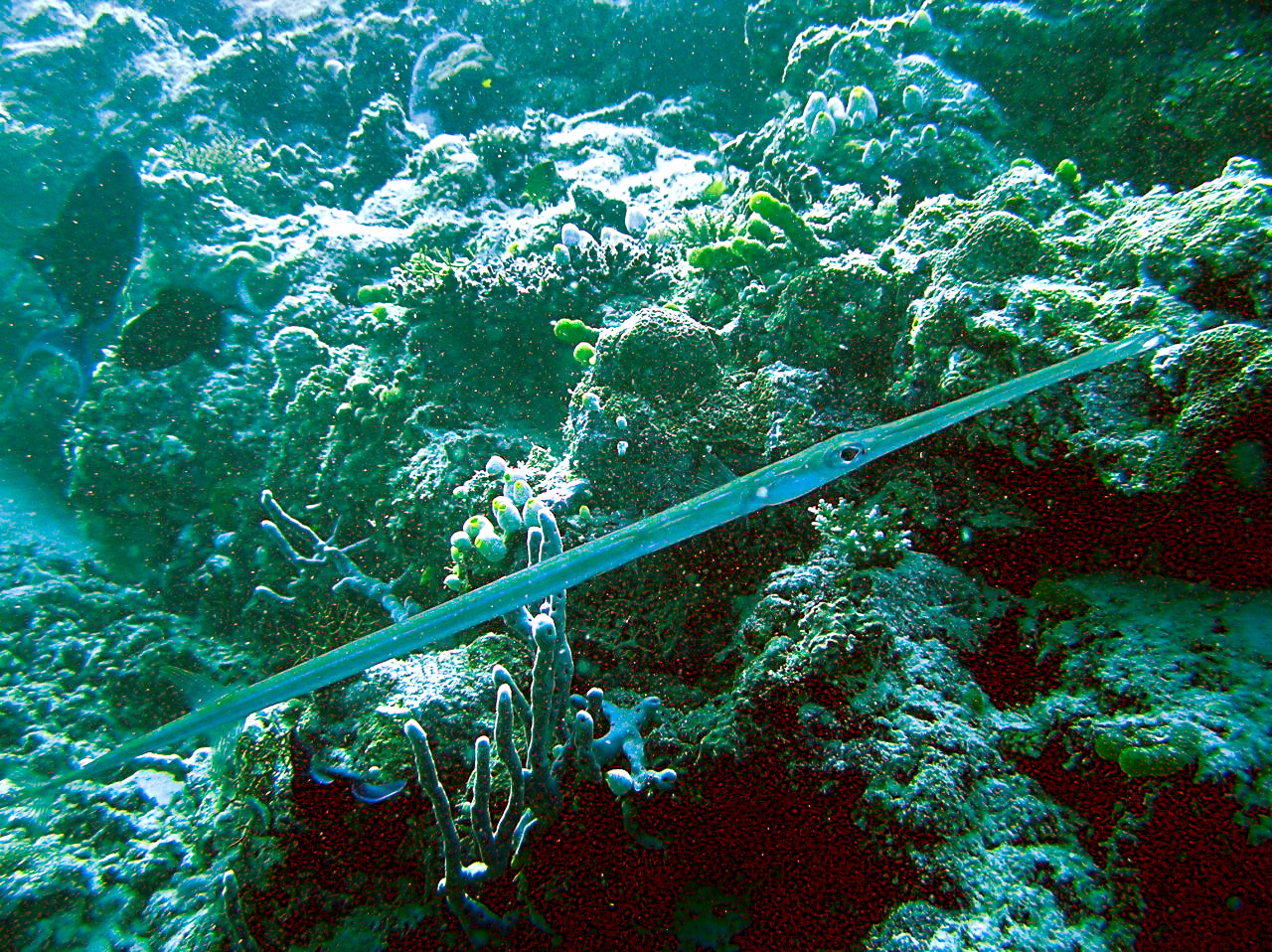
Fistularia commersonii

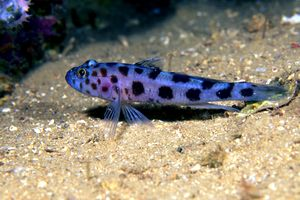
Thorogobius ephippiatus

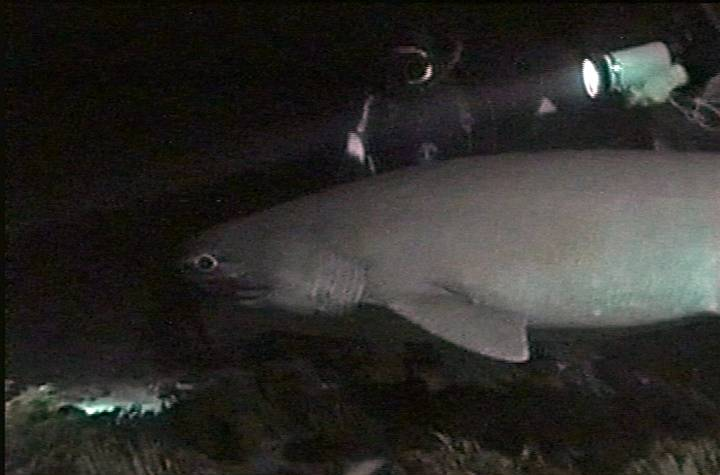
Hexanchus griseus

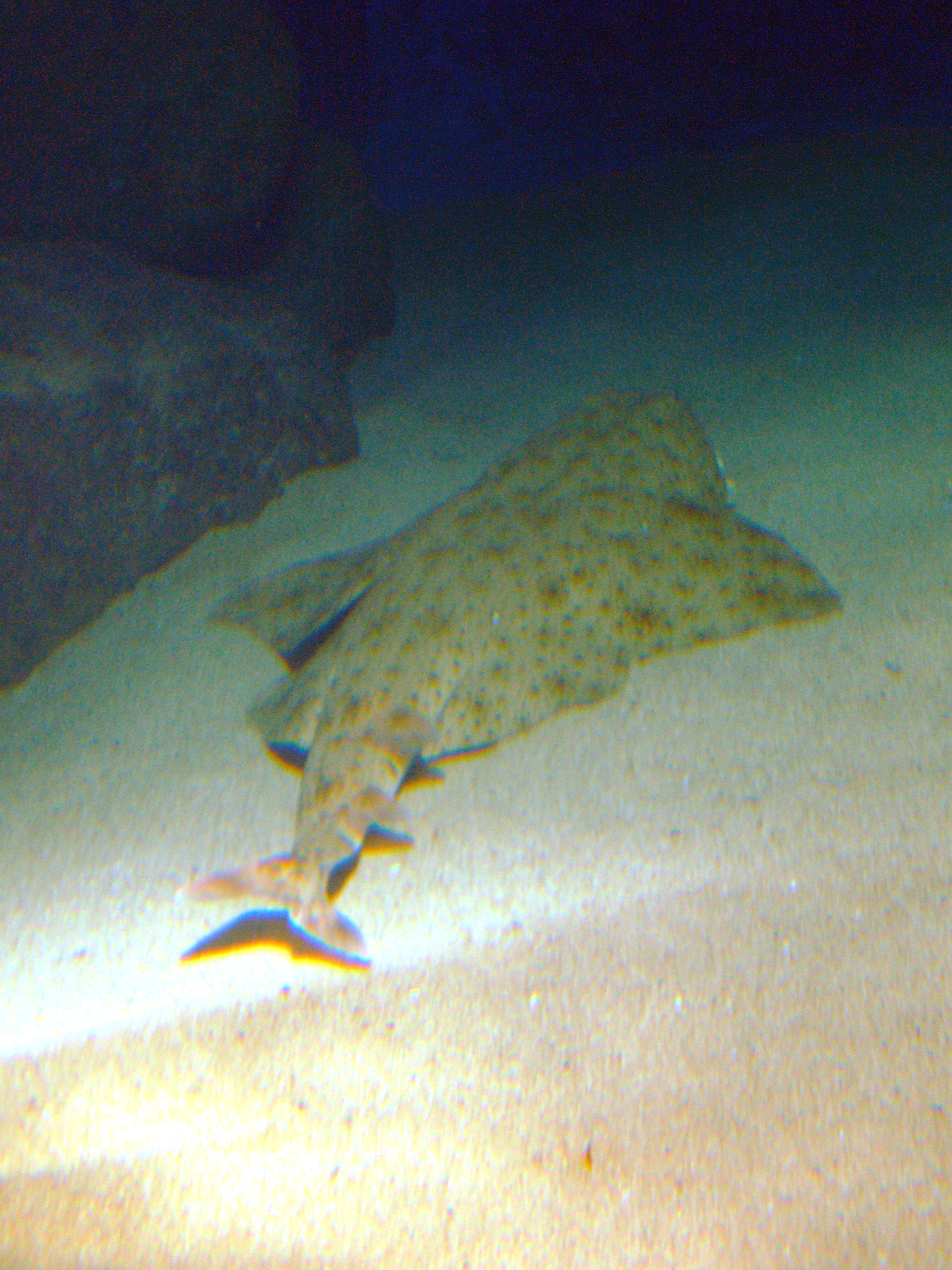
Squatina squatina

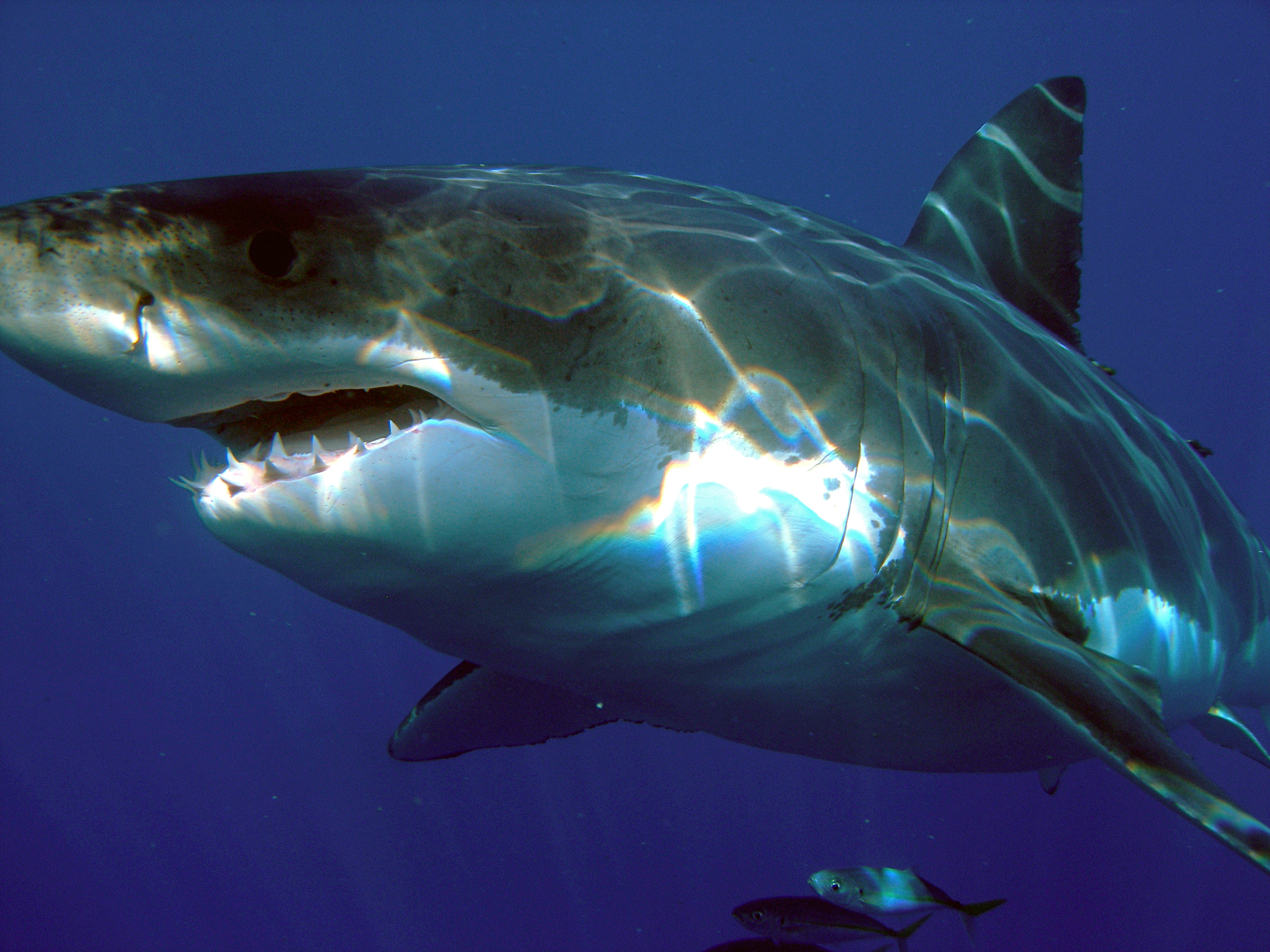
Carcharodon carcharias

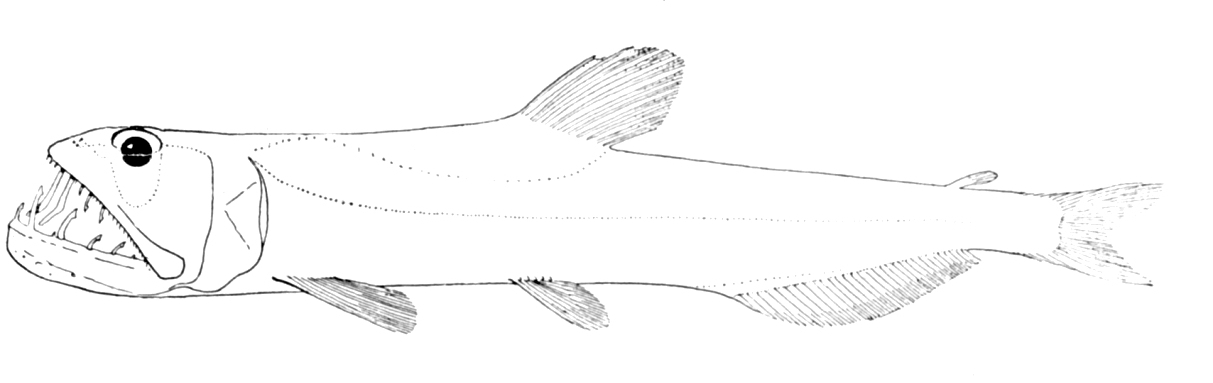
Evermannella balbo

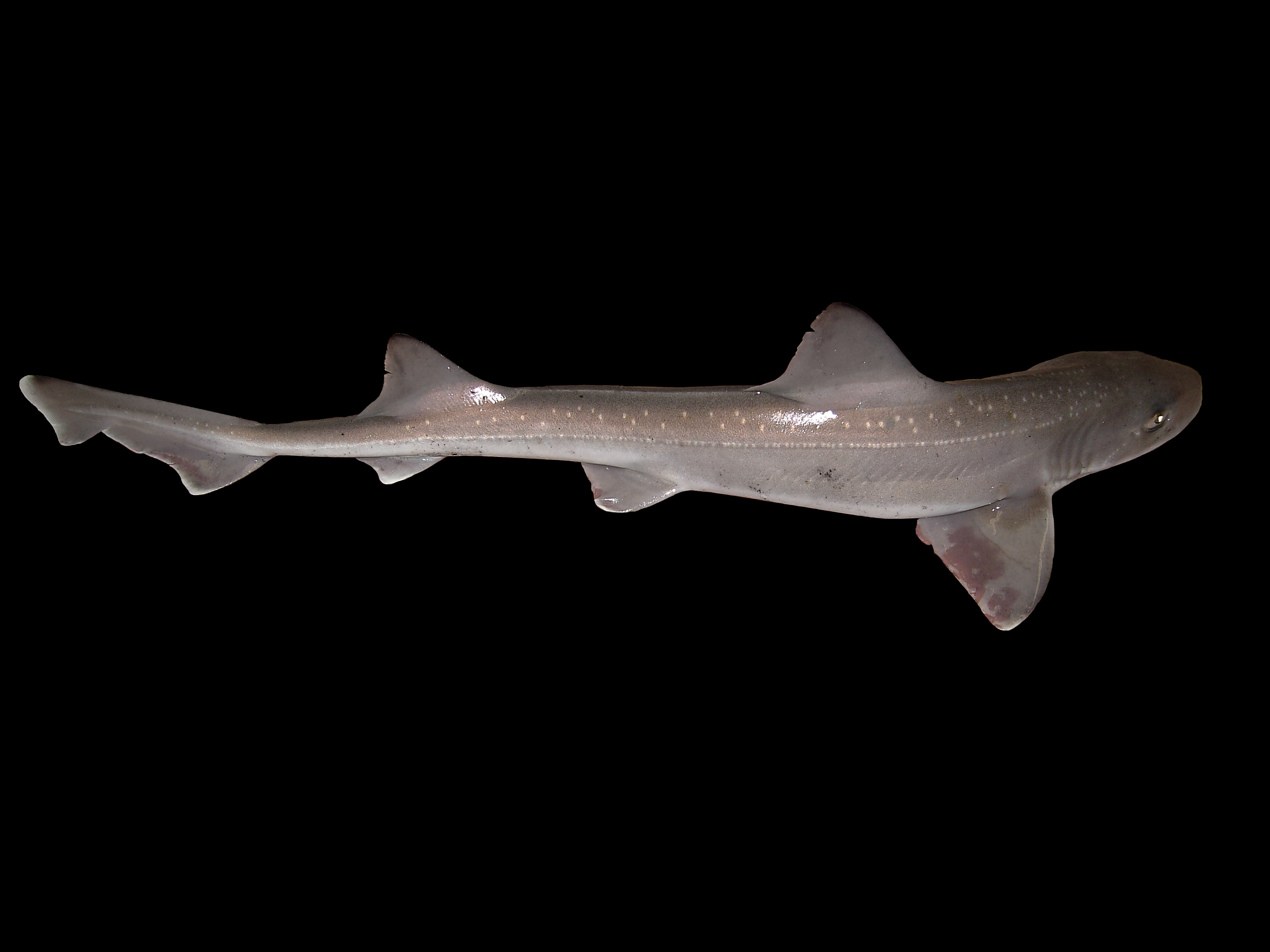
Mustelus mustelus

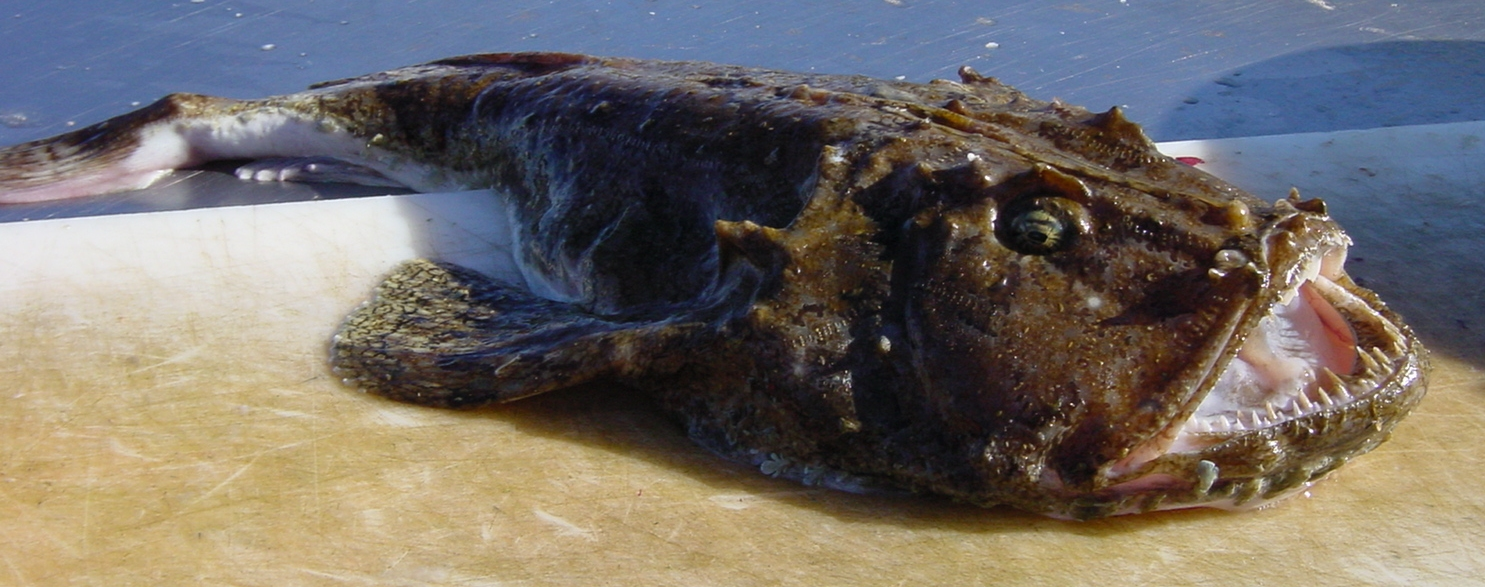
Lophius piscatorius

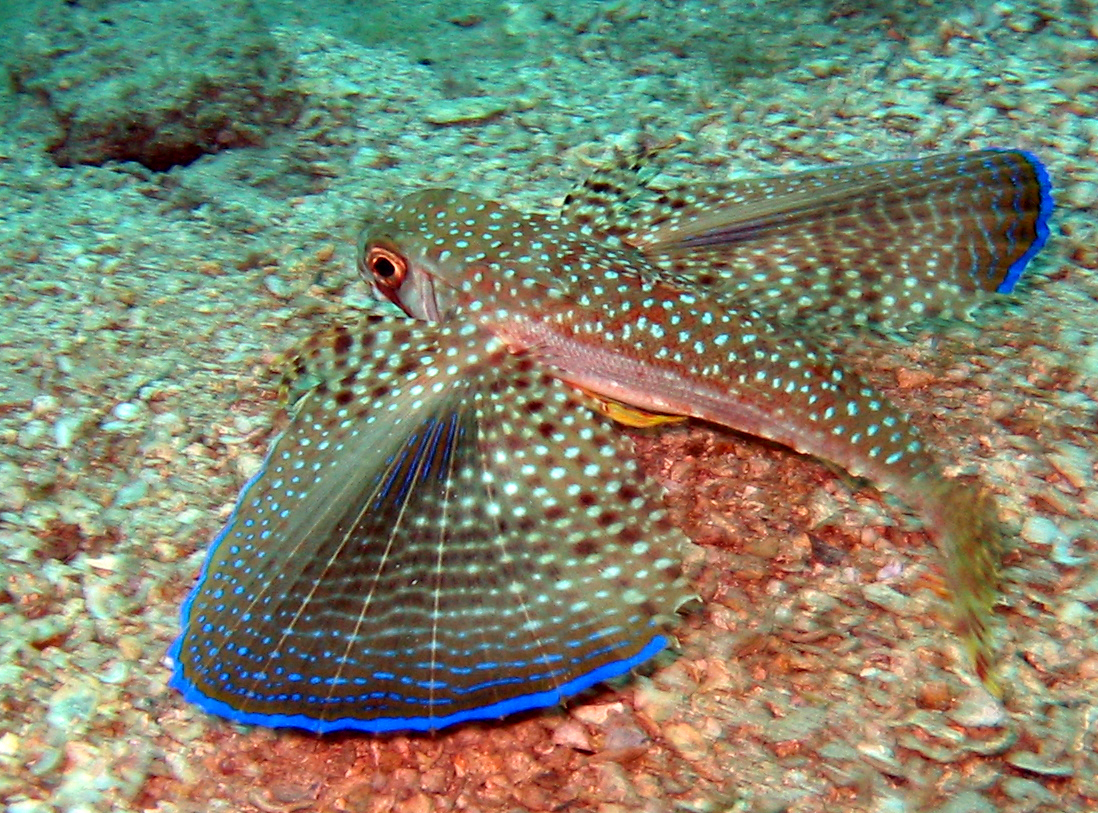
Dactylopterus volitans

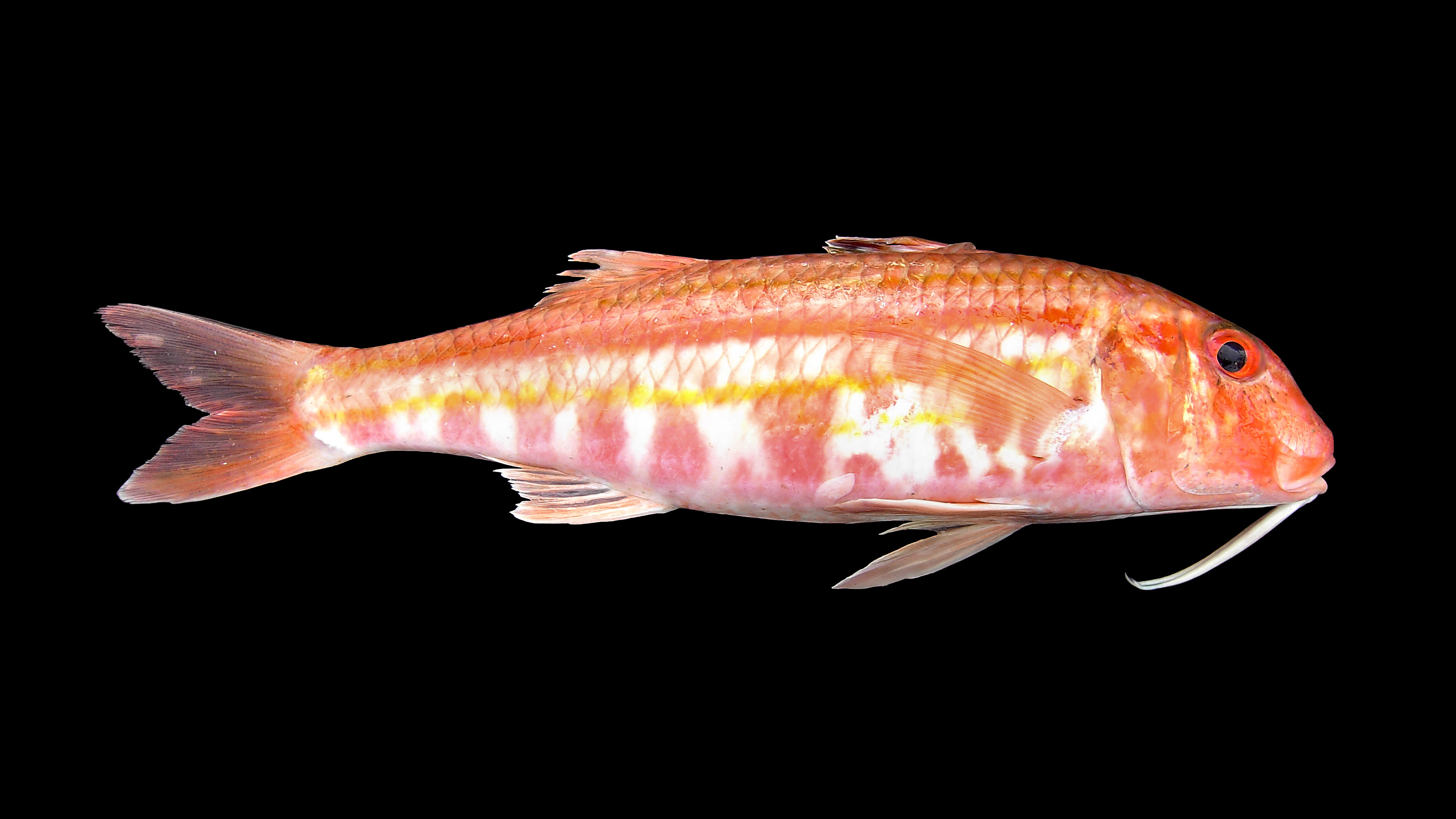
Mullus barbatus

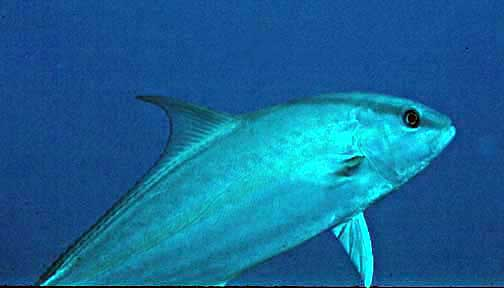
Seriola dumerili

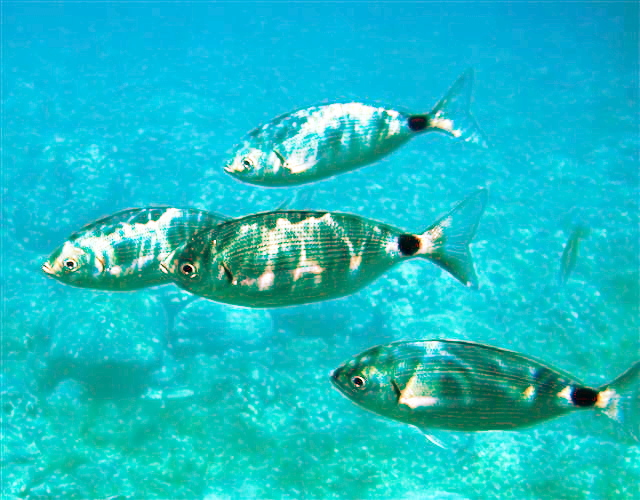
Oblada melanura

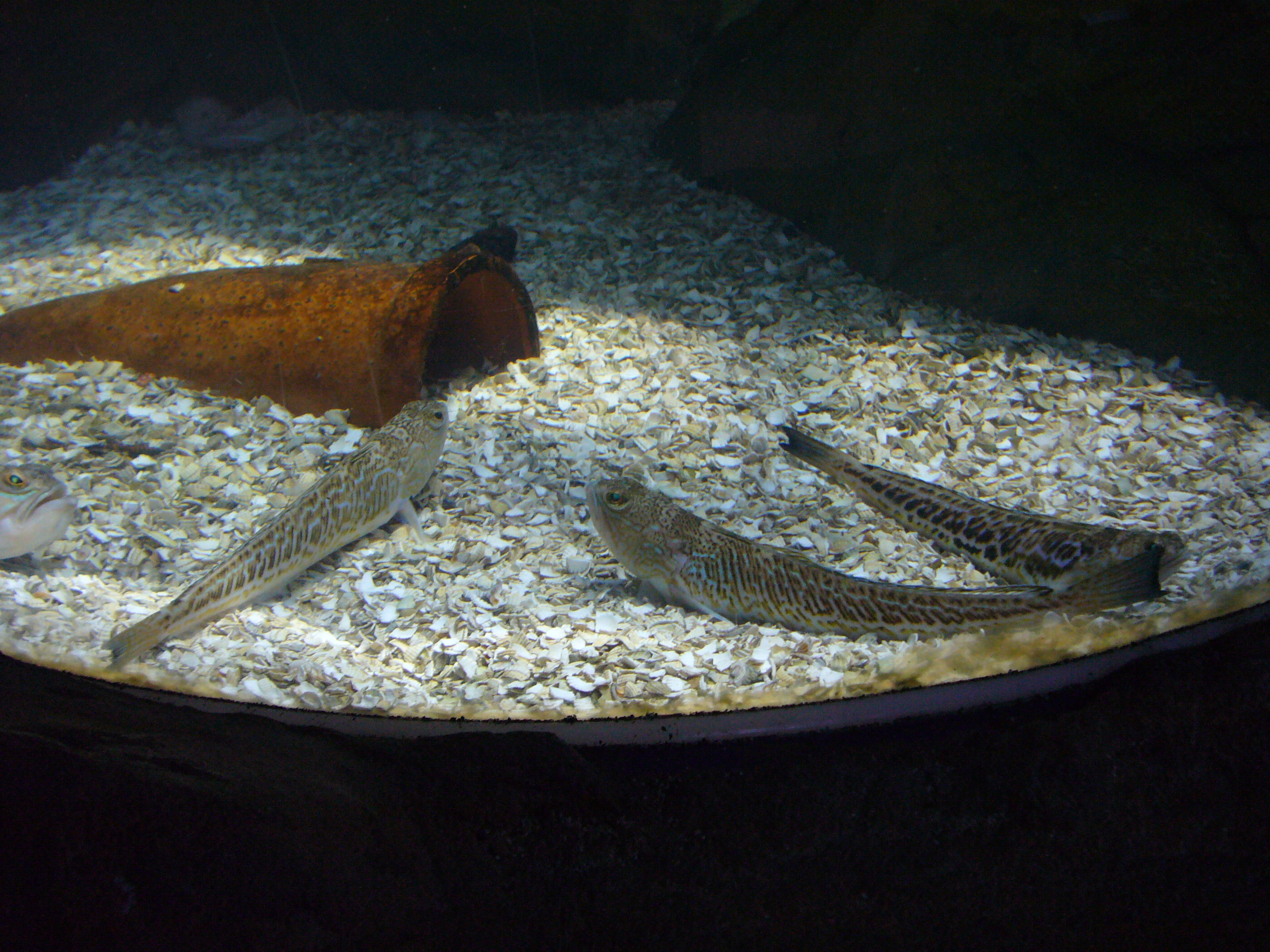
Trachinus draco

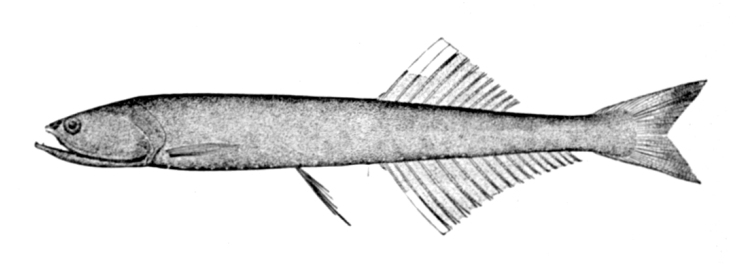
Cyclothone microdon

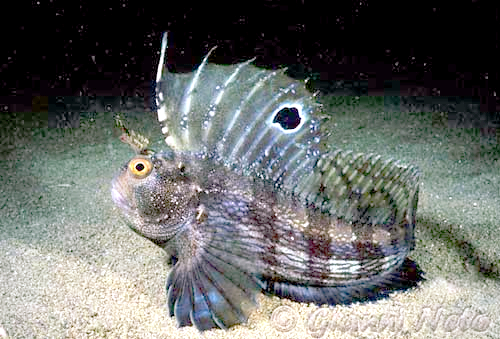
Blennius ocellaris

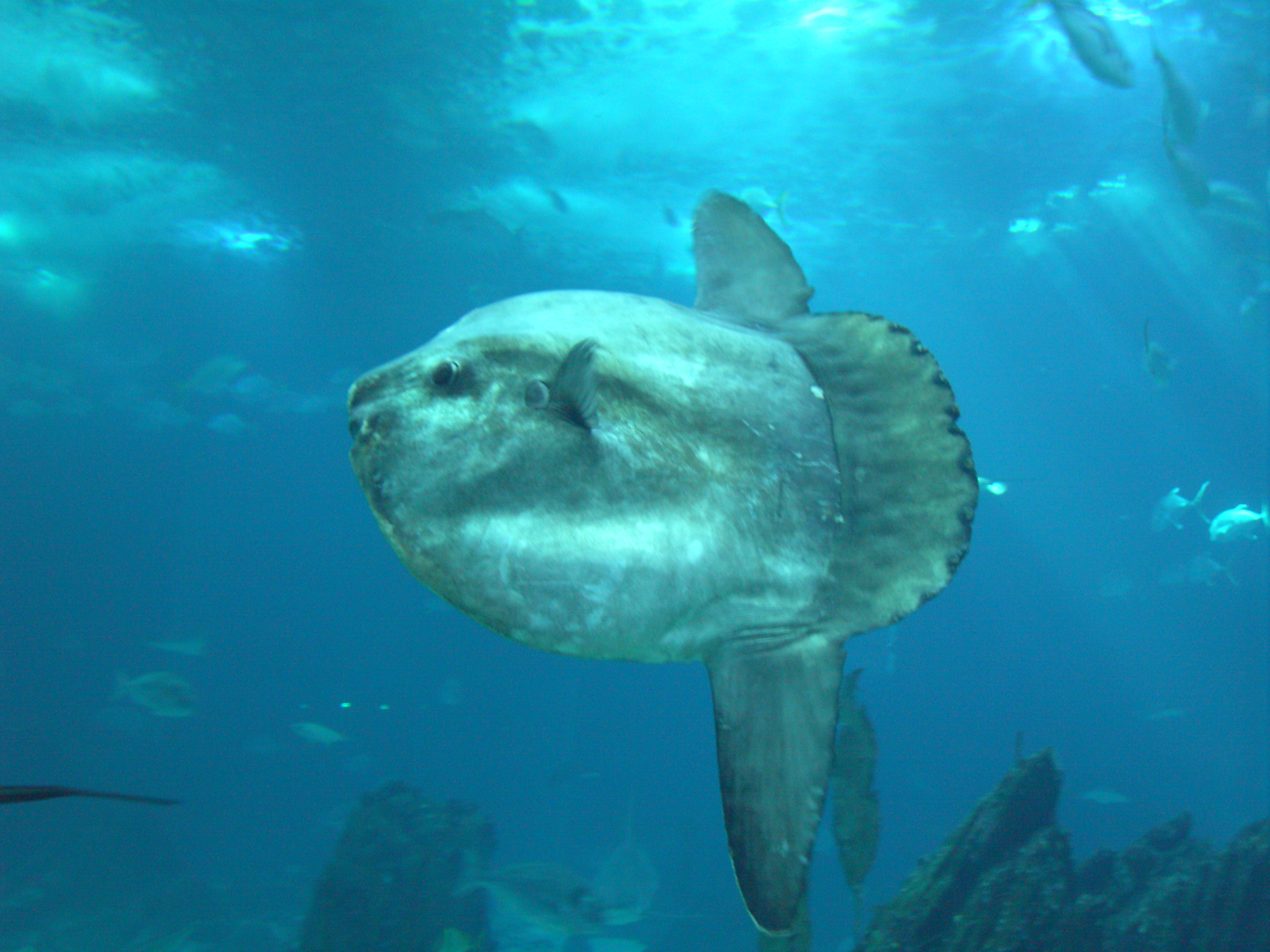
Mola mola

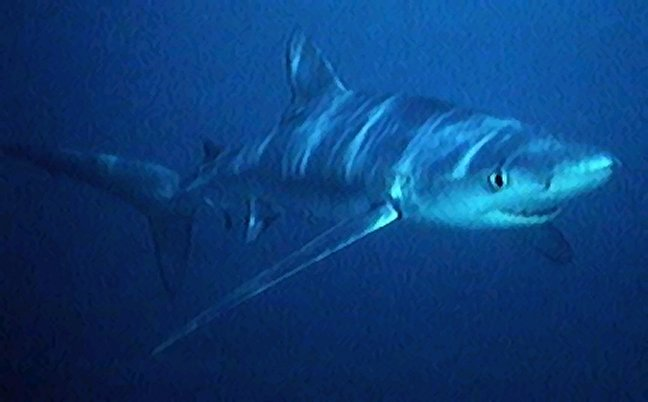
Prionace glauca

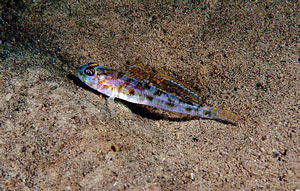
Lesueurigobius friesii

Knipowitschia caucasica

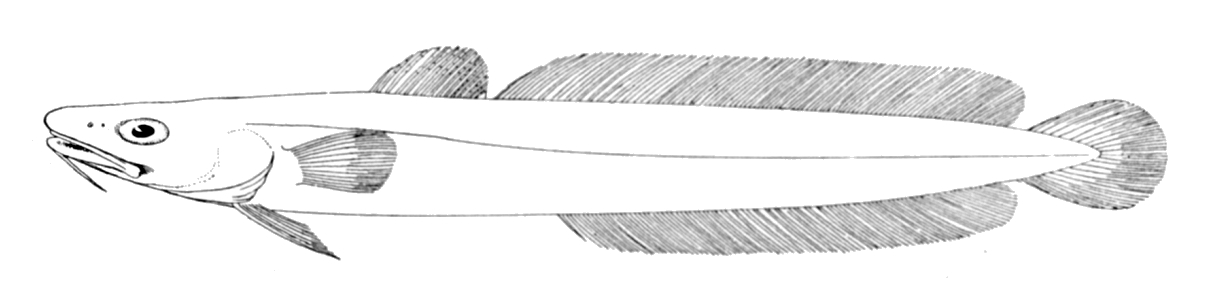
Molva molva

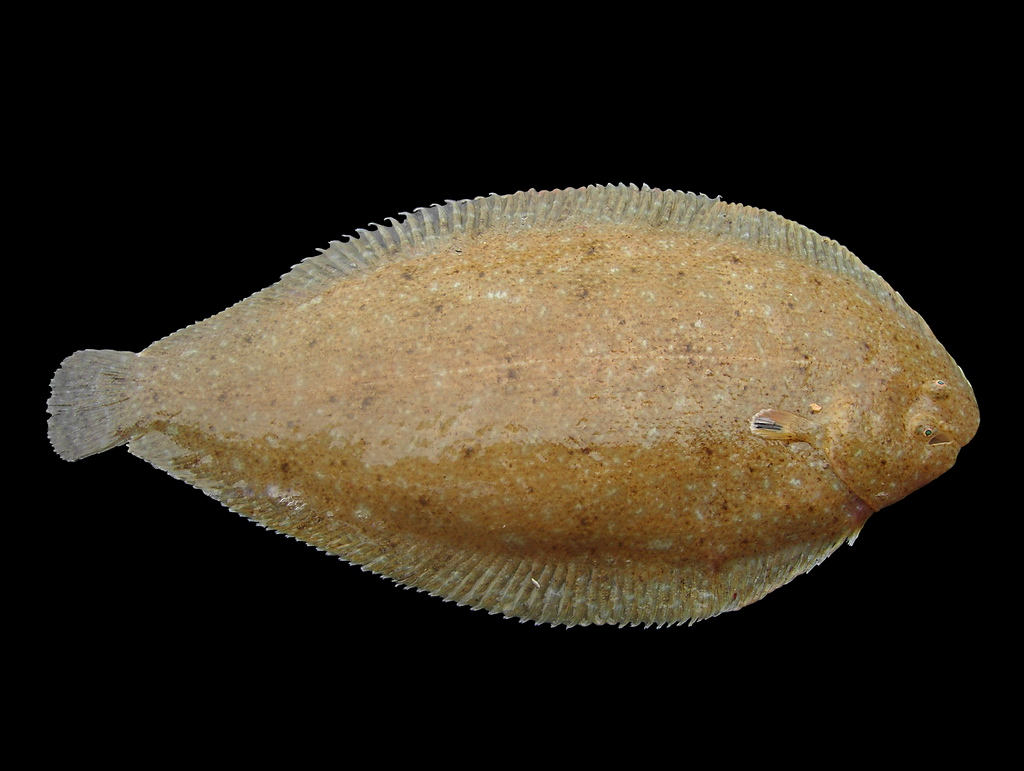
Pegusa lascaris

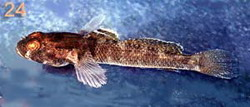
Zebrus zebrus

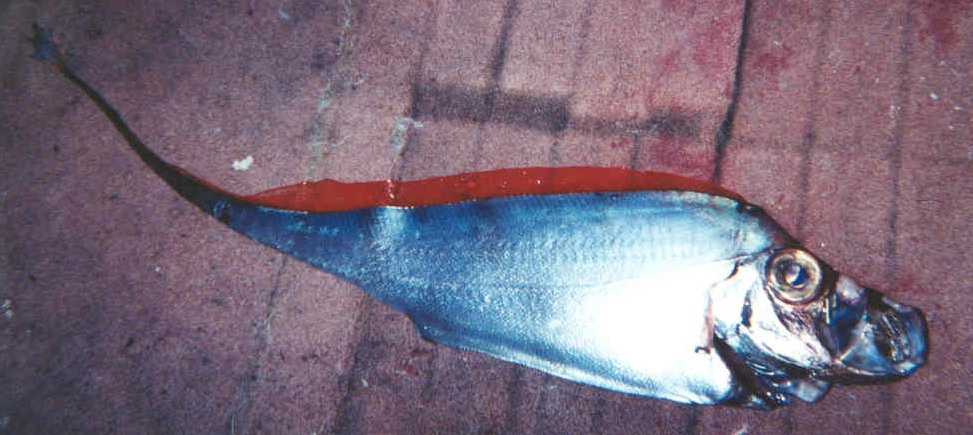
Zu cristatus

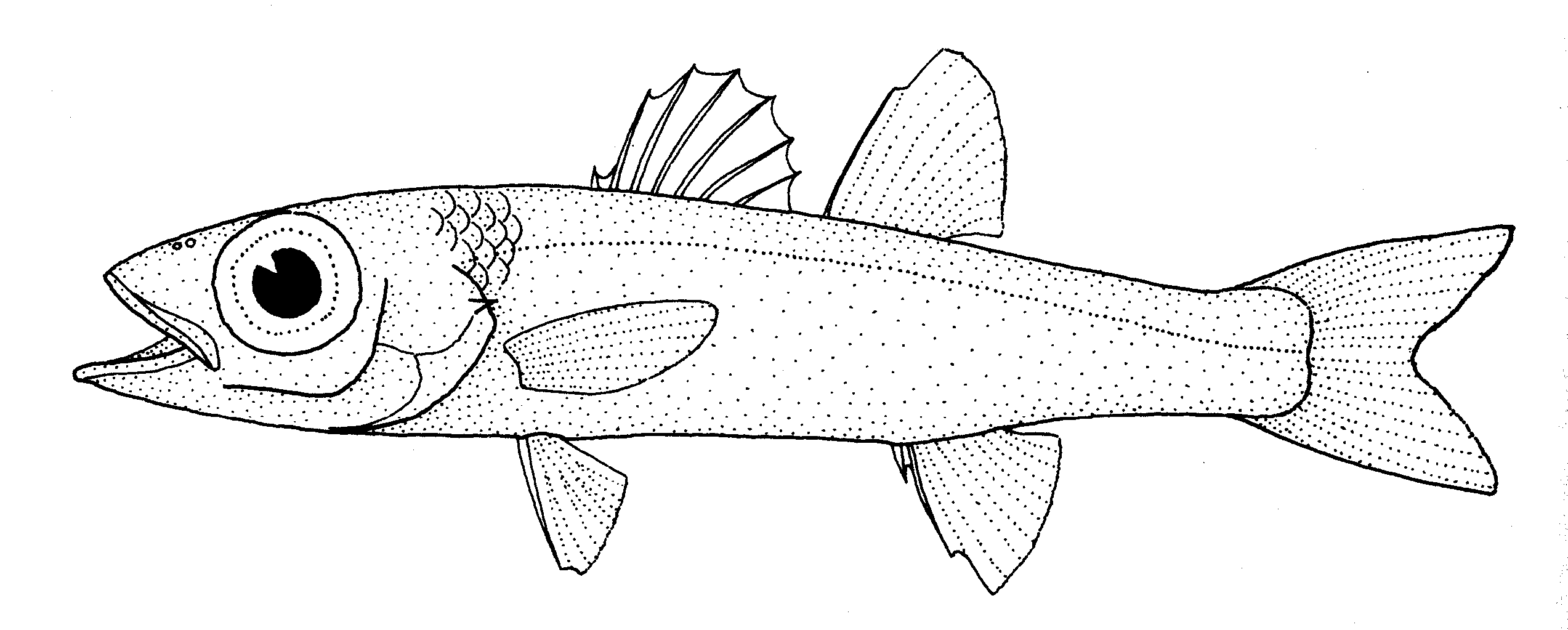
Epigonus telescopus

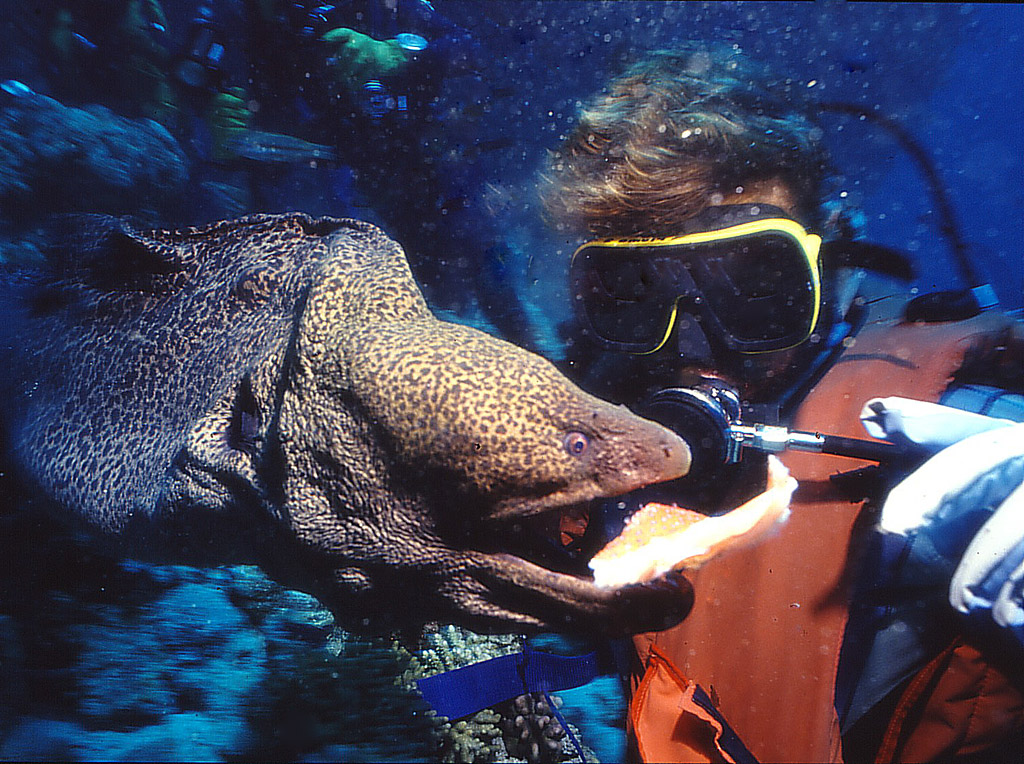
Muraena helena

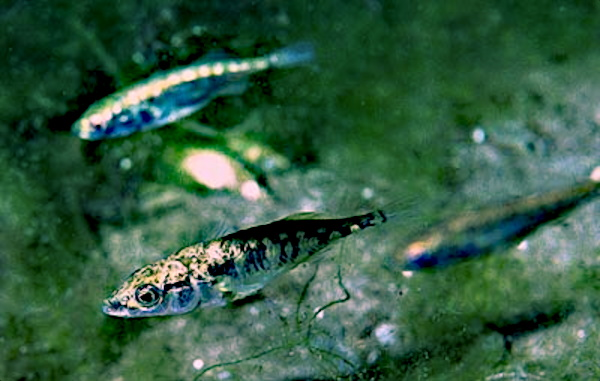
Gasterosteus aculeatus

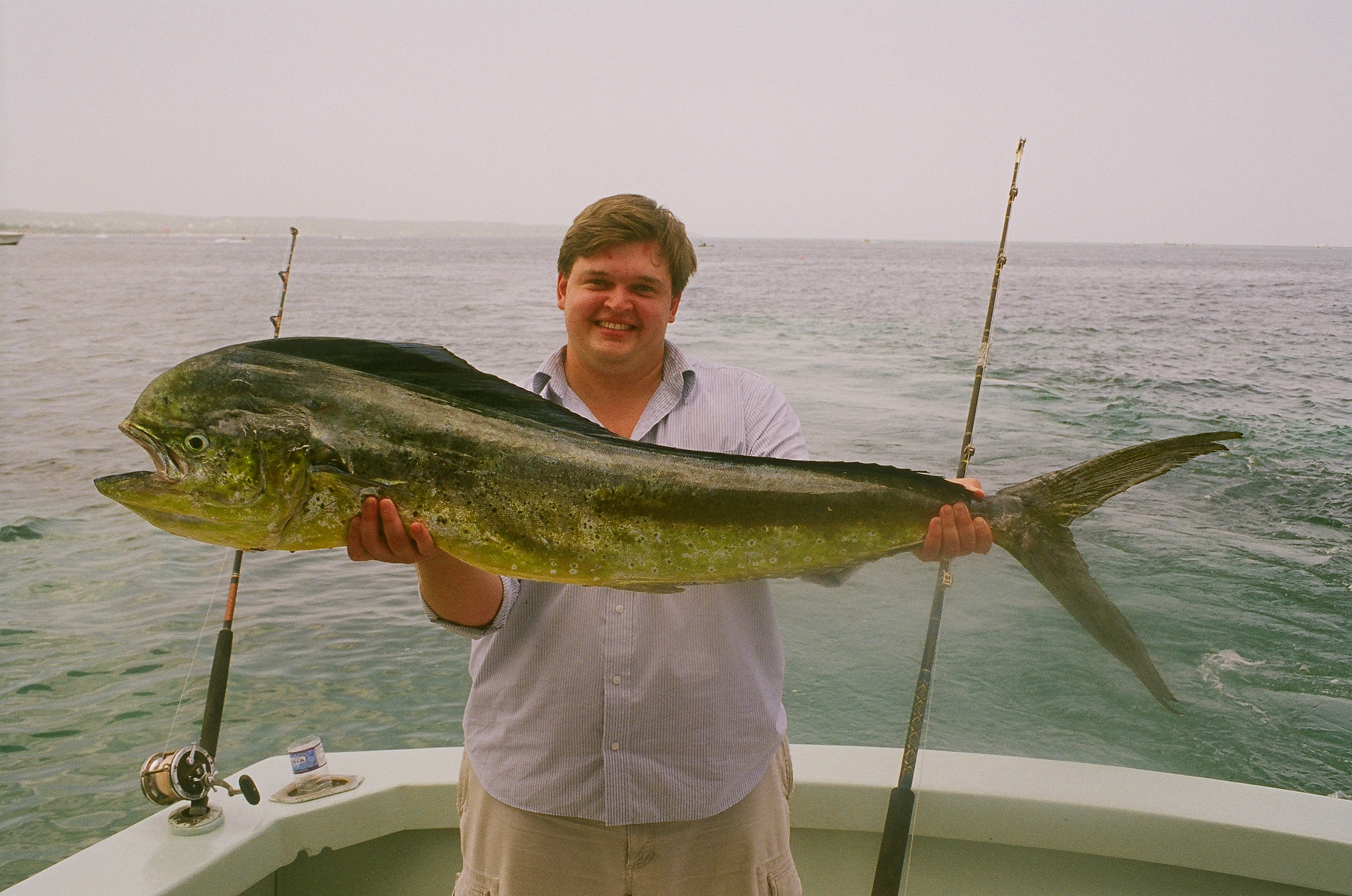
Coryphaena hippurus

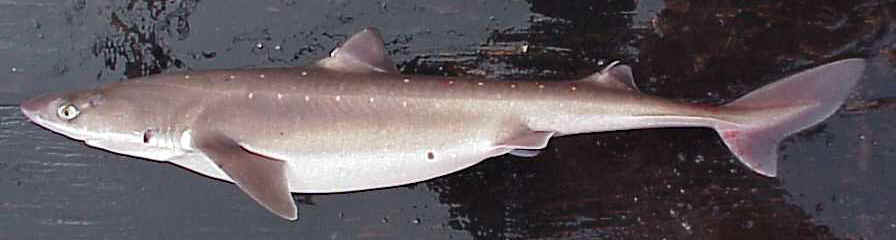
Squalus acanthias

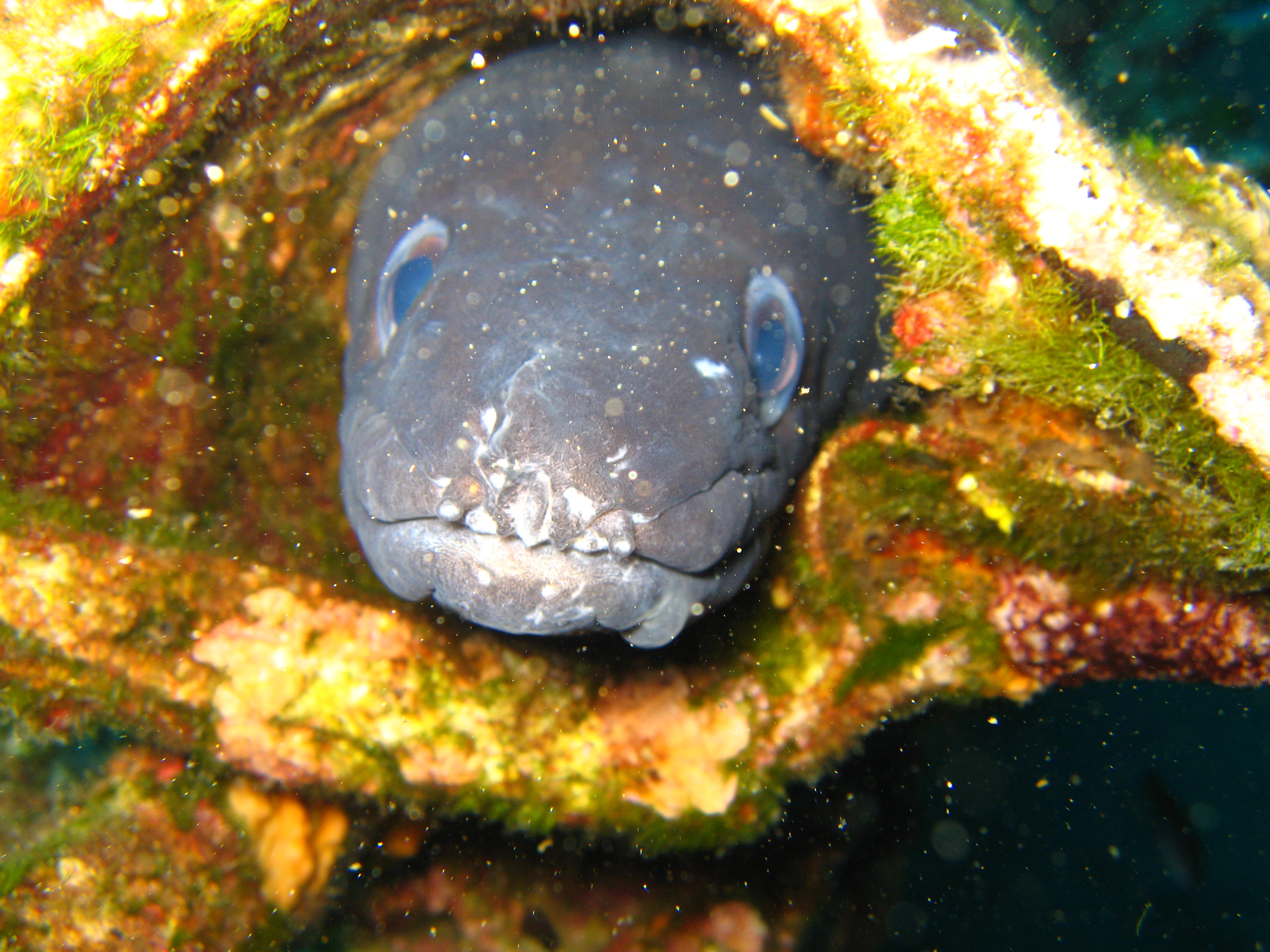
Conger conger

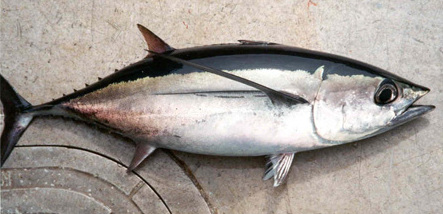
Thunnus alalunga

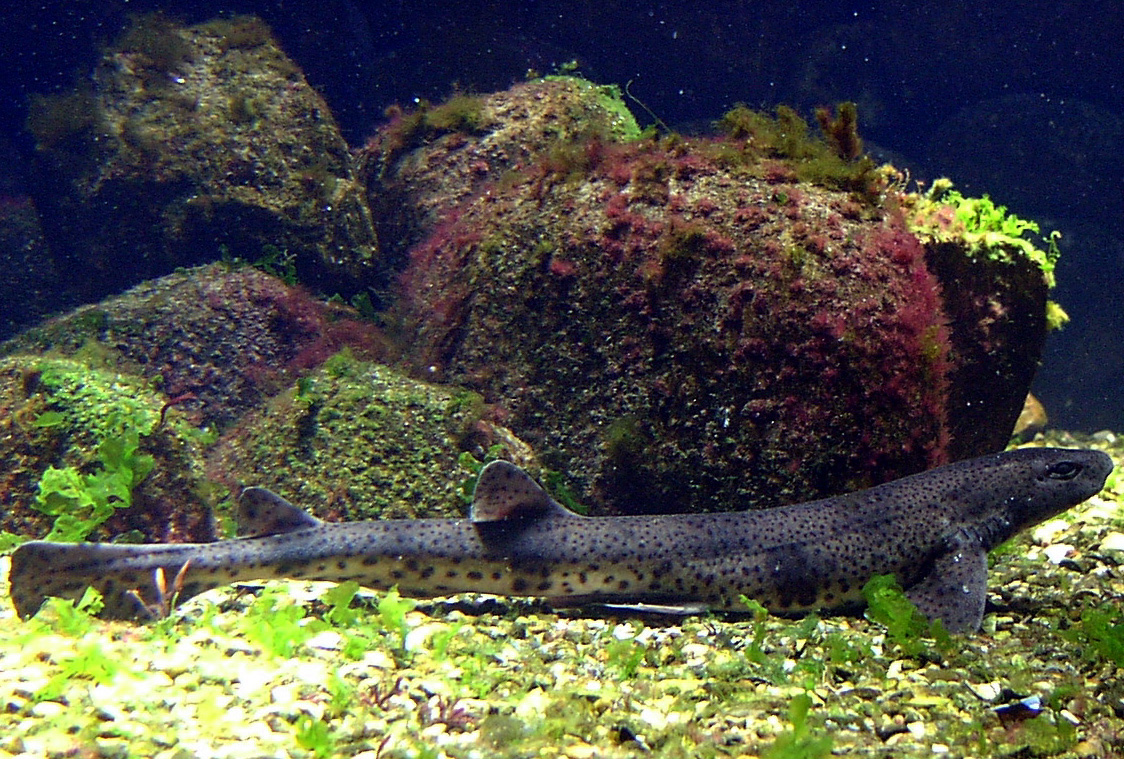
Scyliorhinus canicula

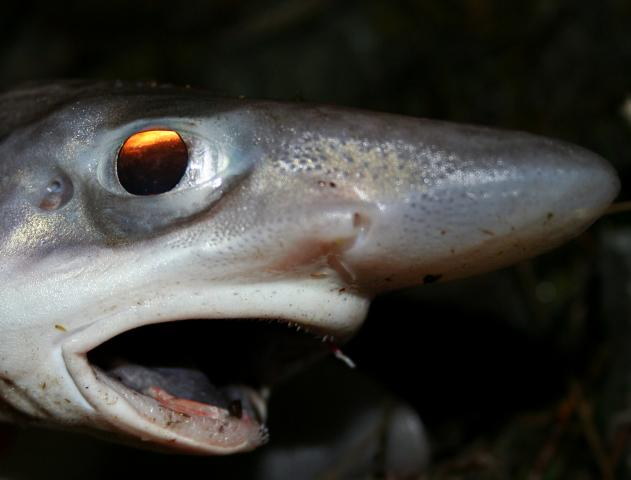
Galeus melastomus

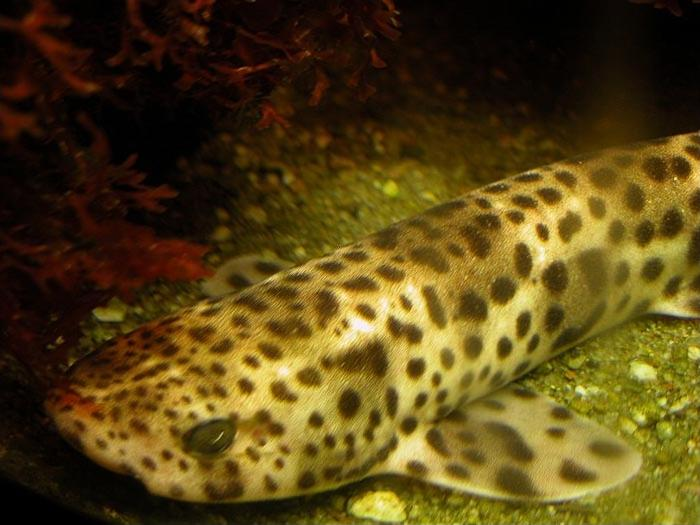
Scyliorhinus stellaris

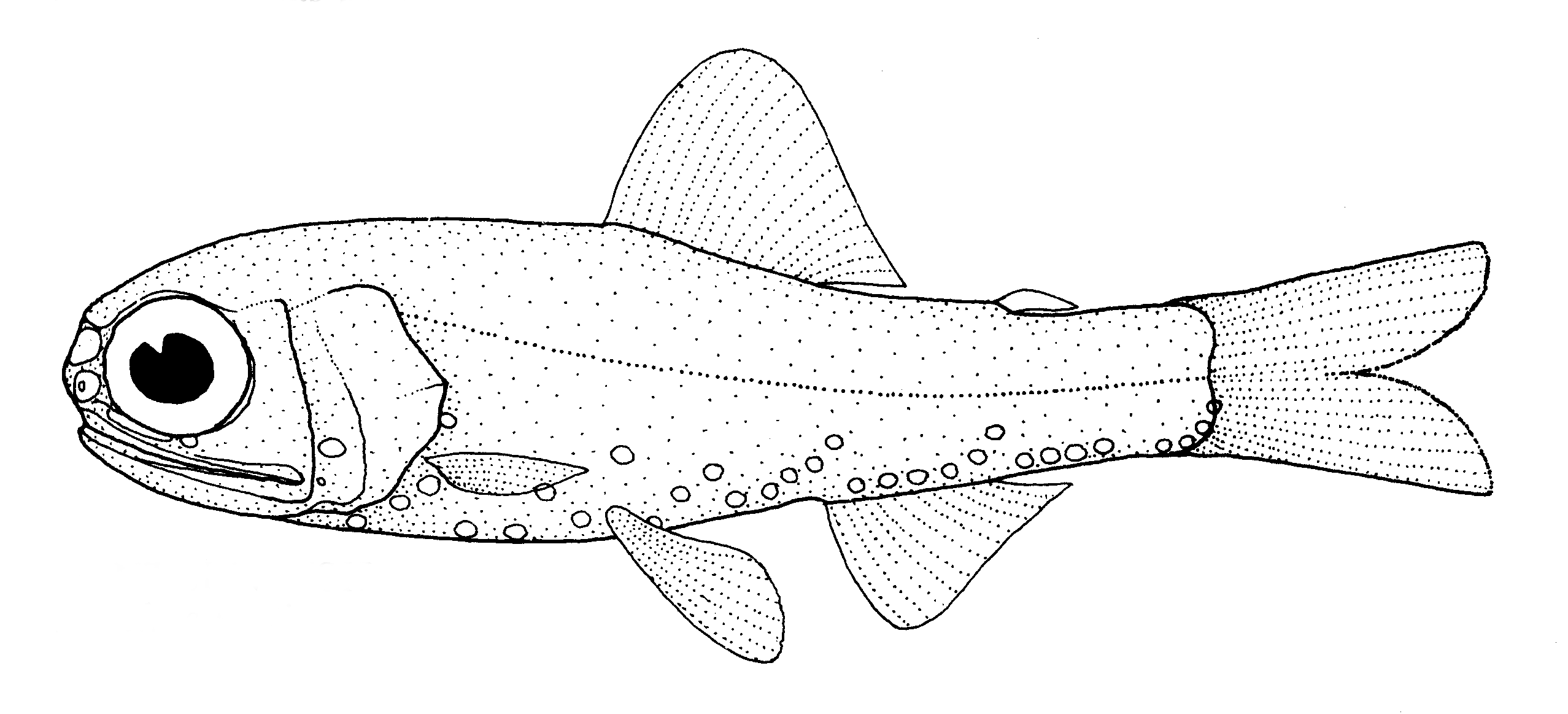
Diaphus holti

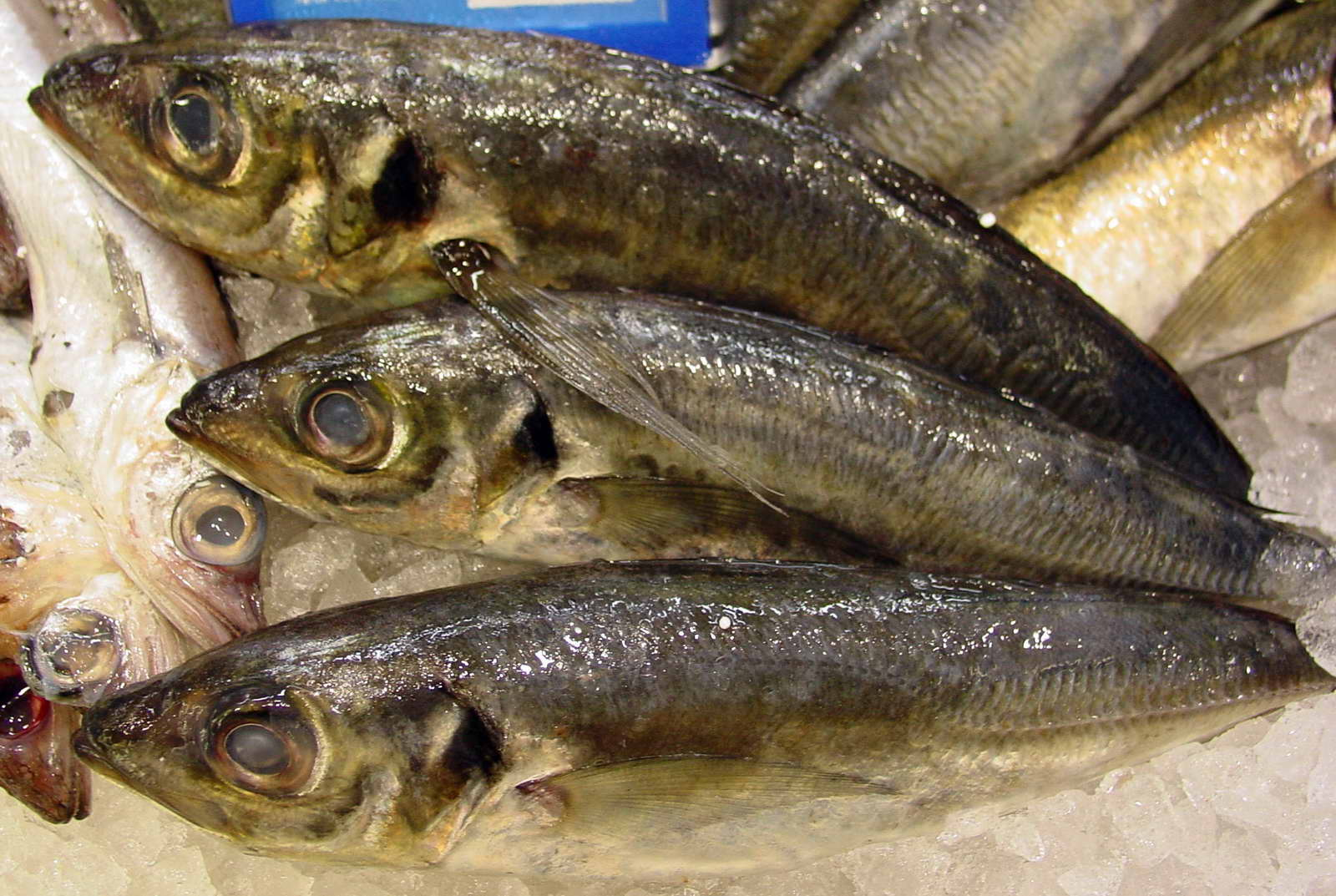
Trachurus trachurus

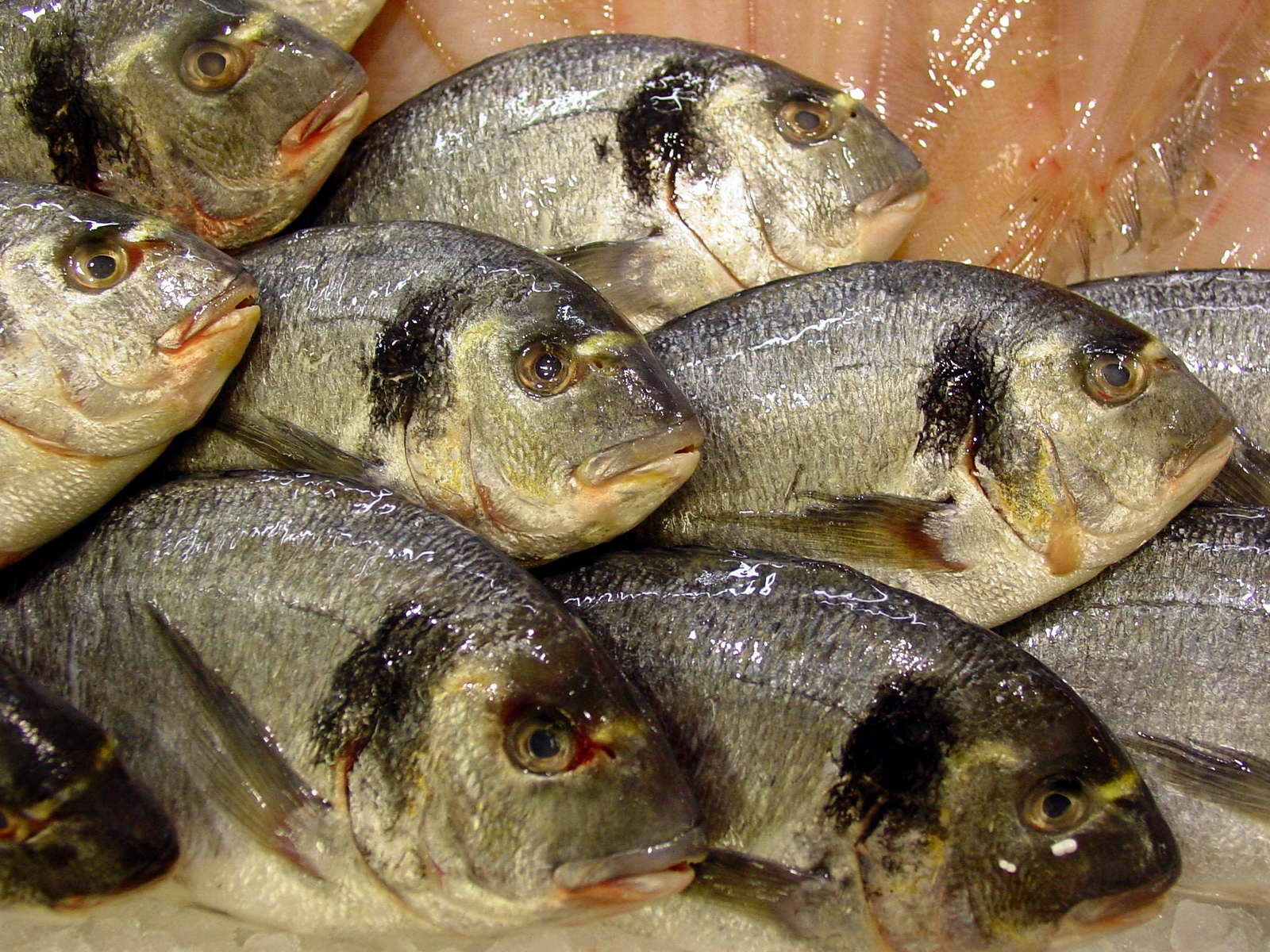
Sparus aurata

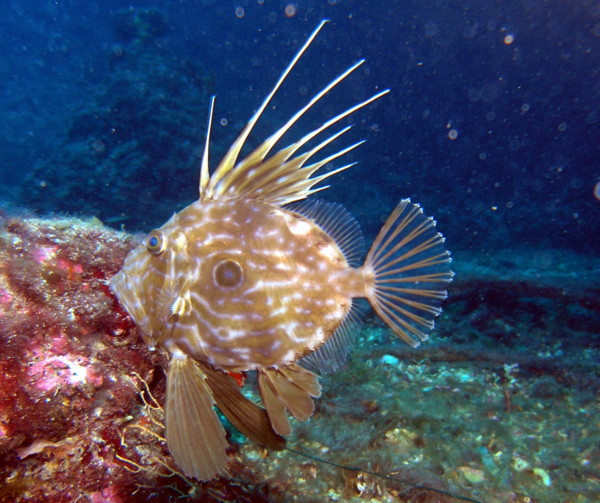
Zeus faber

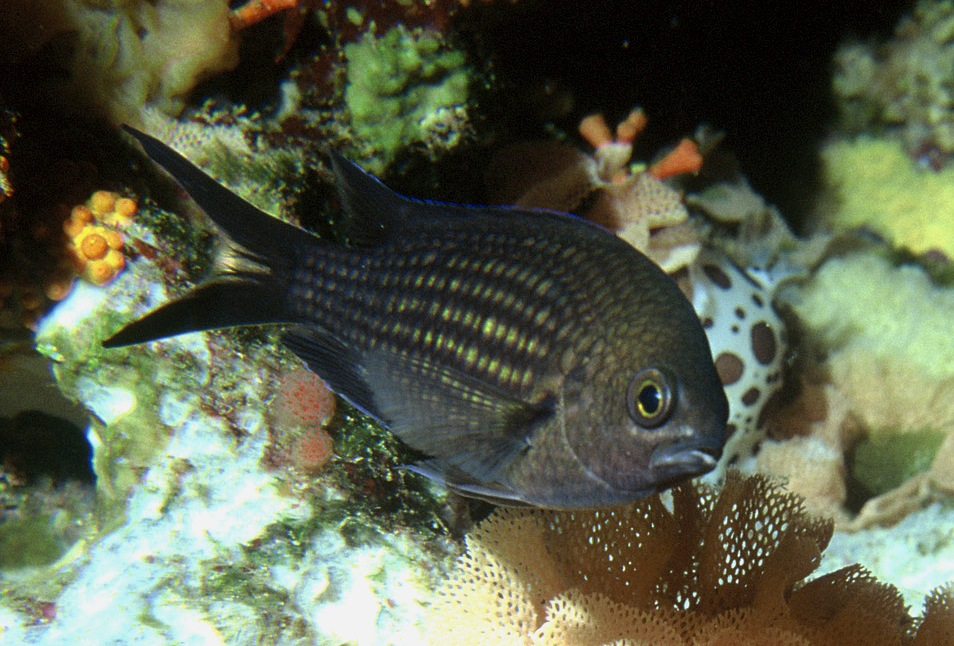
Chromis chromis

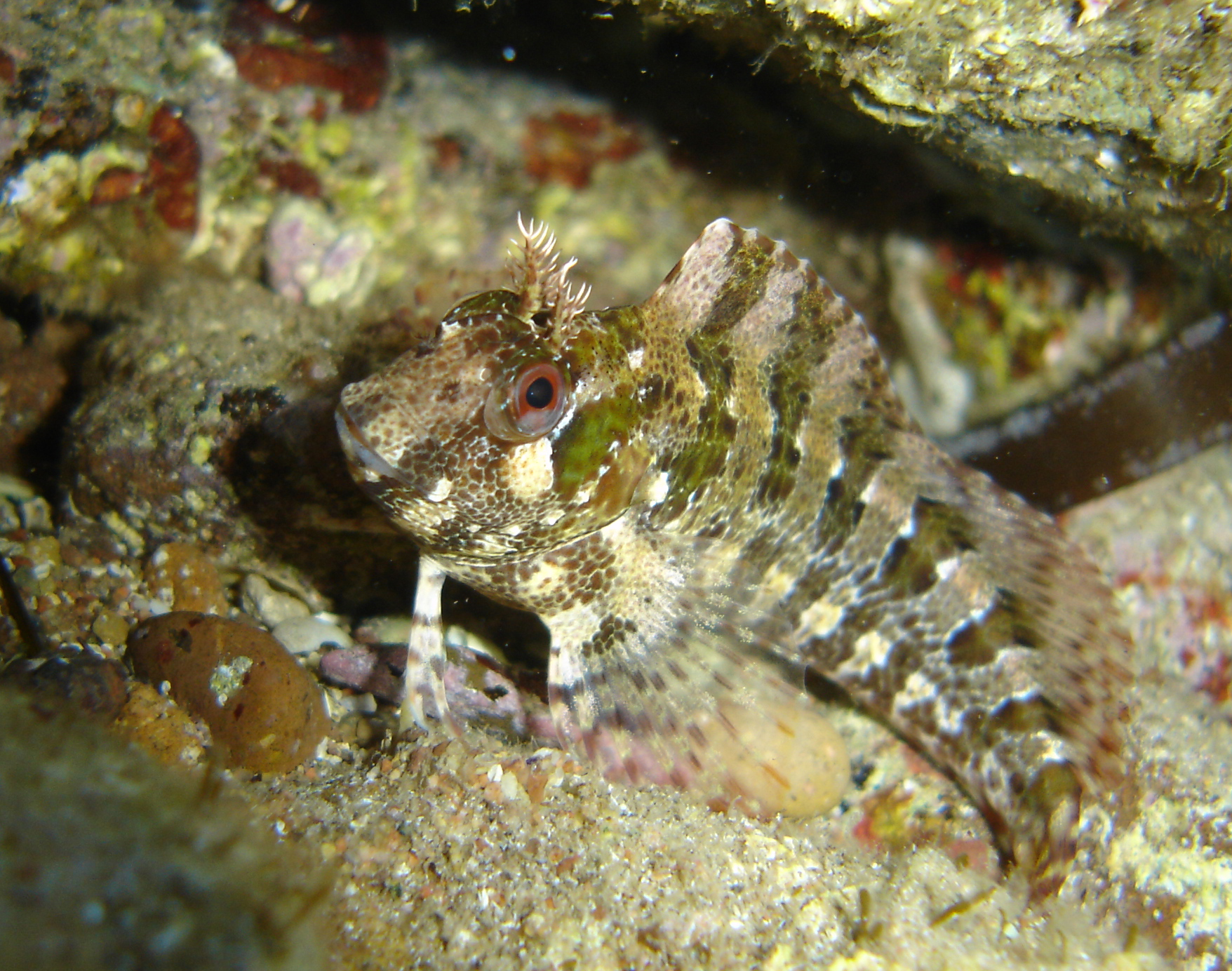
Parablennius gattorugine

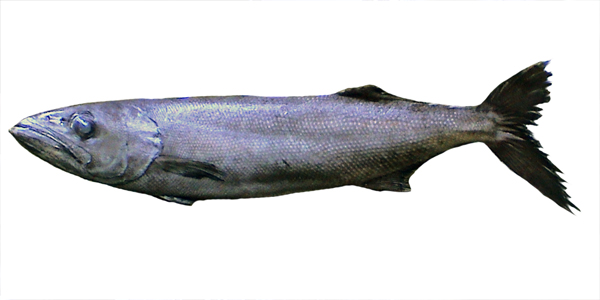
Ruvettus pretiosus

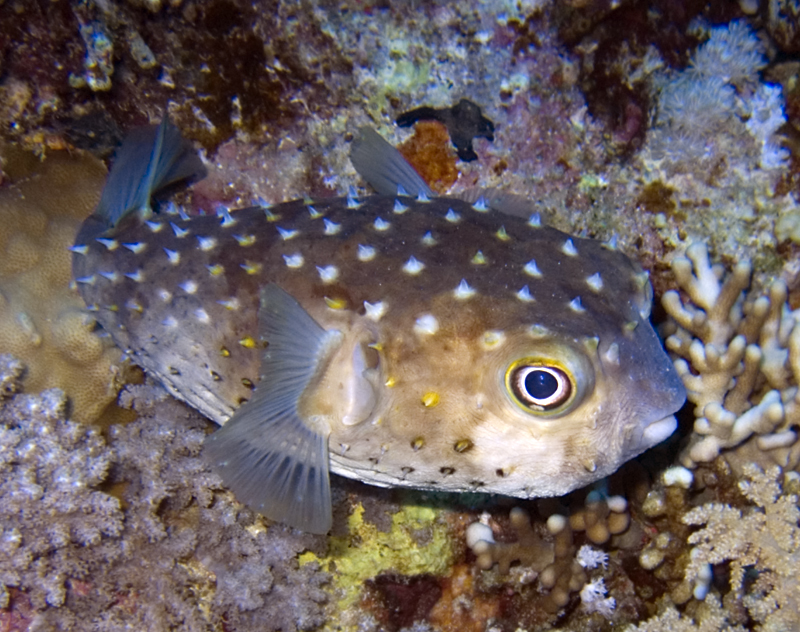
Cyclichthys spilostylus

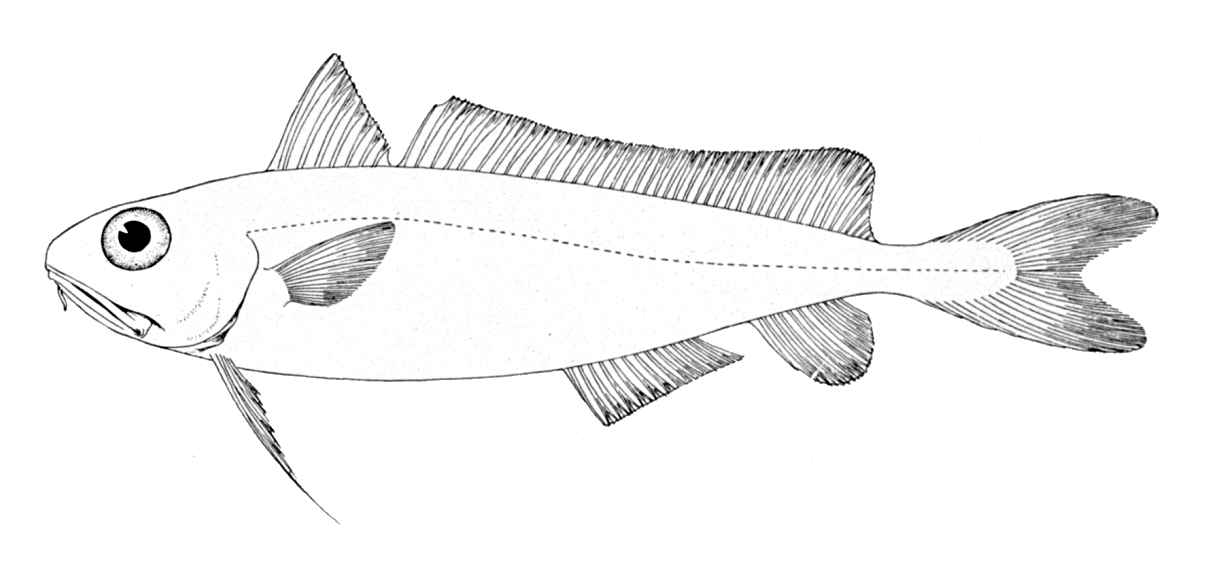
Mora moro

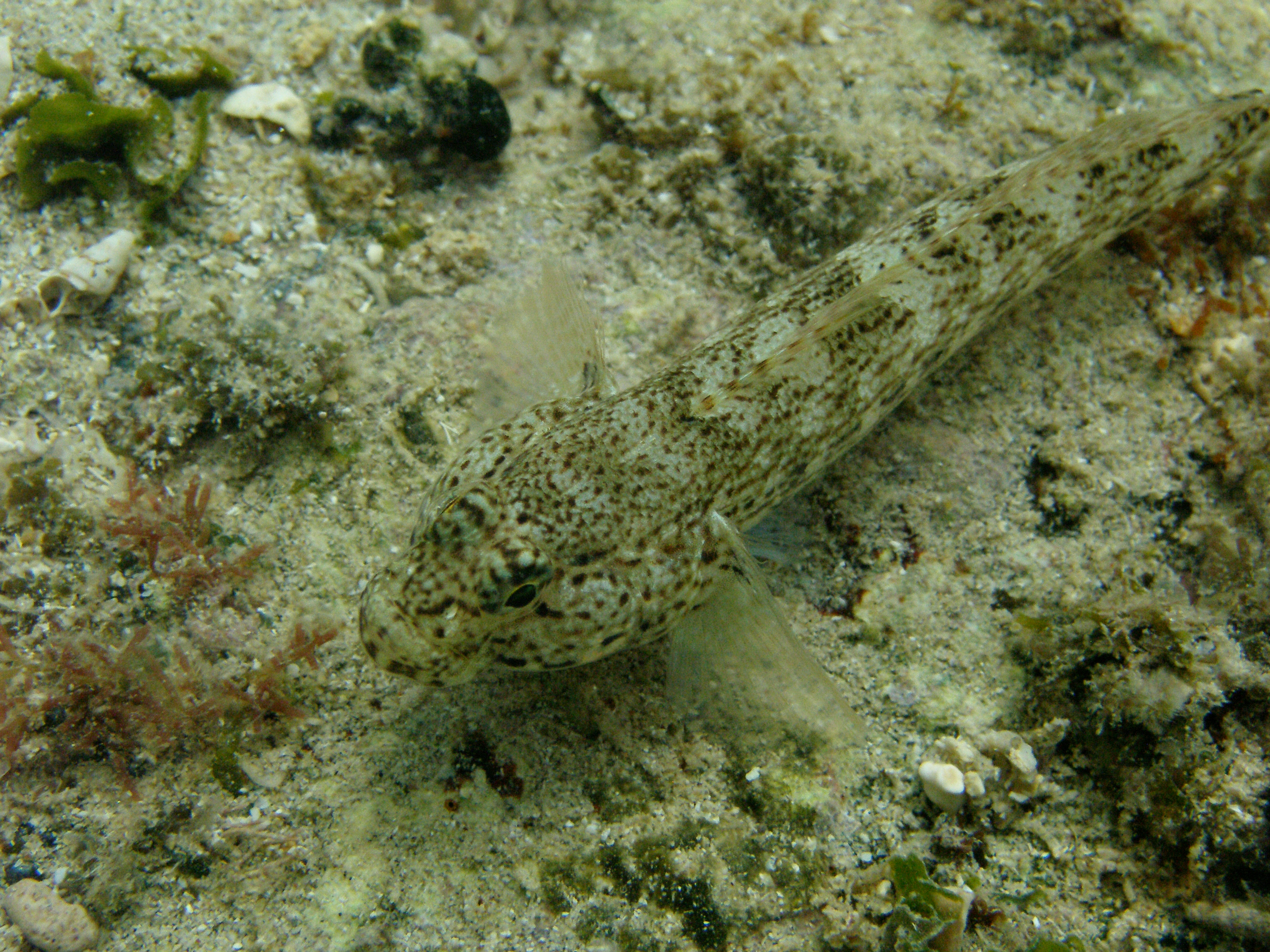
Gobius bucchichi

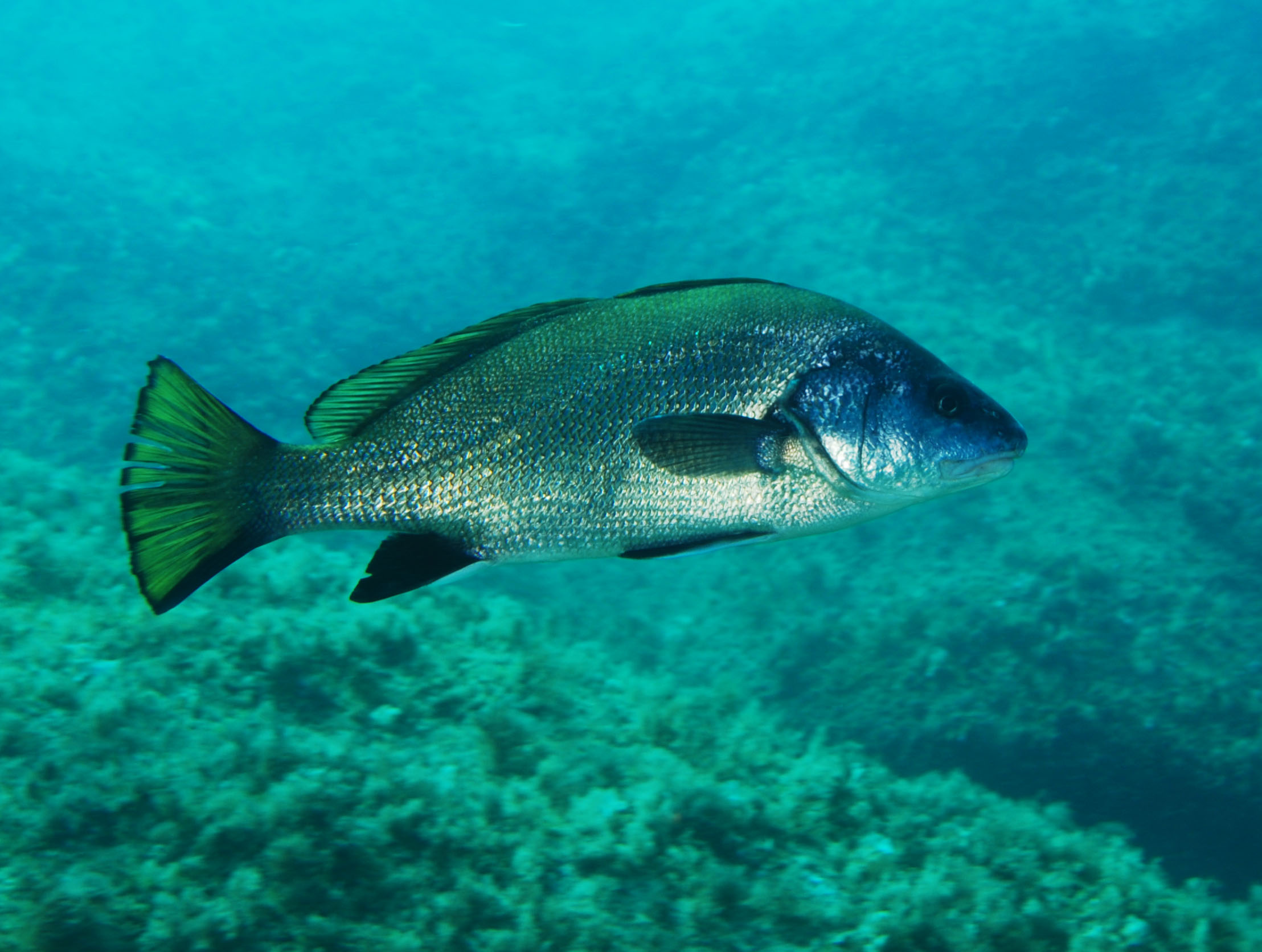
Sciaena umbra

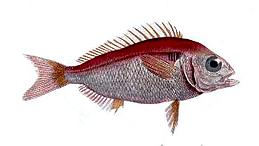
Pagellus bogaraveo

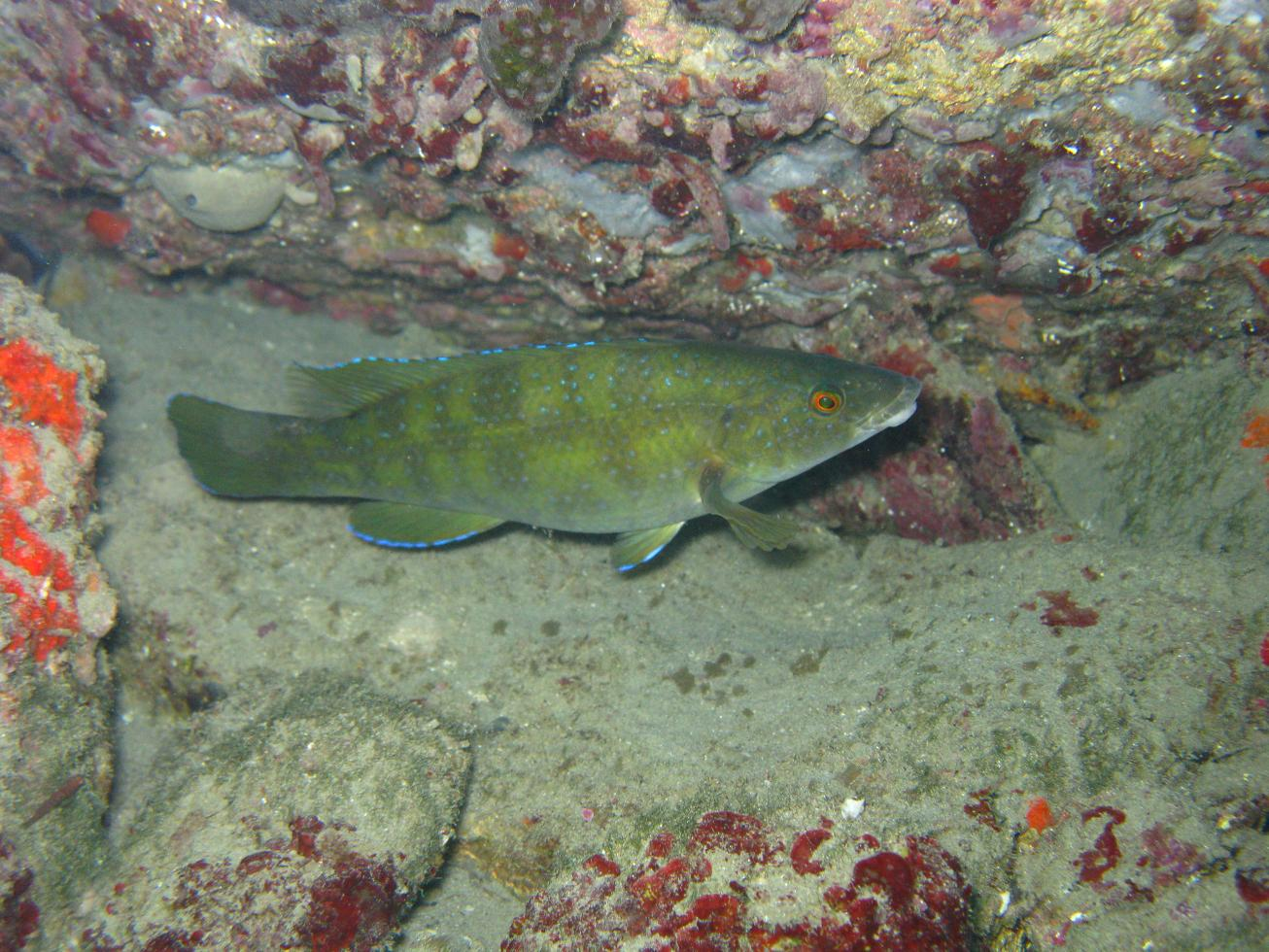
Labrus merula

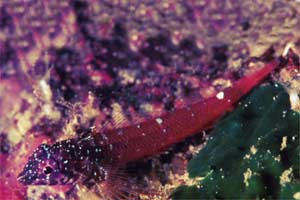
Tripterygion melanurus

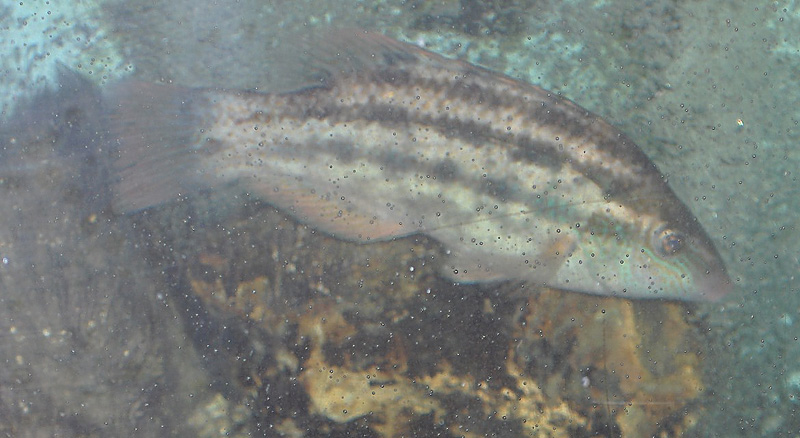
Symphodus roissali

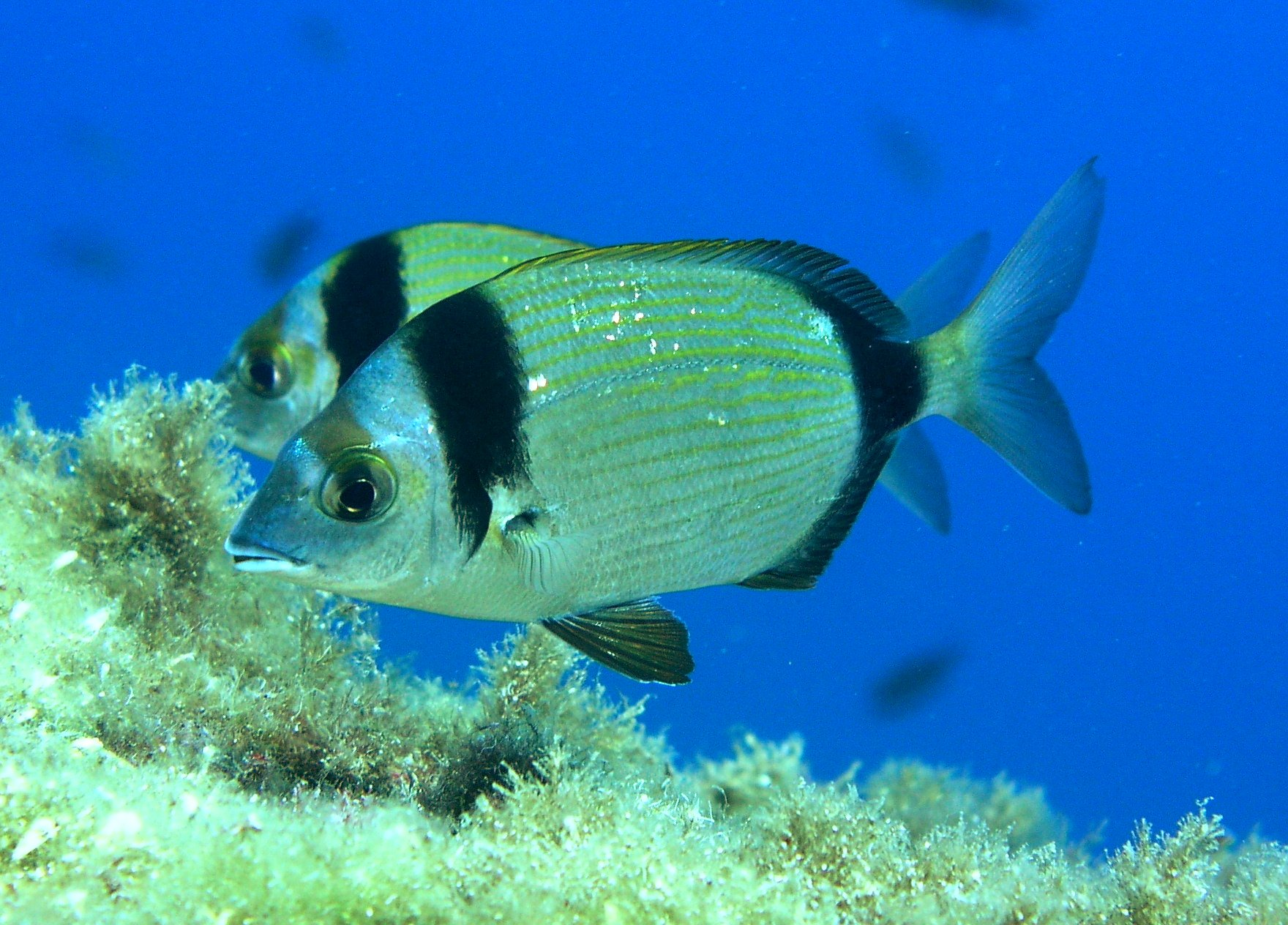
Diplodus vulgaris

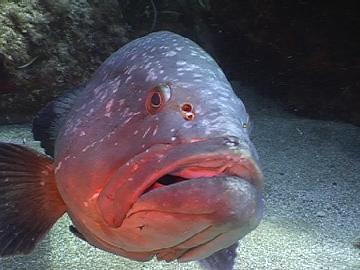
Epinephelus marginatus

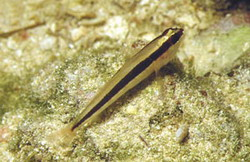
Gobius vittatus

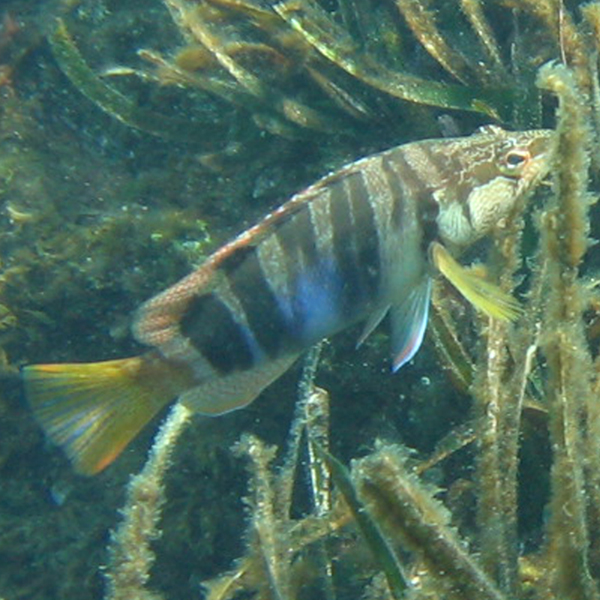
Serranus scriba

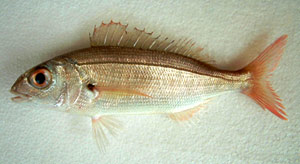
Pagellus acarne

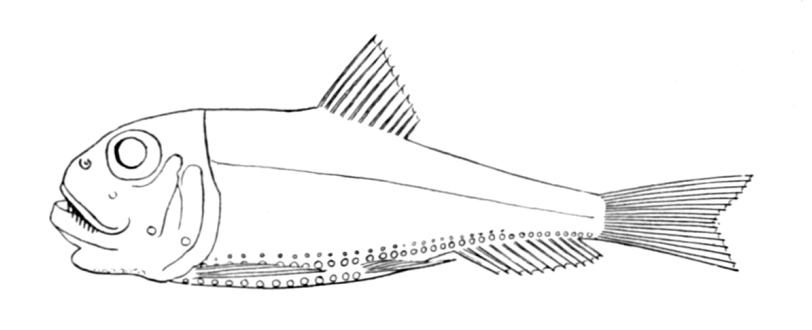
Ichthyococcus ovatus

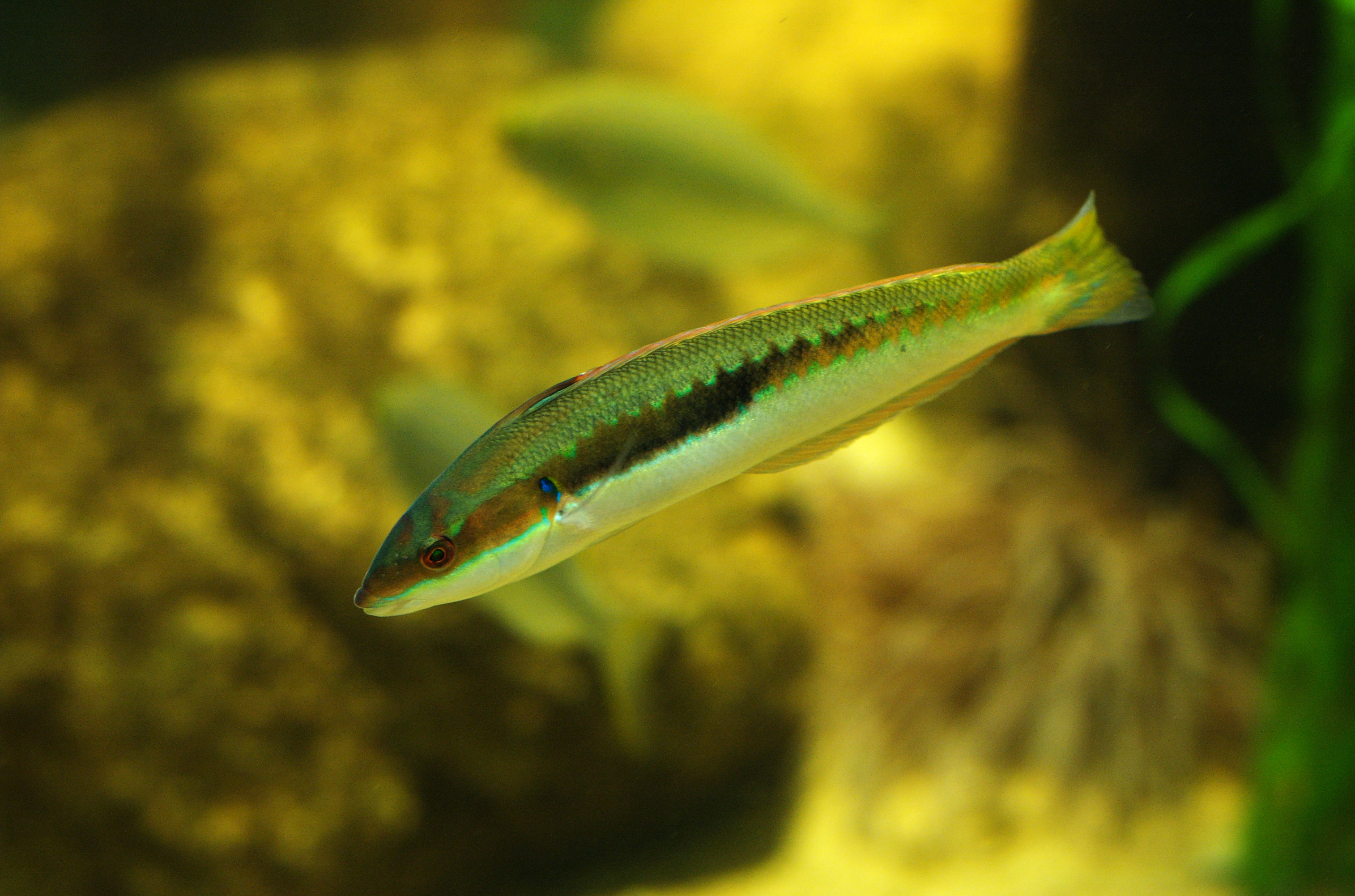
Coris julis

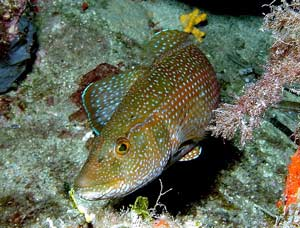
Labrus viridis

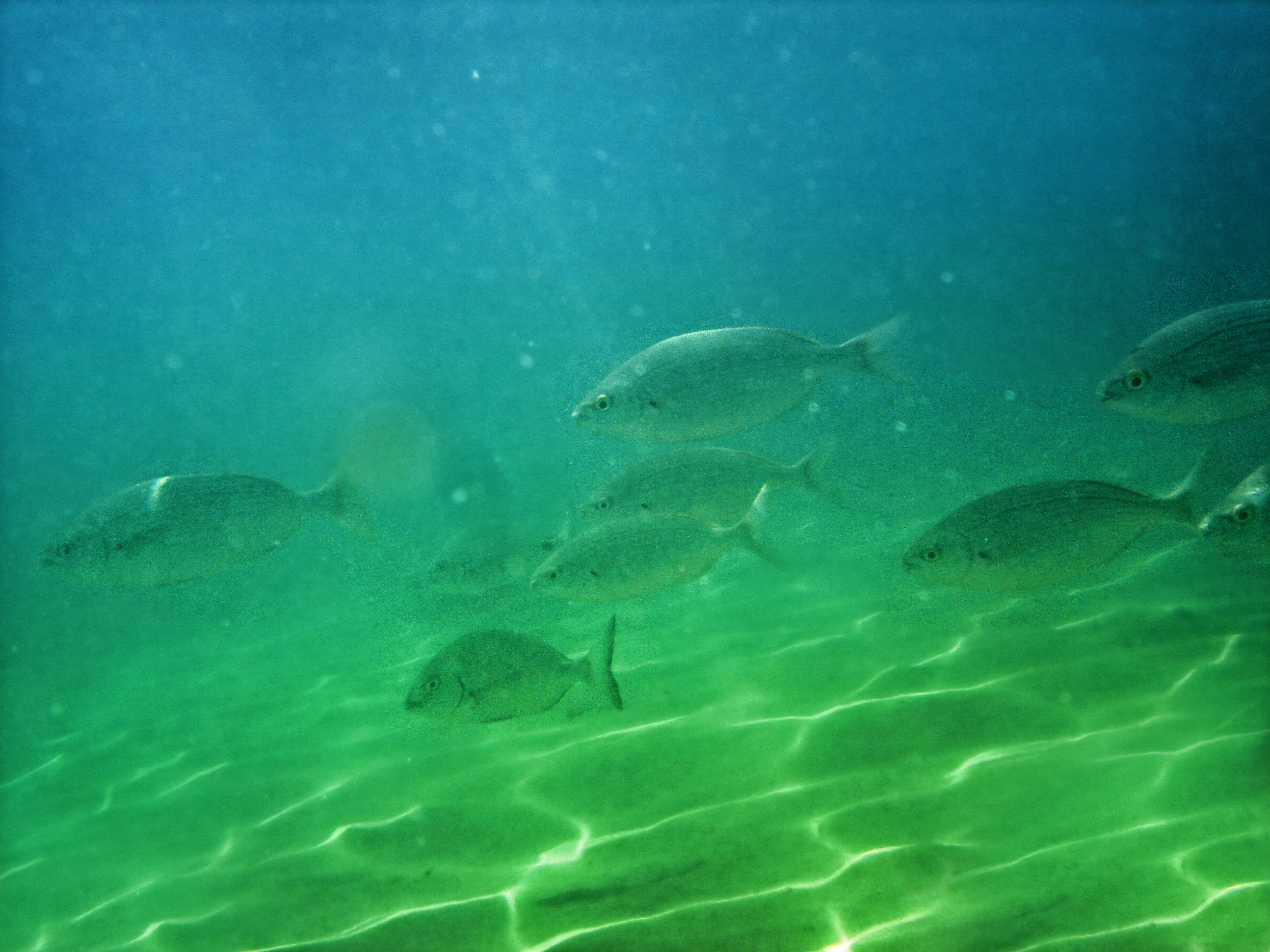
Pomadasys incisus

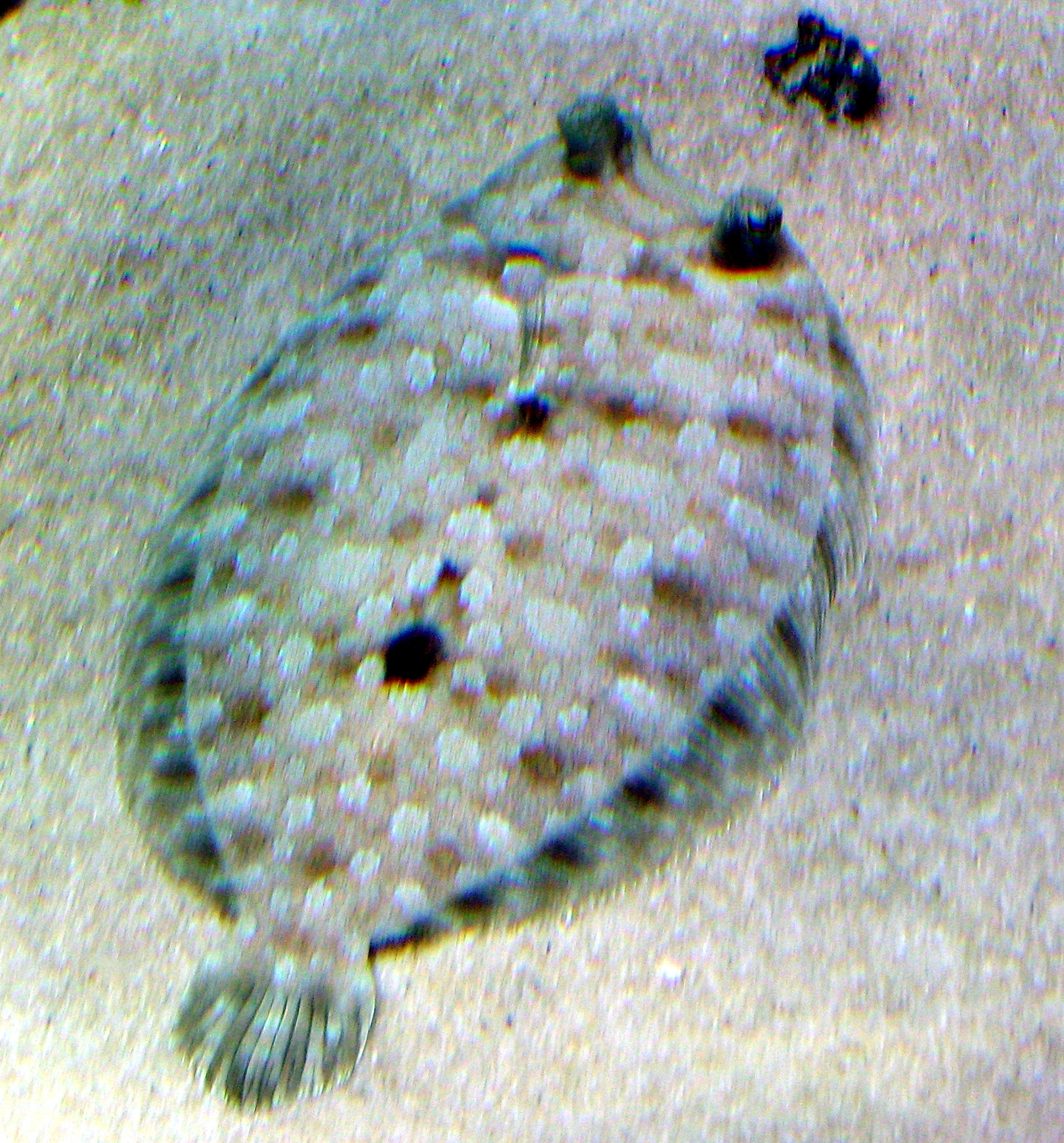
Bothus podas

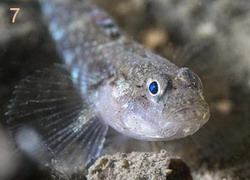
Buenia affinis

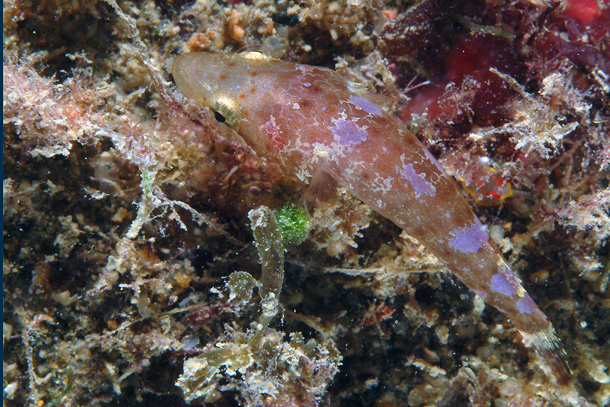
Apletodon incognitus

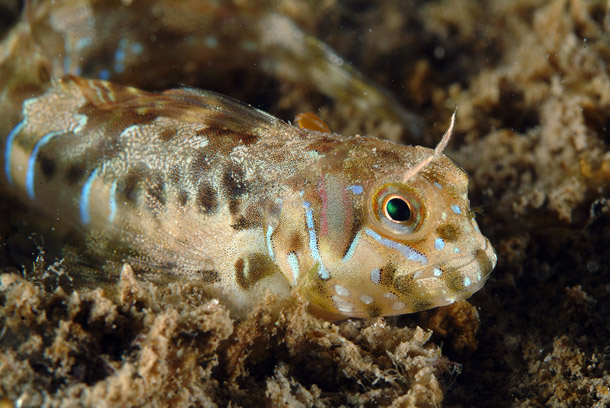
Aidablennius sphynx

Chlopsis bicolor

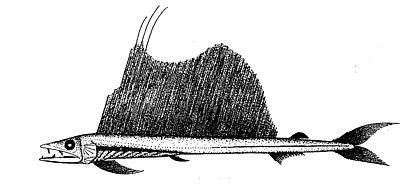
Alepisaurus ferox

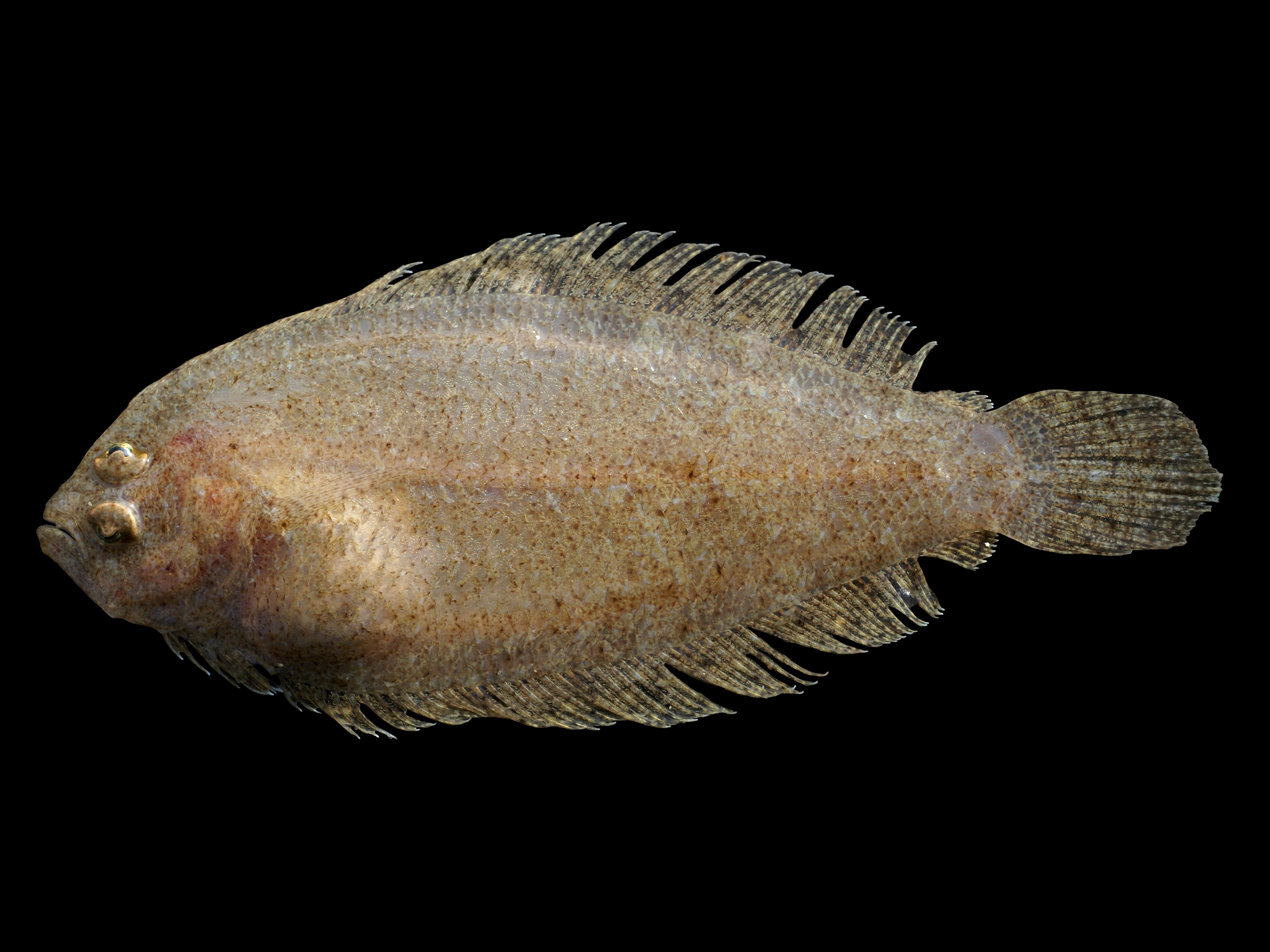
Peluda vera (Arnoglossus laterna)

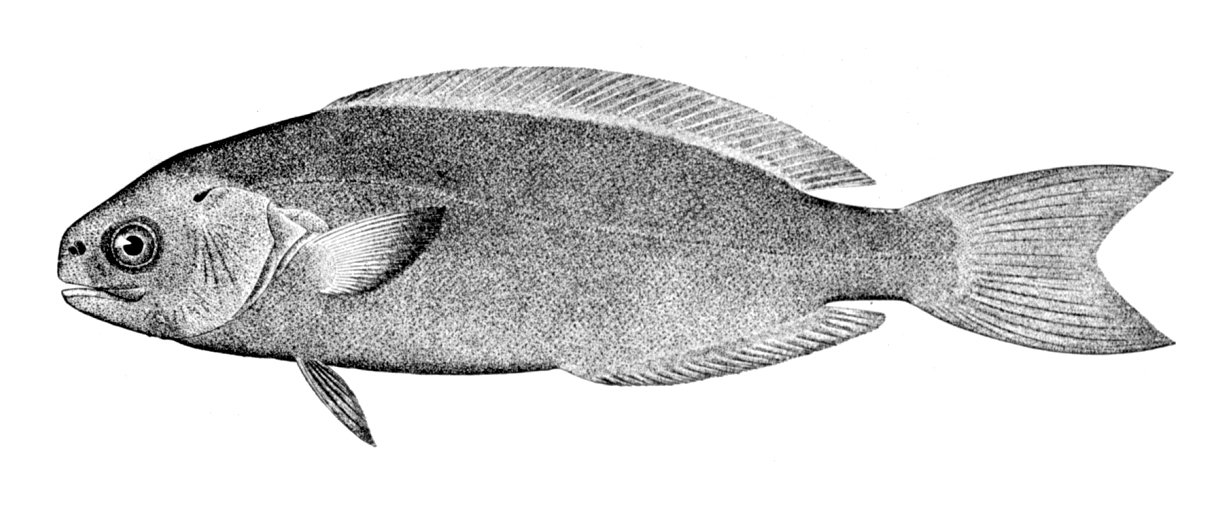
Centrolophus niger

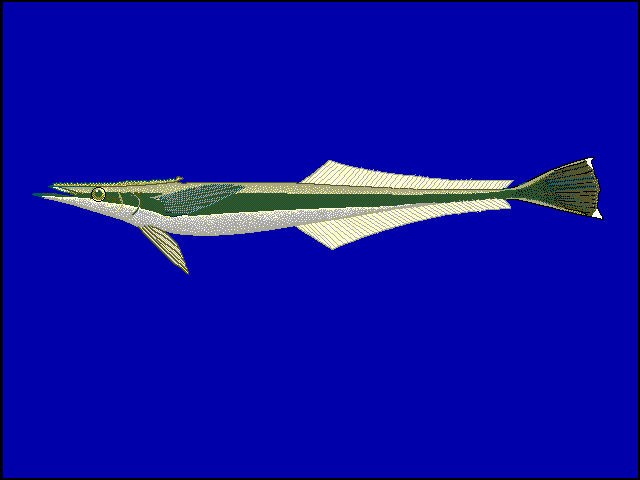
Echeneis naucrates

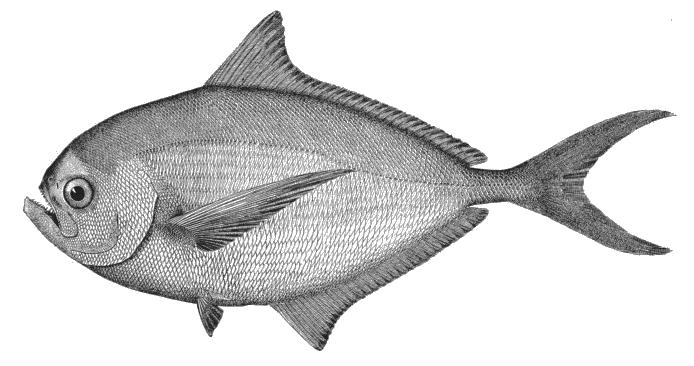
Brama brama

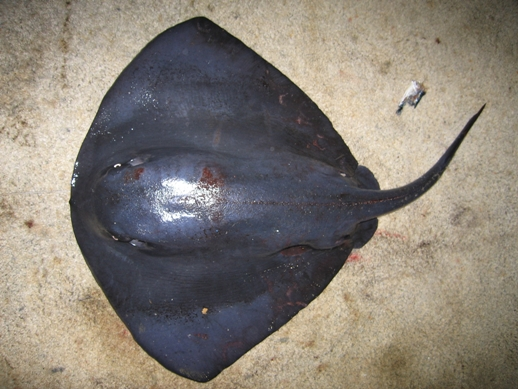
Dasyatis violacea

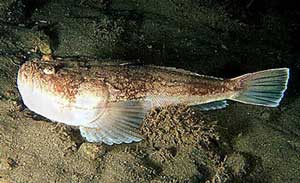
Uranoscopus scaber

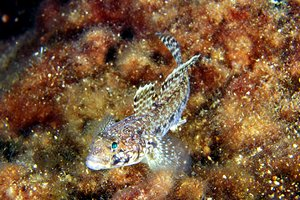
Gobius geniporus

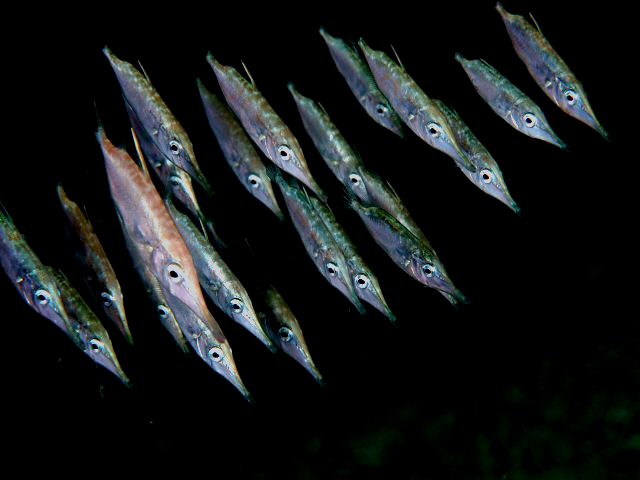
Macroramphosus scolopax

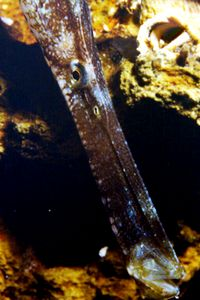
Syngnathus typhle

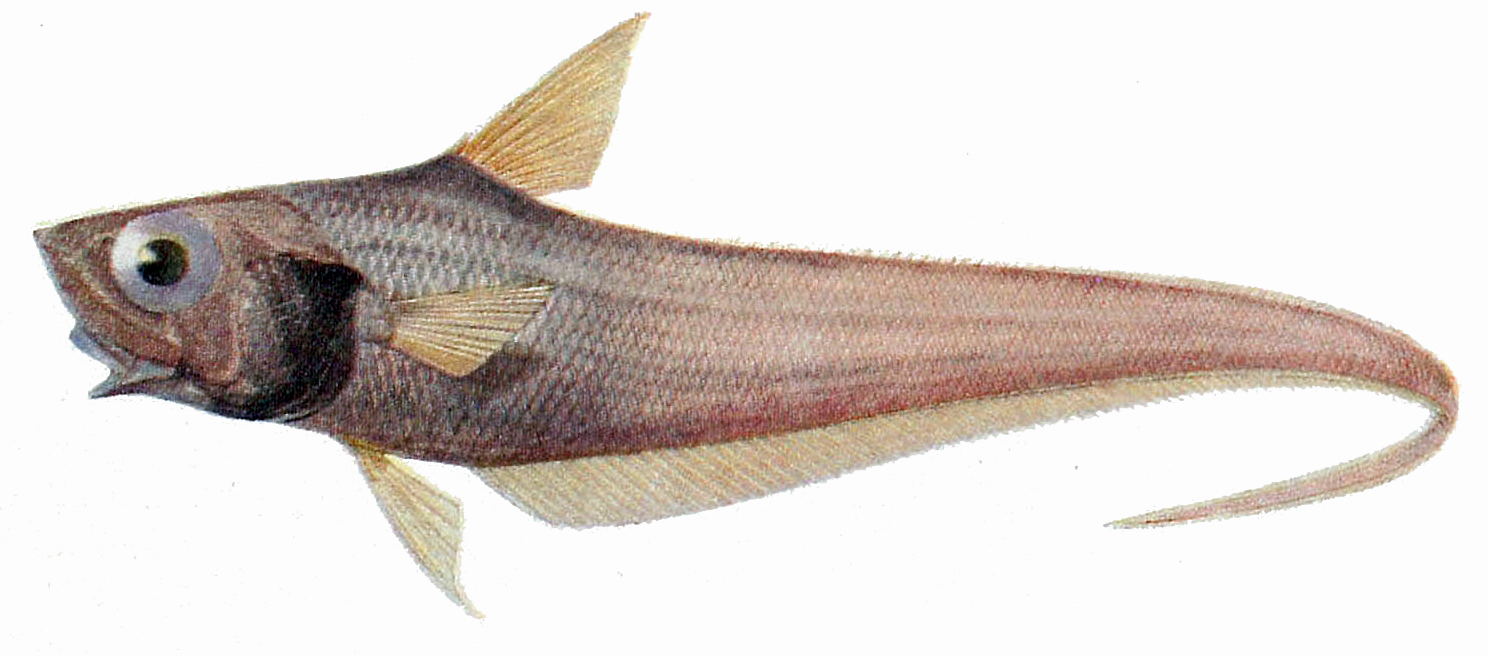
Nezumia aequalis

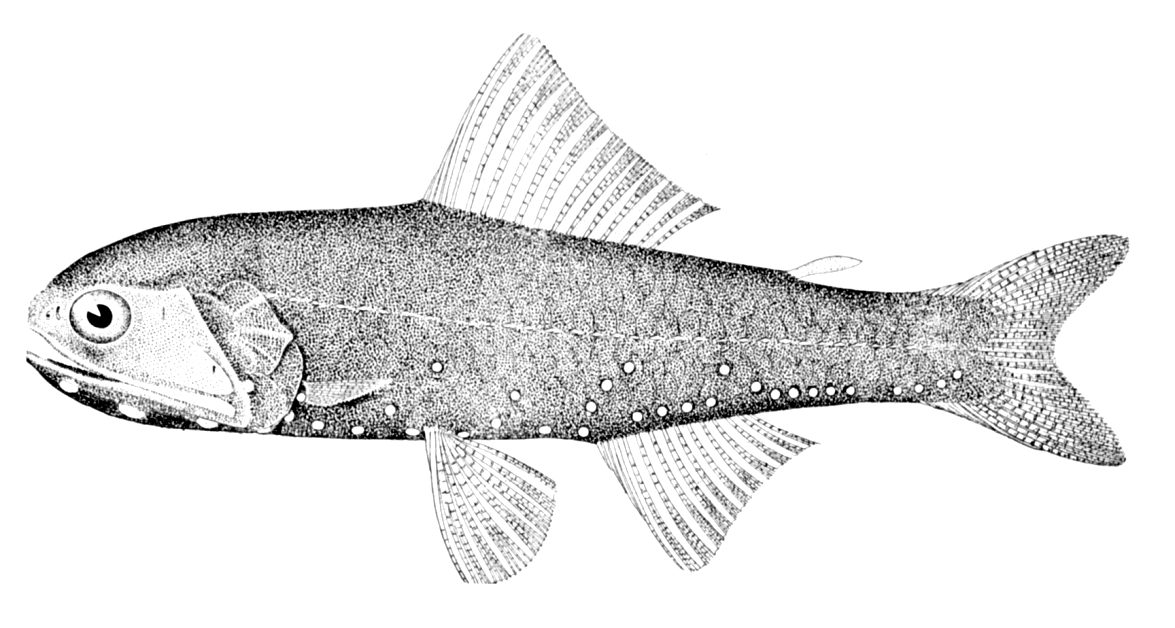
Lobianchia gemellarii

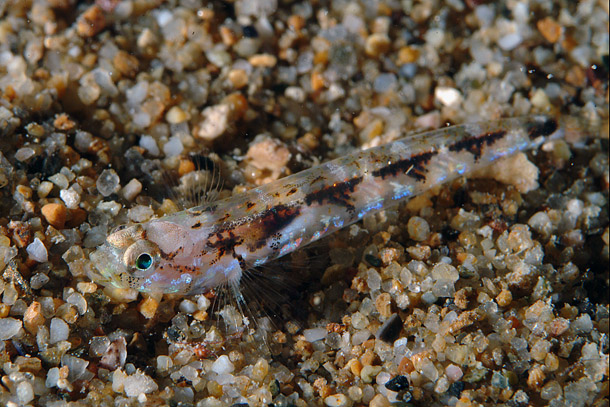
Pomatoschistus bathi

== Sources ==
- Bent J. Muus, Jørgen G. Nielsen: Die Meeresfische Europas. In Nordsee, Ostsee und Atlantik. Franckh-Kosmos Verlag, ISBN 3440078043.
- Matthias Bergbauer, Bernd Humberg: Was lebt im Mittelmeer? 1999, Franckh-Kosmos Verlag, ISBN 3-440-07733-0.
- Fishbase: Fishspecies in Mediterranean Sea
- Jennings G.H. MedFish 2000 The Taxonomic Checklist and the 2004 CD Update. Calypso Publications, London:, ISBN 0 906301 82 3.

== See also ==
- List of fish of the Black Sea
- List of mammals of the Mediterranean Sea
- List of reptiles of the Mediterranean Sea
