= Microcotyle sebastisci =

Scientific classification
- Kingdom: Animalia
- Phylum: Platyhelminthes
- Class: Monogenea
- Order: Mazocraeidea
- Family: Microcotylidae
- Genus: Microcotyle
- Species: M. sebastisci

Binomial name
- Microcotyle sebastisci Yamaguti, 1958

Synonyms
- Paramicrocotyle sebastisci (Yamaguti, 1958) Caballero & Bravo-Hollis, 1972; Caenomicrocotyle (Caenomicrocotyle) sebastisci (Yamaguti, 1958) Unnithan, 1971

Species of worms

Microcotyle sebastisci is a species of monogenean, parasitic on the gills of marine fish. It belongs to the family Microcotylidae.

== Systematics ==
Microcotyle sebastisci was first described by Yamaguti in 1958, from mature specimens only, out of 41 specimens recovered from three Sebastidae Sebastiscus marmoratus, Sebastodes güntheri (currently Sebastes ventricosus) and Sebastichthys pachycephalus (currently Sebastes pachycephalus) and one Serranidae Epinephelus akaara . Unnithan erected the genus Caenomicrocotyle and the subgenus Caenomicrocotyle and transferred Microcotyle sebastisci as Caenomicrocotyle (Caenomicrocotyle) sebastisci. In 1972, Caballero y Caballero and Bravo-Hollis erected the genus Paramicrocotyle to describe Paramicrocotyle tampicensis and Paramicrocotyle atriobursata off Mexico and placed within this genus sixteen species previously assigned to the genus Microcotyle including Microcotyle sebastisci, as Paramicrocotyle sebastisci. Mamaev, in his revision of the family Microcotylidae, considered Paramicrocotyle a junior subjective synonym of Microcotyle.

== Morphology ==
Microcotyle sebastisci has the general morphology of all species of Microcotyle, with a flattened, fusiform body with an anterior end forming a flat elevation beyond the anterior buccal suckers. The body comprises an anterior part which contains most organs and a posterior part called the haptor. The haptor is wedge-shaped, and bears 29–62 clamps(11–31 clamps on each side), arranged as two rows. The clamps of the haptor attach the animal to the gill of the fish. There are also two buccal suckersslightly smaller than the pharynx at the anterior extremity. The digestive organs include an anterior, terminal mouth, a globular pharynx, and a posterior intestine with two branches provided with irregular outer and inner branches; the right branch ends at the posterior end the body proper while the left one extends into the haptor. Each adult contains male and female reproductive organs. The reproductive organs include a reniform genital atrium, surrounded by radiating muscle fibers and covered inside with short spines except for the median anterodorsal areas, an oval to elliptical unarmed vagina opening middorsally at the anterior end, a single ovary in form of an interrogation mark, 8-20 testes that occupy the whole postovarian intercecal field. Eggs are fusiform, with a long filament at each pole.

== Etymology ==
The specific epithet sebastisci is derived from the generic name of the type-host Sebastiscus marmoratus.

== Diagnosis ==
According to Yamaguti, Microcotyle sebastisci is most closely related to Microcotyle tanago as indicated by the general shape of the body, and the two species can be distinguished by the presence of a prominent conical cirrus in Microcotyle sebastisci. Microcotyle sebastisci differs from Microcotyle ditrematis in the shape and organisation of the genital atrium, and the size and structure of the cirrus. Microcotyle sebastisci also resembles Microcotyle caudata and Microcotyle sebastis in the number of clamps, but they differ in the number of testes and egg size.

== Hosts and localities ==
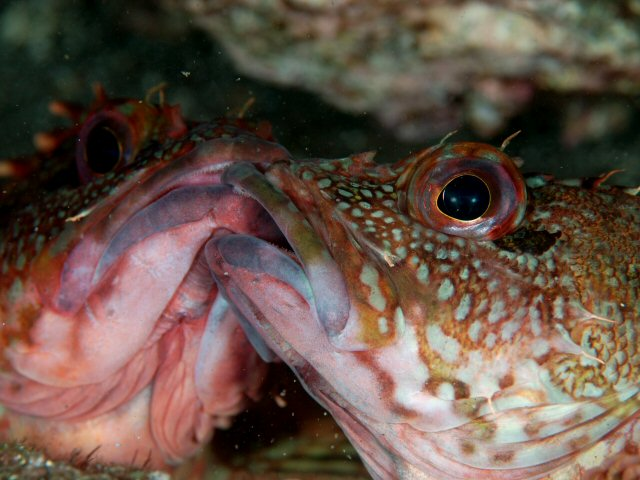
The type-host of Microcotyle sebastisci is the False Kelpfish Sebastiscus marmoratus

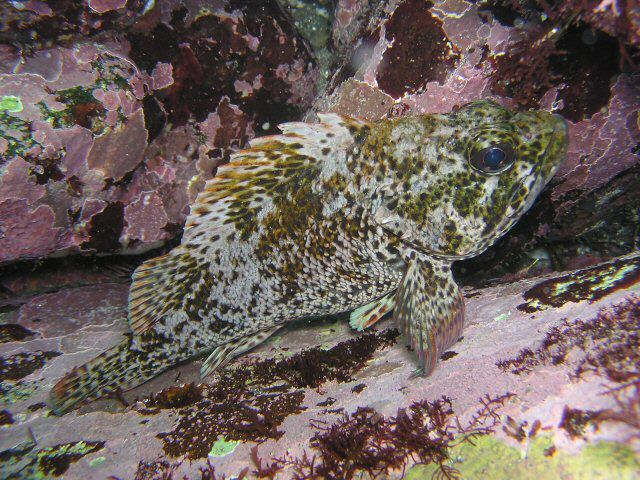
Sebastes pachycephalus is also recorded as host of Microcotyle sebastisci

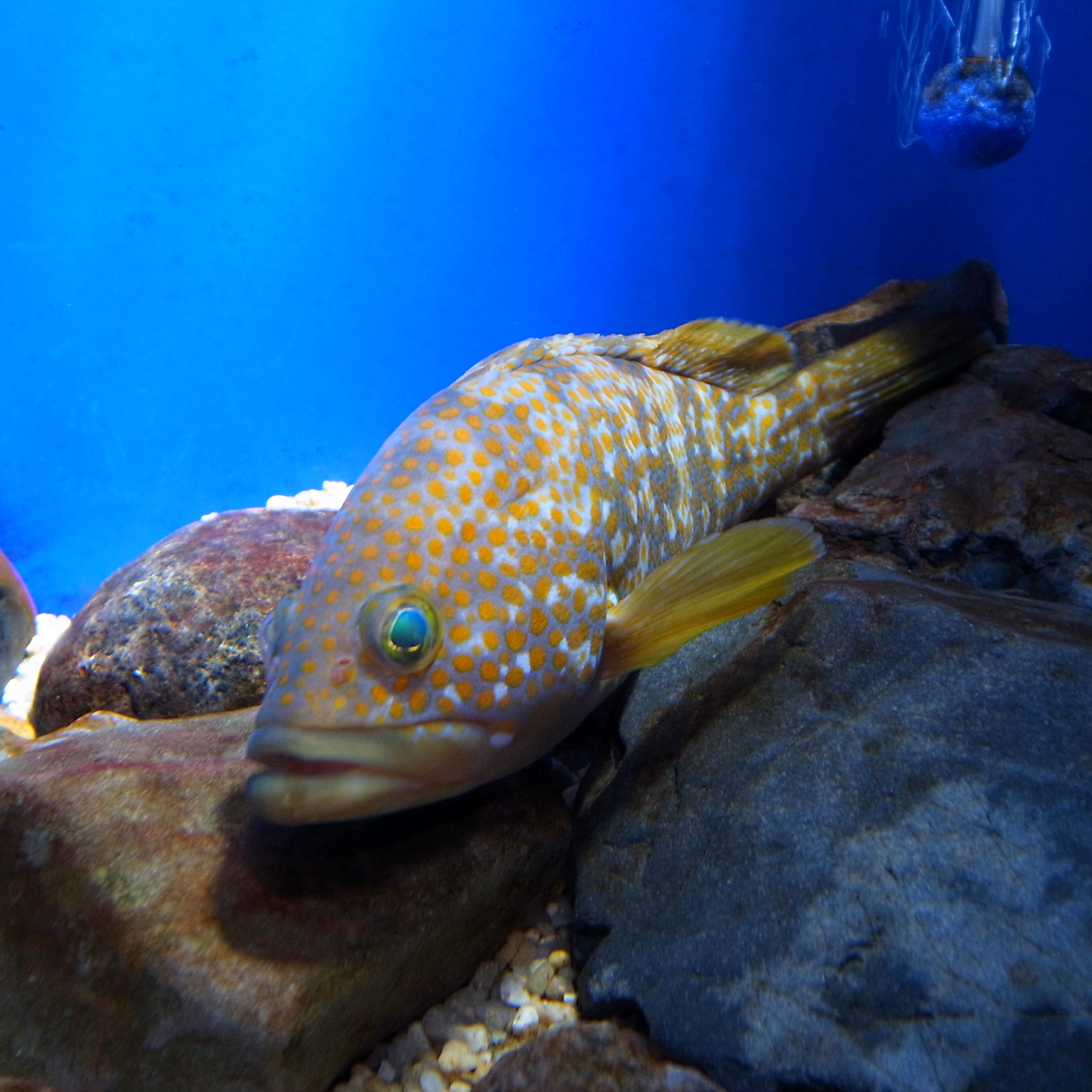
The Hong Kong grouper Epinephelus akaara is also considered host of Microcotyle sebastisci

The type-host of Microcotyle sebastisci is the False Kelpfish Sebastiscus marmoratus (Sebastidae). It was also recorded on two other Sebastidae; the rockfish Sebastodes guntheri and Sebastichthys pachycephalus (currently Sebastes pachycephalus). Yamaguti recorded the Hong Kong grouper Epinephelus akaara (Serranidae) as host of Microcotyle sebastisci. The record of this species on the black Scorpionfish, Scorpaena porcus (Scorpaenidae) is uncertain. Microcotyle sebastisci was first described from fish from the Inland Sea and Sagami Bay (Japan). It was also recorded off Nagasaki and Ōita (Japan) as well as off Naples, Italy.
