= Rockfish =

Rockfish is a common term for several species of fish, referring to their tendency to hide among rocks.

The name rockfish is used for many kinds of fish used for food. This common name belongs to several groups that are not closely related, and can be arbitrary.

Specific examples of fish termed rockfish include:

- The family Sebastidae, marine fishes that inhabit oceans around the world. They may be included in the family Scorpaenidae.
  - Sebastes, a commercially important genus of fish in the Sebastidae inhabiting mainly the North Pacific, but with a few species in the North Atlantic and southern oceans
  - In Washington State, many species of Sebastes and a few of Sebastolobus are called rockfish.
- Acanthoclinus, a genus of fish from New Zealand
- Bull huss or bull huss (Scyliorhinus stellaris), a shark known as rock salmon when used in cuisine
- Hexagrammos, a genus of greenling from the North Pacific
- Hypoplectrodes, a genus of fish in the family Serranidae
- Salvelinus, a genus of fish in the salmon family
- The stonefishes (genus Synanceia), venomous fishes from the Indo-Pacific
- Striped bass (Morone saxatilis), called rockfish on the Atlantic coast of North America from New Jersey south
- Groupers, fish in the subfamily Epinephelinae
- Certain fish of genus Scorpaena, such as the Madeira rockfish (S. maderensis), a common Mediterranean species
- Myliobatis goodei, which is sometimes called "rockfish"
