= Eastern red scorpionfish =

Eastern red scorpionfish may refer to:

- Scorpaena cardinalis, also called the grandfather hapuku, cardinal scorpionfish, Cook's scorpionfish, Cook's rockcod, Kermadec scorpionfish, Northern scorpionfish, red scorpion fish, red scorpion-cod or Sandy-bay cod, from northern New Zealand and the islands of the Tasman Sea.
- Scorpaena jacksoniensis, also called Billy Bougain, cardinal scorpionfish, coral cod, coral perch, Eastern red scorpioncod, fire cod, Northern scorpionfish, ocean perch, prickly heat, red rockcod or red scorpion-cod, endemic to southeastern Australia.
