= List of organisms with the common name Ruffe =

Fish common name set index page

The ruffe or Eurasian ruffe (Gymnocephalus cernuus) is a widespread freshwater fish in Eurasia and introduced to North America.

Ruffe may also refer to:

- Any fish of the genus Gymnocephalus
- New Zealand ruffe, Schedophilus huttoni
- Tasmanian ruffe, Tubbia tasmanica
- Sea ruffe, Any fish of the genus Sebastiscus
- Sea ruffe, Sebasticus marmarotus
