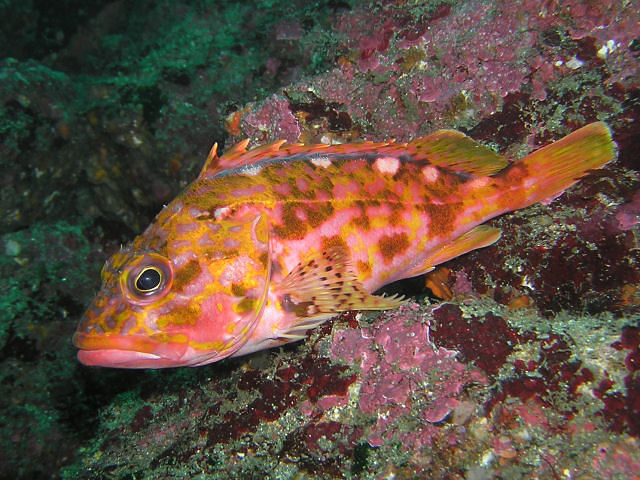

Scientific classification
- Kingdom: Animalia
- Phylum: Chordata
- Class: Actinopterygii
- Order: Perciformes
- Family: Scorpaenidae
- Genus: Sebastiscus
- Species: S. albofasciatus

Binomial name
- Sebastiscus albofasciatus (Lacépède, 1802)

Synonyms
- Holocentrus albofasciatus Lacepède, 1802

= Sebastiscus albofasciatus =

Species of fish

Sebastiscus albofasciatus, the yellowbarred red rockfish or yellowbarred stingfish, is a species of marine ray-finned fish belonging to the subfamily Sebastinae, the rockfishes, part of the family Scorpaenidae. It is found in the northwestern Pacific Ocean.

== Taxonomy ==
Sebastiscus albofasciatus was first formally described as Holocentrus albofasciatus in 1802 by the French naturalist Bernard Germain de Lacépède with the type locality given as China. The specific name albofasciatus means "white banded", Lacépède described the species from an illustration which showed it had a white band at the base of the caudal fin, this is pink and golden in living specimens.

== Description ==
Sebastiscus albofasciatus has 12 spines and 12-13 soft rays in its dorsal fin while the anal fin has 3 spines and 5 soft rays. The pectoral fin has between 16 and 18 soft rays, typically 17. Identified from S, marmoratus in the pectoral fin normally having 17 rays and by a sharp spine on the upper edge of the second introrbital bone. The overall colour is yellowish-red. In live fish there is a pink and gold band at the base of the caudal fin. This species attains a maximum total length of 25 cm (9.8 in).

== Distribution and habitat ==
Sebastiscus albofasciatus is found in the northwestern Pacific Ocean where it occurs in the East China Sea, South China Sea, including Hong Kong, and from southern Japan to eastern Korea. This is a demersal fish found on rocky bottoms, at depths of 30 to 200 m (98 to 656 ft), at greater depths than S. marmoratus.

== Biology ==
Sebastiscus albofasciatus is ovoviviparous.
