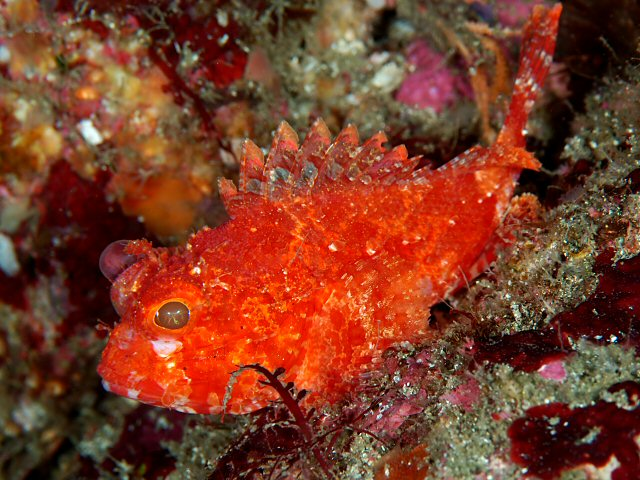

Conservation status
- Least Concern (IUCN 3.1)

Scientific classification
- Kingdom: Animalia
- Phylum: Chordata
- Class: Actinopterygii
- Order: Perciformes
- Family: Scorpaenidae
- Genus: Scorpaena
- Species: S. onaria

Binomial name
- Scorpaena onaria D. S. Jordan & Snyder, 1900

= Western scorpionfish =

Species of fish

The western scorpionfish (Scorpaena onaria), also known as the neglected scorpionfish, is a species of marine ray-finned fish belonging to the family Scorpaenidae, the scorpionfishes. It is found in the western Pacific Ocean.

== Taxonomy ==
The Western scorpionfish was first formally described in 1900 by the American ichthyologists David Starr Jordan and John Otterbein Snyder with the type locality given as Misaki, Japan. The specific name onaria is a latinisation of a Japanese name onari, which means "an Emperor's journey; a fish tabu, or set aside, for the Emperor", Jordan and Snyder did not explain why they gave this epithet to this species.

== Description ==
The Western scorpionfish has 12 sp[ines and 9 soft rays in its dorsal fin with 3 spines and 5 soft rays in its anal fin. The pectoral fins have 16 or 17 fin rays with the highest ray and 9 lowest rays being simple, the remaining 6 rays are branched. It has a body which show moderate com[pression towards the head and gets more compressed towards the tail. The nape and front part of the nody are slightly arched and the body has a depth which is less than the length of the head. There are many small papillae on the head, particularly on the upper head and snout, the head also has many tentacles with a long tentacle on the rear end of the base of the supraocular spine and more tentacles on the orbit. A few small tentacles along the lateral line are the only tentacles on the flanks. It has a large oblique mouth with teeth in the jaws and on the vomer and palatine bone. This species attains a maximum total length of 37.5 cm (14.8 in) and a maximum published weight of 900 g (32 oz). In fresh specimens the colour is variegated, mainly red or reddish yellow, with blotched irregular reddish, yellowish and whitish patches.

== Distribution and habitat ==
The Western scorpionfish is found in the Indo-West Pacific region. It was thought to be restricted to the northwestern Pacific around Japan, Korea and Taiwan but has since been found to occur in the Andaman Sea, Indonesia, north western and eastern Australia, northern New Zealand, the Kermadec Islands and New Caledonia. This demersal fish is found on rocky reefs at depths between 95 and 500 m (312 and 1,640 ft).

== Biology ==
The Western scorpionfish is sexually dimorphic, only the males have a black blotch on the spiny part of the dorsal fin. It is an ambush predator feeding on small fish and crustaceans. It is an oviparous species. There are venom glands at the base of the dorsal fin spines.
