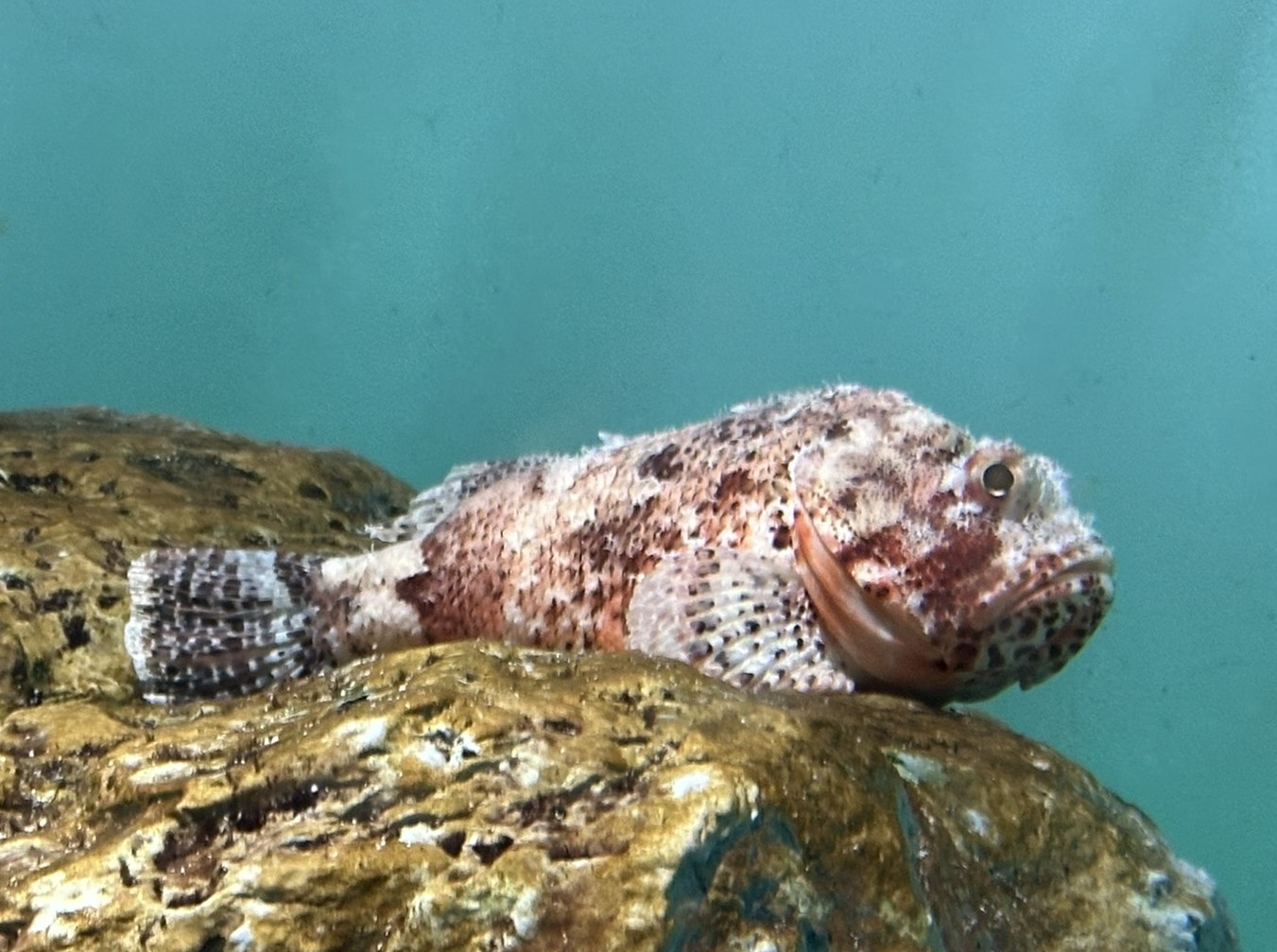
- At Tokyo Sea Life Park

Scientific classification
- Kingdom: Animalia
- Phylum: Chordata
- Class: Actinopterygii
- Division: Teleostei
- Order: Perciformes
- Family: Scorpaenidae
- Genus: Scorpaena
- Species: S. sumptuosa

Binomial name
- Scorpaena sumptuosa Castelnau 1875

= Scorpaena sumptuosa =

Species of fish

Scorpaena sumptuosa, the western red scorpionfish, western red rockcod, western red scorpioncod or western scorpionfish, is a venomous species of marine ray-finned fish belonging to the family Scorpaenidae, the scorpionfishes. It is found in Western Australia.

== Taxonomy ==
Scorpaena sumptuosa was first formally described in 1875 by the French naturalist François-Louis Laporte, comte de Castelnau with the type locality given as Fremantle in Western Australia. The specific name sumptuosa means "magnificent" in Latin, Castelnau did not explain this but it may refer to the deep red colour of this species.

== Description ==
Scorpaena sumptuosa is distinguished from most other species of Scorpaena found in the Indo-Pacific by its maxillary ridge, very deep occipital pit, thickened skin with many pores near the lateral line and covering the spine on the operculum and the presence of two pairs of slender tentacles on the front off the lower jaw. There are 16 fin rays in the pectoral fin. It is closely related to the ghost scorpionfish (Scorpaena gasta) but is larger, has fewer tentacles on the flanks and more variable in colour. This species reaches a maximum total length of 40 cm (16 in). This is a deep-bodied species with an obvious hump on the shoulder. Tentacles cover the body with the effect of disrupting the outline of the body to provide camouflage and the eyes are high on the head. It is a mottled red to brown colour marked with two wide vertical bands on the body, these extend onto the fins.

== Distribution and habitat ==
Scorpaena sumptuosa is endemic to Western Australia where it occurs from the Shark Bay in the north to Albany in the south. It is found on coastal reefs in depths down to 60 m (200 ft).

== Biology ==
Scorpaena sumptuosa is an ambush predator, they lie motionless for lengthy periods, among corals, algae and benthic invertebrates and use their prehensile mouths to suck in prey which comes in range. They are protected by venom bearing spines which can deliver a painful sting.
