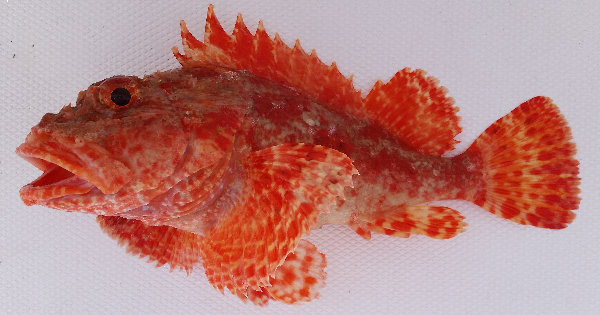
- Loreto, Mexico

Conservation status
- Least Concern (IUCN 3.1)

Scientific classification
- Kingdom: Animalia
- Phylum: Chordata
- Class: Actinopterygii
- Order: Perciformes
- Family: Scorpaenidae
- Genus: Scorpaena
- Species: S. afuerae

Binomial name
- Scorpaena afuerae Hildebrand, 1946

= Scorpaena afuerae =

Species of fish

Scorpaena afuerae, the Peruvian scorpionfish, is a species of marine ray-finned fish belonging to the family Scorpaenidae, the scorpionfishes. This species is found in the eastern Pacific Ocean.

== Taxonomy ==
Scorpaena afuerae was first formally described in 1946 by the American ichthyologist Samuel Frederick Hildebrand with the type locality given as Lobos de Afuera Island off Peru. The type locality is reflected in the specific name.

== Description ==
Scorpaena afuerae has a large, spiny head with deep pits in front of and to the rear of the eyes. The suborbital ridge has 3-4 spines. There are teeth in the centre of the roof of the mouth and at its sides. The preoperculum has 5 spines with the uppermost being the largest, with the spine nest to that also being comparatively strong. There is a row of fringed skin flaps along the edge of the preoperculum. There are 3 spines in a row to the rear of the eye and 2 on the upper margin of the operculum. There are skin flaps over the front of the upper jaw but none on the lower jaw or on the body. The dorsal fin has 12 spines and 9-10 soft raysXII while the anal fin has 3 spines and 5 soft rays. The pectoral has 19-21 finrays with the upper rays being branched and the lower rays are unbranched and thickened. This species has a uniform red colouration with indistinct stripes and spots. It has a maximum published length of 38 cm (15 in), although 18 cm (7.1 in) is more typical.

== Distribution and habitat ==
Scorpaena afuerae is found in the eastern Pacific from Chile to Baja California Sur in Mexico and Cocos Island. It is a demersal species of rocky areas and rubble at depths of 35 to 80 m (115 to 262 ft).

== Biology ==
Scorpaena afuerae rests on the bottom during the day but, become active at night when they feed on small crustaceans, octopus and small fish. It is a rare species.
