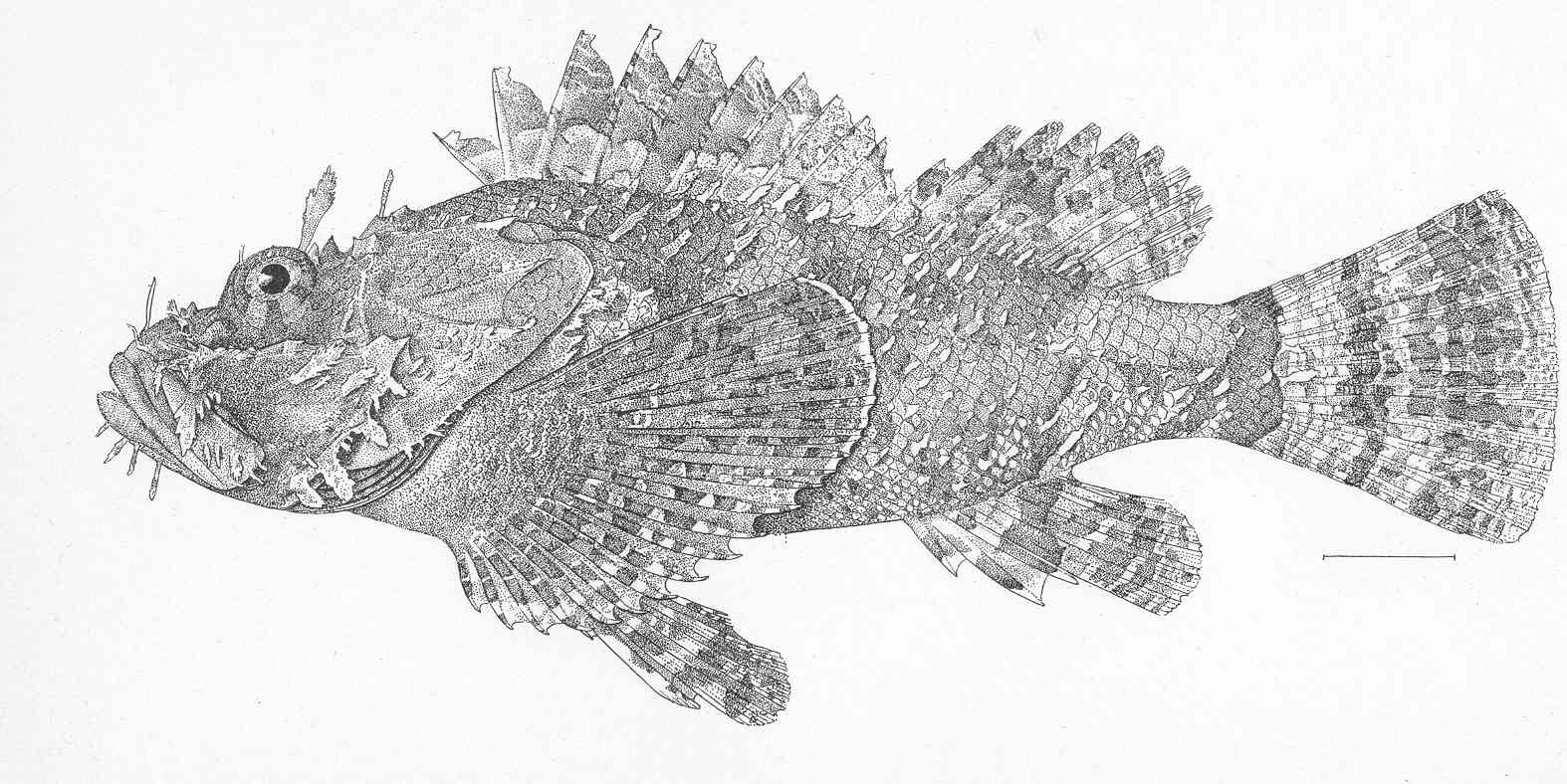

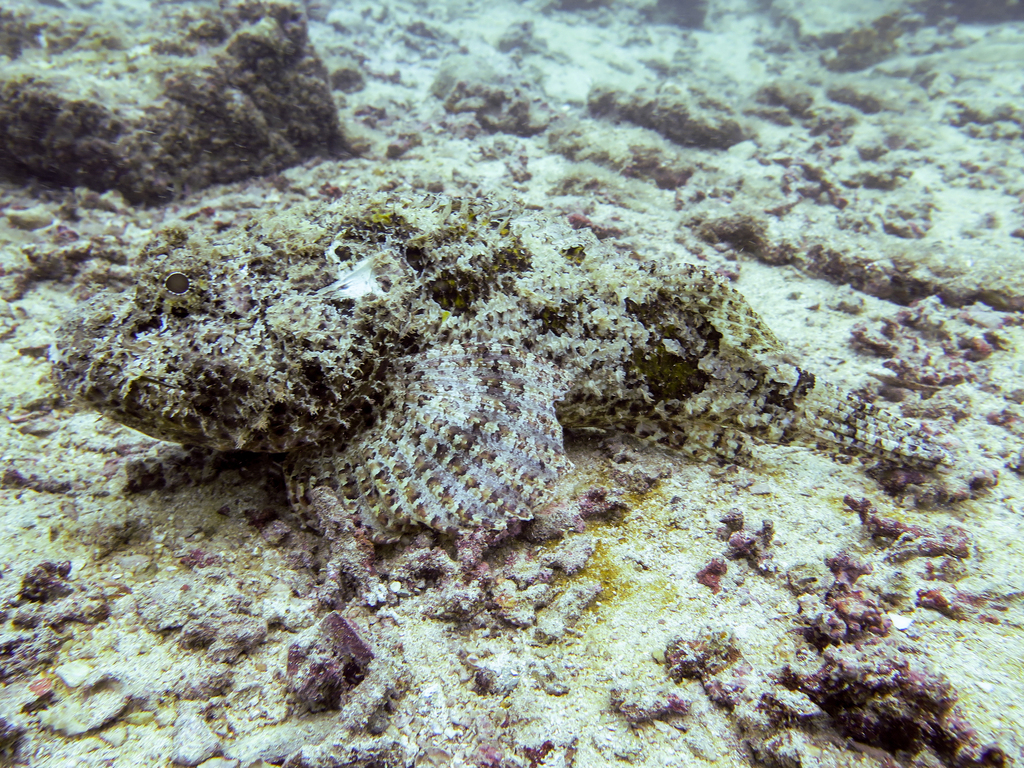

Conservation status
- Least Concern (IUCN 3.1)

Scientific classification
- Kingdom: Animalia
- Phylum: Chordata
- Class: Actinopterygii
- Division: Teleostei
- Order: Perciformes
- Family: Scorpaenidae
- Genus: Scorpaena
- Species: S. mystes

Binomial name
- Scorpaena mystes (Jordan & Starks, 1895)

Synonyms
- Scorpaena plumieri mystes Jordan & Starks, 1895; Holoscorpaena didymogramma Fowler, 1944

= Pacific spotted scorpionfish =

Species of fish

Pacific spotted scorpionfish (Scorpaena mystes), or the stone scorpionfish, is a species of marine ray-finned fish belonging to the family Scorpaenidae, the scorpionfishes. It is found in the eastern Pacific Ocean. It is the largest species in the genus Scorpaena and, like the other species in that genus, it is protected by venomous spines.

== Taxonomy ==
The Pacific spotted scorpionfish was first formally described in 1895 by the American ichthyologists david Starr Jordan and Edwin Chapin Starks with the type locality given as Mazatlán, Sinaloa. Fishes found around the Galápagos Islands and the Revillagigedo Islands show consistent differences from other populations in lacking the white spots on the axil of the pectoral fin and these may be a distinct subspecies. The specific name mystes is a Latin word meaning "initiated one" or "priest", the authors did not explain this allusion not explained but they described it as being "olive brown, almost black" in colour, so may have been referring to the dark vestments of a Roman Catholic priest, in a similar way to Sebastes mystinus, which had been co-described by Jordan in 1881, and where he hinted that this was the allusion.

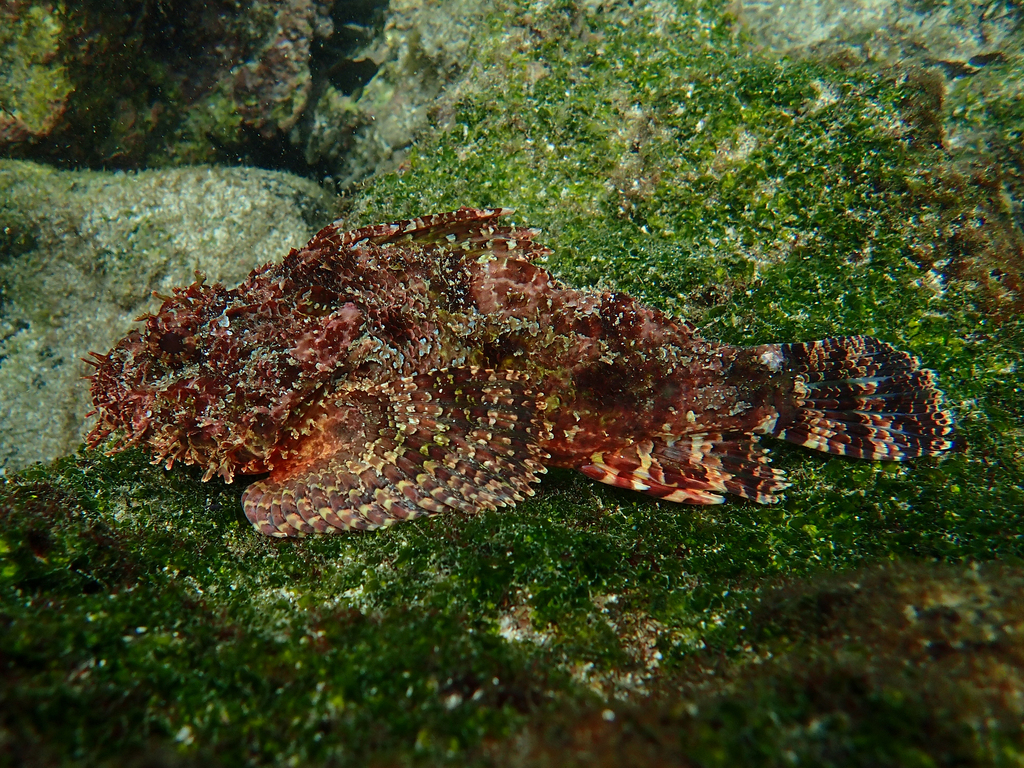
San Cristobal, Galápagos

== Description ==
The Pacific spotted scorpionfish has a very bony head which is armed with a large number of spines and had a deep occipital pit and a smaller pit to the front of the eyes. The head's depth equals its width and there is an extremely large mouth. The suborbital ridge has 3 or 4 spines, There are teeth on the sides of the roof of the mouth. The head and body have a number of skin flaps. There are 12 spines and 9 or 20 soft rays in the dorsal fin while the anal fin has 3 spines and 5 or 6 soft rays,. There are 18-21 fin rays in the pectoral fins with the lower rays being simple and thickened. It has relatively large scales which are smooth on the body and a complete lateral line made up of tubed scales. This species reaches a maximum total length of 45.7 cm (18.0 in), making it the largest species in the genus Scorpaena although a more typical total length is 30.4 cm (12.0 in). It is very variable in its colouration, normally it is a sombre mottled pattern of grey, brown, red, green and black with ark bars on the caudal fin. The axil of the pectoral fin typically has white spots, often arranged in lines. The dorsal fin is usually marked with 1 obvious black spot, although there can be up to four spots. Juveniles have a clear dark bar on the posterior body underneath the soft rayed part of the dorsal fin.

== Distribution and habitat ==
The Pacific spotted scorpionfish is found in the eastern Pacific Ocean. It is found on the western coasts of the Americas from southern California and the Gulf of California south to Chile. It can also be found off the islands of the Galápagos, Revillagigedos, Cocos and Malpelo. This species occurs from the intertidal zone to depths up to 100 m (330 ft) on seaweed-covered reefs and on open area with a substrate of sand and rubble.

== Biology ==
The Pacific spotted scorpionfish is an opportunistic ambush predator, lying camouflaged on the substrate waiting for small fishes to pass in range of its large mouth. It will also feed on crustaceans and cephalopods. The spines of this fish are venomous.
