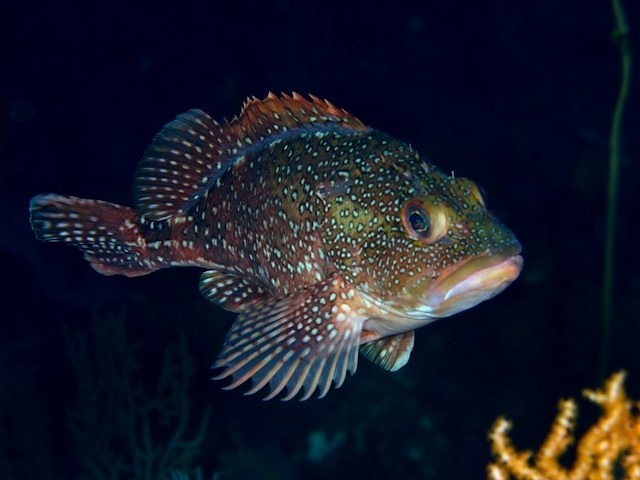

Scientific classification
- Kingdom: Animalia
- Phylum: Chordata
- Class: Actinopterygii
- Order: Perciformes
- Family: Scorpaenidae
- Genus: Sebastiscus
- Species: S. tertius

Binomial name
- Sebastiscus tertius (Barsukov & L. C. Chen, 1978)

Synonyms
- Sebastes tertius Barsukov & Chen, 1978

= Sebastiscus tertius =

Species of fish

Sebastiscus tertius is a species of marine ray-finned fish belonging to the subfamily Sebastinae, the rockfishes, part of the family Scorpaenidae. It is found in the Western Pacific.
