= Scorpaena azorica =

Conservation status
- Data Deficient (IUCN 3.1)

Scientific classification
- Kingdom: Animalia
- Phylum: Chordata
- Class: Actinopterygii
- Order: Perciformes
- Family: Scorpaenidae
- Genus: Scorpaena
- Species: S. azorica

Binomial name
- Scorpaena azorica Eschmeyer, 1969

Species of fish

Scorpaena azorica, the Azores scorpionfish, is a species of marine ray-finned fish belonging to the family Scorpaenidae, the scorpionfishes. This fish occurs in the Northeastern Atlantic region in European waters. This fish is found in demersal and marine environments in subtropical waters, generally on hard bottoms. The maximum recorded length is 9.8 centimetres (3.9 in).

== Description ==
The Azores scorpionfish has a maximum length of about 9.8 cm (4 in). The head is broad with a short snout slightly shorter than the diameter of the eye, and upwardly angled mouth. There is a short tentacle just above the eye and several short spines on the head but no flaps of skin decorating the lower jaw though there are a few small ones on the body. The dorsal fin has twelve spines and nine soft rays and the anal fin has two spines and six soft rays. The pectoral fins are large and oval and have eighteen rays, with rays numbered two to seven being branched. There are about forty-four vertical rows of scales on the body but the head, chest and the base of the pectoral fins are naked. The colour of this fish is generally whitish to pale brown, with darker brown spots and a band of darker pigmentation between the dorsal soft rays and the anal fins. The fins are spotted with brown, the dorsal spines lack a black spot and the caudal fin is unbarred.

== Distribution and habitat ==
The Azores scorpionfish is known only from the coast of Terceira Island in the Azores in the eastern Atlantic Ocean. The holotype was caught on a hard substrate at an unknown depth. Little is known of its behaviour, diet and reproduction.
