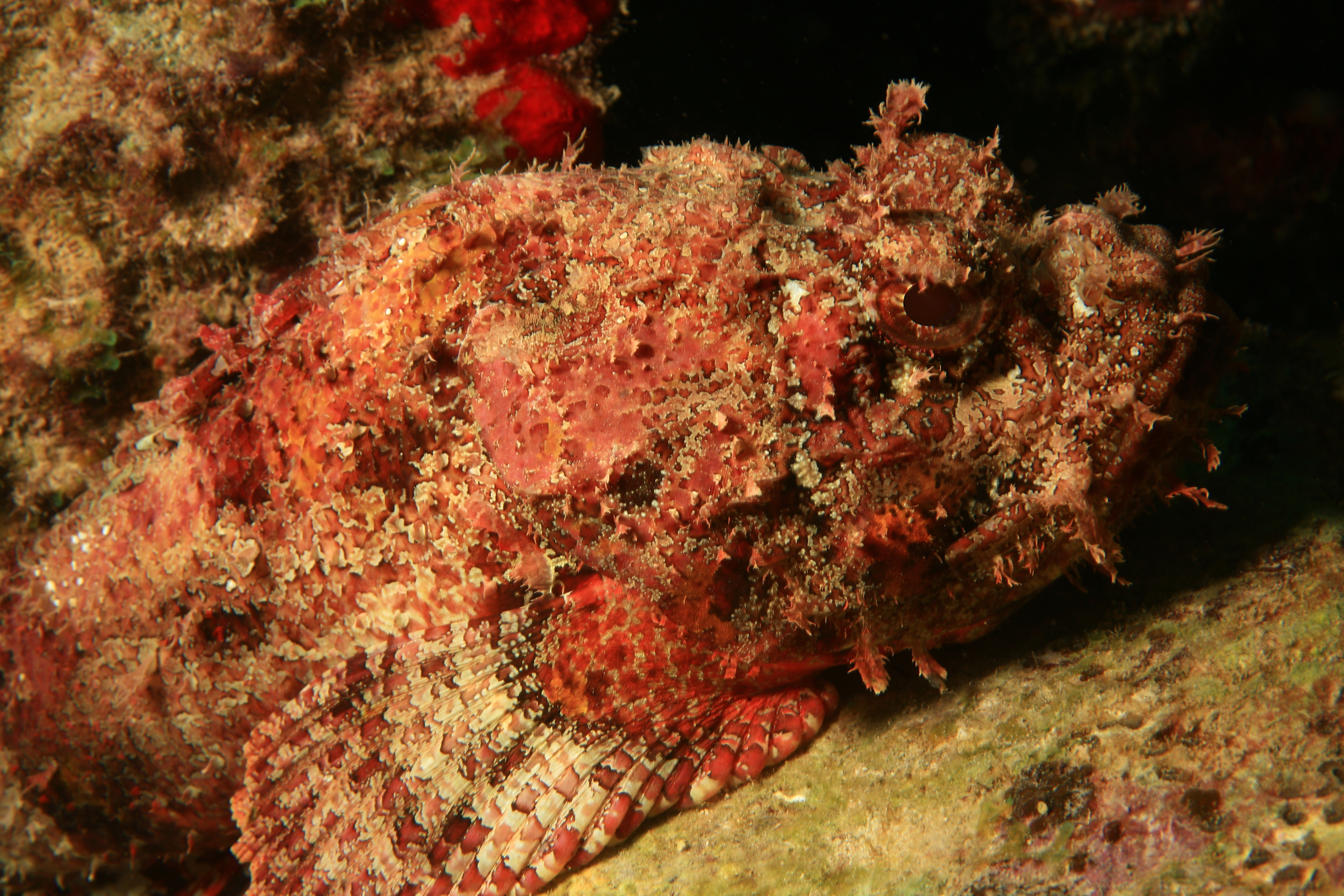

Conservation status
- Least Concern (IUCN 3.1)

Scientific classification
- Kingdom: Animalia
- Phylum: Chordata
- Class: Actinopterygii
- Order: Perciformes
- Family: Scorpaenidae
- Genus: Scorpaena
- Species: S. plumieri

Binomial name
- Scorpaena plumieri Bloch, 1789

Synonyms
- Scorpaena bufo Cuvier, 1829; Scorpaena scrofina Valenciennes, 1833; Scorpaena rascacio Poey, 1860; Scorpaena albofasciata Metzelaar, 1919; Scorpaena colonensis Meek & Hildebrand, 1928

= Scorpaena plumieri =

Species of fish

Scorpaena plumieri, the spotted scorpionfish, is a species of venomous marine ray-finned fish belonging to the family Scorpaenidae, the scorpionfishes. It is found in the Atlantic Ocean.

== Taxonomy ==
Scorpaena plumieri was first formally described in 1789 by the German physician and naturalist Marcus Elieser Bloch with the type locality given as Martinique. The specific name honors Charles Plumier, a Franciscan friar and naturalist, who discovered this fish at Martinique. Bloch based his description on Plumier's drawing of it.

== Description ==
It has a robust body, with a dorsal fin with 12 spines, nine soft rays, and the pectoral fin with 18–21 fin rays. Venom glands are associated with dorsal fin spines to defend against predators. It has a suborbital crest formed by infraorbital bones two and three, with one or two spines each. Under the eyes, they have fleshy plumes, known as "cirrae", with flaps of skin around the chin and head. They have wide and fan-shaped pectoral fins, the dorsal fin is continuous and notched, while the caudal fin is truncated. The maxilla reaches beyond the eyes and the mouth is terminal. It has a well developed occipital pit. It is the largest scorpion fish in the Atlantic and Caribbean oceans; the largest reported size was 45 centimetres (18 in) long, although on average, this species grows from 18 to 36 centimetres (7.1 to 14.2 in), and can weigh 1.55 kilograms (3.4 lb).

The color of this species varies from brown to black with a light background, the areas before the caudal fin are abruptly paler. The head has dark spots, the ventral surface is orange / red. Its fins have dark bands and spots, with a light background, but most often with green spots. In the middle and near the end, the tail fin has dark bars. Inside the fins of the chest, it is stained white. When it feels threatened, the pectoral fins extend and display a bright color.

== Distribution and habitat ==
It inhabits the western Atlantic Ocean, from Bermuda to Massachusetts, and from the northern Gulf of Mexico to southern Brazil. It is also found in the Eastern Atlantic Ocean, around Ascension Island and St. Helena. They inhabit shallow coral reefs and rocky areas, moderately common from 5–55 metres (16–180 ft) deep. It remains motionless, on the lower substrate, waiting for prey to attack.

== Diet ==
Like other scorpion fish, these animals do not actively hunt, as they are ambush predators, camouflaging themselves to approach prey. It uses its large mouth as a vacuum and sucks its prey quickly, preys of this species include fishes and crustaceans.

Scorpionfish use a tactic of kinematic timing which is a type of technique used to fixate on prey and their general position based on the hinter's body. Scorpionfish will only attack when a prey's position would be likely to succumb to an attack. In addition to their ambush predation, kinematic timing allows scorpionfish to wait for the best possible prey option.

== Reproduction ==
While the reproduction of these animals is not well known, it is known that they are oviparous, with the female producing transparent or greenish eggs.

== Predators ==
Major predators of this species include the schoolmaster (Lutjanus apodus) and mutton snappers (Lutjanus analis).

== Venom ==
The spines located on the back of the fish inject venom, so these animals can pose a danger to humans. The venom has hemorrhagic, hemolytic and proteolytic activities and contains cardiotoxins, which cause a drop in blood pressure, and heart and respiratory rate. Symptoms include excruciating pain at the site, followed by edema, erythema and occasionally skin necrosis. Other symptoms include adenopathy, nausea, vomiting, agitation, malaise, sweating, tachycardia, arrhythmias, difficulty breathing and severe hypotension. The main treatment for pain is to immerse the affected limb in hot water (45–50 °C) until the pain is relieved. The LD_{50} for the venom of this species is 0.28 mg / kg.
