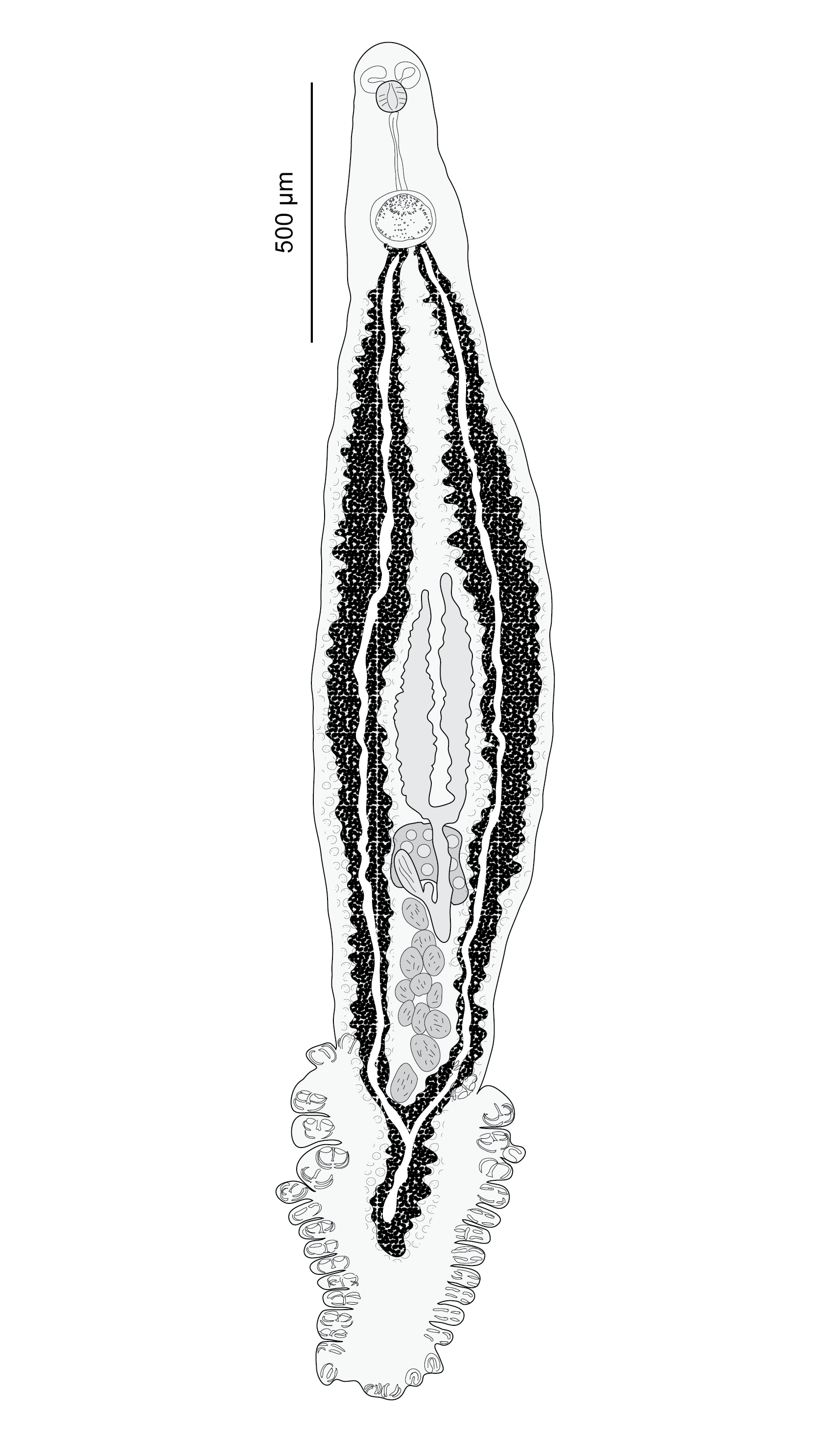
- Microcotyle algeriensis, holotype

Scientific classification
- Kingdom: Animalia
- Phylum: Platyhelminthes
- Class: Monogenea
- Order: Mazocraeidea
- Family: Microcotylidae
- Genus: Microcotyle
- Species: M. algeriensis

Binomial name
- Microcotyle algeriensis Ayadi, Gey, Justine & Tazerouti, 2017

= Microcotyle algeriensis =

Species of worms

Microcotyle algeriensis is a species of monogenean, parasitic on the gills of a marine fish. It belongs to the family Microcotylidae.

== Systematics ==
Microcotyle algeriensis was described Ayadi et al., in 2017, from the gills of the small red scorpionfish Scorpaena notata (Scorpaenidae) collected at Bouharoune off the Algerian coast. In the same paper, Ayadi et al., (2017) collected another species of Microcotyle from the gills of Helicolenus dactylopterus, that differs from M. algeriensis by morphology and COI sequence; and from M. sebastis by COI sequence. However, the authors refrained from describing Microcotyle sp. from Helicolenus dactylopterus as new because M. sebastis (originally described from scorpaeniform fishes off Japan) has been recorded in various hosts in the North and South Pacific, Atlantic and Mediterranean (for the latter, in the same host, H. dactylopterus). Thus, Ayadi et al., (2017) suggested that a correct specific identification of Microcotyle spp from scorpaeniform fishes must relay on a detailed morphological and molecular study of specimens from different locations and hosts.

== Description ==
Microcotyle algeriensis has the general morphology of all species of Microcotyle, with a symmetrical elongate body, comprising an anterior part which contains most organs and a posterior part called the haptor. The haptor is subsymmetrical and continuous with body, and bears 20–39 clamps, arranged as two subequal lateral rows, one on each side. The clamps of the haptor attach the animal to the gill of the fish. There are also two septate oval buccal suckers at the anterior extremity. The digestive organs include an anterior, terminal mouth, a globular pharynx, a long thin oesophagus without lateral diverticula and a posterior intestine that bifurcates at level of genital atrium in two lateral branches not united posteriorly, one branche ends at level of the testes while the other extends into the haptor. Each adult contains male and female reproductive organs. The reproductive organs include an anterior genital atrium, armed with numerous conical spines, arranged as one main anterior group and two postero-lateral smaller groups called (“pockets” of Mamaev), a medio-dorsal vagina located posterior to genital atrium, a single tubular ovary consisting of a convoluted tube and 9–20 intercaecal post-ovarian testes in posterior half of body proper. The eggs are fusiform with long filaments at both ends.

== Etymology ==
The species name refers to Algeria, the type-locality of the species.

== Diagnosis ==
Microcotyle algeriensis differs from Microcotyle sp. from Helicolenus dactylopterus by the number of clamps, the number of spines in the genital atrium, hosts, and COI divergence between the two. Microcotyle algeriensis is also distinguished different from M. sebastis from the Pacific by the COI divergence and host.

== Molecular informations ==
Three sequences of the mitochondrial cytochrome oxidase 1 gene of Microcotyle algeriensis (and the corresponding host fish) were published by Ayadi et al., (2017). In the same paper, the authors provided two sequences of Microcotyle sp. along with the corresponding host Helicolenus dactylopterus.

== Hosts and localities ==
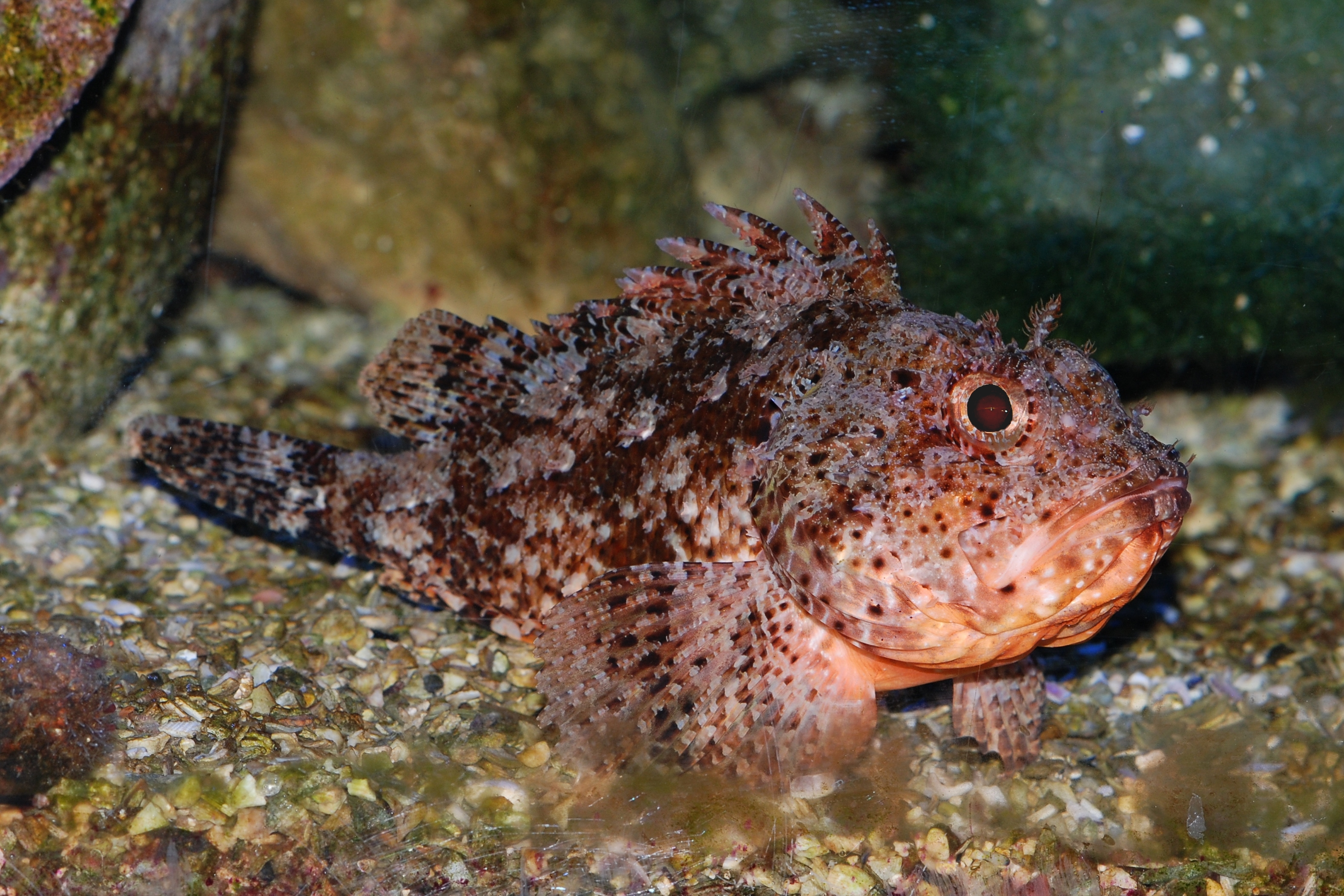
Scorpaena notata is the type host of Microcotyle algeriensis

The type-host is the small red scorpionfish Scorpaena notata, the identification of the host was confirmed by molecular barcoding of the COI gene. The type-locality is off Algeria.
