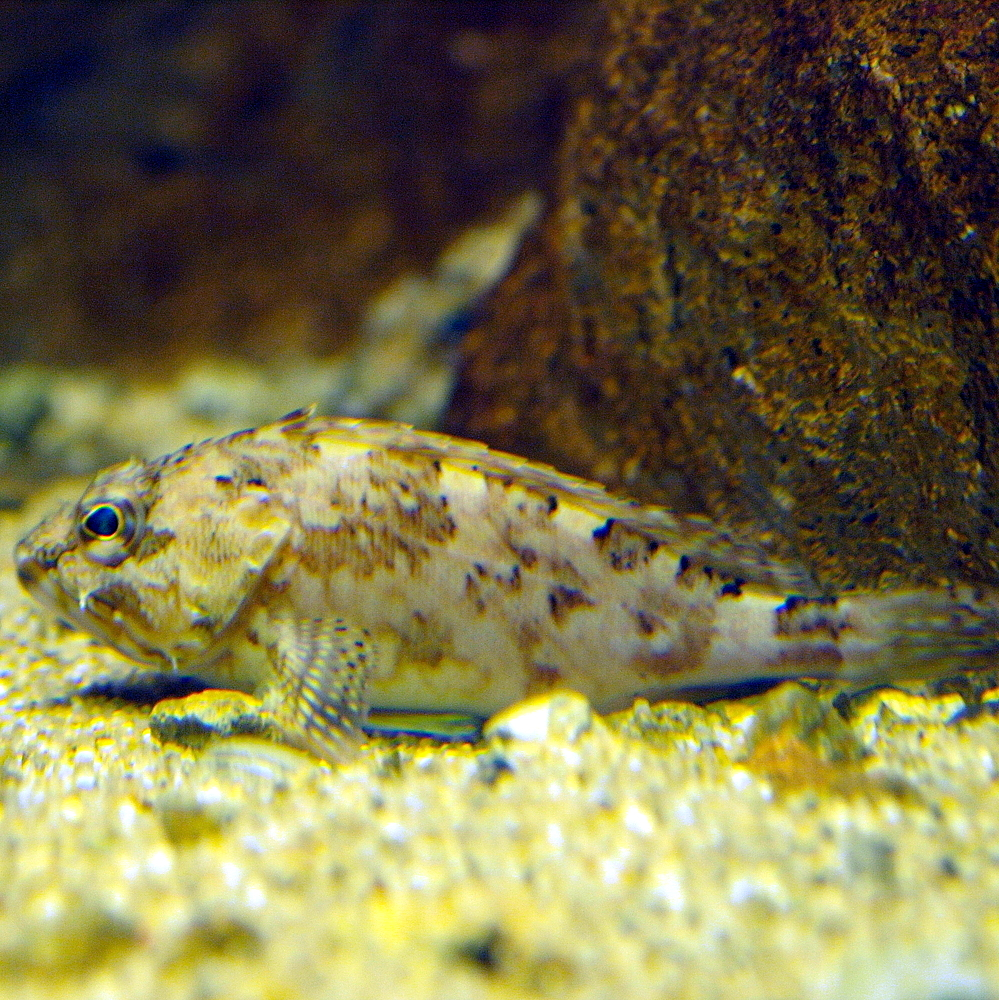
- False kelpfish, Sebastiscus marmoratus

Scientific classification
- Kingdom: Animalia
- Phylum: Chordata
- Class: Actinopterygii
- Order: Perciformes
- Suborder: Scorpaenoidei
- Family: Scorpaenidae
- Subfamily: Sebastinae
- Genus: Sebastiscus; D. S. Jordan & Starks, 1904

Type species
- Sebastes marmoratus Cuvier, 1829

= Sebastiscus =

Genus of fishes

Sebastiscus is a genus of marine ray-finned fish belonging to the subfamily Sebastinae part of the family Scorpaenidae. These fishes are native to the western Pacific Ocean. They are collectively called sea ruffes and resemble the rockfishes in the genus Sebastes, but are usually smaller and have a different pattern.

== Taxonomy ==
Sebastiscus was first formally described as a subgenus of Sebastes by David Starr Jordan and Edwin Chapin Starks in 1904 with Sebastes marmoratus, which had been described by Georges Cuvier in 1829, as its type species. It was regarded as a subgenus up to 1984 when it was proposed as a valid genus, albeit within the same tribe Sebastini as the speciose genus Sebastes, which is one of the tribes of the subfamily Sebastinae within the family Scorpaenidae and the order Scorpaeniformes. but other authorities place it in the Perciformes in the suborder Scorpaenoidei.

== Species ==
There are currently four recognized species in this genus:

Image	Scientific name	Common name	Distribution
	Sebastiscus albofasciatus (Lacépède, 1802)		Western Pacific off the coast of China, Japan, and Korea
	Sebastiscus marmoratus (G. Cuvier, 1829)	False kelpfish, Japanese sea ruffe	Western Pacific from southern Japan to the Philippines.
	Sebastiscus tertius (Barsukov & L. C. Chen, 1978)		Western Pacific
	Sebastiscus vibrantus Morishita, Kawai & Motomura, 2018		Western Pacific

== Characteristics ==
Sebastiscus was described by Jordan and Starks as being similar to the subgenus Sebastodes of the genus Sebastes, the Pacific rockfishes were considered to be separate from the Atlantic redfishes which bore the generic name Sebastes. They also stated that these fishes bore a close resemblance to the fishes in the subgenus Pteropodus but differed in the possession of 12 dorsal fin spines and in the vertebrae count. These characteristics were thought to be similar to the genus Scorpaena. Sebastiscus was differentiated from Helicolenus by having a well developed swim bladder.

== Distribution and habitat ==
Sebasticus species are found in the western Pacific Ocean from Japan and Korea south to the Philippines. Extralimital records of S. marmoratus in Australia and Norway are thought to probably be a result of fish being transported to these locations in the ballast water of ships. They are shallow water coastal species.
