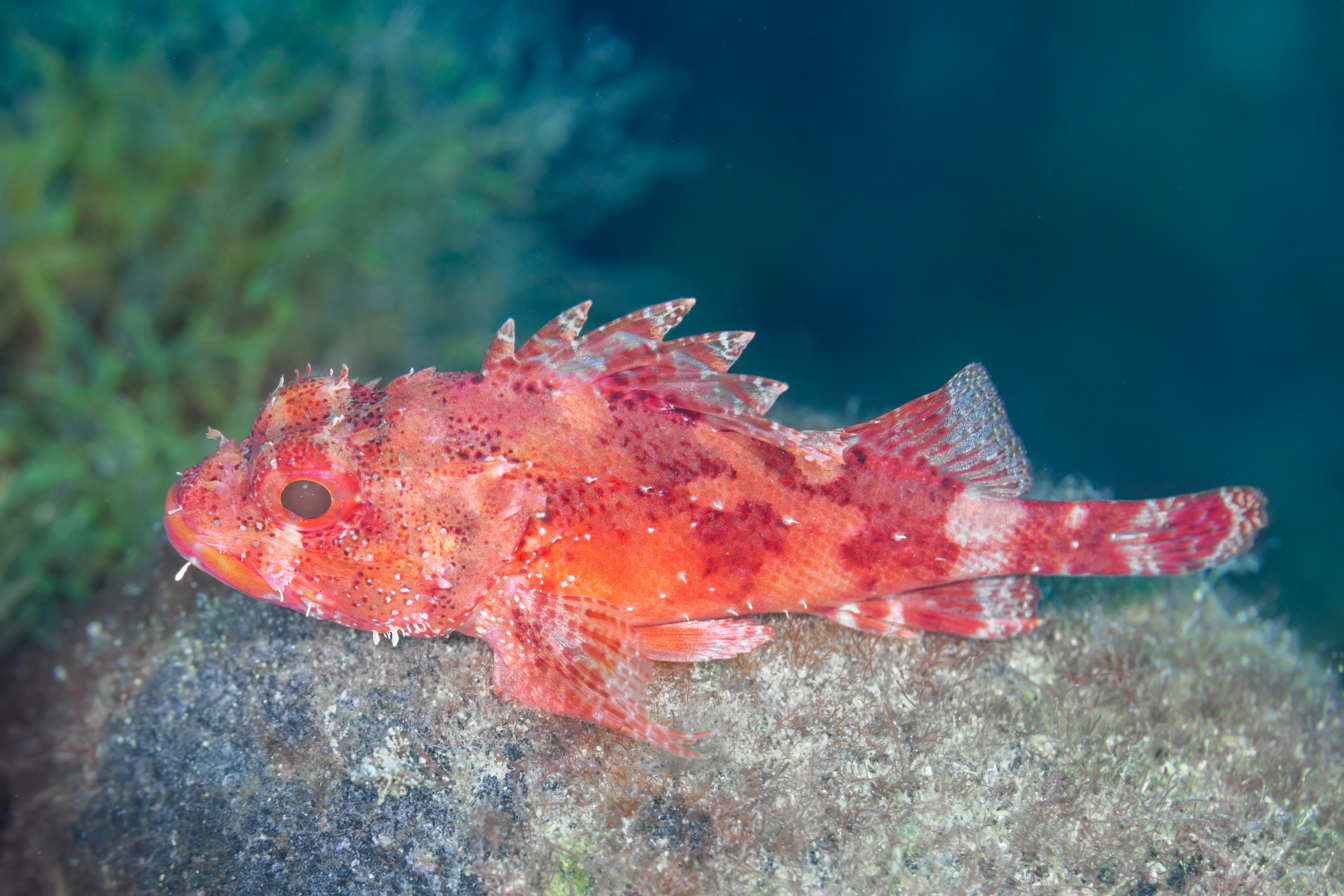

Conservation status
- Least Concern (IUCN 3.1)

Scientific classification
- Kingdom: Animalia
- Phylum: Chordata
- Class: Actinopterygii
- Division: Teleostei
- Order: Perciformes
- Family: Scorpaenidae
- Genus: Scorpaena
- Species: S. notata

Binomial name
- Scorpaena notata Rafinesque, 1810

Synonyms
- Scorpaena afimbria Slastenenko, 1935; Scorpaena scrofa afimbria Slastenenko, 1935; Scorpaena teneriffea Jordan & Gunn, 1898; Scorpaena ustulata Lowe, 1841

= Small red scorpionfish =

Species of fish

Small red scorpionfish (Scorpaena notata) is a venomous scorpionfish, common in marine subtropical waters. It is widespread in the Eastern Atlantic from the Bay of Biscay to Senegal, Madeira, Azores and the Canary Islands, including the Mediterranean (rare in northern Adriatic) and the Black Sea.

== Taxonomy ==
The small red scorpionfish was first formally described in 1810 by the French polymath Constantine Samuel Rafinesque with the type locality given as Sicily. The specific name notata means "marked", an allusion to the large black spot on the spiny part of the dorsal fin.

== Description ==
The small red scorpionfish has a maximum length of about 20 cm (8 in) but a more normal adult length is around 15 cm (6 in). The head is broad with a short snout and upwardly angled mouth. There is a short tentacle just above the eye and various other shorter tentacles, spines and flaps of skin decorating the head. The dorsal fin has twelve spines and nine soft rays and the anal fin has two spines and six soft rays. The pectoral fins are large and oval and have seventeen to nineteen rays. There are about forty-four vertical rows of scales on the body but the head, chest and the base of the pectoral fins are naked. The colour of this fish is generally reddish-brown and there is a large, semicircular pigmented spot between the sixth and tenth dorsal spines. The fins are spotted with brown and the caudal fin is unbarred.

== Distribution and habitat ==
The small red scorpionfish is native to the subtropical eastern Atlantic Ocean, the Mediterranean Sea and the Black Sea. Its range extends southwards from the Bay of Biscay to Madeira, the Azores, the Canary Islands and the northwestern coast of Africa as far south as Senegal. It is found throughout the Mediterranean Sea but is uncommon in the Adriatic Sea. It is present in the Black Sea as the subspecies Scorpaena notata afimbria. It is usually a littoral species but also occurs in deeper water down to a depth of about 700 m (2,300 ft).

== Biology ==
The small red scorpionfish is a benthic species and is usually found resting on rocks. It is usually solitary, and it feeds on small fishes, crustaceans and other bottom-dwelling invertebrates. Little is known about its reproduction but it probably spawns in May.

== Parasites ==
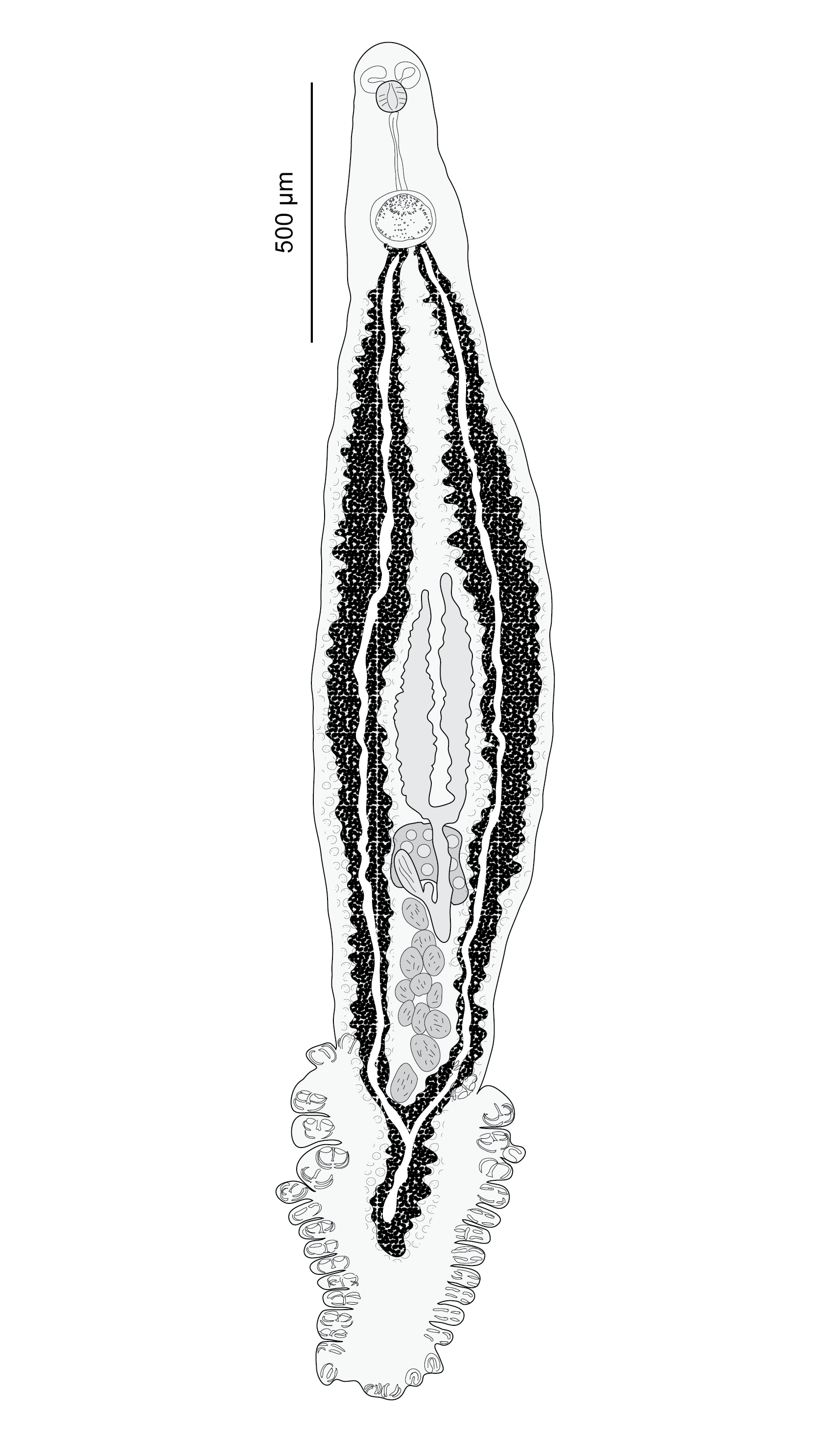
Microcotyle algeriensis, a parasite of the small red scorpionfish

The small red scorpionfish has several parasites. Among them, the monogenean Microcotyle algeriensis was recently (2017) discovered on the gills of fish collected off Algeria.
