= Scorpaena cocosensis =

Scientific classification
- Kingdom: Animalia
- Phylum: Chordata
- Class: Actinopterygii
- Order: Perciformes
- Family: Scorpaenidae
- Genus: Scorpaena
- Species: S. cocosensis

Binomial name
- Scorpaena cocosensis Motomura, 2004

Species of fish

Scorpaena cocosensis, the Cocos scorpionfish, is a species of marine ray-finned fish belonging to the family Scorpaenidae, the scorpionfishes. It is found in the eastern Pacific Ocean.

== Taxonomy ==
Scorpaena cocosensis was first formally described in 2004 by the Japanese ichthyologist Hiroyuki Motomura with the type locality given as off Nuez Island near Cocos Island in Costa Rica. The specific name refers to Cocos Island.

== Description ==
Scorpaena cocosensis is a small species of scorpionfish and reaches a maximum published total length of 11.8 cm (4.6 in). There are 12 spines and 8 soft rays in the dorsal fin while the anal fin has 3 spines and 5 soft rays. The chest is covered with well exposed scales. The pectoral fin has 22 fin rays. There are strong ridges in the intraorbital space which start immediately to the rear of the nasal spine and split at both ends when viewed from above. The occipital pit is shallow and is bordered by a bony ridge to its front. They have a large head and large eyes. The background colour is red mottled with white blotching. The operculum has dark red spots and the pectoral fin is red with a dusky tip. There a retro diagonal red bars on the soft rayed part of the dorsal fin and 2 dark red bars on the caudal fin.

== Distribution and habitat ==
Scorpaena cocosensis is found in the tropical eastern Pacific Ocean around Cocos Island in Costa Rica and the Galápagos Islands in Ecuador. This is a demersal fish occurring at depths between 56 and 92 m (184 and 302 ft), in areas where the seabed is covered in coral and rock rubble.
