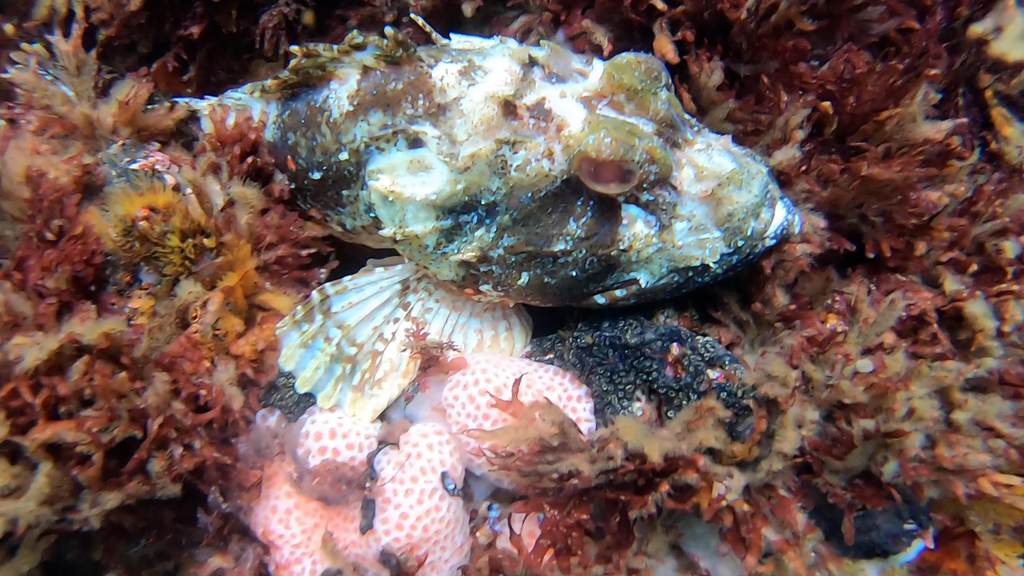

Conservation status
- Least Concern (IUCN 3.1)

Scientific classification
- Kingdom: Animalia
- Phylum: Chordata
- Class: Actinopterygii
- Order: Perciformes
- Family: Scorpaenidae
- Genus: Scorpaena
- Species: S. cardinalis

Binomial name
- Scorpaena cardinalis Solander & J. Richardson, 1842

Synonyms
- Ruboralga cardinalis (Solander & Richardson, 1842); Scorpaena plebeia Solander, 1842; Scorpaena cookii Günther, 1874; Ruboralga cookii (Günther, 1874)

= Scorpaena cardinalis =

Species of fish

Scorpaena cardinalis, the eastern red scorpionfish, grandfather hapuku, cardinal scorpionfish, Cook's scorpionfish, Cook's rockcod, Kermadec scorpionfish, Northern scorpionfish, red scorpion fish, red scorpion-cod or Sandy-bay cod, is a species of marine ray-finned fish belonging to the family Scorpaenidae, the scorpionfishes. It is found in the southwestern Pacific Ocean.

== Taxonomy ==
Scorpaena cardinalis was first formally described in 1842 by the Swedish naturalist Daniel Solander and the Scottish naval surgeon, naturalist and Arctic explorer Sir John Richardson in Richardson's Contributions to the ichthyology of Australia published in the Annals and Magazine of Natural History. The type locality was given as White Island, New Zealand, where the type was collected by Solander in 1769. This species has been placed in the genus Ruboralga, in 2011 this taxon was redefined as a species complex with Ruboralga confirmed as a junior synonym of Scorpaena, S. cardinalis was confirmed as a valid species with S. jacksoniensis, which had been the type species of Ruboralga, as another valid species along with S. orgila while the taxa S. cookii and S. plebeia were confirmed as synonyms of S. cardinalis. The specific name cardinalis means "red".

== Description ==
Scorpaena cardinalis has a laterally compressed body, more so posteriorly. There are many tentacles attached to the head. The fish has a dorsal fin with 12 toxic spines and 9 soft rays. The anal fin has 3 spines and 5 soft rays. The pelvic fin has 1 spine and 5 soft rays. The caudal fin has 11 branched rays. The mouth is large and slightly oblique, and the teeth are present on vomer and palatines. The underside of the jaw is smooth with very little bumps and ridges. This species can vary in coloration and pattern. Usually they are pinkish-red or reddish- orange with brown spots usually present. Posteriorly, they get darker. These mottled colors do not extend to their ventral side, due to being bottom dwelling fish. It attains a maximum total length of 18 cm (7.1 in).

== Distribution and habitat ==
Scorpaena cardinalis is found in the temperate waters of the southwestern Pacific Ocean. In New Zealand it is found from the Bay of Plenty northwards, the Kermadec Islands, Lord Howe Island, Middleton & Elizabeth Reefs and Norfolk Island but it is replaced on the mainland coast of Australia by S. jacksoniensis. They use cryptic coloration in order to avoid predation, and can vary in color. It usually has skin flaps on the head and dorsal side in order to blend in with corals and the rocky areas in which they dwell. Present in coral reefs and rockpools, they are bottom dwellers, usually only moving when disturbed.

== Biology ==
Scorpaena cardinalis is a well-camouflaged ambush predator feeding nocturnally. The bulk of its diet is made up of small fishes, although it also eats crabs, shrimps, and octopus.
