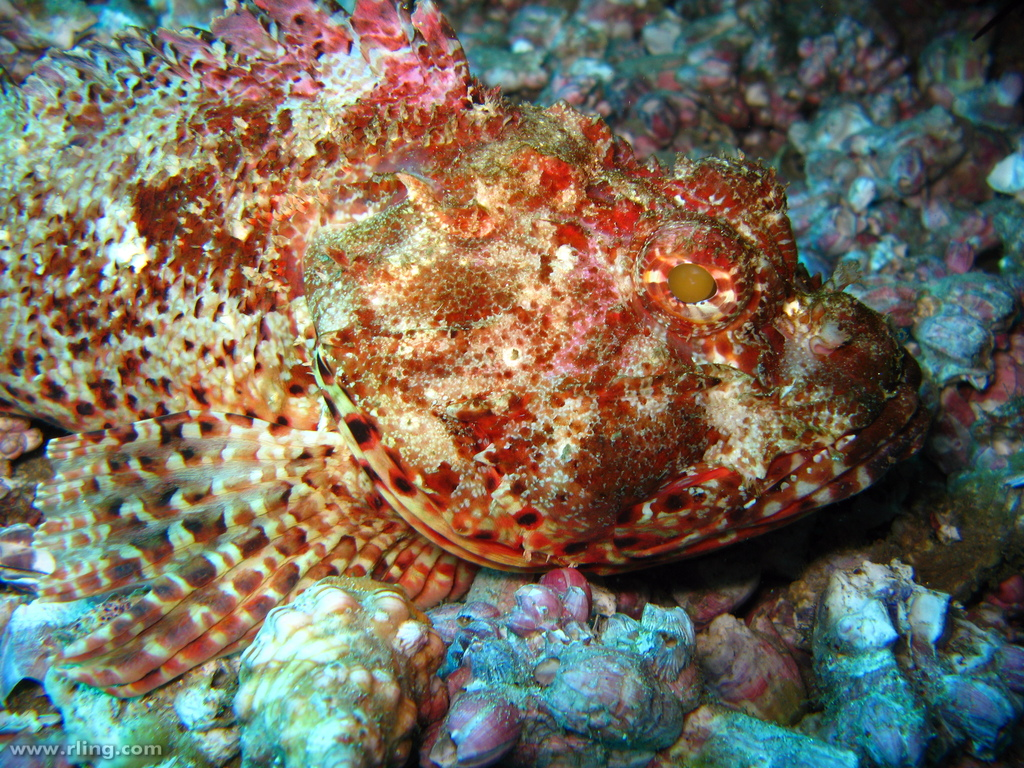

Scientific classification
- Kingdom: Animalia
- Phylum: Chordata
- Class: Actinopterygii
- Order: Perciformes
- Family: Scorpaenidae
- Genus: Scorpaena
- Species: S. jacksoniensis

Binomial name
- Scorpaena jacksoniensis Steindachner, 1866

Synonyms
- Ruboralga jacksoniensis (Steindachner, 1866)

= Scorpaena jacksoniensis =

Species of fish

Scorpaena jacksoniensis, the Eastern red scorpionfish, Billy Bougain, cardinal scorpionfish, coral cod, coral perch, Eastern red scorpioncod, fire cod, Northern scorpionfish, ocean perch, prickly heat, red rockcod or red scorpion-cod, is a species of marine ray-finned fish belonging to the family Scorpaenidae, the scorpionfishes. It is found in the south western Pacific Ocean.

== Taxonomy ==
Scorpaena jacksoniensis was first formally described in 1866 by the Austrian ichthyologist Franz Steindachner with the type locality given as Port Jackson in New South Wales. This species has been considered to be the type species of the genus Ruboralga, in 2011 this taxon was redefined as a species complex with Ruboralga confirmed as a junior synonym of Scorpaena, S. jacksoniensis was confirmed as a separate species from S. cardinalis which is confined to northern New Zealand and some islands in the Tasman Sea. The other valid species in the complex is S. orgila of Easter Island. The specific name jacksonensis means "from Jackson", a reference to the type locality.

== Description ==
Scorpaena jacksoniensis has 12 spines and 9 soft rays in its dorsal fin, the 4th (occasionally the 3rd) spine being the longest, There are 16–18, normally 17, fin rays in the pectoral fin. The pelvic fin base is covered in embedded cycloid scales and these are also found on the rear of the underside which has a thick skin. The lateral lacrimal spine has 2, occasionally 3, points; the forward lacrimal spine has, 1 or 2, small spiny points on its rear edge and the rear lacrimal spine has a single point and us directed forwards and downwards in juveniles and young with a standard length of less than 100 mm (3.9 in) but it is pointed either straight down or diagonally rearwards in adults. There is a ridge in the middle of the interorbital space which has no spines but there is an occipital pit and a supplementary spine on the preoperculum. The pterotic spine is normally simple in young but in large adults, with a standard length greater than 28 cm (11 in) it may have 2 or more points. The gap separating the upper and lower opercular spines is clothed in thick skin which has sensory pores and canals. There are many skin flaps and tentacles on front part of the upper body. The colour of this species is frequently bright red but its colouration is extremely variable, it can be light grey to bright red marked with blotches. There are normally small dark spots on the chest. The juveniles can show a white to purplish blotch across the nape. Males have a large black spot on the soft-rayed part of the dorsal fin. This species has reached a maximum length of 40 cm (16 in)>

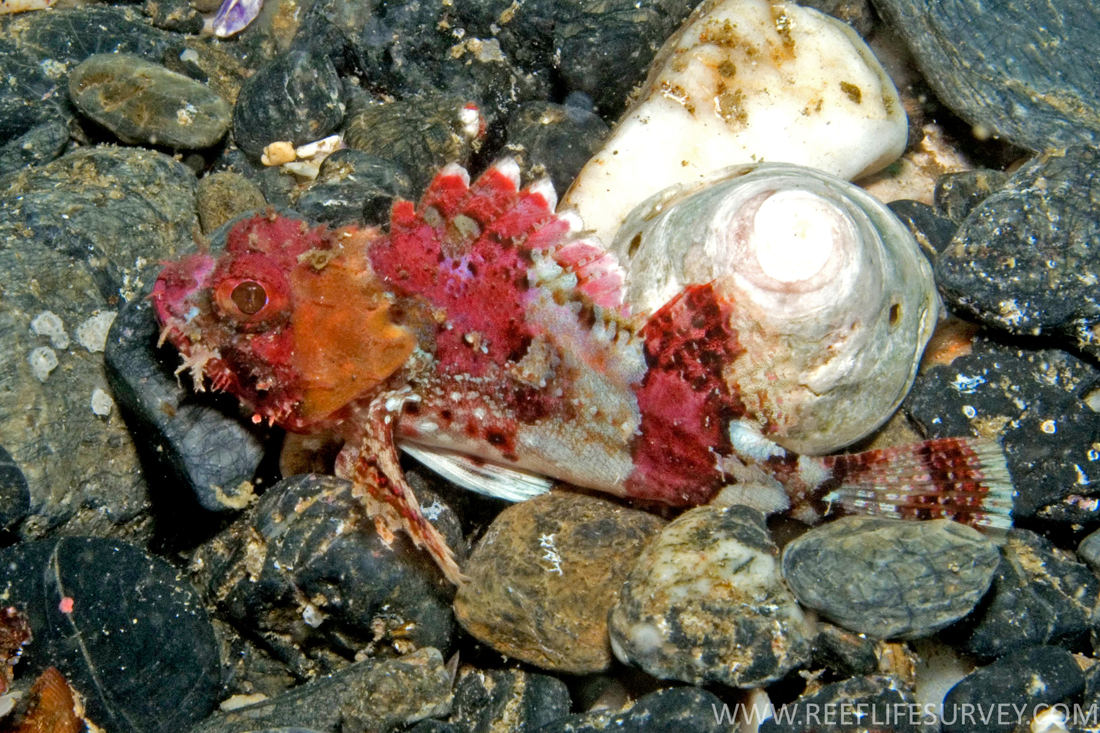
Juvenile

== Distribution and habitat ==
Scorpaena jacksoniensis is endemic to the temperate seas of southeastern Australia. It definitely occurs as far north as Caloundra in Queensland south to the Beware Reef in Victoria. It may also occur as far west as Western Port, Victoria, however the Victorian records are based on a few old specimens and the southern limit of this species appears to be Jervis Bay in New South Wales. This species occurs in shallow estuaries and on rocky coastal to deep, offshore reefs. It is a benthic species which is camouflaged among rocks, corals and algae at depths between 1 and 73 m (3 ft 3 in and 239 ft 6 in).

== Biology ==
Scorpaena jacksonensis is an ambush predator that uses its excellent camouflage to hide on the substrate, lying motionless and waiting for its prey of crustaceans and fishes to come within reach of its large mouth to be swallowed whole. They have separate sexes with external fertilisation, breeding in the summer and autumn. The females extrude hollow, two-lobed, buoyant gelatinous masses to protect their eggs. This is a slow growing species which can take 5 years to reach a length of 22 cm (8.7 in) and 10 years to reach 26 cm (10 in) and the oldest fish known was 33 years old. The dorsal spines in the dorsal fin are venomous and envenomation is extremely painful for people.

== Fisheries ==
Scorpaena jacksoniensis has palatable flesh and is of minor interest to commercial line and recreational fisheries.
