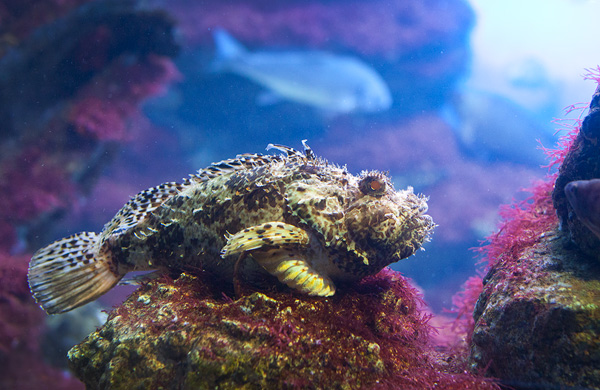

Conservation status
- Least Concern (IUCN 3.1)

Scientific classification
- Kingdom: Animalia
- Phylum: Chordata
- Class: Actinopterygii
- Division: Teleostei
- Order: Perciformes
- Family: Scorpaenidae
- Genus: Scorpaena
- Species: S. porcus

Binomial name
- Scorpaena porcus Linnaeus, 1758

Synonyms
- Scorpaena erythraea Cuvier, 1829; Scorpaena klausewitzi Frøiland, 1972

= Black scorpionfish =

Species of fish

The black scorpionfish (Scorpaena porcus), also known as the European scorpionfish or small-scaled scorpionfish, is a venomous scorpionfish, common in marine subtropical waters. It is widespread in the eastern Atlantic Ocean from the British Isles to the Azores and Canary Islands, near the coasts of Morocco, and in the Mediterranean Sea and the Black Sea.

== Taxonomy ==
The black scorpionfish was first formally described in 1758 by Carl Linnaeus in the 10th edition of his Systema Naturae in which he gave the type localities as the Mediterranean Sea and the Atlantic Ocean. Linnaeus also described the genus Scorpaena and in 1876 the Dutch ichthyologist Pieter Bleeker designated S. porcus as the type species of the genus Scorpaena. The specific name porcus means "pig", an allusion which Linnaeus did not explain. However, it may reference the belief, originating with Athenaeus, who said that he observed this species eating algae or weed and this was mistranslated in the Renaissance as "mud".

== Description ==
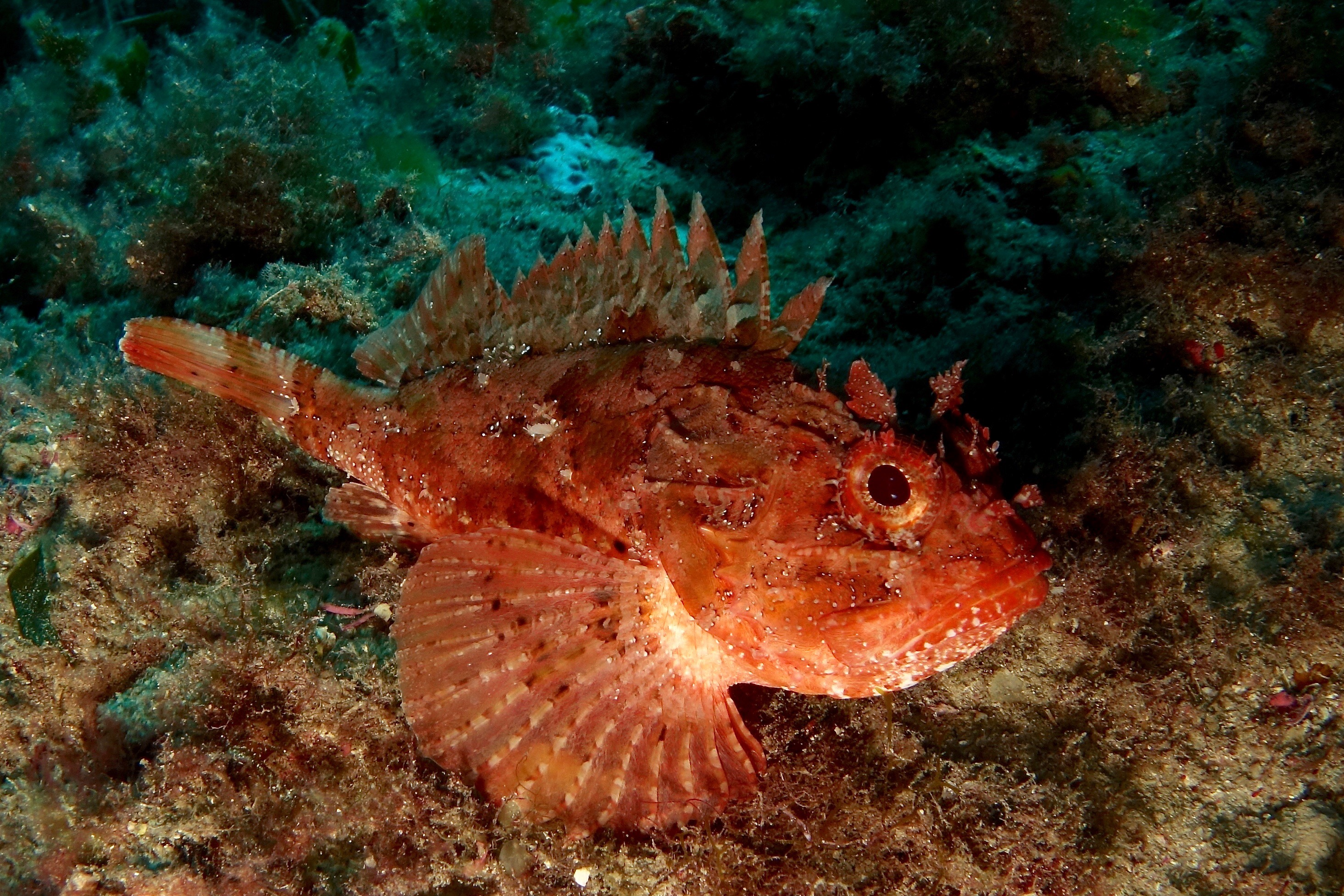
A black scorpionfish in Mallorca, Spain

The black scorpionfish has a maximum length of about 37 cm (15 in), but a more normal adult length is around 15 cm (6 in). The head is broad with a short snout and upwardly angled mouth. A short tentacle is just above the eye and various other shorter tentacles, spines, and flaps of skin decorate the head. The dorsal fin has 12 spines and 9 soft rays and the anal fin has two spines and six soft rays. The pectoral fins are large and oval and have 16-18 rays. The colour of this fish is generally brownish and a dark-pigmented spot occurs between the eighth and ninth dorsal spines. The fins are mottled with brown, and the caudal fin has three vertical brown stripes.

== Distribution and habitat ==
The black scorpionfish is native to the eastern Atlantic Ocean, the Mediterranean Sea, and the Black Sea. Its range extends southwards from the southern half of the British Isles to the Azores, the Canary Islands, and the northwestern coast of Africa. It is found throughout the Mediterranean Sea and the Black Sea down to depths around 800 m (2,625 ft).

== Biology ==
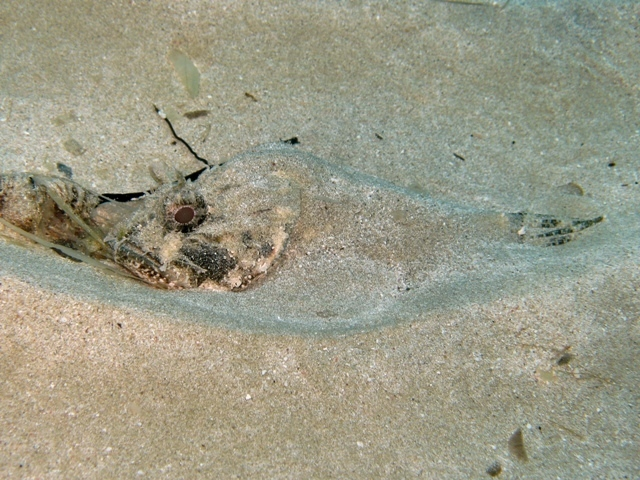
A black scorpionfish buried in the sand near Koufonisi in Greece

The black scorpionfish is a benthic species and is usually found resting among seaweed and on rocks. It is usually solitary and is not territorial. This is one of the fish used by the marine leech Pontobdella muricata as a host.

=== Hunting and diet ===
Like all the members of the Scorpaeninae subfamily, it is an ambush predator. It waits motionless for its prey to pass by and then leaps forward instantly to suck it in with its large mouth. It feeds on small fishes such as blennies and gobies, crustaceans and other bottom-dwelling invertebrates.

=== Reproduction ===
Little is known about its reproduction, it is oviparous, and the females lay eggs that are enclosed in a transparent, mucous mass; sometime in July and August.

=== Defense mechanisms ===
The black scorpionfish has poisonous needles located on its dorsal, anal, and ventral fins, and on its operculum.
