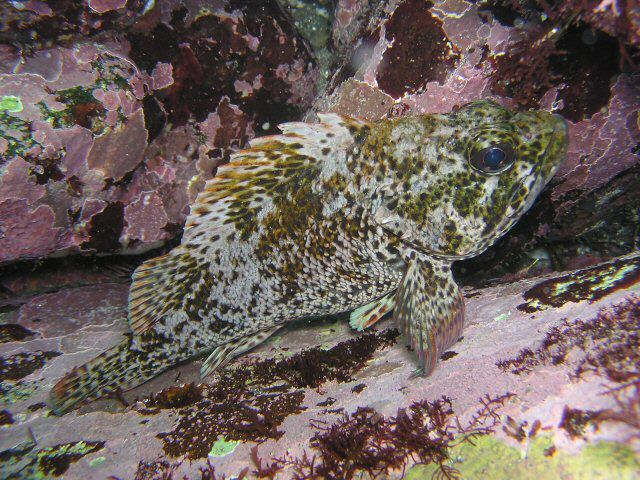

Scientific classification
- Kingdom: Animalia
- Phylum: Chordata
- Class: Actinopterygii
- Order: Perciformes
- Family: Scorpaenidae
- Genus: Sebastes
- Species: S. pachycephalus

Binomial name
- Sebastes pachycephalus Temminck & Schlegel, 1843

Synonyms
- Sebastes pachycephalus pachycephalus Temminck & Schlegel, 1843; Sebastichthys pachycephalus (Temminck & Schlegel, 1843); Sebastodes nigricans Schmidt, 1930; Sebastes pachycephalus nigricans (Schmidt, 1930); Sebastichthys latus Matsubara, 1934

= Sebastes pachycephalus =

Species of fish

Sebastes pachycephalus is a species of marine ray-finned fish belonging to the subfamily Sebastinae, the rockfishes, part of the family Scorpaenidae. It is found in shallow rocky reefs of Northwest Pacific.

== Taxonomy ==
Sebastes pachycephalus was first formally described in 1843 by Coenraad Jacob Temminck and Hermann Schlegel with the type locality given as Japan. Some authorities classify this species in the subgenus Murasoius of which it is the type species. S. pachycephalus was divided into four subspecies but two of these subspecies S.p. nigricans and S.p. latus are now regarded as junior synonyms of S. pachycephalus and the taxon S. nudus has been classified as a valid species within a species complex made up of these two species. The specific name pachycephalus means "wide head", a reference to the broader and deeper head of this species compared to some congeners.

== Description ==
Sebastes pachycephalus has a relatively deep lateral compressed body with a large slight oblique terminal mouth. The head armed with strong preocular, supraocular, postocular, and parietal spines. The space between the eyes is concave. The lower jaw is shorter than the upper jaw and lacks scales. The spiny part of the dorsal fin is clothed in a dense covering of small scales. The dorsal fin has 13 spines and 13 to 16 soft rays while the anal fin has 3 spines and 6 soft rays. The caudal fin is weaklyconvex and almost truncate. This species attains a maximum total length of 42 cm (17 in) and a maximum published weight of 1.6 kg (3.5 lb). The overall colour of the body is brown or dark brown occasionally with a paler brown band or light patterning on the body. There are three light brown bands on the head which radiate from the eye. There may be clear brown spotting on the dorsal, pectoral, anal and caudal fins, although in some fish these may be indistinct.

== Distribution and habitat ==
Sebastes pachycephalus Is found in the northwestern Pacific Ocean where it occurs around Japan and Korea as well as in the Yellow Sea and Bohai Sea off China and off the Russian Sea of Japan coast. This is a demersal fish which is found on shallow rocky reefs.

== Biology ==
Sebastes pachycephalus is, like the other Sebastes rock fishes ovoviviparous. The larvae and small juveniles feed on zooplankton, nearly all crustaceans and their eggs, and shelter among seagrass or macroalgae.
