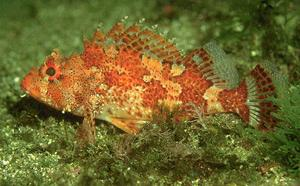
- Scorpaena maderensis in the waters off Croatia

Conservation status
- Least Concern (IUCN 3.1)

Scientific classification
- Kingdom: Animalia
- Phylum: Chordata
- Class: Actinopterygii
- Division: Teleostei
- Order: Perciformes
- Family: Scorpaenidae
- Genus: Scorpaena
- Species: S. maderensis

Binomial name
- Scorpaena maderensis Valenciennes, 1833

Synonyms
- Helicolenus maderensis (Valenciennes, 1833); Sebastapistes maderensis (Valenciennes, 1833); Sebastes maderensis (Valenciennes, 1833); Sebastipistes maderensis (Valenciennes, 1833); Scorpaena rubellio Jordan & Gunn, 1898

= Madeira rockfish =

Species of fish

The Madeira rockfish (Scorpaena maderensis) is a species of scorpionfish (Scorpaenidae) in the genus Scorpaena, found in the coastal waters of the eastern Atlantic Ocean and the Mediterranean Sea. This species reaches a length of around 14 centimetres (5.5 in) SL. The species was described by Achille Valenciennes in 1833 after a specimen from Madeira. Although S. maderensis is well represented in the areas that it is found, many key aspects of its biology are still unknown.

== Description ==
The Madeira rockfish grows between 4.8 cm (1.89 in) and 13.1 cm (5.16 in) and weigh between 1.7 and 48.1 g, with males being larger in both categories. Females achieve their maximum size faster and live longer than males. The maximum recorded length for males and females is around 15 cm (5.91 in) and 9.0 cm (3.54 in) respectively. S. maderensisexhibits many similar characteristics to other Scorpaena, such as spiny fins and a reddish-brown splotched color but there is a lack of sufficient specific information. However, one well-known similar characteristic is the presence venomous spines due to an anterolateral glandular grove containing venom. Venom from Scorpaenidae causes many health issues and can be fatal if not treated.

== Distribution and habitat ==
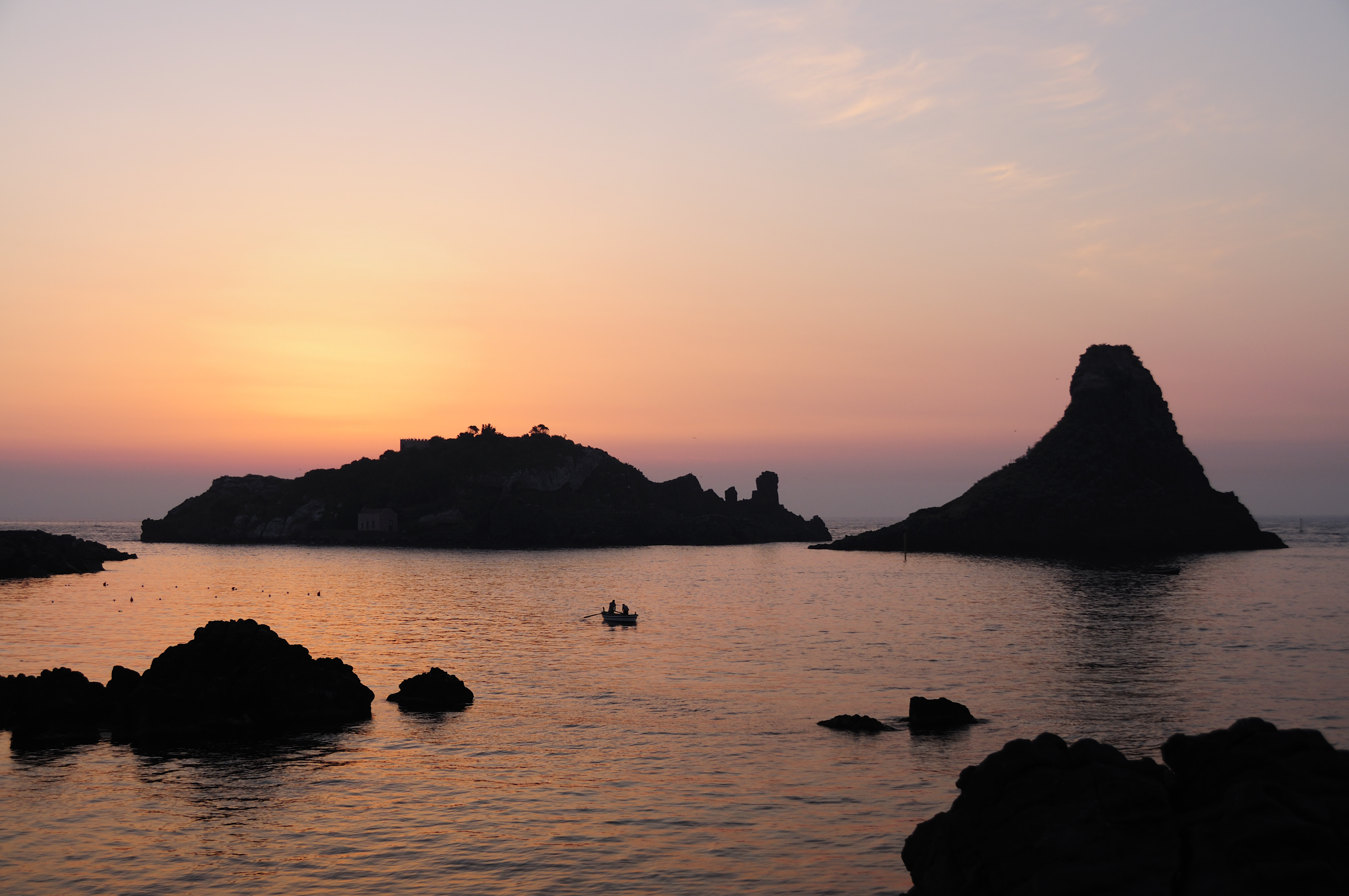
Cyclops Protected Marine Area

The Madeira rockfish inhabits the littoral rocky coastal waters of the northwestern coast of Africa, the Mediterranean Sea and islands in the eastern Atlantic. S. maderensis is considered crypotbenthic, which describes fish that are benthic (living on in or on the seafloor) and cryptic (hiding in crevices or camouflaged). S. maderensis lives in the cracks and crevices of the rocky bottom, where it is able to hunt for prey and hide from predators. Gauging the abundance of S. maderensis throughout the entire Mediterranean Sea is difficult due to lack of data; however extensive research has been done in the Cyclops Protected Marine Area off the coast of Sicily, and S. maderensis was found to be the dominant species in that area. There seems to be conflict on the preferred depth of S. maderensis as some research says 20 to 40m depth, while some finds it mostly above 7m and dropping off at 13m. This discrepancy is due to lack of data collected on S. maderensis, making it difficult to pinpoint a concrete depth range.

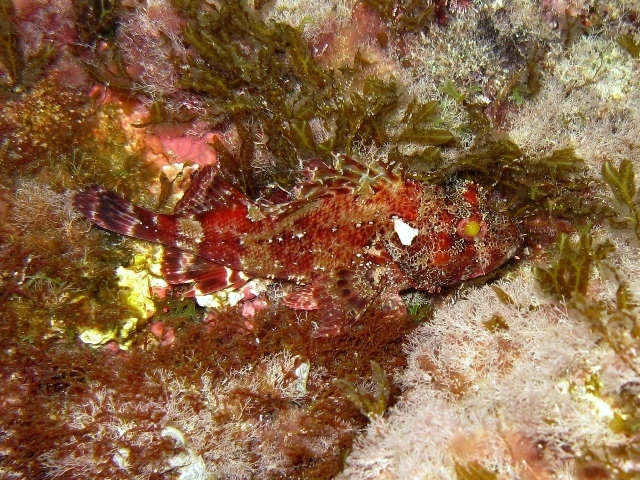
Example of S. maderensis ability to camouflage

== Feeding habits ==
The Madeira rockfish feeds primarily on benthic and epibenthic crustaceans (decapods, amphipods and isopods), while sometimes consuming algae, gastropods, polychaetes and other fishes. Many of the organisms that S. maderensis consumes are considered rare or unimportant (the target prey of very few other species), showing that S. maderensis feeds on a wide variety of species along the trophic spectrum. S. maderensis also has a "strong individual feeding specialization", meaning that consumption varies from individual to individual because S. maderensis are opportunistic feeders, preying on whichever organisms happen to be around them. Feeding of S. maderensis follows a seasonal trend, with higher intensity in the winter months and lower intensity in the summer months.

== Relationship to humans ==
The Madeira rockfish is a target species of the artisanal fisheries along the coasts but is in no danger of overfishing or extinction. While S. maderensis may not be in any danger, the artisanal fisheries may have a negative effect on its reproduction capabilities. Due to their venomous spines they can injure divers, fisherman and the casual swimmer if correct precautions are not taken.
