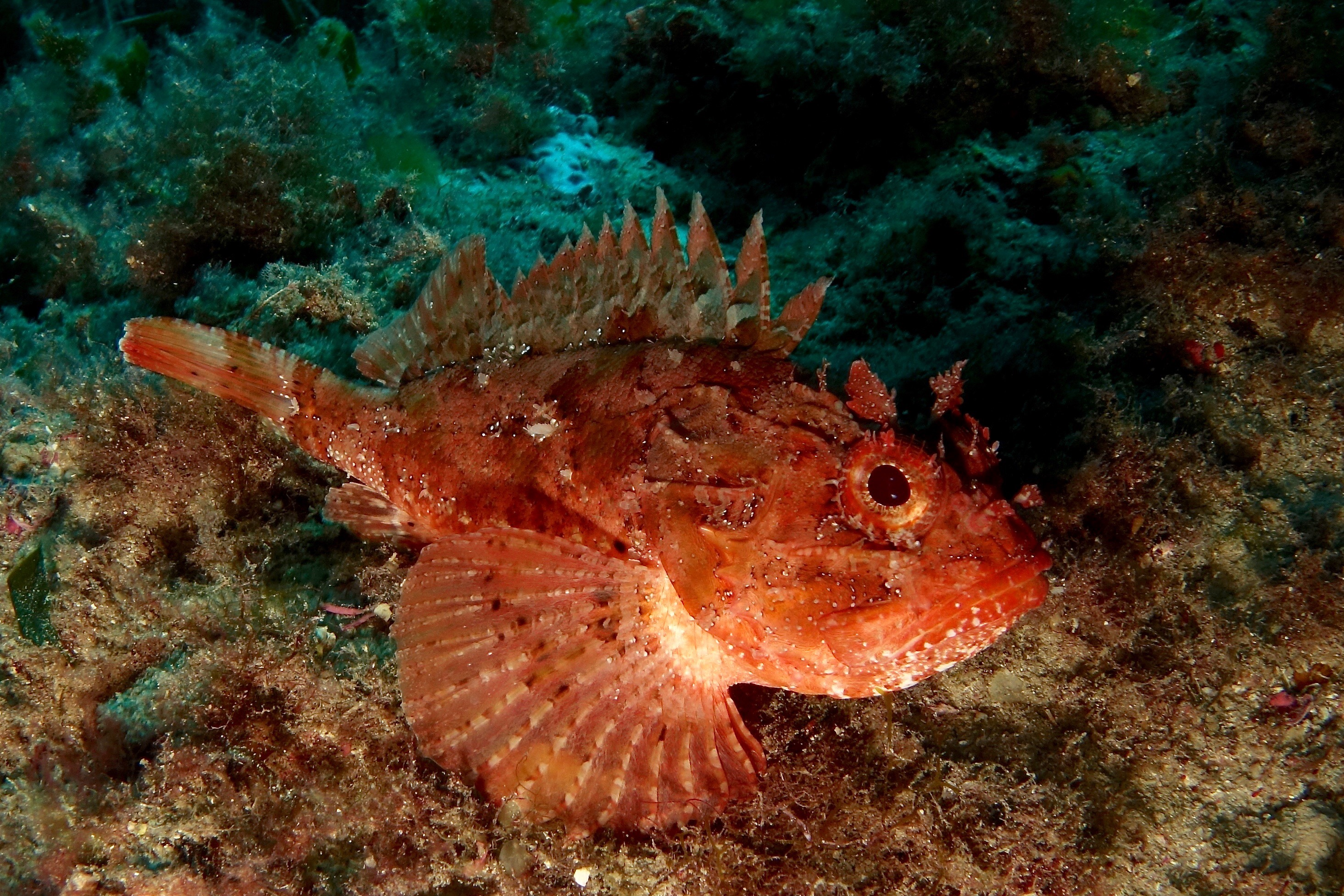
- Scorpaena porcus

Scientific classification
- Kingdom: Animalia
- Phylum: Chordata
- Class: Actinopterygii
- Division: Teleostei
- Order: Perciformes
- Family: Scorpaenidae
- Subfamily: Scorpaeninae
- Genus: Scorpaena; Linnaeus, 1758

Type species
- Scorpaena porcus Linnaeus, 1758

Synonyms
- Holoscorpaena Fowler, 1944; Kantapus J. L. B. Smith, 1947; Osorioia Fowler, 1938; Ruboralga Whitley, 1931

= Scorpaena =

Scorpaena Temporal range: Middle Miocene–recent

Genus of fishes

Scorpaena is a widespread genus of marine ray-finned fish belonging to the family Scorpaenidae, the scorpionfishes.

== Taxonomy ==
Scorpaena was first described as a genus in 1758 by Carl Linnaeus in the 10th Edition of his Systema Naturae. In 1876 Pieter Bleeker designated S. porcus as the type species of the genus. The genus name is based on the Greek word for a scorpion, skorpaina, an allusion to the venomous spines Linnaeus mentioned in his description of S. scrofa.

== Species ==
The 65 recognized species in this genus are:

Image	Scientific name	Common name	Distribution
	Scorpaena afuerae Hildebrand, 1946	Peruvian scorpionfish	southeast Pacific
	Scorpaena agassizii Goode & T. H. Bean, 1896	longfin scorpionfish	North Carolina, USA and northern Gulf of Mexico to northern South America
	Scorpaena albifimbria Evermann & M. C. Marsh, 1900	coral scorpionfish	southern Florida, USA and the Bahamas to Curaçao and probably northern South America
	Scorpaena angolensis Norman, 1935	Angola rockfish	Mauritania to Angola, including Cape Verde
	Scorpaena annobonae Eschmeyer, 1969		on rough bottom at Annobon Island
	Scorpaena ascensionis Eschmeyer, 1971		Southeast Atlantic
	Scorpaena azorica Eschmeyer, 1969		Northeastern Atlantic region in European waters
	Scorpaena bergii Evermann & M. C. Marsh, 1900	goosehead scorpionfish	Bermuda, New York to Florida (USA), Bahamas, and Mexico to northern South America
	Scorpaena brachyptera Eschmeyer, 1965	shortfin scorpionfish	southern Florida in USA and Panama to Venezuela
	Scorpaena brasiliensis G. Cuvier, 1829	Barbfish	Virginia, USA and northern Gulf of Mexico to Brazil
	Scorpaena brevispina Motomura & Senou, 2008	Japanese shortspined scorpionfish	Japan
	Scorpaena bulacephala Motomura, Last & Yearsley, 2005	bullhead scorpionfish	Norfolk Island and off Lord Howe Island, in the northern Tasman Sea.
	Scorpaena calcarata Goode & T. H. Bean, 1882	smooth-head scorpionfish	Canada to North Carolina, USA and northern Gulf of Mexico to Brazil
	Scorpaena canariensis (Sauvage, 1878		Canary Islands and Madeira Island
	Scorpaena cardinalis Solander & J. Richardson, 1842	eastern red scorpionfish	northern New Zealand and offshore islands of the Tasman Sea
	Scorpaena cocosensis Motomura, 2004		Cocos Island and Galápagos
	Scorpaena colorata (C. H. Gilbert, 1905)		Hawaiian Islands
	Scorpaena dispar Longley & Hildebrand, 1940	hunchback scorpionfish	Florida and northern Gulf of Mexico in USA to Brazil
	Scorpaena elachys Eschmeyer, 1965	dwarf scorpionfish	Florida in USA and Antilles
	Scorpaena elongata Cadenat, 1943	slender rockfish	Mediterranean Sea and Morocco to off northern Namibia
	Scorpaena fernandeziana Steindachner, 1875		Desventuradas Is. and Juan Fernández Is.
	Scorpaena gasta Motomura, Last & Yearsley, 2006	ghostly scorpionfish	Western Australia
	Scorpaena grandicornis G. Cuvier, 1829	plumed scorpionfish	Bermuda, Florida (USA), and Honduras to southern Brazil
	Scorpaena grandisquamis J. D. Ogilby, 1910	bigscale scorpionfish	Australia
	Scorpaena grattanica Trunov, 2006		Grattan Bank, Ascension Island
	Scorpaena guttata Girard, 1854	California scorpionfish	Santa Cruz in central California, USA to Punta Abreojos, Baja California; including northern Gulf of California and Guadalupe Island in Mexico
	Scorpaena hatizyoensis Matsubara, 1943		Hachijôjima, Japan
	Scorpaena hemilepidota Fowler, 1938		Philippines
	Scorpaena histrio Jenyns, 1840	player scorpionfish	Mazatlán, Sonora, Mexico to Chile, from Cabo San Lucas, Mexico and Galapagos Islands
	Scorpaena inermis G. Cuvier, 1829	mushroom scorpionfish	Florida (USA), Bahamas, and Yucatan (Mexico) to Curaçao
	Scorpaena isthmensis Meek & Hildebrand, 1928	smooth-cheek scorpionfish	South Carolina, USA and northern Gulf of Mexico to Brazil
	Scorpaena izensis D. S. Jordan & Starks, 1904	Izu scorpionfish	Indo-West Pacific
	Scorpaena jacksoniensis Steindachner, 1866		coastal water of eastern Australia, from southern Queensland to Victoria
	Scorpaena lacrimata J. E. Randall & D. W. Greenfield, 2004		Tahiti
	Scorpaena laevis Troschel, 1866	Senegalese rockfish	Mauritania to Pointe Noire, Congo and including the Azores, and Cape Verde
	Scorpaena loppei Cadenat, 1943	Cadenat's rockfish	Morocco, Mauritania, Portugal, Atlantic coast of Spain, Cyprus and the Mediterranean
	Scorpaena maderensis Valenciennes, 1833	Madeira rockfish	Azores, Madeira, and Morocco to the Canary Islands, Cape Verde and Senegal
	Scorpaena melasma Eschmeyer, 1965		Suriname and off Brazil
	Scorpaena mellissii Günther, 1868	Melliss's scorpionfish	St. Helena
	Scorpaena miostoma Günther, 1877		Chiba Prefecture, Japan to Pusan, South Korea
	Scorpaena mystes D. S. Jordan & Starks, 1895	Pacific spotted scorpionfish	California, USA to northern Chile, including the Galápagos Islands
	Scorpaena neglecta Temminck & Schlegel, 1843		Indo-West Pacific
	Scorpaena normani Cadenat, 1943	Norman's rockfish	Mauritania to southern Angola
	Scorpaena notata Rafinesque, 1810	small red scorpionfish	Bay of Biscay to Senegal, Madeira, Azores and the Canary Islands, including the Mediterranean and the Black Sea
	Scorpaena onaria D. S. Jordan & Snyder, 1900	western scorpionfish	Japan, South Korea, Taiwan and New Caledonia
	Scorpaena orgila Eschmeyer & G. R. Allen, 1971	bold scorpionfish	Easter Island
	Scorpaena papillosa (J. G. Schneider & J. R. Forster, 1801)	red rock cod	southern Australia and New Zealand
	Scorpaena pascuensis Eschmeyer & G. R. Allen, 1971		Easter Island
	Scorpaena pele Eschmeyer & J. E. Randall, 1975		Hawaiian Islands
	Scorpaena pepo Motomura, Poss & K. T. Shao, 2007	pumpkin scorpionfish	Taiwan
	Scorpaena petricola Eschmeyer, 1965		Brazil
	Scorpaena plumieri Bloch, 1789	spotted scorpionfish	Bermuda, Massachusetts, and northern Gulf of Mexico to southern Brazil Eastern Atlantic: Ascension and St. Helena
	Scorpaena porcus Linnaeus, 1758	black scorpionfish	British Isles to the Azores, and the Canary Islands, including Morocco, the Mediterranean Sea and the Black Sea
	Scorpaena regina Wibowo, Johnson & Motomura, 2019	Eastern Queen scorpionfish	Australia
	Scorpaena russula D. S. Jordan & Bollman, 1890	reddish scorpionfish	Culiacán, Sinaloa, Mexico to Peru
	Scorpaena scrofa Linnaeus, 1758	Red scorpionfish	Northeast Atlantic and Mediterranean; Atlantic range from British Isles (rare) to Senegal including Madeira, the Canary Islands, and Cape Verde
	Scorpaena sonorae O. P. Jenkins & Evermann, 1889	Sonora scorpionfish	Mexico
	Scorpaena stephanica Cadenat, 1943	spotted-fin rockfish	Mauritania to Angola
	Scorpaena sumptuosa Castelnau, 1875	western red scorpionfish	southwestern Australia
	Scorpaena thomsoni Günther, 1880		Desventuradas Is. and Juan Fernández Is.
	Scorpaena tierrae Hildebrand, 1946		Chile
	Scorpaena uncinata F. de Buen, 1961		Chile
	Scorpaena vesperalis Wibowo & Motomura, 2020		southwestern Australia
	Scorpaena wellingtoni Victor, 2013		Cove on Isla Isabela in the Galápagos

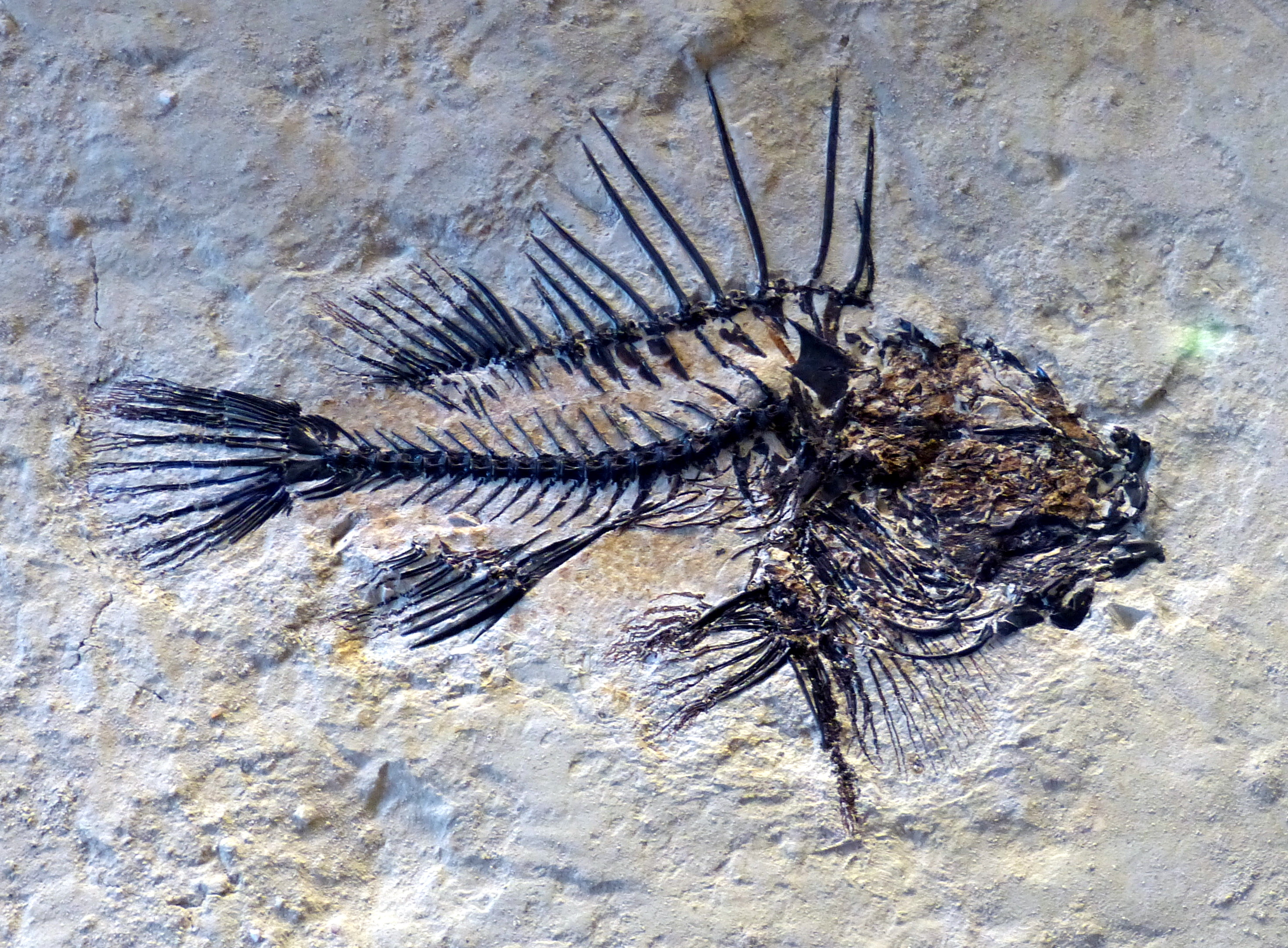
Fossil specimen of Scorpaena prior

In addition, the following fossil species are known:

- †Scorpaena acanthophora Rückert-Ülkümen, 1995 - mid-late Miocene of Pınarhisar, Turkey
- †Scorpaena boulei Arambourg, 1927 - latest Miocene (Messinian) of Algeria
- †Scorpaena jeanneli Arambourg, 1927 - latest Miocene (Messinian) of Algeria
- †Scorpaena prior Heckel, 1861 - middle Miocene (Langhian) of Austria

The fossil species †‘"Scorpaena" minima Kramberger, 1882 from the Middle Miocene (Serravallian) of Croatia & Serbia clearly appears to be a valid scorpaenid taxon distinct from S. prior, but unique features in its otolith morphology make it uncertain whether it belongs to Scorpaena or a different genus. It is only tentatively retained in Scorpaena. The potential fossil species †Scorpaena osterodenensis Schwarzhans, 2007 is known from the middle Eocene of Germany, but only from isolated otoliths.

== Characteristics ==
Scorpaena scorpionfishes have a very bony head which is armed with numerous spines. There is a horizontal bony ridge beneath the eyes with 1-4 spines. They have an occipital pit. The uppermost spine on the preoperculum is the longest. There are patches of teeth on the roof of the mouth and at its sides. There are 12 spines and between 7 and 10 soft rays in the dorsal fin while the anal fin has 3 spines and 5 soft rays. There are 16 to 21 fin rays in the pectoral fin with some of the upper rays being branched in adults. They have relatively large scales and the scales on the body are smooth. The lateral line is complete and its scales are tubed. They vary in size from a total length of 5.6 cm (2.2 in) in S. pascuensis to 45.7 cm (18.0 in) in S. mystes.

== Distribution and habitat ==
Scorpaena scorpionfishes are found in the tropical and warm temperate zones of the Atlantic, Indian and Pacific Oceans. They are demersal fishes occurring in a number of habitats but are typically found in rocky or coralline habitats.

== Biology ==
Scorpaena scorpionfishes are solitary, ambush predators which use their cryptically patterned, irregularly shaped bodies to camouflage themselves on the substrate. They have large mouths and will eat prey up to half their own size, the vortex created by the sudden opening of the mouth drawing the prey in. They have venomous spines which can inflict serious injuries on humans.

== Fisheries ==
Scorpaena scorpionfishes are caught by recreational and commercial fisheries in some parts of the world. The flesh is regarded as very palatable.
