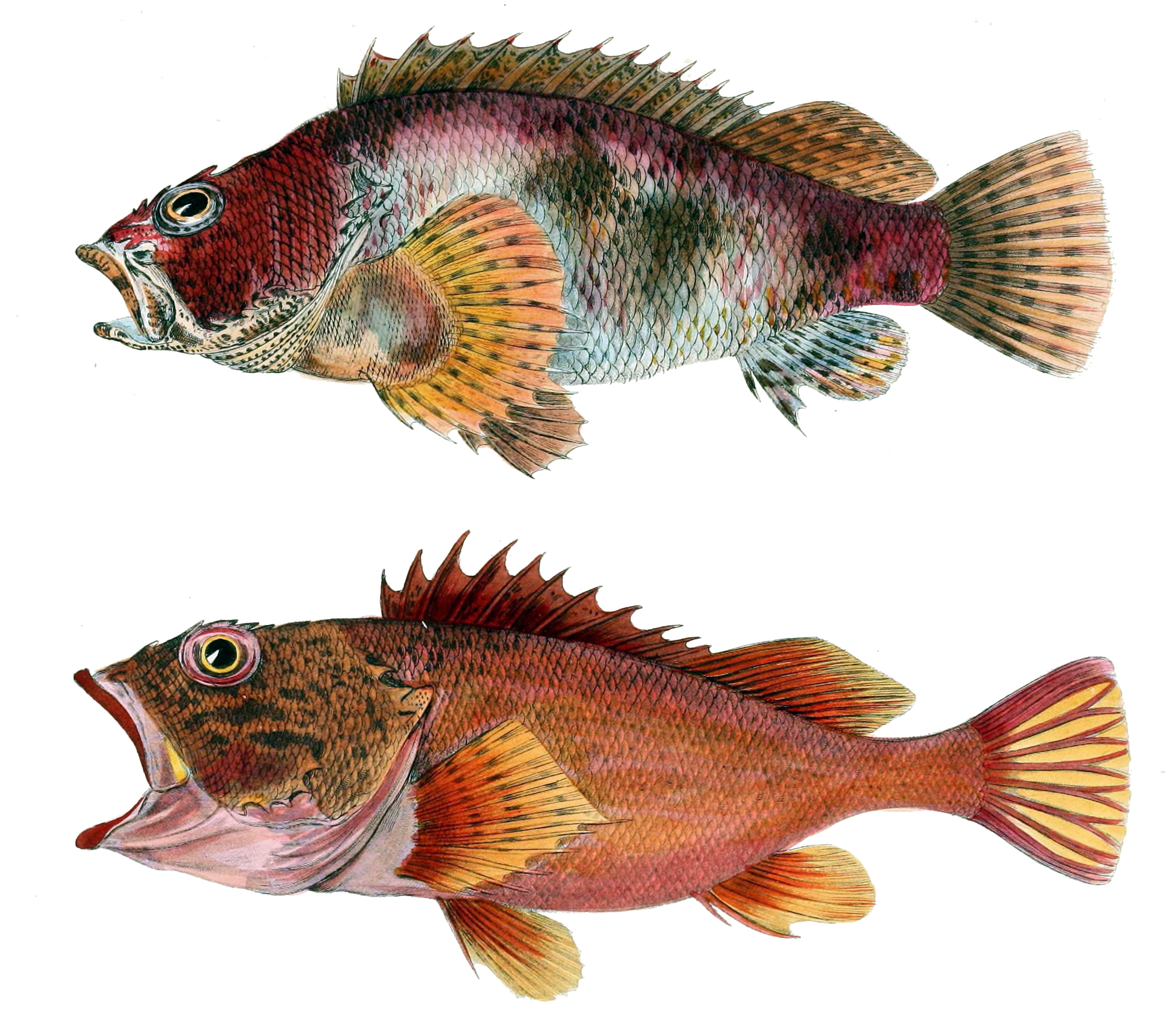

Scientific classification
- Kingdom: Animalia
- Phylum: Chordata
- Class: Actinopterygii
- Division: Teleostei
- Order: Perciformes
- Family: Scorpaenidae
- Genus: Sebastiscus
- Species: S. marmoratus

Binomial name
- Sebastiscus marmoratus (Cuvier, 1829)

Synonyms
- Sebastes marmoratus Cuvier, 1829

= Sebastiscus marmoratus =

Species of fish

Sebastiscus marmoratus, the sea ruffe, false kelpfish or dusky stingfish, is a species of marine ray-finned fish belonging to the subfamily Sebastinae, the rockfishes, part of the family Scorpaenidae. It is found in the Western Pacific from southern Japan to the Philippines. It has also been sighted three times in Australia.

== Taxonomy ==
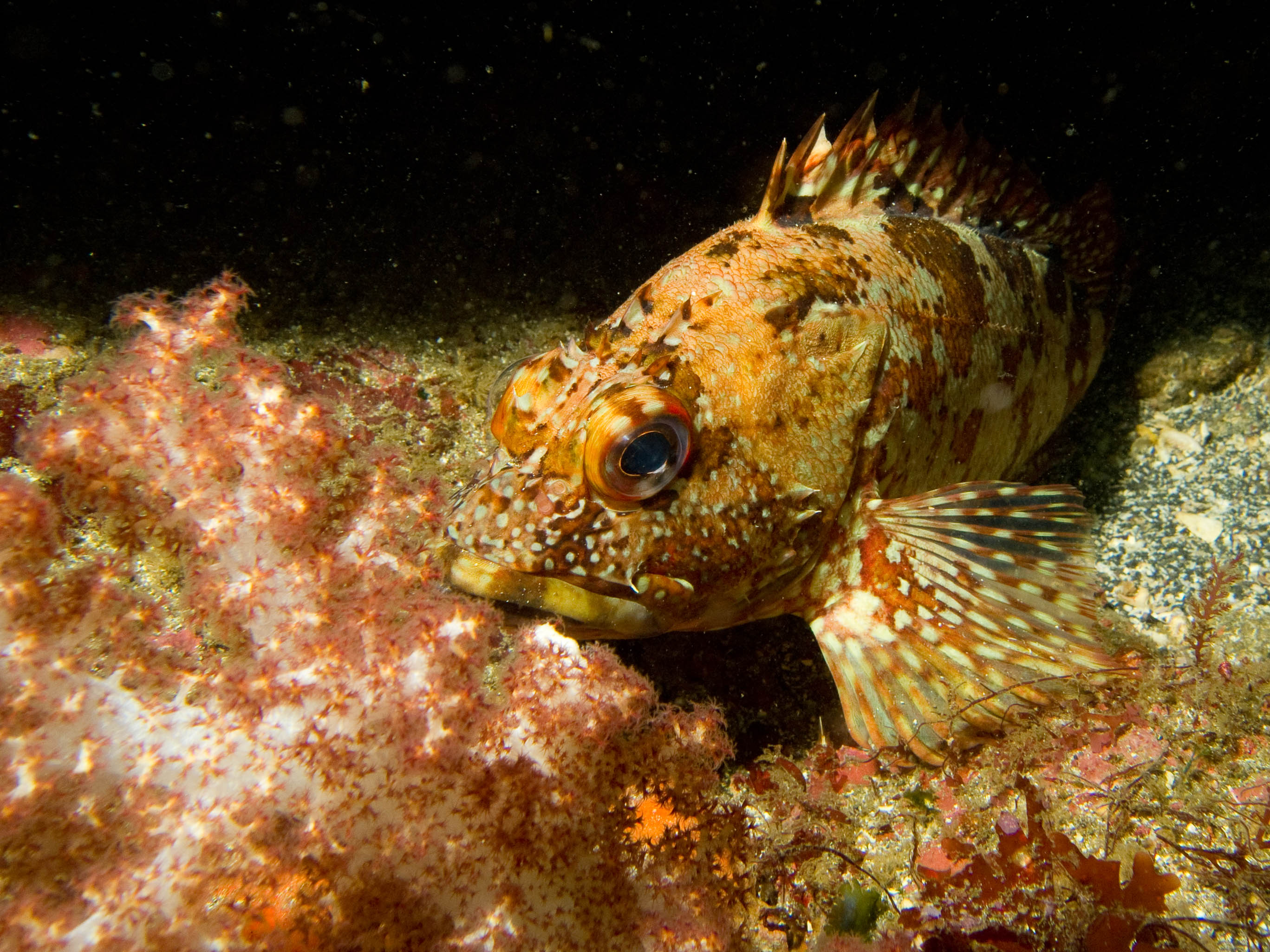
Sebastiscus marmoratus

Sebastiscus marmoratus was first formally described as Sebastes marmoratus in 1829 by the French zoologist Georges Cuvier with no type locality given, but it is thought to be Japan. When David Starr Jordan and Edwin Chapin Starks described the genus Sebastiscus designated S. marmoratus as the type species. The specific name marmoratus means "marbled", Cuvier described this species from an illustration which showed the fish as having a red back and the sides marbled with brown or dusky. Living specimens have a variable coloration ranging from yellowish to brown or red with a blotching.

== Description ==
Sebasticus marmoratus has a moderately deep body. The upper rear margin of the pectoral fins are almost straight, There is no suborbital spine or suborbital ridge and there is no flap of skin at the axil of the pectoral fin. The caudal fin is rounded. The dorsal fin has 12 spines and between 10 and 13 soft rays while the anal fin has 3 spines and 5 spines. The overall colour is yellowish-brown, reddish to blackish marked with white to dark blotches. There is a series of dark blotches or saddles along the back, there is white spotting scattered on the lower flank but any above the lateral line are indistinct. This species attains a maximum total length of 36.2 cm (14.3 in) and a maximum published weight of 2.8 kg (6.2 lb).

== Distribution and habitat ==
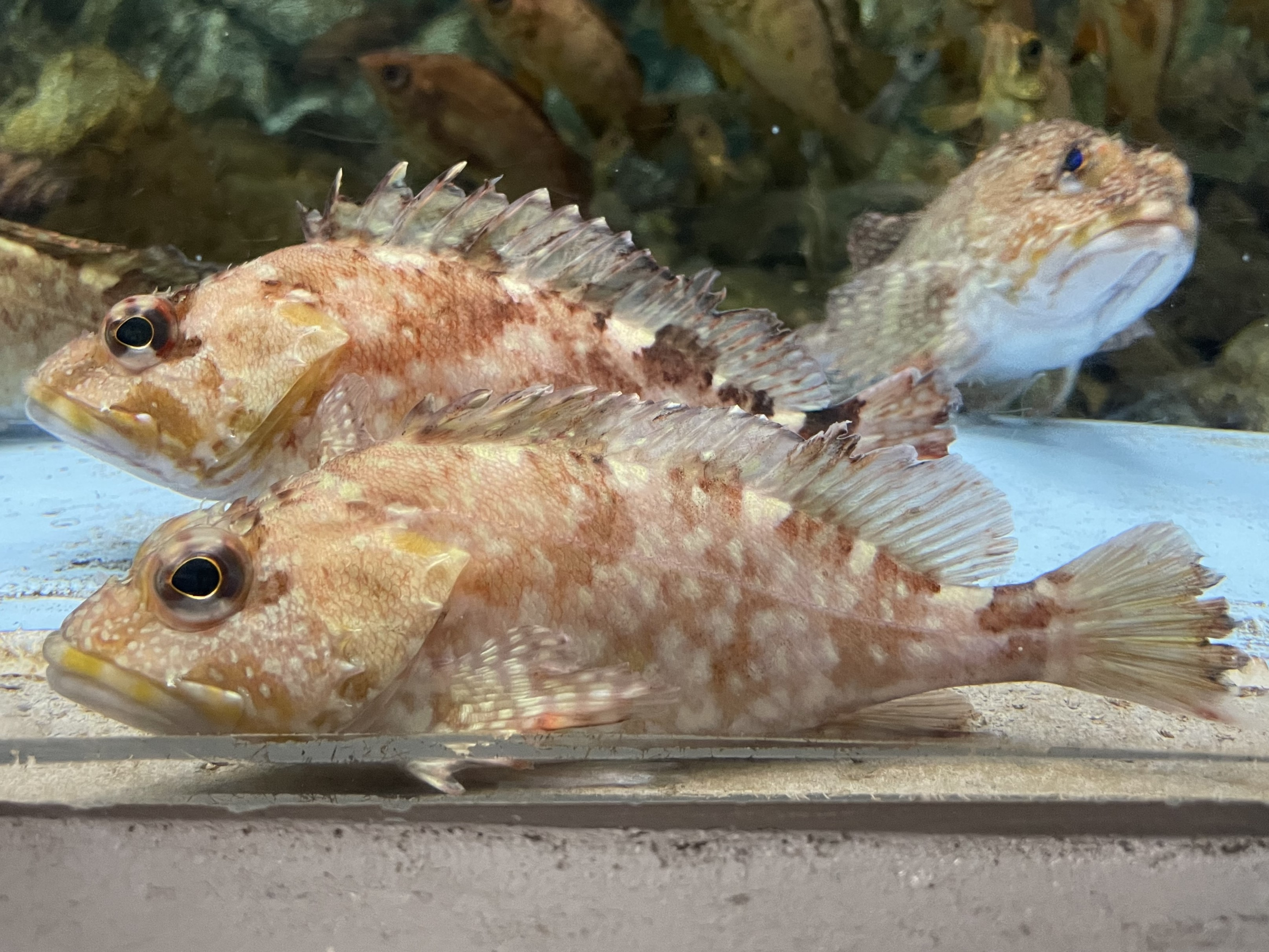
At Notojima Aquarium in Japan

Sebasticus marmoratus is found in the western Pacific Ocean from Vietnam north to China, Japan and Korea and east to the Philippines, it is found as far north as southern Hokkaido. There are extralimital records of S. marmoratus, it has been recorded twice in Australia in Australia and once in the North Atlantic off Norway. These records are thought to probably be a result of fish being transported to these locations in the ballast water of ships. This is a demersal fish, found over rocky substrates near to the shore in seaweed beds in lagoons and seaward reefs.

== Biology ==
Sebasticus marmoratus feeds mainly on crustaceans and smaller fishes. It is ovoviviparous, the females give birth to live larvae. This species has venom on the spines of the dorsal, anal and pelvic fins.

== Aquaculture ==
Sebasticus marmoratus is cultured by commercial aquaculture facilities in Japan.
