= Cardiocephaloides longicollis =

Scientific classification
- Kingdom: Animalia
- Phylum: Platyhelminthes
- Class: Trematoda
- Order: Diplostomida
- Family: Strigeidae
- Genus: Cardiocephaloides
- Species: C. longicollis

Binomial name
- Cardiocephaloides longicollis (Rudolphi, 1819)

Species of fluke

Cardiocephaloides longicollis is a species of flukes. The life cycle of C. longicollis is asexual as well as complex. Its asexual stage resides in the body of whelks where it replicates many times, and eventually its eggs are dispersed in the water through feces. C.longicollis begin their early life as free swimming miracidia larvae in the water. They go on to infect snails (intermediate host), and a variety of fishes, usually second intermediate host, in the form of a cercariae. While C.longicollis has previously been recorded in 19 fish species, researchers have found 12 other species which are viable hosts for C.longicollis making for a grand total of 31 aquatic species. The final host for this parasite are the gulls that eat the infected fish in which the parasite has formed cysts in.

== Life cycle ==
The asexual life cycle of C. longicollis is complex which involves carnivorous scavenging whelks, a variety of fish, and gulls. The asexual stages of C. longicollis reside in the body of whelks where it replicates many times, producing a stream of swimming larvae call cercariae. The cercariae then go in the water to infect a variety of different fish. While C. longicollis has previously been recorded in 19 fish species, researchers have found 12 other species which are also viable hosts for C. longicollis, making for a grand total of 31 aquatic species. The final host for this parasite are gulls, when they eat the fluke that reside in parasitised fish.

== Host ==
The occurrence of C. longicollis was restricted to 3 species of Nassaridae, N. corniculum, N. reticulatus and N. neritea. Data demonstrate that C. longicollis has a much wider host spectrum in the second intermediate host, by recently adding 12 new host records: Diplodus sargus, D. dentex, Spicara maena, Spondyliosoma cantharus, Pagellus acarne, Pagellus erythrinus, Pagellus bogaraveo, Oblada melanura, Zosterisessor ophiocephalus, Coris julis, C. chromis, Serranus scriba. The Sparidae, Gobiidae and Labriidae are previously recorded host families and the Pomacentridae and Serranidae as new host families, resulting in a total of 31 fish host species from nine fish families.

According to the World Register of Marine Species, C. longicollis has been observed in the following hosts:

=== Intermediate ===
- Garfish (Belone belone)
- Annular sea bream (Diplodus annularis)
- Sphinx blenny (Aidablennius sphinx)
- Belone euxini
- Peacock blenny (Salaria pavo)
- Rusty blenny (Parablennius sanguinolentus)
- Tentacled blenny (Parablennius tentacularis)
- Bogue (Boops boops)
- Salema porgy (Sarpa salpa)
- Five-spotted wrasse (Symphodus roissali)
- East Atlantic peacock wrasse (Symphodus tinca)
- Goldsinny wrasse (Ctenolabrus rupestris)
- Tritia neritea
- Diplodus vulgaris
- Shore rockling
- Three-spined stickleback
- Bucchich's goby
- Giant goby
- Black goby
- Grass goby
- Sand steenbras
- Golden grey mullet
- So-iuy mullet
- Knout goby
- Flathead grey mullet
- Mullus barbatus ponticus
- Tritia corniculum
- Netted dog whelk
- Round goby
- Ratan goby
- Blackspot seabream
- Red porgy
- Common goby
- Proterorhinus marmoratus
- Ninespine stickleback
- Atlantic bonito
- Brown meagre
- Blackhand sole
- Gilt-head bream
- Spicara smaris
- Ocellated wrasse
- Red-black triplefin
- Umbrina cirrosa
- Atlantic stargazer
- Viviparous eelpout

=== Definitive ===
- Great egret
- European herring gull
- Yellow-legged gull
- Laughing gull
- Caspian gull
- Common gull
- Black-tailed gull
- Ring-billed gull
- Lesser black-backed gull
- Glaucous gull
- Pallas's gull
- Great black-backed gull
- Little gull
- Black-headed gull
- Sandwich tern

== Transmission by human intervention ==
The parasite, C. longicollis, infections fish that hang around near the sea floor or near the coast, also in shallow lagoon which is significantly higher. This is probably because they are in close proximity to the whelks which are sources of infection. Fish that are around ≤14 cm in length are usually infected with the parasite. The fish in those size range have on average of 73 larvae in their brain. One fish has been recorded to have 220 parasites in its brain.

These larger fish live in deeper waters which are out of the gulls' reach, so regardless of their heavy larval fluke load, gulls can't get to them. Those parasites are at a dead end, where they are destined to die or end up in the stomach of another predator which is not a gull. Human intervention are the reason infection is reoccurring. As many as 31 species of fish can be infected with C. longicollis which are targeted by commercial fishing operations, or end up as by-catch. Many of those by-catch fishes are loaded with parasites and discarded at the port. This pile of parasite-laden fish present opportunistic gulls with a rich and accessible feast. Thus contributing to the transmission.
