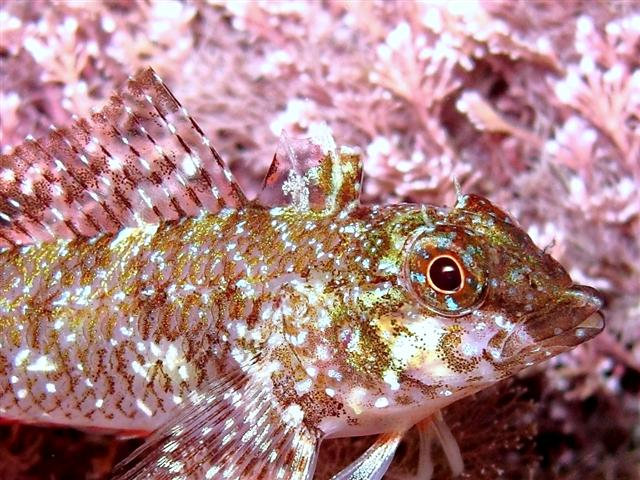

Conservation status
- Least Concern (IUCN 3.1)

Scientific classification
- Kingdom: Animalia
- Phylum: Chordata
- Class: Actinopterygii
- Order: Blenniiformes
- Family: Tripterygiidae
- Genus: Tripterygion
- Species: T. tartessicum

Binomial name
- Tripterygion tartessicum Carreras-Carbonell, Pascual & Macpherson, 2007

= Tripterygion tartessicum =

Species of fish

Tripterygion tartessicum is a species of fish in the family Tripterygiidae, the threefin blennies. It is widespread in the Mediterranean Sea and eastern Atlantic Ocean, where it occurs along the southern coast of Spain and from Morocco to Tunisia. It is a tropical demersal fish measuring up to 7.7 centimetres (3.0 in) in length.

The species was described in 2007 when red-black triplefin (Tripterygion tripteronotum) specimens were determined to be individuals of a new species. Its specific name refers to the semi-mythical city of Tartessos and its associated culture, which was located in southern Spain, within the range of this species.
