= Short-beaked garfish =

Conservation status
- Least Concern (IUCN 3.1)

Scientific classification
- Kingdom: Animalia
- Phylum: Chordata
- Class: Actinopterygii
- Order: Beloniformes
- Family: Belonidae
- Genus: Belone
- Species: B. svetovidovi

Binomial name
- Belone svetovidovi Collette & Parin, 1970

Species of fish

The short-beaked garfish (Belone svetovidovi) is an uncommon species of needlefish in marine waters of the eastern Atlantic Ocean. This pelagic needlefish is present off the coasts of Ireland, Spain, Portugal, and the United Kingdom, and possibly in the Mediterranean Sea, as well. This species was thought to be the same as the garfish (Belone belone) because they share the same waters. The short-beaked garfish matures at 30 cm (12 in) and can grow to a maximum of 65 cm (26 in) while Belone belone can be 95 cm (37 in). Like all needlefish, this one has an elongated body with beak-like jaws that are lined with razor sharp teeth. The short-beaked garfish's lower jaw is longer than the upper. Its body is silvery like most needlefish and has a black stripe running across its lateral line. The dorsal and anal fins are very close to the caudal peduncle. These fish are oviparous. Eggs may be found attached to objects in the water by tendrils on the egg's surface. These spherical eggs are dispersed on the sea floor (demersal). Not much is known about this fish's feeding habits. It likely preys on small oceangoing fish. It has been caught using mackerel. Needlefish tend to be surface fish, so are preyed upon like Atlantic mackerel, European pilchard, sand smelt, etc. The specific name honours Anatolii Nikolaevich Svetovidov (1903–1985) who was an ichthyologist at the Zoological Institute in Saint Petersburg, Russia and a colleague of N.V. Parin.
