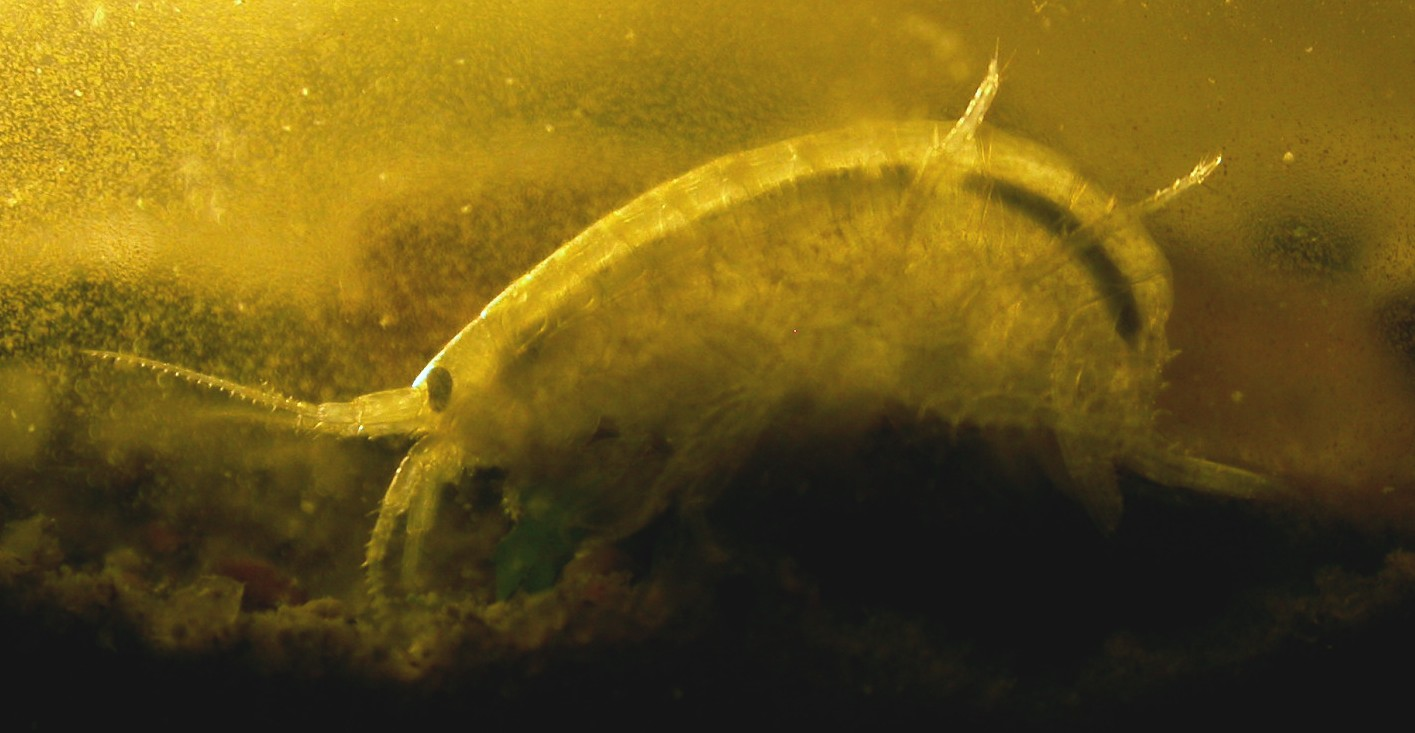

Scientific classification
- Kingdom: Animalia
- Phylum: Arthropoda
- Clade: Pancrustacea
- Class: Malacostraca
- Order: Amphipoda
- Family: Gammaridae
- Genus: Gammarus
- Species: G. lacustris

Binomial name
- Gammarus lacustris G. O. Sars, 1863

= Gammarus lacustris =

Species of crustacean

Gammarus lacustris is an aquatic amphipod.

== Description ==
Gammarus lacustris is semi-transparent and lacks a webbed tail. It may be colorless, brown, reddish or bluish in color, depending on the local environment. It has seven abdominal segments, a fused cephalothorax, and two pairs of antennae. Unlike other crustaceans, amphipods lack carapaces and have laterally compressed bodies. Gammarids are referred to as scuds or sideswimmers. G. lacustris resembles a freshwater shrimp.

== Life cycle ==
The female carries eggs in a brood pouch on its ventral side. G. lacustris in higher elevations were more likely to have fewer but larger eggs than those living at lower elevations. G. lacustris undergoes several molts and juveniles resemble the adult.

== Ecology ==
Gammarus lacustris plays an important role in many of the freshwater ecosystems that it inhabits. It is a detritivore and may also consume algae, mainly diatoms. It is considered an indicator species for the overall health and stability of the ecosystem. G. lacustris can also inhabit a wide array of environments, ranging from low altitude calcium-rich lakes to high altitude, cold, and calcium-poor lakes. This influences its biology: at low altitudes, it is known to die after first reproduction, but in colder waters, it lives to reproduce repeatedly.

=== Temperature ===
In many species feeding behaviour is affected by temperature, i.e. the amount of food consumed often increases at warmer temperatures. However, when G. lacustris feeds on three different parasite species (Diplostomum spp., Apatemon spp. and Trichobilharzia spp.) no such effect of temperature on feeding is seen.

=== Parasites ===
As a small aquatic invertebrate G. lacustris is an important food source for many organisms. Birds, fishes, and some insects are known to prey upon G. lacustris. As many other species of small invertebrates, it serves as an intermediate host for several parasite species (e.g. Pomphorhynchus laevis). G. lacustris typically shows photophobic behaviour, but when parasitized this can be altered to photophilic behaviour when infected by Pomphorhynchus laevis, which is a host manipulation parasite, like many others. Parasites can affect the diel migration of G. lacustris, making it more visible and susceptible to predation most likely aiding parasite transmission. More mature parasites have greater effects on hosts.

== Distribution ==
Gammarus lacustris has been noted in northwestern Europe, Russia, and North America. Its precise range has yet to be defined. It can be found in shallow or deep lakes and in slow-moving rivers. It is more abundant in fishless lakes than in those with fish. Its distribution follows the thermocline in the water.
