= Tetracotyle =

Scientific classification
- Kingdom: Animalia
- Phylum: Platyhelminthes
- Class: Trematoda
- Order: Diplostomida
- Family: Strigeidae
- Genus: Tetracotyle; De Filippi, 1854

Genus of flatworms

Tetracotyle is a genus of flatworms belonging to the family Strigeidae.

The species of this genus are found in Europe and Northern America.

Species:

- Tetracotyle bicolandiae Tubangui, 1933
- Tetracotyle colubri Linstow, 1877
