= Ichthyocotylurus =

Scientific classification
- Kingdom: Animalia
- Phylum: Platyhelminthes
- Class: Trematoda
- Order: Diplostomida
- Family: Strigeidae
- Genus: Ichthyocotylurus; Odening, 1969

Genus of flatworms

Ichthyocotylurus is a genus of flatworms belonging to the family Strigeidae.

The species of this genus are found in Europe and Northern America.

Species:

- Ichthyocotylurus erraticus (Rudolphi, 1809) Odening, 1969
- Ichthyocotylurus pileatus (Rudolphi, 1802) Odening, 1969
