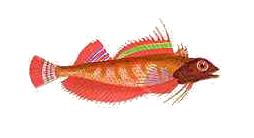
- Tripterygion tripteronotum

Scientific classification
- Kingdom: Animalia
- Phylum: Chordata
- Class: Actinopterygii
- Division: Teleostei
- Order: Blenniiformes
- Family: Tripterygiidae
- Subfamily: Tripterygiinae
- Genus: Tripterygion; Risso, 1827

Type species
- Tripterygion nasus Risso, 1810

Species
- See text

= Tripterygion =

Tripterygion Temporal range: Late Miocene to Present

Genus of fishes

Tripterygion is a genus of fish in the family Tripterygiidae, the threefin blennies, the species of which are found in the north eastern Atlantic Ocean, the Mediterranean Sea and the Black Sea.

== Species ==
- Tripterygion delaisi Cadenat & Blache, 1970 – black-faced blenny
- Tripterygion melanurus Guichenot, 1850
- Tripterygion tartessicum Carreras-Carbonell, Pascual & Macpherson, 2007
- Tripterygion tripteronotum (Risso, 1810) – red-black triplefin

== Gallery ==
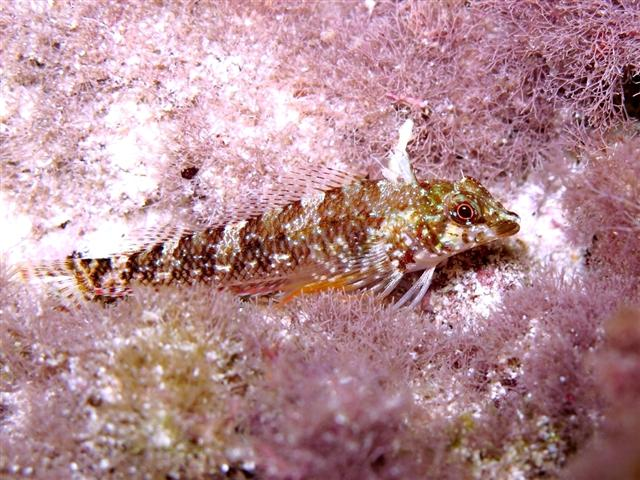
Tripterygion tartessicum

Tripterygion melanurus
