= Cardiocephaloides =

Scientific classification
- Kingdom: Animalia
- Phylum: Platyhelminthes
- Class: Trematoda
- Order: Diplostomida
- Family: Strigeidae
- Genus: Cardiocephaloides; Sudarikov, 1959

Genus of flatworms

Cardiocephaloides is a genus of flatworms belonging to the family Strigeidae.

The genus has almost cosmopolitan distribution.

Species:

- Cardiocephaloides brandesii (Szidat, 1928)
- Cardiocephaloides hillii (Johnston, 1904)
- Cardiocephaloides longicollis (Rudolphi, 1819)
- Cardiocephaloides medioconiger (Dubois & Perez-Vigueras, 1949)
- Cardiocephaloides megaloconus (Cable, Connor & Balling, 1960)
- Cardiocephaloides physalis (Lutz, 1927)
