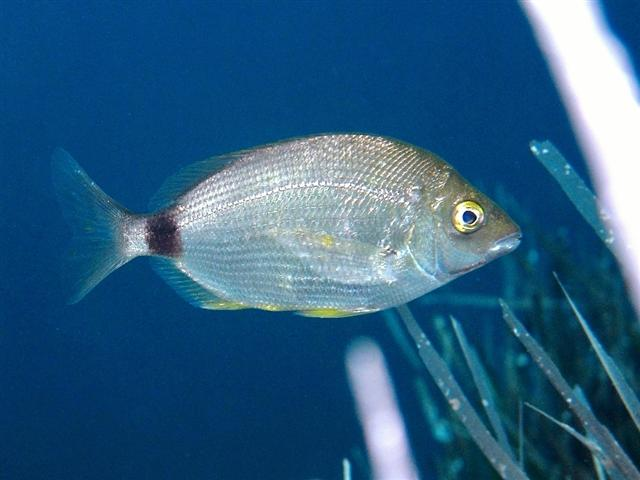
- Annular sea bream in Menorca (Balearic Island, Spain)

Conservation status
- Least Concern (IUCN 3.1)

Scientific classification
- Kingdom: Animalia
- Phylum: Chordata
- Class: Actinopterygii
- Division: Teleostei
- Order: Acanthuriformes
- Family: Sparidae
- Genus: Diplodus
- Species: D. annularis

Binomial name
- Diplodus annularis (Linnaeus, 1758)

Synonyms
- Sciaena melanura Pallas, 1814; Sparus annularis Linnaeus, 1758; Sparus sparlotus Rafinesque, 1810; Sparus sparulus Lacépède, 1802

= Diplodus annularis =

Annular sea bream

Species of fish

Diplodus annularis, the annular seabream is a species of marine ray-finned fish belonging to the family Sparidae, which includes the seabreams and porgies. This species is found in the Eastern Atlantic Ocean and Mediterranean.

== Taxonomy ==
Diplodus annularis was first formally described as Sparus annularis in 1758 in the 10th edition of Systema Naturae by Carl Linnaeus with its type locality given as the Adriatic Sea. In 1810, Constantine Samuel Rafinesque placed S. annularis in the monospecific genus Diplodus, and so this species is the type species of that genus by monotypy. The genus Diplodus is placed in the family Sparidae within the order Spariformes by the 5th edition of Fishes of the World. Some authorities classify this genus in the subfamily Sparinae, but the 5th edition of Fishes of the World does not recognise subfamilies within the Sparidae.

== Etymology ==
Diplodus annularis has the specific name annularis, meaning "ring-shaped", a reference to ring shaped marking around the caudal peduncle.

== Description ==
Diplodus annularis has a deep, compressed body with an elongated ovate shape. Its dorsal fin is supported by 11 spines and between 11 and 13 soft rays while there are 3 spines and 11 or 12 soft rays supporting the anal fin. There are 8 incisor-like teeth in the front of each jaw with 1 to 3 rows of molar-like teeth just behind the incisors. The overall colour is silvery grey with a yellowish tint with an almost complete dark ring around the caudal peduncle just behind the dorsal and anal fins. The pelvic fins are yellowish and the other fins are pale. The juvenile shave dark bars and the ring on the caudal peduncle is complete. The annular seabream has a maximum published total length of 28 cm (11 in), although 13 cm (5.1 in) is more typical, and a maximum published weight of 330 g (12 oz).

== Distribution and habitat ==
Diplodus annularis is widespread in the Mediterranean Sea, in the Black and Azov Seas and in the Eastern Atlantic Ocean from the Bay of Biscay south to the Straits of Gibraltar, including Madeira and the Canary Islands. It occurs at depths between 0 and 90 m (0 and 295 ft) over rocky, sandy bottoms and seagrass beds.

== Biology ==
Diplodus annularis, like other sparids, is mainly predatory and a study in the Gulf of Gabes in Tunisia found that their diet was dominated by molluscs and other bony fishes, with crustaceans and plant material also being important. This species is an intermediate host of the fluke Cardiocephaloides longicollis which has gulls as its terminal host with snails as the primary host. Fishing discards which are fed on by gulls has increased the rate of infection of annular breams off Valencia in eastern Spain. In the Gulf of Gabes, the spawning period runs from March to June, peaking in May. In the Canary Islands the spawning season is slightly earlier than in Tunisia. This species is mainly a rudimentary hermaphrodite with fish becoming sexually mature as either males or females but in some populations, they can be protandrous hermaphrodites.

== Fisheries ==
Diplodus annularis is a target species for commercial fisheries and, in Sicily and the Adriatic, the fishery is semi-industrial while in others it is caught in artisanal fisheries. It is also targeted by recreational anglers. It is caught using trawl nets, beach seines, hand lines, bottom long lines and with gill and trammel nets. It is readily found in fish markets in the Mediterranean, for example it is easily available in Israel, but very infrequently sold in Morocco. The fish landed are sold fresh or as fish preserved by freezing and drying and salting. It is not highly valued as a food fish. Landed fish also go to make fishmeal and oil. There is an important fishery for this species in the Gulf of Gabes.
