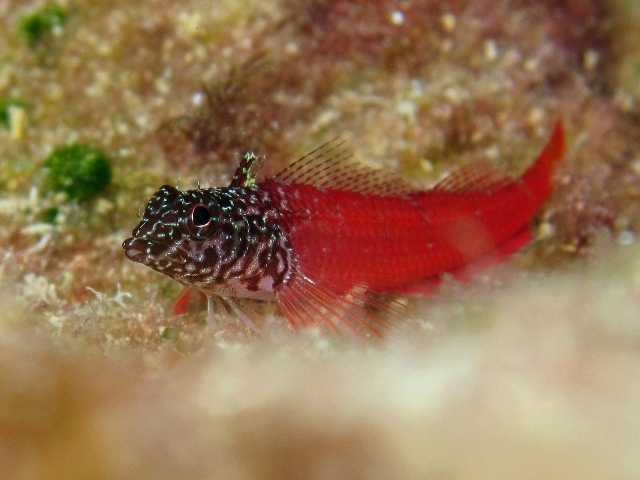
- T. melanurum in Koufonisi, Greece

Conservation status
- Least Concern (IUCN 3.1)

Scientific classification
- Kingdom: Animalia
- Phylum: Chordata
- Class: Actinopterygii
- Order: Blenniiformes
- Family: Tripterygiidae
- Genus: Tripterygion
- Species: T. melanurum

Binomial name
- Tripterygion melanurum Guichenot, 1850

Synonyms
- Tripterygion melanurus Guichenot, 1850; Tripterygion minor Kolombatovic, 1892; Tripterygium minor Kolombatovic, 1892

= Tripterygion melanurum =

Species of fish

Tripterygion melanurum is a species of fish in the family Tripterygiidae, the threefin blennies. It is widespread in the Mediterranean Sea, where it occurs around the Balearic Islands and off the coasts of southern Sardinia, Algeria, Tunisia, Israel, Lebanon, Greece, Cyprus, and southern Turkey. It is a marine subtropical demersal fish measuring up to 5.3 centimetres (2.1 in) in length.

== Description ==
Tripterygion melanurum have an average size of 4.3 centimetres (1.7 in), though some individuals are as big as 5.3 centimetres (2.1 in). They are permanently red in color and females and non-territorial males have a marbled head. Territorial males have a black head, are slightly darker and usually have vertical bars and white spots across their back, while they also have longer rays in their second dorsal fin.

== Biology ==
Adults of Tripterygion melanurum are demersal fish that live in dimly-lit areas with vegetation, usually at a depth of less than 40 meters. They are solitary in nature and males are very territorial. They are carnivorous, feeding on small invertebrates with a preference for harpacticoids.

=== Breeding ===
T. melanurum are oviparous and they lay eggs. In order to breed, several females lay their eggs on the substrate of a male's territory and the male guards them until they hatch. The eggs are hemispherical and covered with sticky threads that anchor them in the algae on the nesting sites. Their larvae are planktonic and they are live in shallow, nearshore waters.
