= Parastrigea =

Scientific classification
- Kingdom: Animalia
- Phylum: Platyhelminthes
- Class: Trematoda
- Order: Diplostomida
- Family: Strigeidae
- Genus: Parastrigea; Szidat, 1928

Genus of flukes

Parastrigea is a genus of trematodes in the family Strigeidae.

== Species ==
- Parastrigea brasiliana (Ukoli, 1967)
- Parastrigea buffoni Drago, Núñez & Lunaschi, 2018
- Parastrigea cincta Brandes, 1888
- Parastrigea diovadena Dubois & Macko, 1972
- Parastrigea plataleae Hernández-Mena, García-Prieto & García-Varela, 2014
