= Cotylurus =

Scientific classification
- Kingdom: Animalia
- Phylum: Platyhelminthes
- Class: Trematoda
- Order: Diplostomida
- Family: Strigeidae
- Genus: Cotylurus; Szidat, 1928

Genus of flatworms

Cotylurus is a genus of trematodes belonging to the family Strigeidae.

The species of this genus are found in Europe, Northern America and Australia.

Species:

- Cotylurus aquavis (Guberlet, 1922)
- Cotylurus brevis Dubois & Rausch, 1950
- Cotylurus cornutus (Rudolphi, 1809) Szidat, 1928
- Cotylurus flabelliformis (Faust, 1917)
- Cotylurus gallinulae Lutz, 1928
- Cotylurus hebraicus Dubois, 1934
- Cotylurus marcogliesei
- Cotylurus raabei (Bezubik, 1958)
- Cotylurus strigeoides Dubois, 1958
- Cotylurus syrius Dubois, 1934
- Cotylurus szidati Zazornova, 1991
