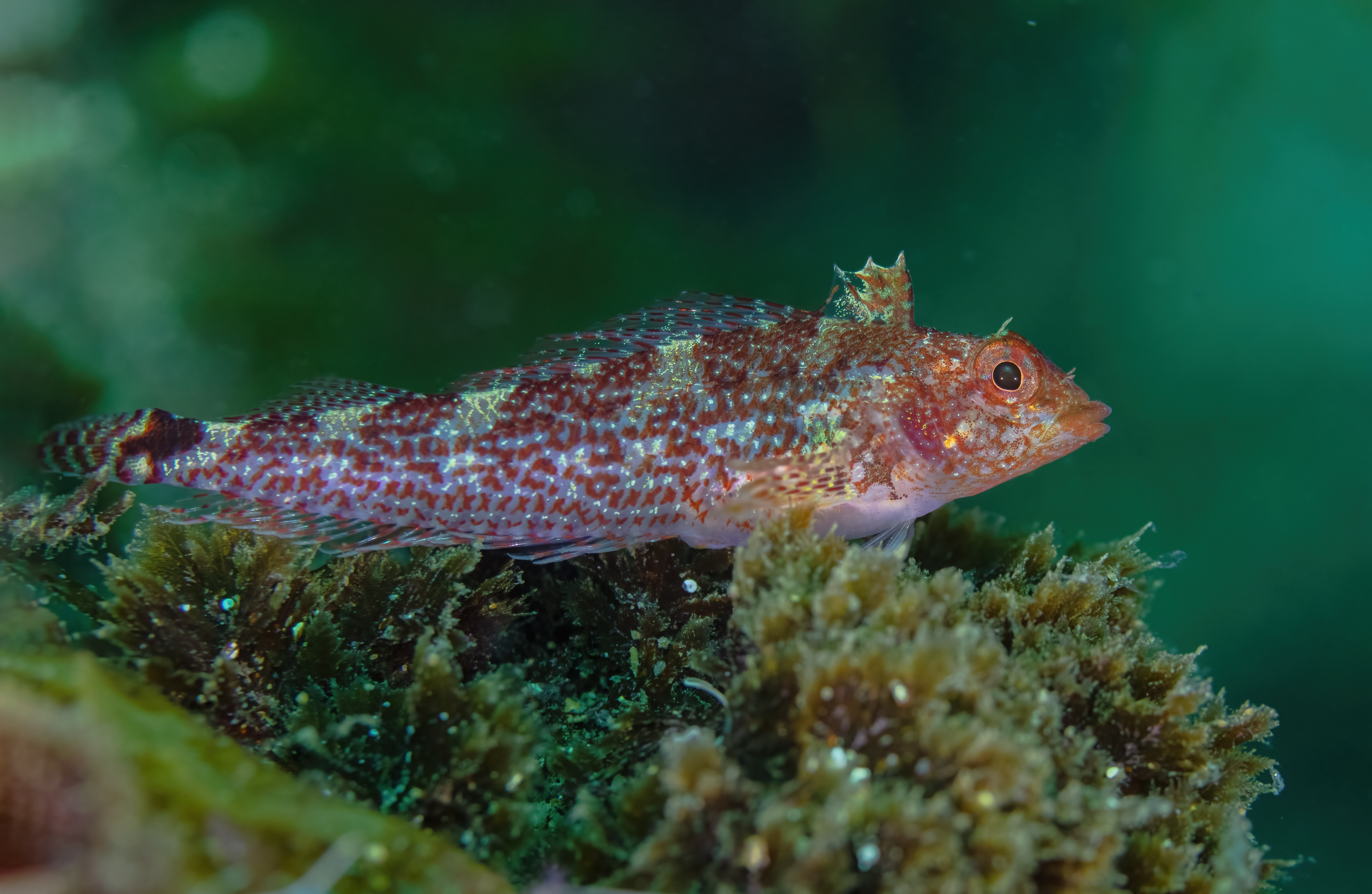
- Female
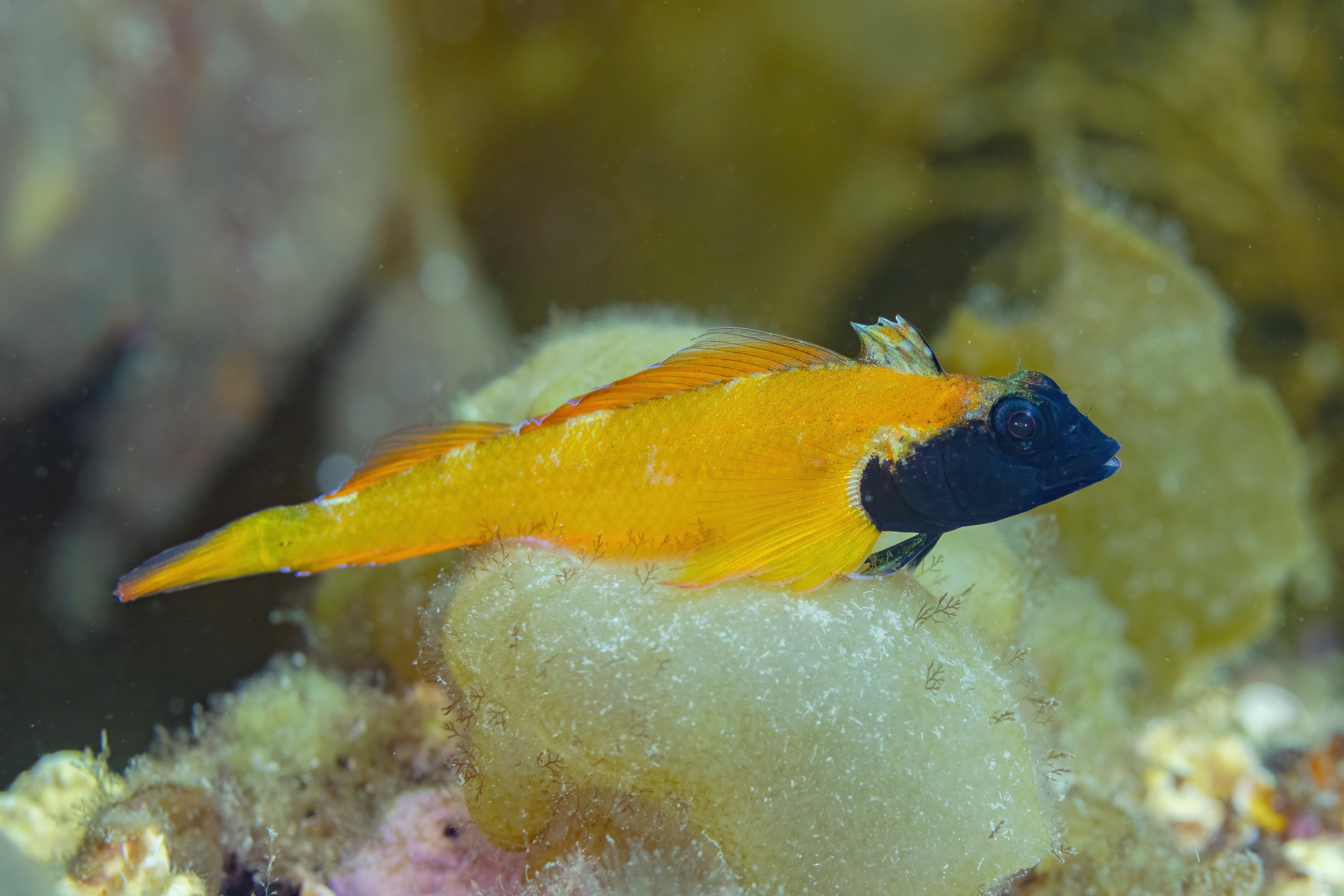
- (Territorial) Male

Conservation status
- Least Concern (IUCN 3.1)

Scientific classification
- Kingdom: Animalia
- Phylum: Chordata
- Class: Actinopterygii
- Division: Teleostei
- Order: Blenniiformes
- Family: Tripterygiidae
- Genus: Tripterygion
- Species: T. delaisi

Binomial name
- Tripterygion delaisi Cadenat & Blache, 1970

Synonyms
- Tripterygion atlanticus Wheeler & Dunne, 1975; Tripterygion xanthosoma Zander & Heymer, 1970

= Black-faced blenny =

Species of fish

The black-faced blenny (Tripterygion delaisi) is a small benthic fish from the family Tripterygiidae (triplefin-blennies). It occurs at depths of 3 to 40 metres (9.8 to 131.2 ft) and lives on the substrate under large rocks, cliffs or other overhangs.

== Physical appearance ==
Like all triplefin-blennies, T. delaisi has three dorsal fins and can hence easily be distinguished from members of the families Blenniidae (1 dorsal fin) and Gobiidae (2 dorsal fins) that have a similar lifestyle and general appearance. It has a peaked head and short tentacles above the eyes.

=== Colouration ===
The common name yellow black-faced blenny derives from the colouration of territorial males during the breeding season: their body becomes yellow and their head turns black; during a territorial fight the colouration of the head changes to a grey colour as a sign of aggression. Non-territorial males, females, and juveniles are cryptically coloured and are grey-brown with five dark and broad dorso-ventral bands between the head and the tail. Outside the breeding season, males and females can only be told apart with certainty by dissection.

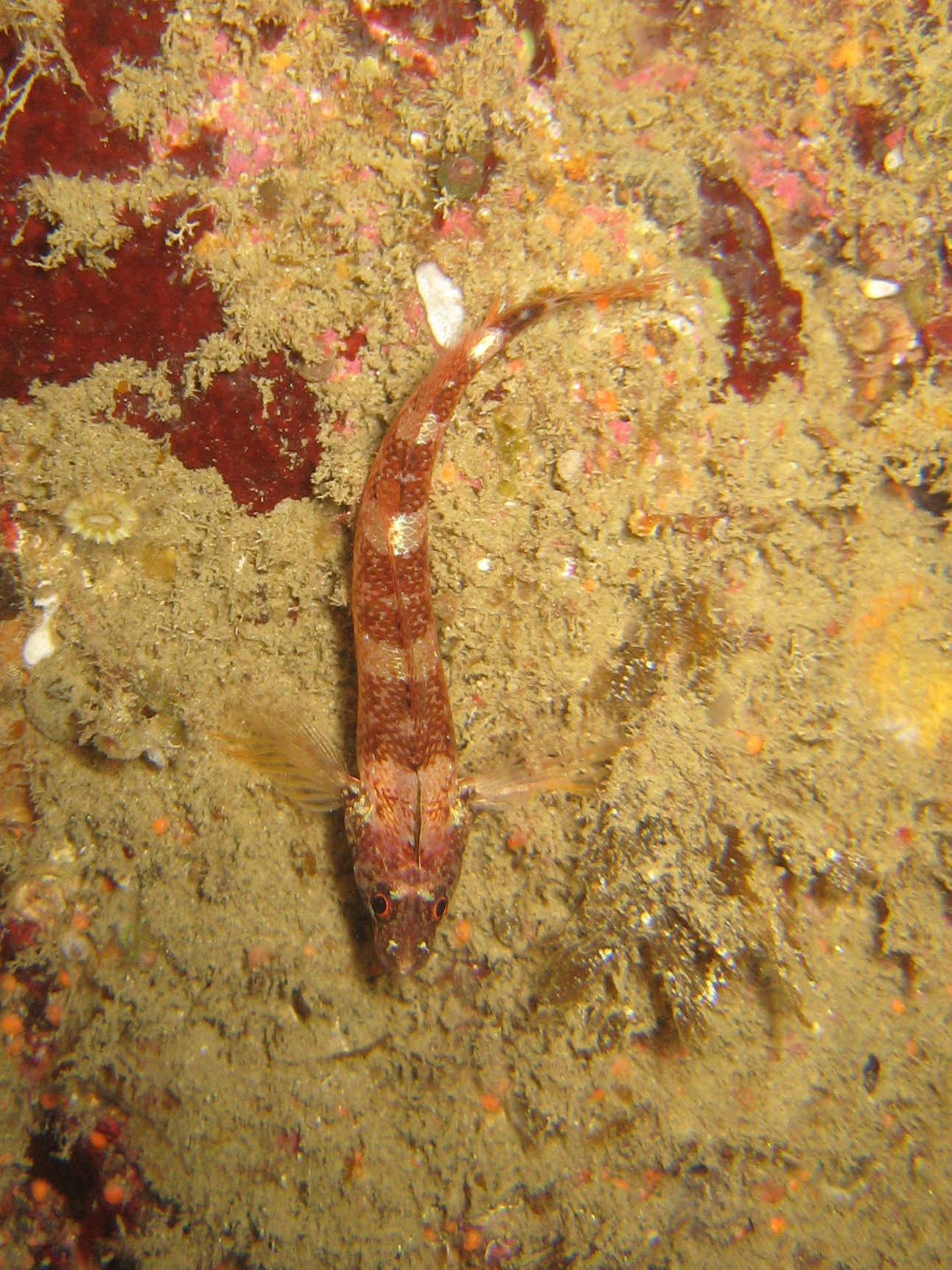
Female

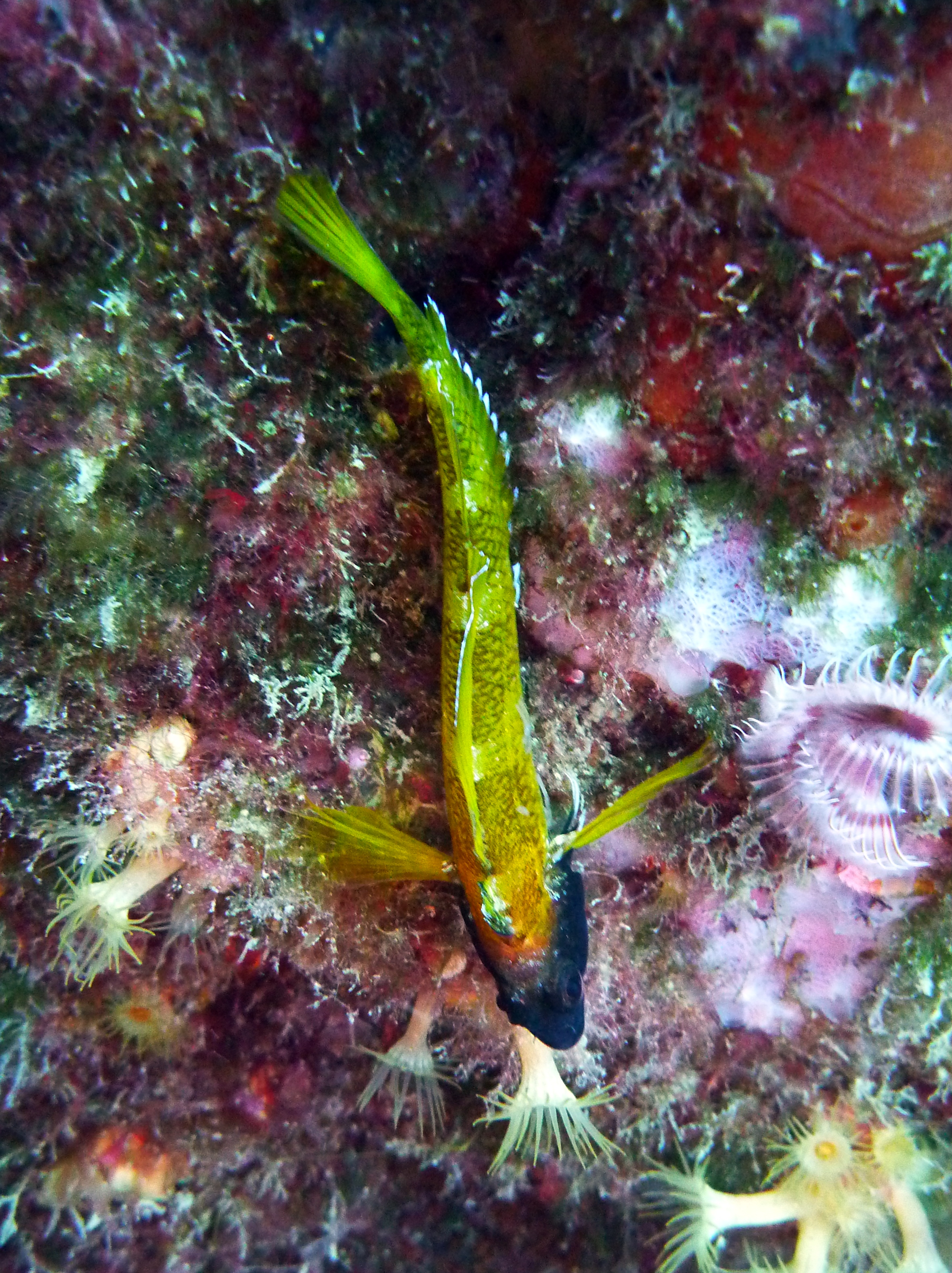

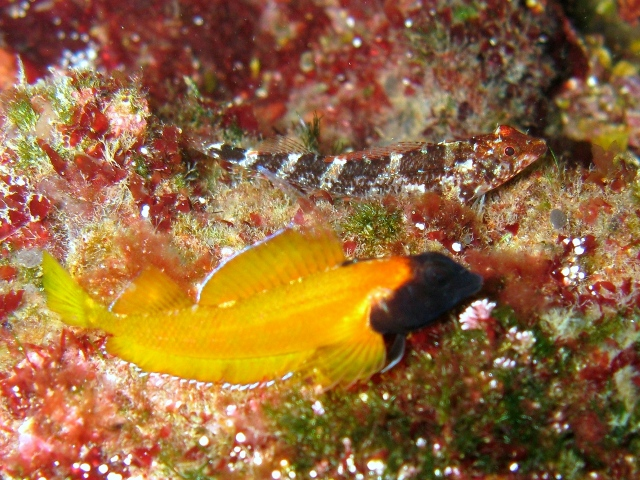
A cryptically coloured female yellow black-faced blenny (background) and a territorial male with black head and yellow body (foreground)

=== Body dimensions ===
The black-faced blenny can grow up to 8 centimetres (3.1 in) long. On average, territorial males (6.1 centimetres (2.4 in)) are slightly larger than non-territorial males (4.7 centimetres (1.9 in)) and females (5.0 centimetres (2.0 in)). Individuals caught in deeper water are generally larger than those captured in shallow waters.

=== Distinction from T. tripteronotus ===
Territorial males are distinctive and can hardly be confounded with any other species. Non-territorial males, females, and juveniles, are very similar in T. delaisi and Tripterygion tripteronotus. They can be told apart by a dark spot on the basis of the tail of T. delaisi, which is absent in T. tripteronotus. Additionally, the largest spine of the first dorsal fin is the first one in T. delaisi, whereas the 2nd spine is of equal length (in some individuals even larger) in T. tripteronotus.

=== Fluorescence ===
The iris of T. delaisi produces a fluorescent red signal. This signal is effected by guanine crystals in iridophores located in the stratum argentum, a reflective silvery, cellular layer external to the iris. These guanine crystals absorb a large part of the ambient light (400–580 nm, peak at 540 nm) and re-emit it at longer wavelengths with a peak emission of 600 nm (perceived as red by humans). On the posterior side of the stratum argentum lays a layer of melanophores with finger-like extensions that reach above the iridophore layer of the stratum argentum. The fish controls the brightness of its fluorescence through aggregation (brighter) and disaggregation (duller) of pigmented melanosomes in these finger-like expansions. The transport of the melanosomes is K⁺-dependent and thus likely to be neurally controlled. When stressed or inactive the fluorescence decreases in intensity, but gets brighter when foraging.

Additional to the fast change in brightness, a long-time adaptation to the light environment has been described for the fluorescence of T. delaisi: The fluorescence of animals caught at 20 metres (66 ft) is significantly more efficient than in animals caught at 5 metres (16 ft). Experiments have shown that this long-time adaptation is controlled by the ambient brightness and not by the ambient spectrum.

T. delaisi has three cone types in its retina: two single cones (maximal photon absorption at 481 nm and 500 nm respectively) and a double cone (maximal photon absorption at 518 and 531 nm). The absorption rate of the double cone overlaps with the fluorescence emission; T. delaisi is hence physiologically capable of detecting its own fluorescence. Behavioural experiments have shown that T. delaisi can distinguish between grey cues and cues matching the colour of its fluorescence and is therefore capable of perceiving its own fluorescence.

== Ecology and behaviour ==
=== Diet and feeding behaviour ===
T. delaisi is a carnivore that mainly feeds on small crustaceans, such as Harpacticoids, Tanaidaceans, Caprellidae, and Amphipods. It cannot bite pieces out of its prey and thus cannot eat prey larger than its mouth. Defecation takes 1 to 2 s.

Prior to the capture, T. delaisi looks at the prey item for several seconds; meanwhile the first dorsal fin rhythmically twitches about twice per second. The capture is achieved by a sudden inhaling movement, which sucks the prey into the mouth. If the prey is attached to the substrate, it is torn loose by a sideward movement of the head.

=== Locomotion and resting ===
Over large distances the locomotion of T. delaisi can be described as anguilliform: The propulsion is caused by wavy movements of tail and body. During this motion the pectoral fins are adducted and the 3rd dorsal fin and the caudal fin are spread.

Raising all dorsal fins precedes swimming over short distances. Repeated synchronous adduction of the pectoral fins thrusts the body forward and is aided by backwards- and downwards-movements of the pectoral fins. While swimming the dorsal fins are folded.

When resting, T. delaisi lifts up the anterior part of the body and leans on the lower edge of the pectoral and on the ventral fins. T. delaisi sleeps on unprotected substrate relaying entirely on its camouflage.

To scratch one of its sides, T. delaisi turns on that side and swims (using tailbeats for locomotion) to rub its body against the substrate. When yawning, it opens the mouth wide, spreads its operculum and lowers the floor of the buccal cavity while spreading the caudal and all dorsal fins.

=== Reproduction ===
Overall the territorial period of the males lasts from beginning of February until beginning of September, but the average duration of the territorial period per male was 47.1 days (in Corsica). Male T. delaisi show territorial behaviour for 2 consecutive years. Spawning takes place from mid of March until June.

The male territories are located on the lower side of overhanging cliffs and rocks and have a diameter of around 1 metre (3.3 ft). If two territories are visually hidden from each other their centres can be as close as 0.5 metres (20 in). Within the territory a smaller area of 20 by 20 centimetres (7.9 in × 7.9 in) is used for nesting. Male T. delaisi are able to find their territories from distances up to 200 m away.

==== Fights ====
During the reproductive season territorial males will defend their territory from intruders; this behaviour is not displayed outside the breeding season. The behaviour of a challenged territorial male varies with the size of the intruder: If the intruding male is smaller than the territory holder, the holder rams it to drive it away. If the intruder is almost as large as the territory holder, the territory holder swims in front of the intruder (both fish form the letter T) and the territory holder beats the intruder with its tail until the intruder retreats. If the intruder is as large or larger than the territory holder a fight might take place. The territory holder warns the intruder by raising its first dorsal fin. This gesture is succeeded by slowly moving the anterior part of the body up and down (further called rearing up) if the intruder does not retreat. The intruding male may respond with a rearing-up-motion itself. This initialises a fight: The territory holder, tail-beating and all dorsal fins spread, swims towards the intruder, where they move into either a parallel or an antiparallel position. Now, both fish use their tails to beat each other; in later stages of the fight they may also ram and bite each other. The fight is frequently interjected by short breaks, during which the animals sit on the ground and rear-up. In most described fights, the territory holder successfully defends its territory and the intruder retreats at some point.

Fights between females are rare, interspecific fights with closely related species (such as Tripterygion tripteronotus or Tripterygion melanurus) have not been described. If a spawning T. delaisi pair is disturbed by another territorial male, both spawning fish ram the intruder until it flees. When a female enters the territory of a male T. delaisi, that is not ready to spawn, the male drives the female away by ramming.

==== Spawning ====
Spawning is always initialised by females. They either move into the territory of a male and begin to spawn by themselves or react to a male performing courtship behaviour: When a male is ready to spawn but no female is close, it swims loops from the ground upwards; these loops are directed horizontally in absence of a female and towards an attracted female when the attraction behaviour is successful.

If undisturbed, a female spawns all mature eggs in one spawning session (thus, with the same male), and a male may fertilize up to 490 eggs a day. One complete spawning session lasts for 45–105 min and each egg is laid individually. Spawning consists of two phases per egg: In the first phase, the female wriggles its whole body while slowly swimming over the substrate, scanning it for suitable nesting sites with its genital papilla. Once it found a suitable place to spawn the wriggling movements increase in frequency and decrease in amplitude and the first dorsal fin is spread. The male, which has either been sitting on the substrate near the female or swimming circles around her during the first phase, then moves closer and both tremble when releasing their gametes. Once the egg is laid and fertilized, the male jumps away from the female, which repeats phase 1. To further stimulate the female, the male frequently swims in the shape of an 8 in front of the female. Spawning finishes when the female leaves the territory of the male or stops wriggling for more than 20 seconds, after which it is driven off by the male.

==== Parental care ====
The female leaves after spawning and only the male takes care of the eggs. Fanning fresh water at the eggs for increased oxygen supply, a widely distributed behaviour in most fish families, is not displayed by T. delaisi. Nevertheless, the male cleans the eggs by frequent plucking and defends them against predators. The main threat to T. delaisi eggs are blenniids, juvenile sparids, Crenilabrus species, crabs and sea urchins. Although some of these predators are much larger than the defending male, a nest is only rarely preyed upon when defended by a male; when removed all eggs are normally eaten within half an hour. Fish predators are bitten in their flanks and fins, crabs in their eye-stalks and successfully driven away. Although sea urchins are also attacked by T. delaisi males, they are the only threat a guarding male cannot defend his eggs against.

Dead eggs are removed by the male and usually eaten. If a dead egg is still attached to substrate it is carried away from the rest of the eggs and spat out. When accidentally plucking a hatching egg, the male swims upwards and spits the larva out, giving it a better chance of being carried away by the water currents.

==== Larval development ====
Larvae of T. delaisi hatch after approximately 19–20 days and live as plankton for several weeks before returning to a benthic lifestyle as post-larvae; the first post-larvae can already be found in July. The entire development takes place in nearshore-environments.

== Distribution and habitat ==
T. delaisi inhabits 2 disjunct areas: 1. the western Mediterranean Sea and adjacent parts of the Atlantic Oceans from north to the British Isles and south of Casablanca and Morocco, 2. western tropical Africa north to Senegal and the Macaronesian islands.

It lives at depths between 3 and 40 metres (120 and 1,570 in) but is most common at depths between 6 and 25 metres (20 and 82 ft). It prefers shaded, dark areas, such as shady rock faces, overhangs and crevices. In the Atlantic Ocean T. delaisi can be observed without cover even in shallow waters, but in the Mediterranean Sea it can only be seen without cover below depths of 10 metres (33 ft). This phenomenon can be explained through a lack of competition: In the Mediterranean Sea T. tripteronotus occurs in depth from 0 to 5 metres (0 to 16 ft) whereas in the Atlantic Ocean, where T. tripteronotus is absent, this niche is free to occupy.

The territorial males of T. tripteronotus and T. melanurus both have a red body with a black head, a signal that is strong in shallow waters where red light is still abundant, but becomes less and less striking with increasing depth due to the high absorption of long wavelengths in water. This might explain why T. delaisi only occurs below 5 metres (16 ft) in depth, whereas T. tripteronotus lives between 0 and 5 metres (0 and 16 ft): Males with a primarily red colouration can only successfully court for females where red light is present in the environment but in these shallow waters red is a stronger signal than yellow. Yellow males however, still exhibit a relatively striking colouration even at larger depths where they can successfully court for females.

== Phylogeny and evolution ==
=== Taxonomy ===
T. delaisi belongs in the genus Tripterygion in the family Tripterygiidae, which consists of four species: T. delaisi (Cadenat & Blache, 1970), T. melanurus (Guichenot, 1850), T. tartessicum (Carreras-Carbonell, Pascual & Macpherson, 2007) and T. tripteronotum (Risso, 1810). Besides T. delaisi, all species are endemic to the Mediterranean Sea. The species T. delaisi is subdivided in two subspecies: T. delaisi delaisi in the Mediterranean Sea and T. delaisi xanthosoma in the Atlantic Ocean. The subspecies can be distinguished by their courtship behaviour: T. delaisi delaisi court in free water and T. delaisi xanthosoma stay on the ground for courtship behaviour.

=== Speciation ===
The speciation process is still under discussion and several hypotheses have been proposed.

- Zander (1972) suggests that T. tripteronotus and T. delaisi evolved from two populations that were separated along the western African coast during the last glaciations — a cold-resistant population, northern population (ancestors of T. delaisi) and a warm-adapted southern population (ancestors of T. tripteronotus).
- Wirtz (1978, 1980) proposes that the current Tripterygion species are the ancestors from the last group of primarily African fish that invaded the Mediterranean Sea several times and were isolated in the Mediterranean Sea by a fluctuation of sea levels.
- De Jonge and Videler (1989) argue that the current Tripterygion species evolved either sym- or allopatrically inside the Mediterranean Sea.
- Geertjes et al. (2001) suggest that the speciation process started in the Pleistocene (2,588,000 to 11,700 years ago) and that T. melanurus and T. tripteronotus survived the glaciation. T. delaisi would then have diverged sympatrically from T. tripteronotus.
- Carreras-Carbonell, Macpherson and Pascual (2005) analysed five different genes and came to the conclusion that T. delaisi, T. melanurus, and T. tripteronotus rapidly diverged after the Messinian Salinity Crisis and have a trichotomic relationship.
- An analysis of several nuclear and mitochondrial genes has shown that there are two clades of T. delaisi with limited gene-flow: one on the eastern Atlantic islands and a second one in the Mediterranean and the Atlantic coasts of Europe. The time of coalescence of these clades is estimated to be 1.7 million years ago (i.e. more recent than the Pleistocene glaciations). The conclusion of this analysis is that the ancestors of Tripterygion colonized the Mediterranean Sea and the Atlantic Ocean from their western African home range.

=== Etymology ===
The species was described in 1970 by Jean Cadenat and Jacques Blache, from a type series collected at Gorée in Senegal by Michel Delais of Institut Fondamental d'Afrique Noire in Dakar, who is honoured in its specific name.
