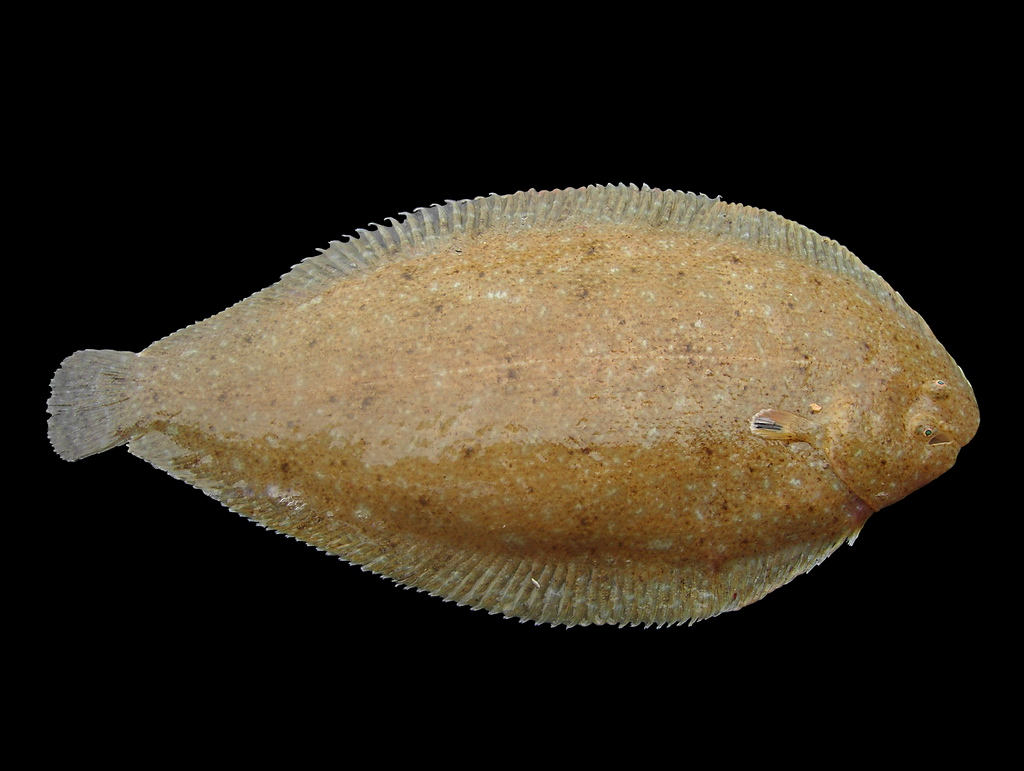
- Sand sole (P. lascaris)

Scientific classification
- Domain: Eukaryota
- Kingdom: Animalia
- Phylum: Chordata
- Class: Actinopterygii
- Order: Carangiformes
- Suborder: Pleuronectoidei
- Family: Soleidae
- Genus: Pegusa; Günther, 1862

Type species
- Solea aurantiaca as a synonym of Pegusa lascaris Günther 1862

= Pegusa =

Genus of fishes

Pegusa is a genus of soles native to the Eastern Atlantic Ocean, Mediterranean Sea, and Black Sea.

== Species ==
The currently recognized species in this genus are:

- Pegusa cadenati Chabanaud, 1954 (Cadenat's sole)
- Pegusa impar (E. T. Bennett, 1831) (Adriatic sole)
- Pegusa lascaris (A. Risso, 1810) (sand sole)
- Pegusa nasuta (Pallas, 1814) (blackhand sole)
- Pegusa triophthalma (Bleeker, 1863) (Cyclope sole)
