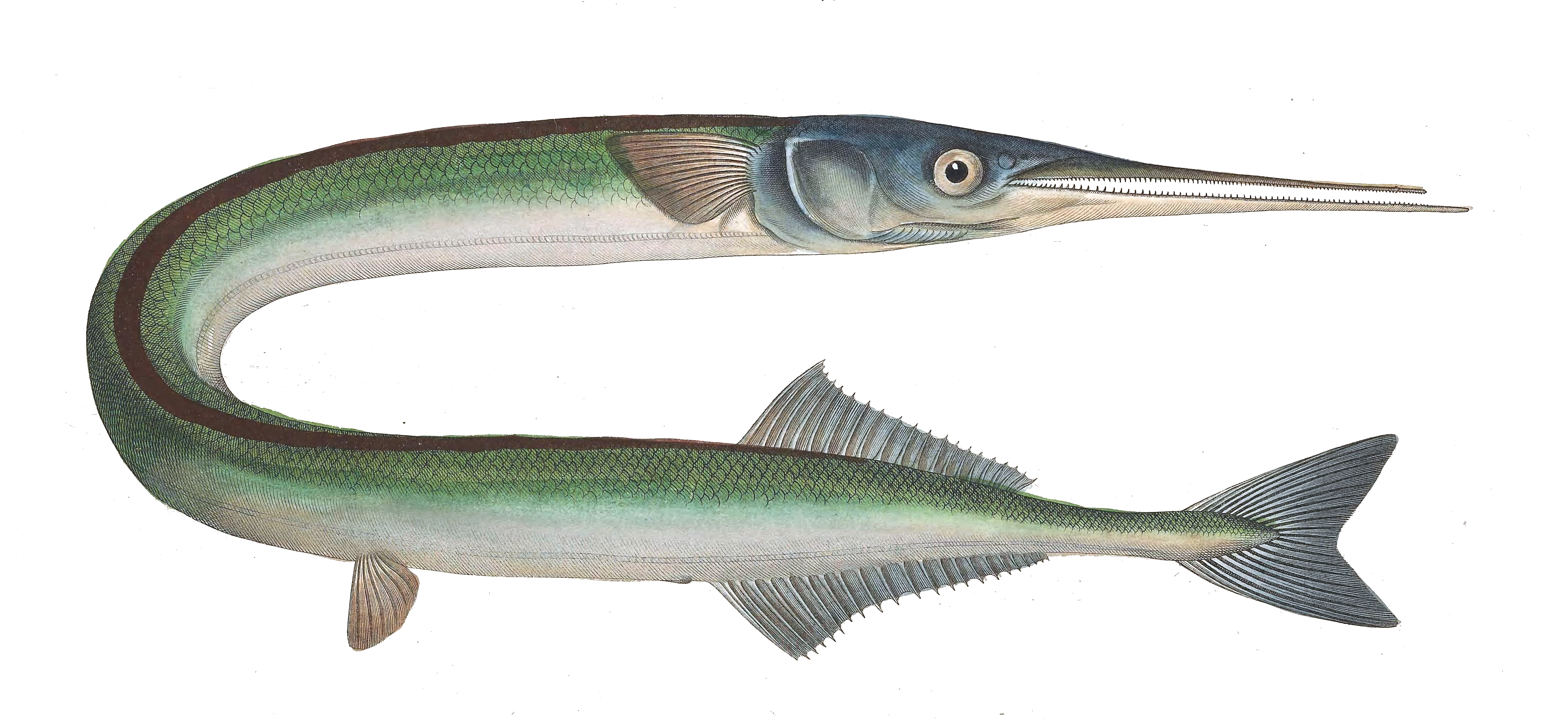

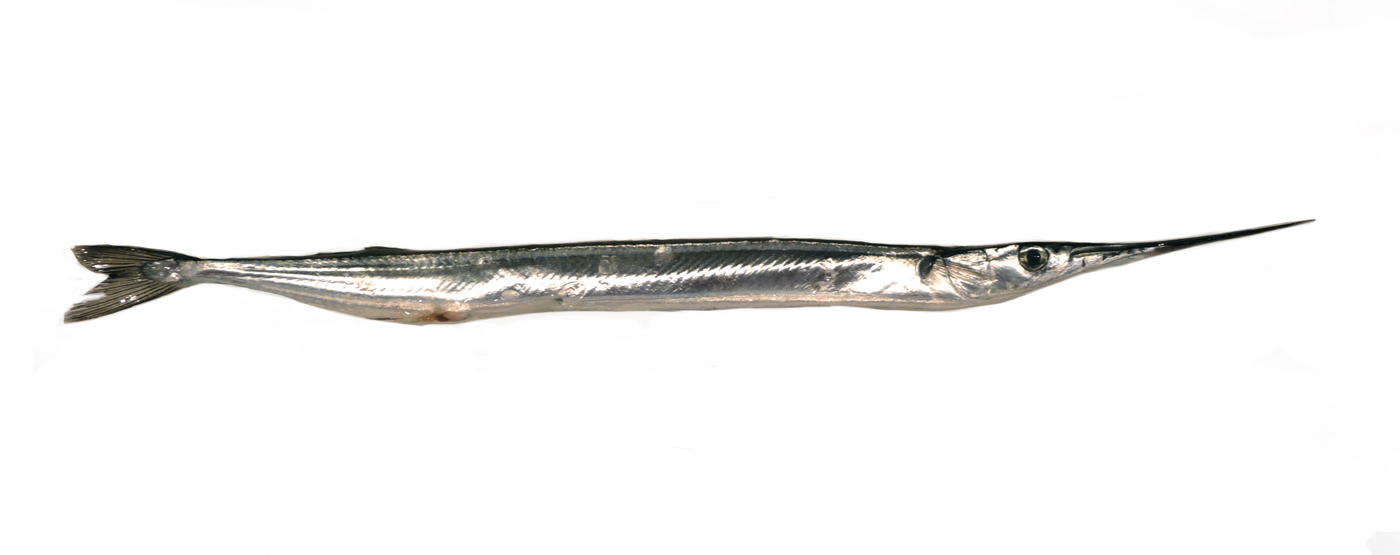

Scientific classification
- Kingdom: Animalia
- Phylum: Chordata
- Class: Actinopterygii
- Order: Beloniformes
- Family: Belonidae
- Genus: Belone; G. Cuvier, 1816

Type species
- Esox belone Linnaeus 1761

= Belone =

Belone Temporal range: mid-late Miocene to present

Genus of fishes

Belone is a genus of needlefish common in brackish and marine waters mainly found in the eastern Atlantic ocean to Mediterranean and Black Sea, as well. It is one of ten genera in the family Belonidae.

== Species ==
Three recognised species are in this genus:

- Belone belone (Linnaeus, 1761) (garfish)
- Belone euxini Günther, 1866
- Belone svetovidovi Collette & Parin, 1970 (short-beaked garfish)

The fossil species †Belone countermani de Sant'Anna, Collette & Godfrey, 2013 is known from the mid-late Miocene-aged St. Marys Formation of Maryland, US.

== Etymology ==
Georges Cuvier erected the genus by using the specific name of Linnaeus's Esox belone in tautonymy, the word belone is Greek for a needlefish and is thought to have originally referred to the greater pipefish.
