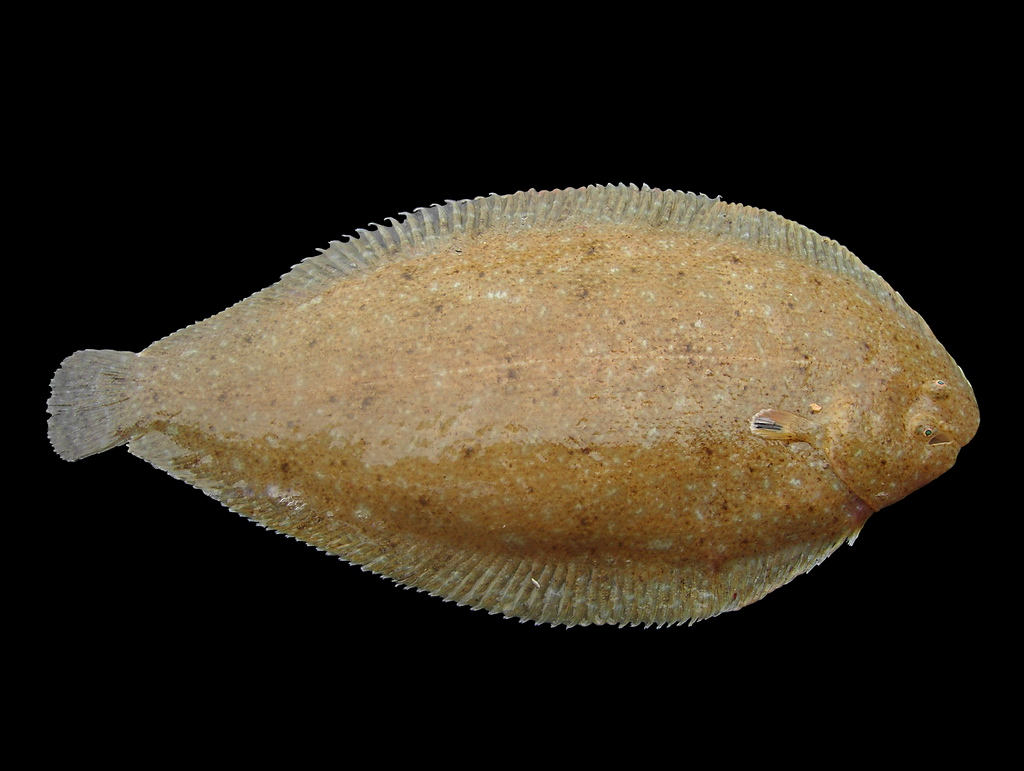

Conservation status
- Least Concern (IUCN 3.1)

Scientific classification
- Kingdom: Animalia
- Phylum: Chordata
- Class: Actinopterygii
- Division: Teleostei
- Order: Carangiformes
- Suborder: Pleuronectoidei
- Family: Soleidae
- Genus: Pegusa
- Species: P. lascaris

Binomial name
- Pegusa lascaris (Risso, 1810)

Synonyms
- Pleuronectes lascaris Risso, 1810; Solea lascaris (Risso, 1810); Solea scriba Valenciennes, 1837; Solea brasiliensis Kaup, 1858; Solea aurantiaca Günther, 1862; Solea auriantiaca Günther, 1862; Solea vermeuleni Metzelaar, 1919

= Sand sole =

Species of fish

The sand sole (Pegusa lascaris) is a fish species in the family Soleidae. It is a marine, subtropical, demersal fish up to 40 centimetres (16 in) long.

Widespread in the northeastern and southeastern Atlantic, to the Gulf of Guinea in the south, also in the Mediterranean Sea. Recorded in the Suez Canal. During a long time the soles from the Black Sea and Sea of Azov were erroneously identified as the Blackhand sole, which was considered as subspecies P. l. nasuta (now as a different species). The modern studies confirms the presence of the sand sole in this water basin.
