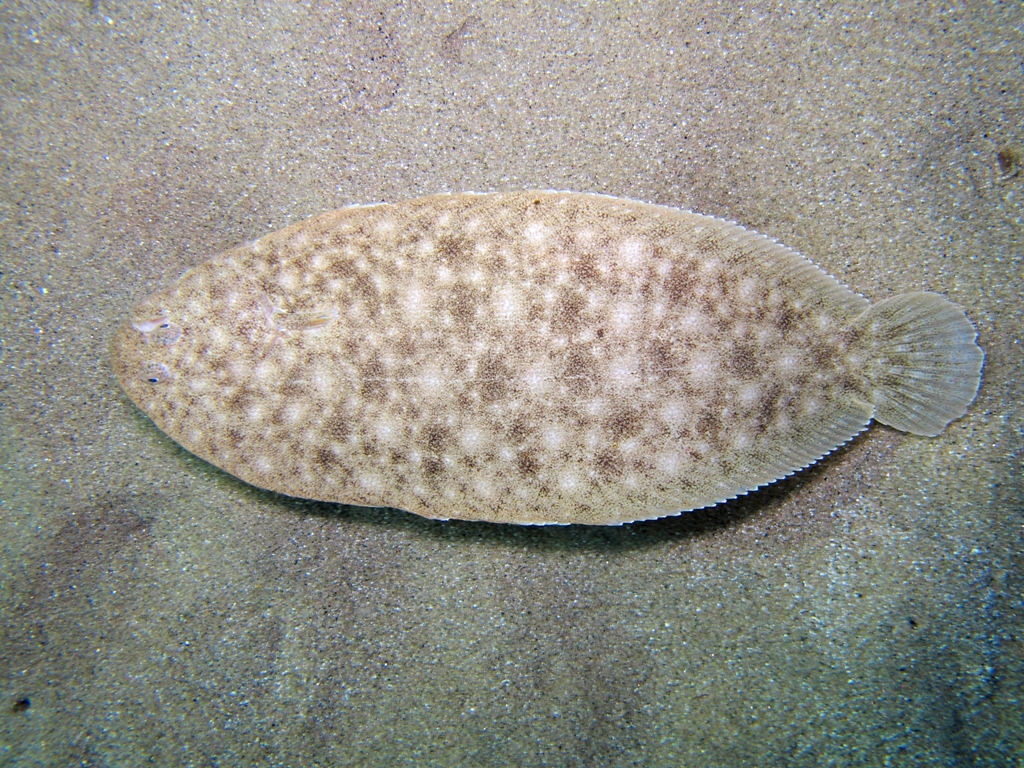

Scientific classification
- Kingdom: Animalia
- Phylum: Chordata
- Class: Actinopterygii
- Division: Teleostei
- Order: Carangiformes
- Suborder: Pleuronectoidei
- Family: Soleidae
- Genus: Pegusa
- Species: P. nasuta

Binomial name
- Pegusa nasuta (Pallas, 1814)

Synonyms
- Pleuronectes nasutus Pallas, 1814; Pegusa impar nasuta (Pallas, 1814); Solea lascaris nasuta (Pallas, 1814); Solea nasuta (Pallas, 1814); Solea bleekeri Boulenger, 1898

= Blackhand sole =

Species of fish

The blackhand sole (Pegusa nasuta) is a fish species in the family Soleidae, common in the Mediterranean Sea, the Black Sea, and the Sea of Azov. It was considered a subspecies of the sand sole in past, as Pegusa lascaris nasuta. Therefore, it is sometimes mistakenly mentioned for the Black Sea fauna as Pegusa lascaris. It is a marine, subtropical demersal fish, up to 17 cm long.
