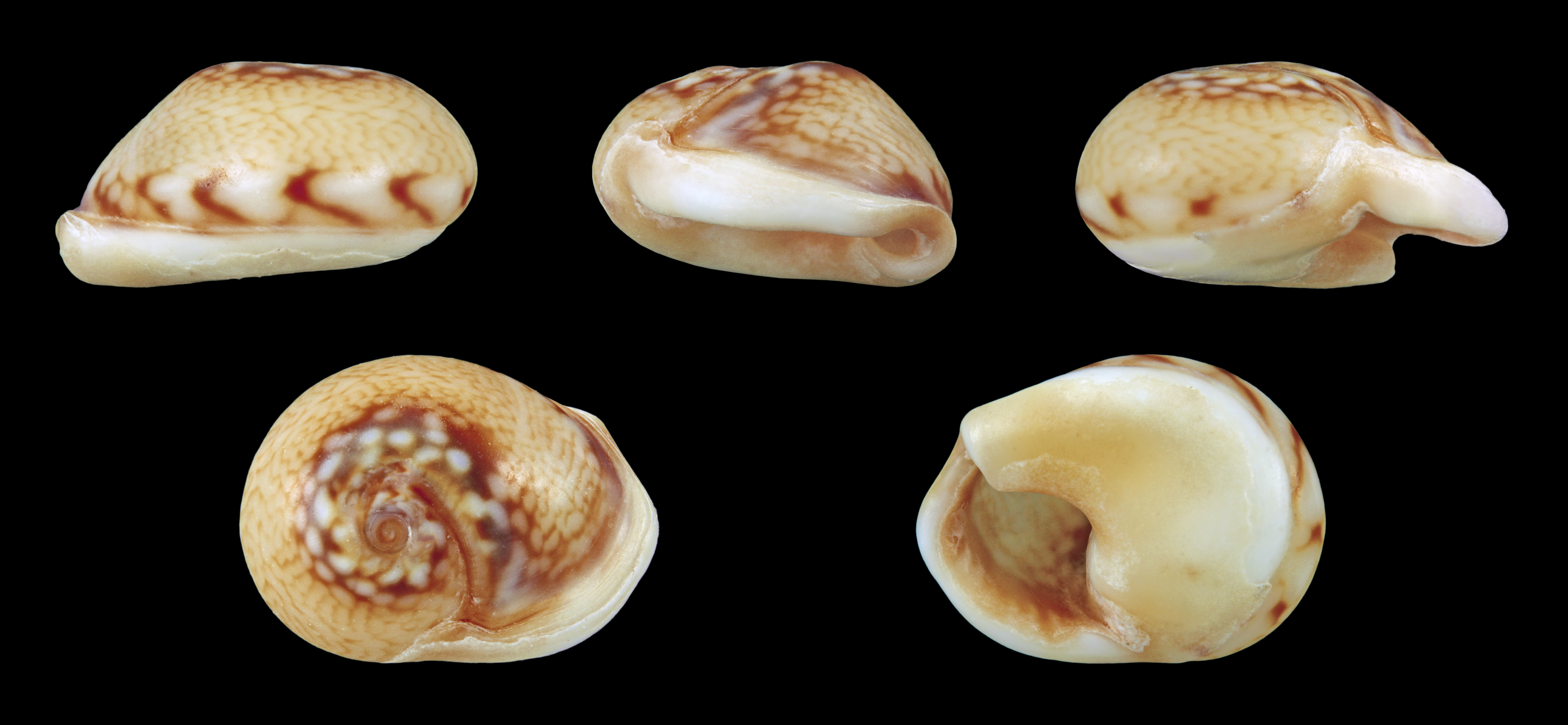

Scientific classification
- Kingdom: Animalia
- Phylum: Mollusca
- Class: Gastropoda
- Subclass: Caenogastropoda
- Order: Neogastropoda
- Family: Nassariidae
- Genus: Tritia
- Species: T. neritea

Binomial name
- Tritia neritea (Linnaeus, 1758)

Synonyms
- See list of synonyms

= Tritia neritea =

Species of gastropod

Tritia neritea is a species of sea snail, a marine gastropod mollusk in the family Nassariidae, the Nassa mud snails or dog whelks.

== Description ==
The length of the shell varies between 5 mm and 25 mm.

The hemispherical shell is smooth, depressed, convex above and flattened beneath. The blunt spire is formed of four indistinct whorls, entirely smooth. The aperture is ovate, reddish, rather small and obliquely emarginated. The outer lip is smooth and slightly margined. The columella is arcuated towards the middle, furnished with a wide, reddish, and almost circular callosity, which extends upon the body of the body whorl. The coloring is slightly variable, it is generally of a yellowish or reddish white, with brown lines, and two decurrent, interrupted, or articulated bands, one of which surrounds the suture, and the other only borders the circumference. The epidermis is thick and brown.

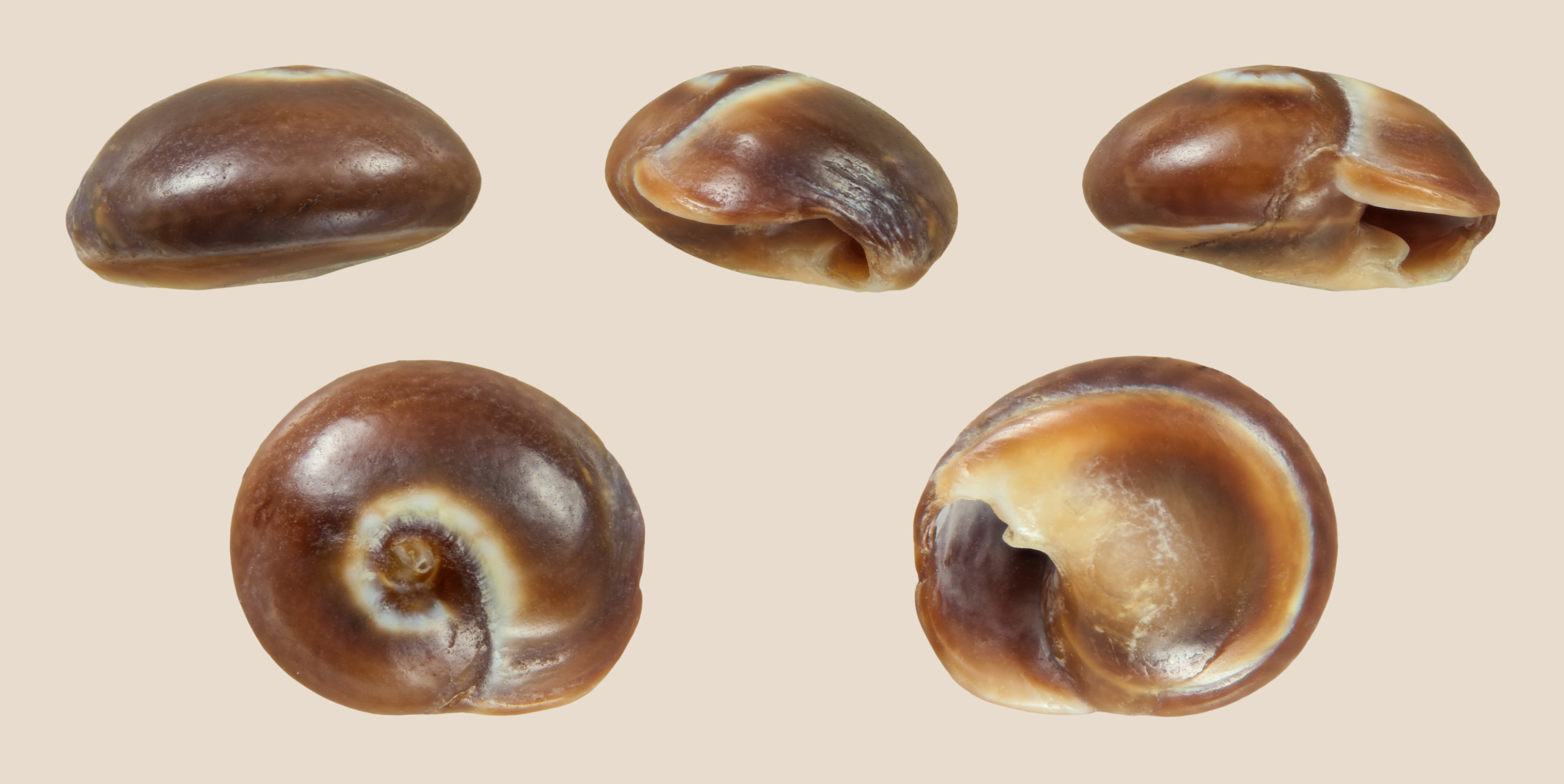
Tritia neritea var. atra

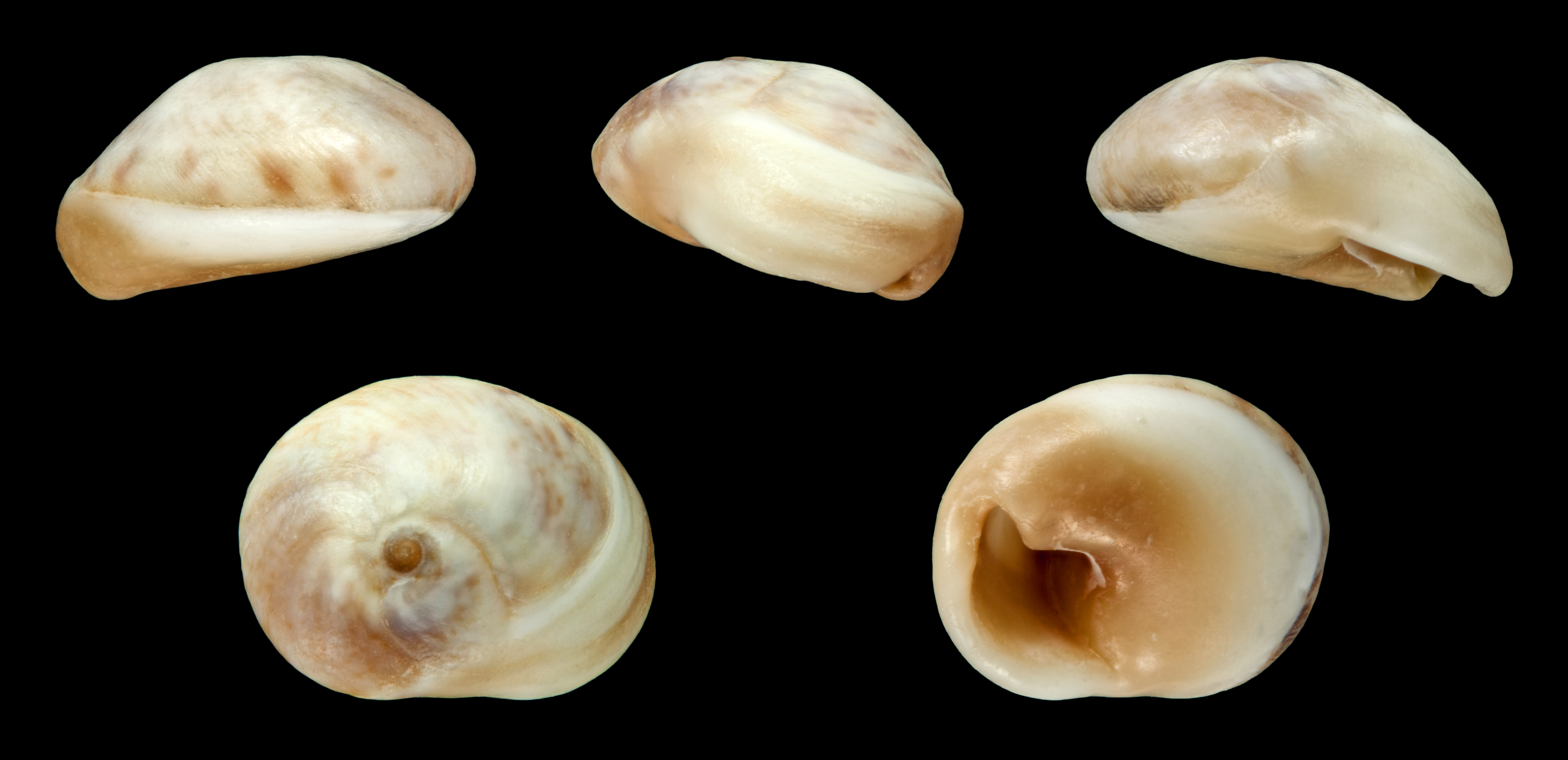
Tritia neritea var. kamiesch

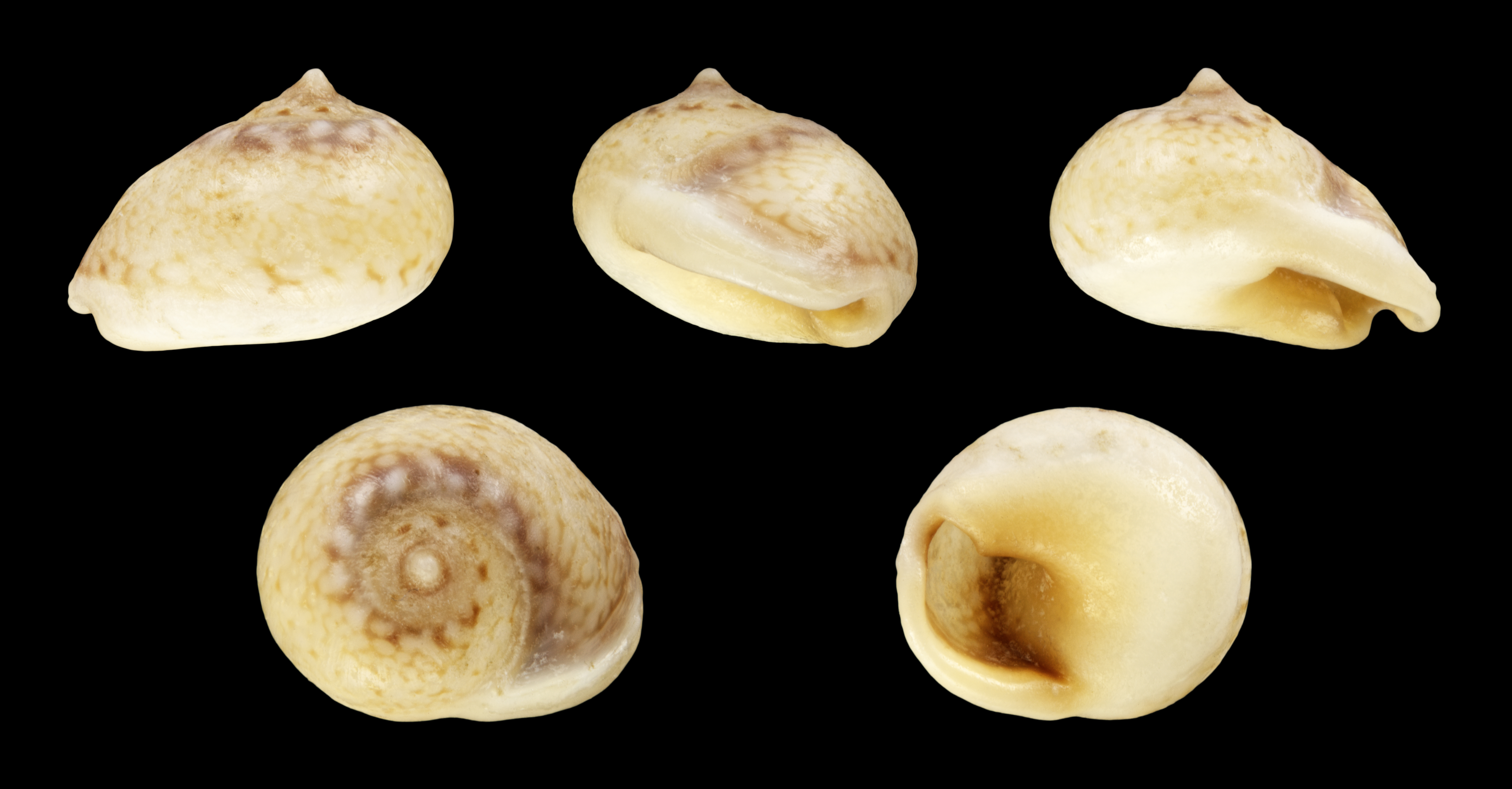
Tritia neritea westerlundi

== Distribution ==
This species occurs in the Mediterranean Sea and in the Black Sea.

== List of synonyms ==
List of synonyms of Tritia neritea
- Buccinum neriteum Linnaeus, 1758 (original combination)
- Cyclonassa carinata Coen, 1933
- Cyclonassa diluta Coen, 1937
- Cyclonassa fasciata Coen, 1933
- Cyclonassa kamischiensis [sic] (misspelling of Cyclope kamiesch (Chenu, 1859))
- Cyclonassa kamischiensis var. atra Milaschewitsch, 1916
- Cyclonassa kamischiensis var. exigua Milaschewitsch, 1916
- Cyclonassa neritea (Linnaeus, 1758)
- Cyclonassa neritea var. callosa Pallary, 1912
- Cyclonassa neritea var. compacta Pallary, 1919
- Cyclonassa neritea var. depressa Pallary, 1919
- Cyclonassa neritea var. elongata Pallary, 1919
- Cyclonassa neritea var. globulosa Pallary, 1919
- Cyclonassa neritea var. inflata Pallary, 1919
- Cyclonassa neritea var. kamieschensis Pallary, 1919 (unjustified emendation of Cyclops kamiesch Chenu)
- Cyclonassa neritea var. kamieschensis communis Pallary, 1919
- Cyclonassa neritea var. kamieschensis discoidea Pallary, 1919
- Cyclonassa neritea var. kamieschensis gibba Pallary, 1919
- Cyclonassa neritea var. kamieschensis lactescens Pallary, 1919
- Cyclonassa neritea var. minuta Pallary, 1919
- Cyclonassa neritea var. mucronata Pallary, 1919
- Cyclonassa neritea var. platystoma Pallary, 1919
- Cyclonassa vayssierei Pallary, 1903
- Cyclonassa vernicata Coen, 1933
- Cyclope neritea (Linnaeus, 1758)
- Cyclope neritoidea Risso, 1826 (Unnecessary substitute name for Buccinum neriteum Linnaeus, 1758)
- Cyclope tarentina Parenzan, 1970
- Cyclope westerlundi Brusina, 1900
- Cyclops asterizans de Montfort, 1810
- Cyclops kamiesch Chenu, 1859
- Nana neritea (Linnaeus, 1758)
- Nanina unifasciata Risso, 1826
- Nassa inflata Locard & Caziot, 1900
- Nassa italica Issel, 1870
- Nassa minor Weinkauff, 1868
- Nassa neritea (Linnaeus, 1758) (unaccepted generic combination)
- Nassa neritea var. albida Requien, 1848
- Nassa neritea var. lutescens Requien, 1848
- Nassa neritea var. major Requien, 1848
- Nassa neritea var. media Requien, 1848
- Nassa neritea var. minima Requien, 1848
- Nassa neritoides Lamarck, 1816
- Nassa unifasciata Paolucci, 1871
- Neritula nana Locard, 1887
- Neritula nana var. mucronata Locard, 1887
- Tritia westerlundi (Brusina, 1900)
