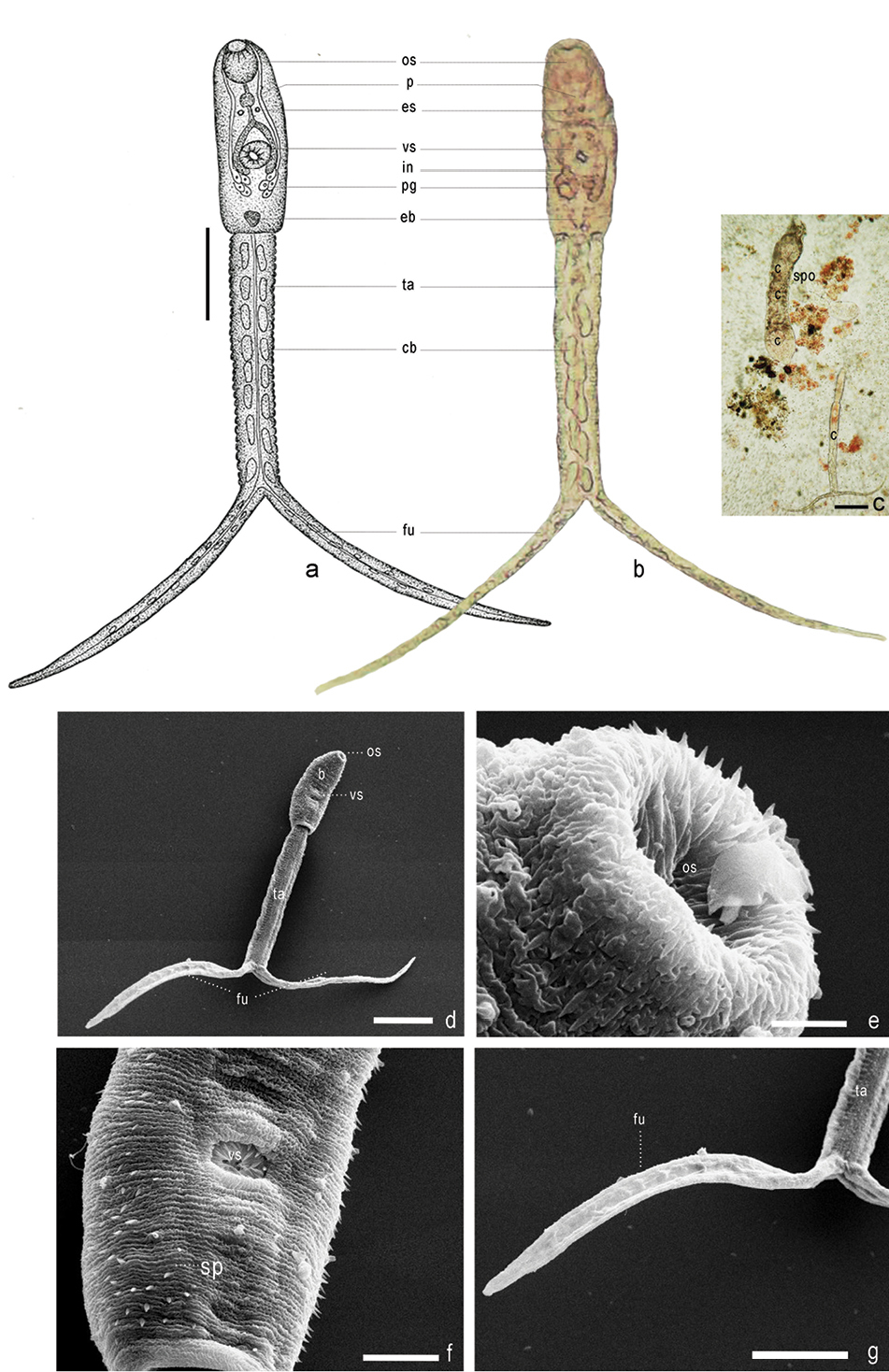
- Apatemon gracilis

Scientific classification
- Kingdom: Animalia
- Phylum: Platyhelminthes
- Class: Trematoda
- Order: Diplostomida
- Family: Strigeidae
- Genus: Apatemon; Szidat, 1928

= Apatemon =

Genus of flatworms

Apatemon is a genus of flatworms belonging to the family Strigeidae.

The genus was first described by Szidat in 1928.

The genus has cosmopolitan distribution.

Species:

- Apatemon gracilis (Rudolphi, 1819) Szidat, 1928
- Apatemon annuligerum (von Nordmann, 1832) Odening, 1970
- Apatemon barbusi Zhokhov, Miretskaya, Pugacheva & Tessema, 2008
- Apatemon cobitidis (von Linstow, 1890) Vojtek, 1964
- Apatemon fuligulae Yamaguti, 1933
- Apatemon hypseleotris Negm-Eldin & Davies, 2002
- Apatemon jamiesoni Presswell., 2022
- Apatemon pellucidus Yamaguti, 1933
- Apatemon somateriae Dubois, 1948
- Apatemon tilapiae Zhokhov, Miretskaya, Pugacheva & Tessema, 2008
