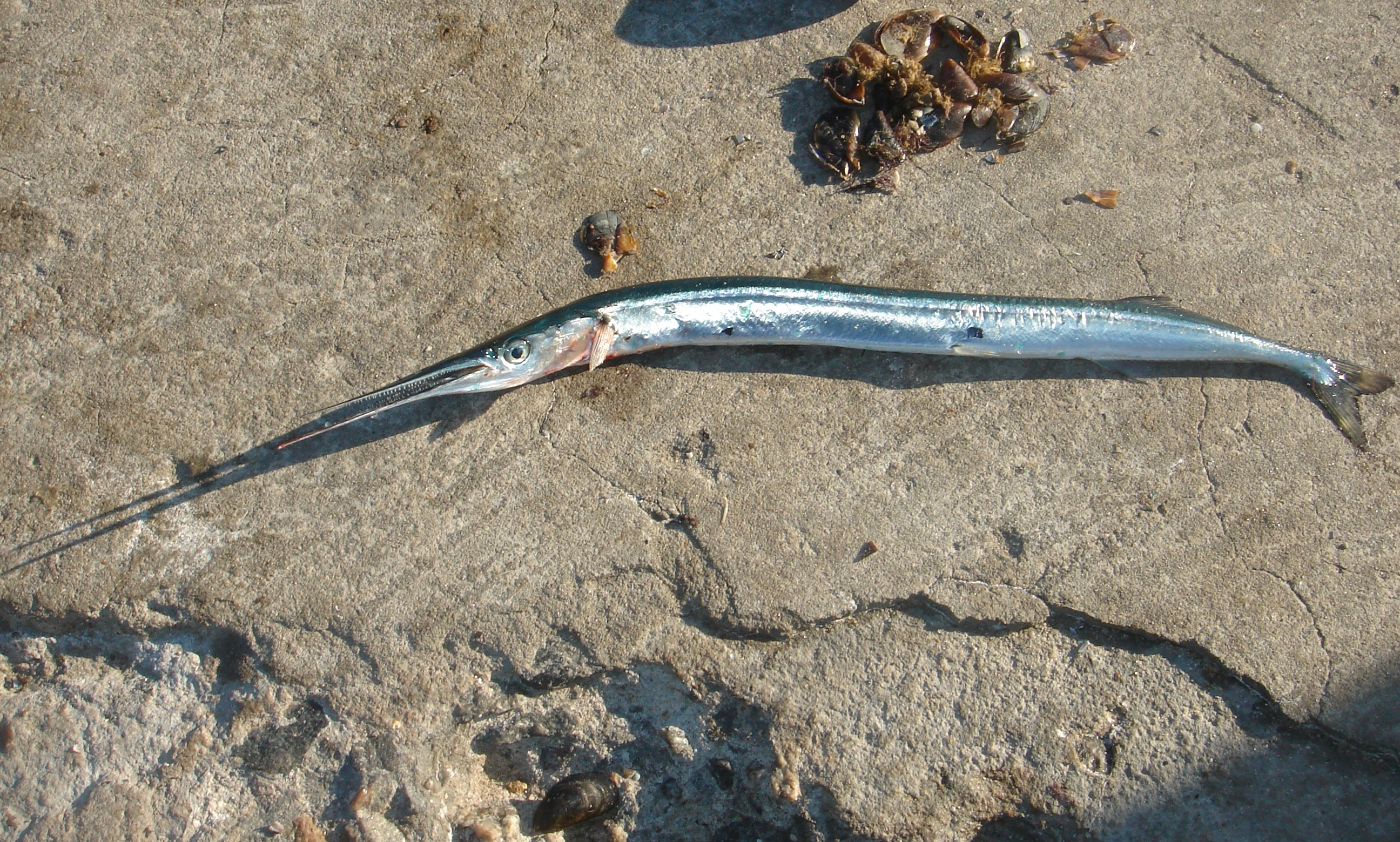

Scientific classification
- Domain: Eukaryota
- Kingdom: Animalia
- Phylum: Chordata
- Class: Actinopterygii
- Order: Beloniformes
- Family: Belonidae
- Genus: Belone
- Species: B. euxini

Binomial name
- Belone euxini Günther, 1866

Synonyms
- Belone belone euxini Günther, 1866

= Belone euxini =

Species of fish

Belone euxini is a species of needlefish which is endemic to the Black Sea, Sea of Azov and Sea of Marmara. Many authorities treat this taxon as a subspecies of Belone belone.
