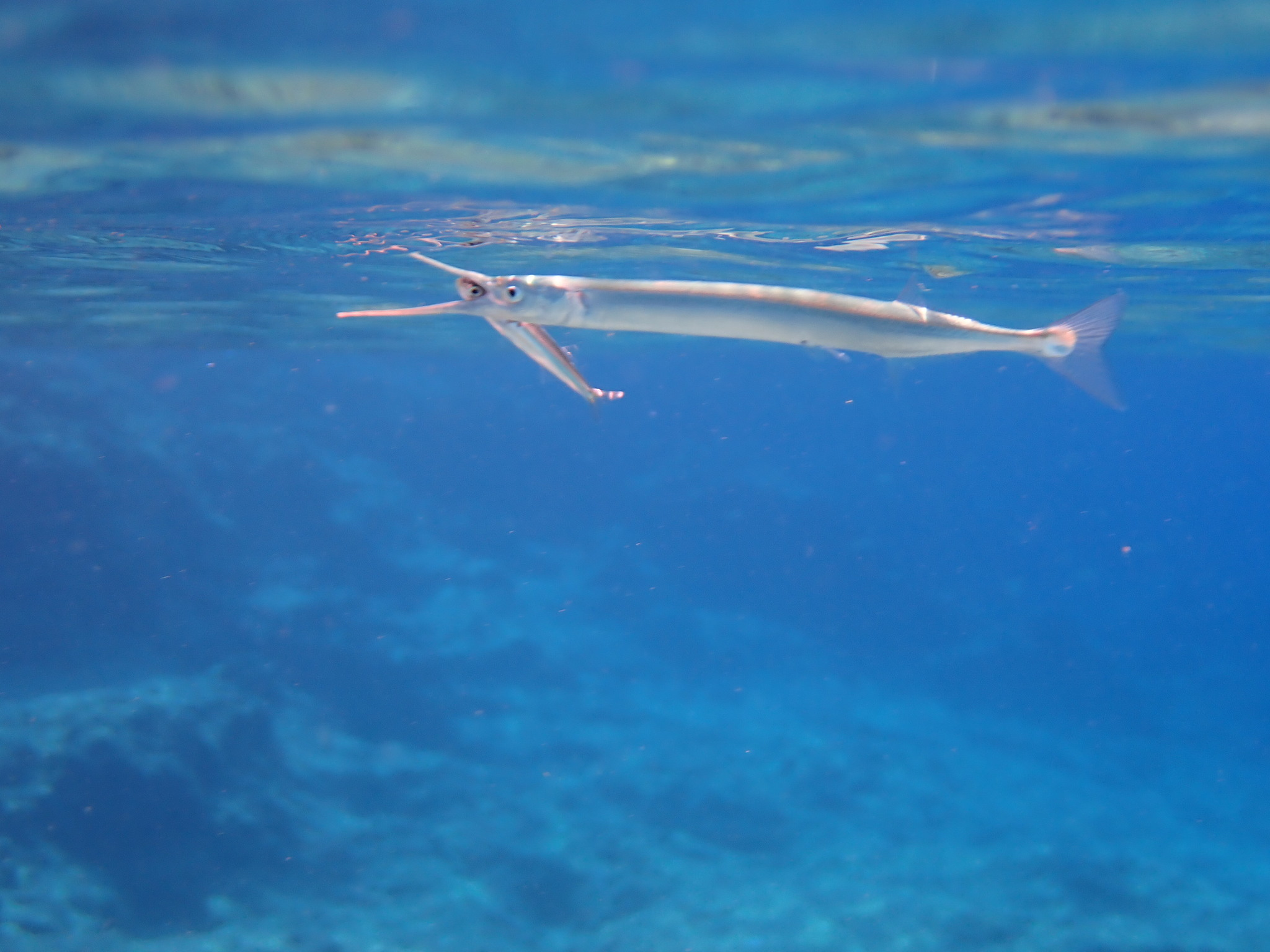
- Feeding, in Greece
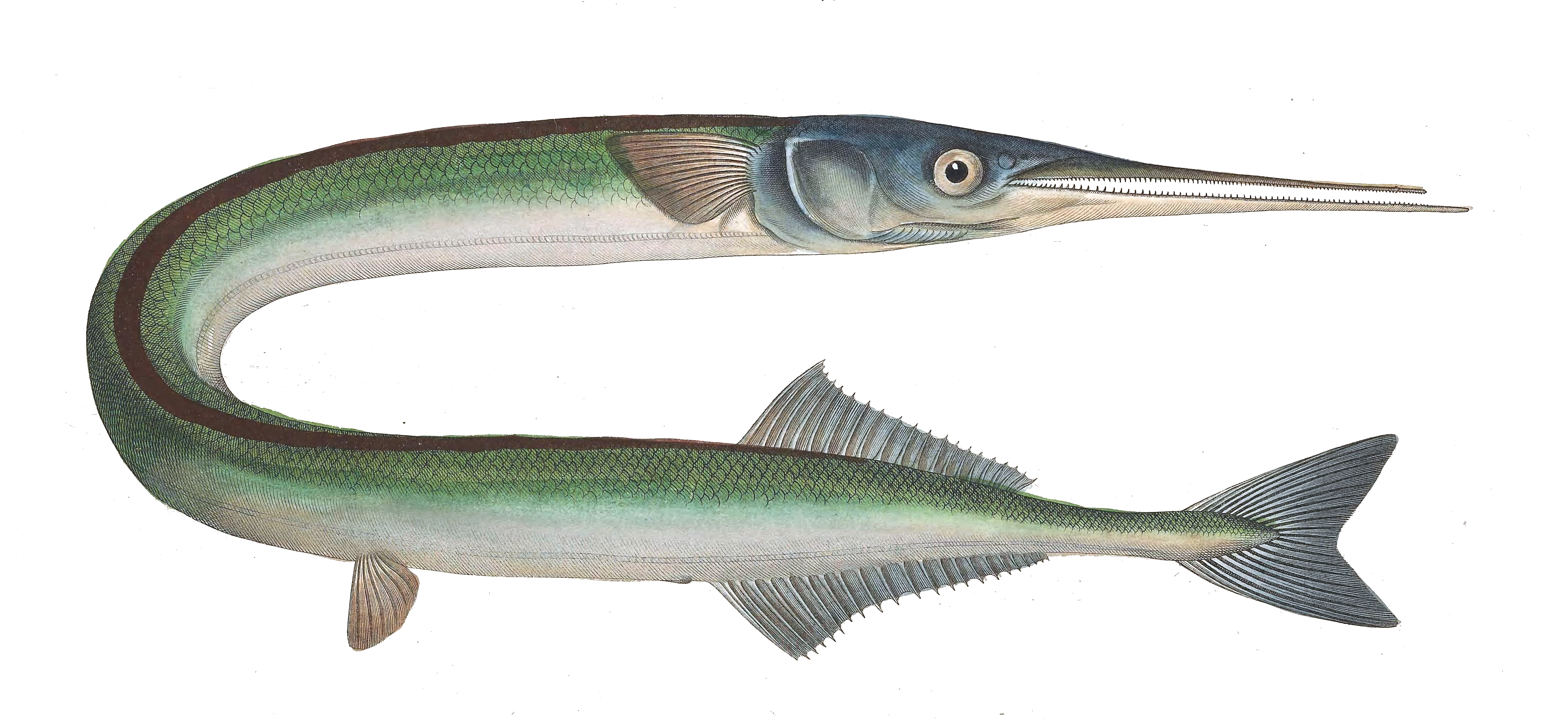
- 1795-1797 illustration

Conservation status
- Least Concern (IUCN 3.1)

Scientific classification
- Kingdom: Animalia
- Phylum: Chordata
- Class: Actinopterygii
- Division: Teleostei
- Order: Beloniformes
- Family: Belonidae
- Genus: Belone
- Species: B. belone

Binomial name
- Belone belone (Linnaeus, 1761)
- The range of the garfish

Synonyms
- List: Esox belone Linnaeus, 1761; Belone belone belone (Linnaeus, 1761); Belone bellone (Linnaeus, 1761); Belone longirostris Schinz, 1822; Belone acus Risso, 1827; Belone vulgaris Fleming, 1828; Belone rostrata Faber, 1829; Hemiramphus europaeus Yarrell, 1837; Belone gracilis Lowe, 1839; Belone belone gracilis Lowe, 1839; Hemiramphus balticus Hohnbaum-Hornschuch, 1843; Hemiramphus behnii Hohnbaum-Hornschuch, 1843; Belone vulgaris Valenciennes, 1846; Belone undecimradiata Budge, 1848; Hemiramphus obtusus Couch, 1848; Macrognathus scolopax Gronow, 1854; Belone euxini Günther, 1866; Belone belone euxini Günther, 1866; Belone cornidii Günther, 1866; Belone linnei Malm, 1877

= Garfish =

Species of fish

The garfish (Belone belone), also known as the garpike, needlefish or sea needle, is a pelagic, oceanodromous needlefish found in brackish and marine waters of the Atlantic Ocean and the Mediterranean, Caribbean, Black, and Baltic Seas.

== Description ==
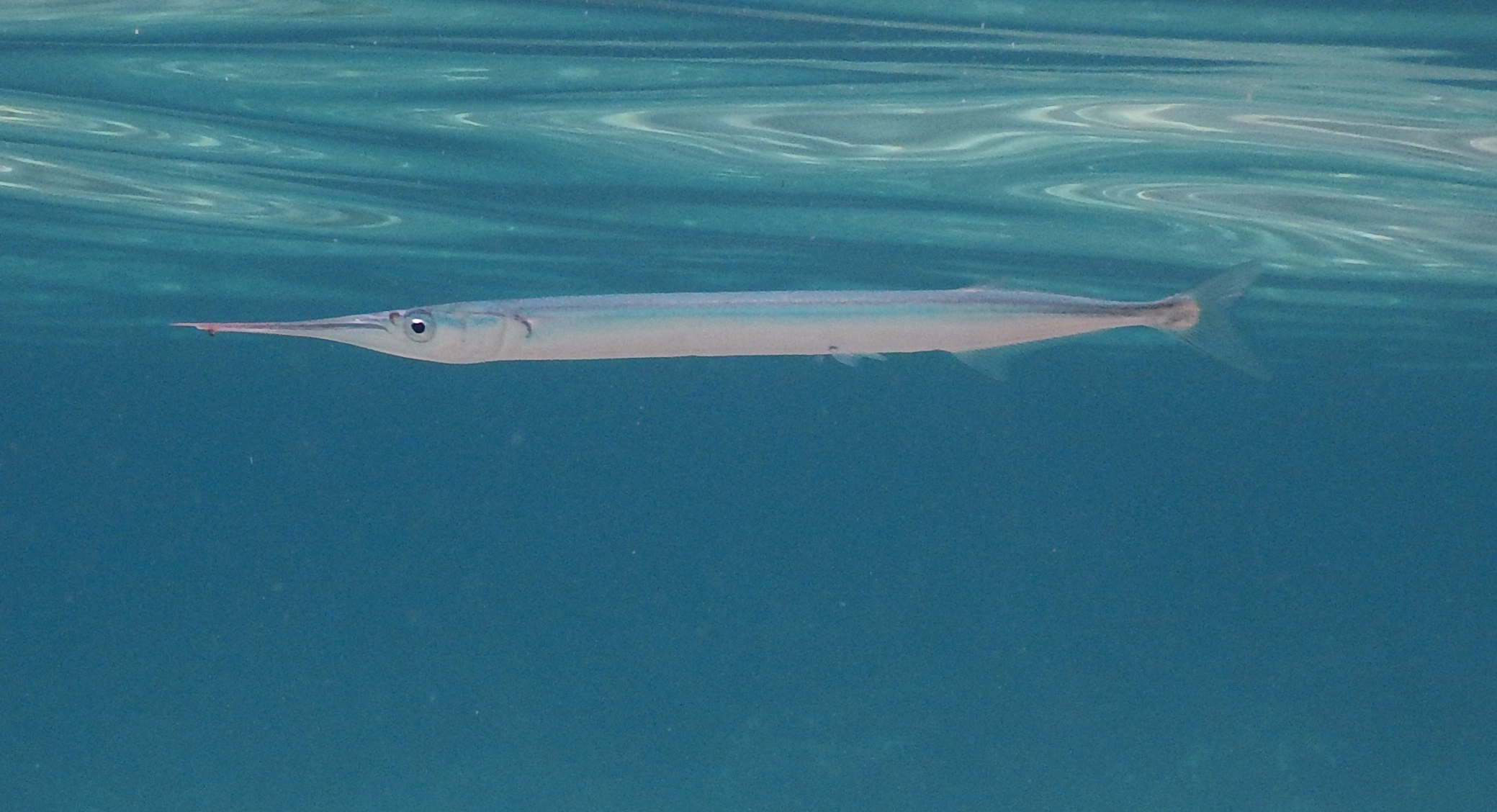
In Sardinia

The garfish is a long and slender fish with a laterally compressed body, and grows to about 50 to 75 cm (20 to 30 in) in length. The jaws are elongated and armed with sharp teeth. The pectoral, dorsal, and anal fins are situated well back on the body and the latter two are similar in appearance. Positioning the fins so far back gives greater flexibility to the body. The lateral line is set low on the flanks. The colour of the body is bluish green with a silvery grey belly and the bones are green.

== Behaviour ==
Garfish are pelagic fish which live close to the water surface. They eat small fish and have a migratory pattern similar to that of the mackerel, arriving a short time before the latter to spawn. Their association with mackerel has led to some older common names such as "mackerel guide" and "mackerel guardian".

They move into shallow waters in April and May and spawn in areas with eelgrass in May and June. In the autumn, they return to the open sea, including the Atlantic west of Ireland and Great Britain. Garfish are oviparous and the eggs are often found attached to objects in the water by tendrils on the egg's surface. Spawning occurs in May and June among seagrass beds with the long sticky tendrils on the chorion adhering to the blades of the sea grasses. The juveniles remain in shallower waters until such time as they attain sexual maturity.

The garfish is a predator which hunts in the open sea seeking out shoals of small fish, such as Atlantic herring, sprats, sand eels, and even three-spined sticklebacks. They also feed on free-swimming crustaceans. They frequently forage near to the shore and will hunt in and around natural or manmade features which interrupt tidal flows.

== Subspecies ==
The following subspecies of Belone belone have been recognised:

- Belone belone belone (Linnaeus, 1761) in the Northeast Atlantic Ocean
- Belone belone euxini Günther, 1866 in the Black Sea and the Sea of Azov
- Belone belone acus Risso, 1827 in the Mediterranean Sea and adjacent parts of Atlantic Ocean, Madeira, Canary Islands, Azores, and south to Cape Verde
- Belone belone gracilis Lowe, 1839 from France to the Canary Islands including the Mediterranean

B. b. euxini is treated as a valid species Belone euxini by FishBase while other authorities treat B. b. acus as the species Belone acus, which is synonymous with B. b. gracilis.

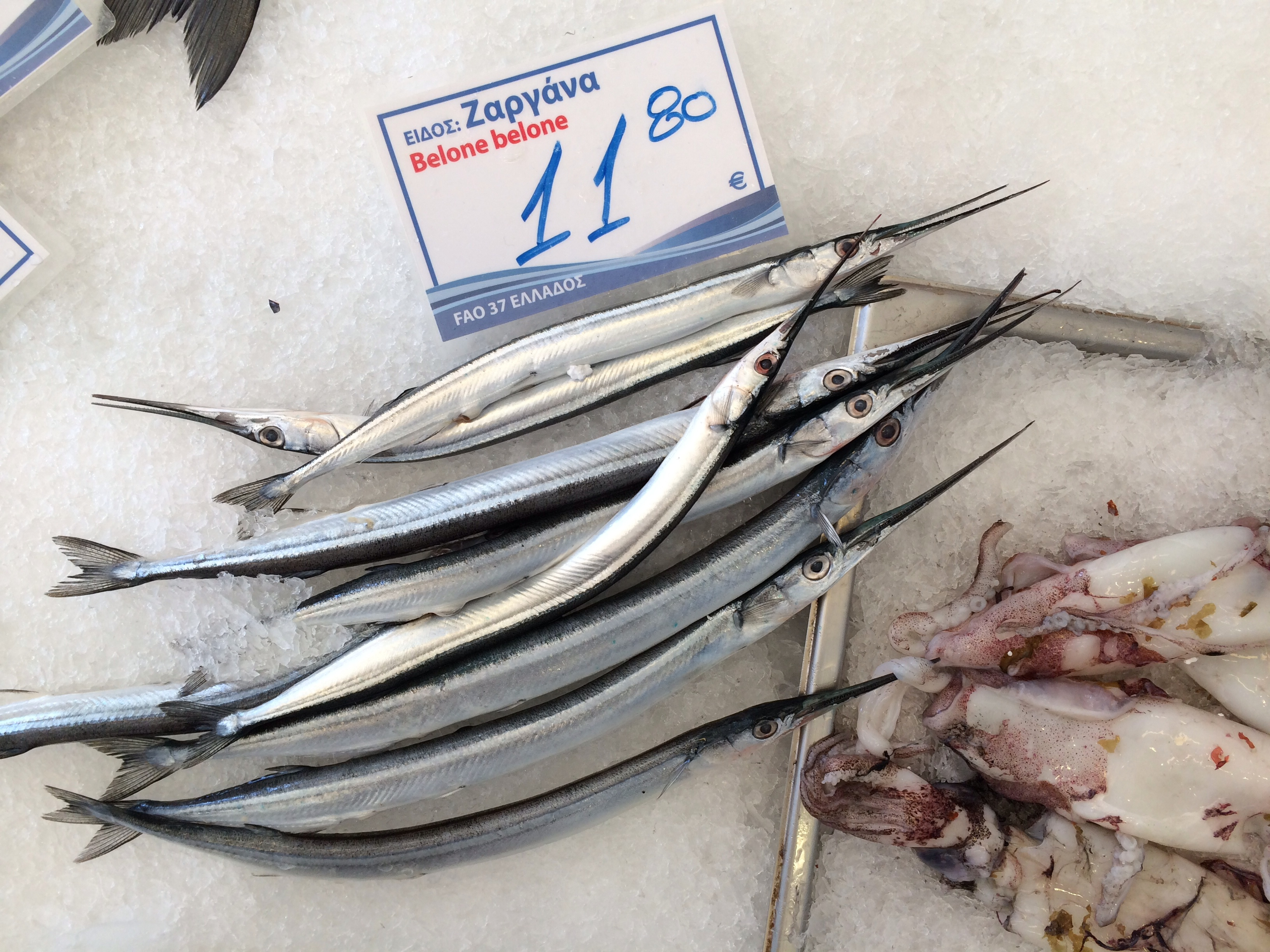
In Greece

== Use as food ==
Garfish are sometimes caught as bycatch, mainly in fixed nets along the coast in shallow waters. If caught with rod and line, they tend to leap out of the water when hooked. Garfish are eaten boiled, fried, baked, grilled, or smoked. They have unusual green bones (due to the presence of biliverdin) which discourages many people from eating them, but the green colour is harmless. They are very popular as a food in Denmark.

== Gallery ==
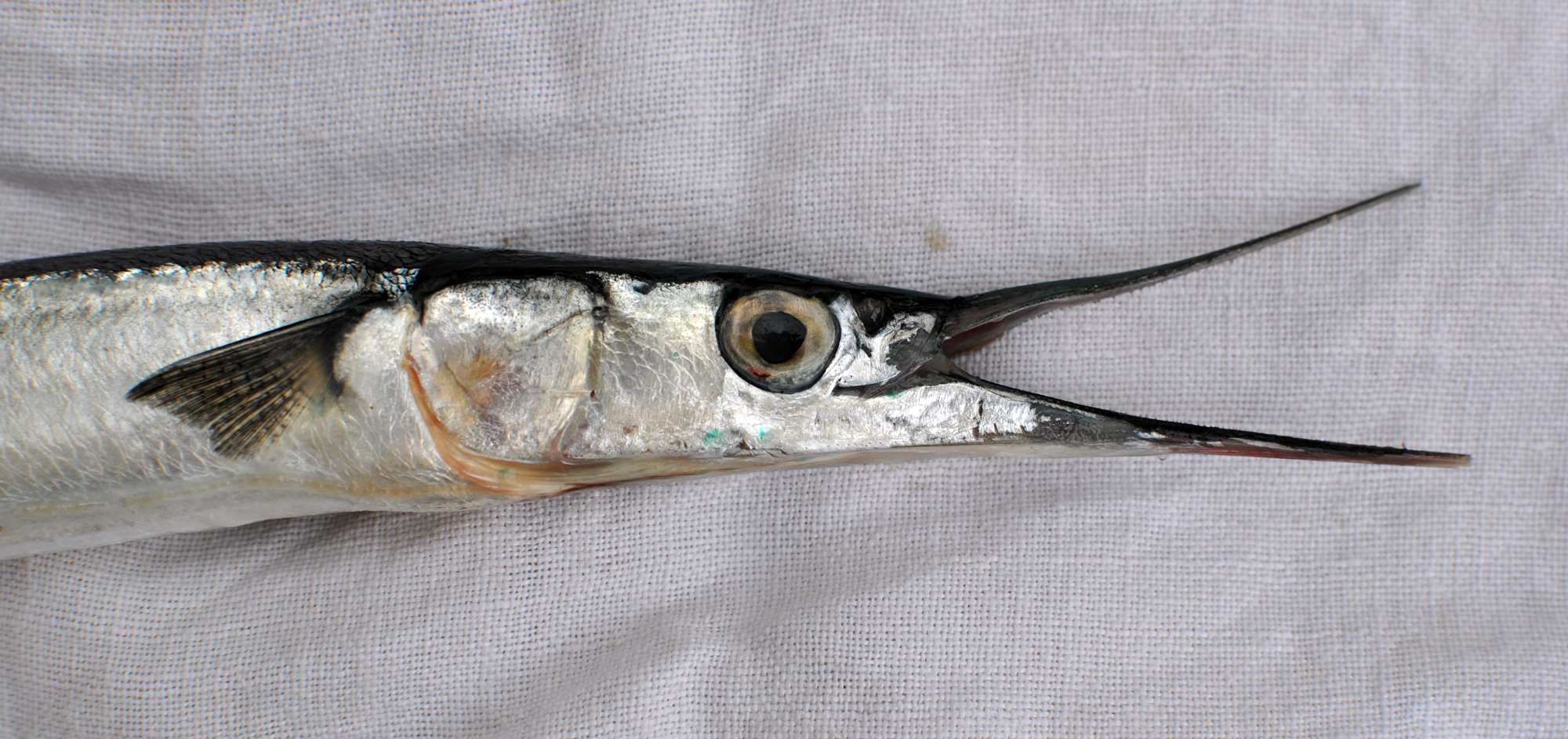

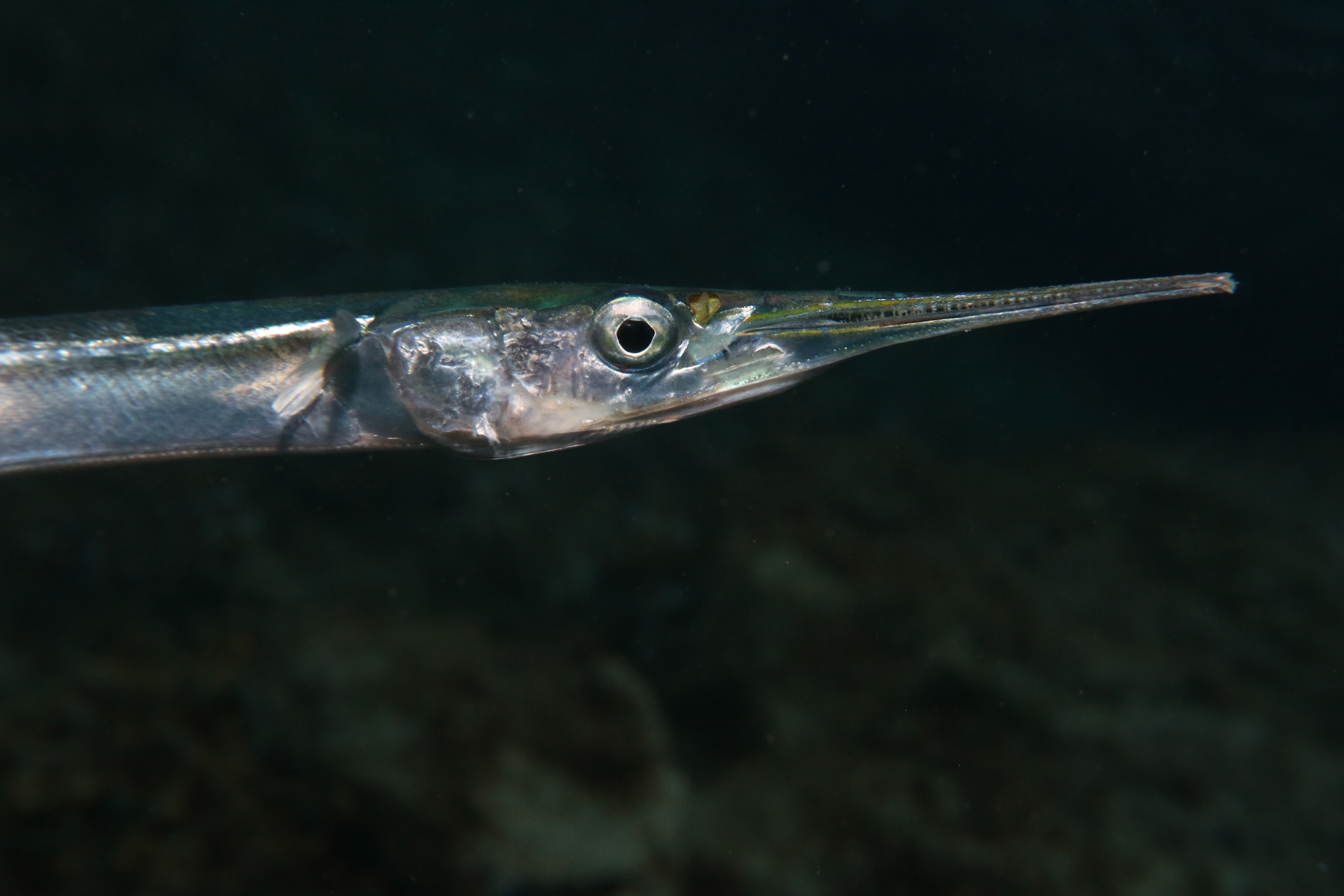

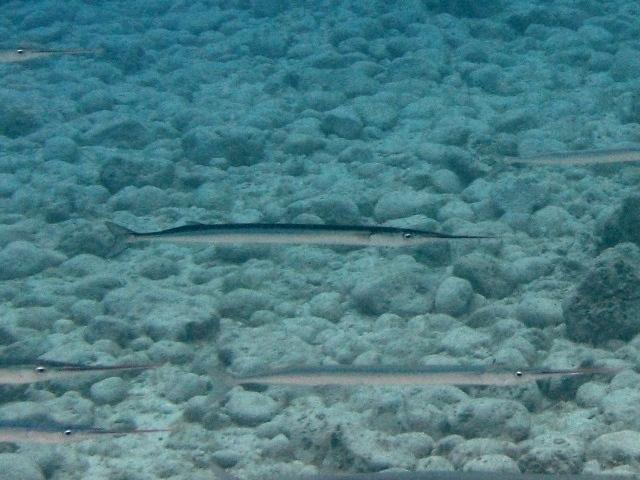

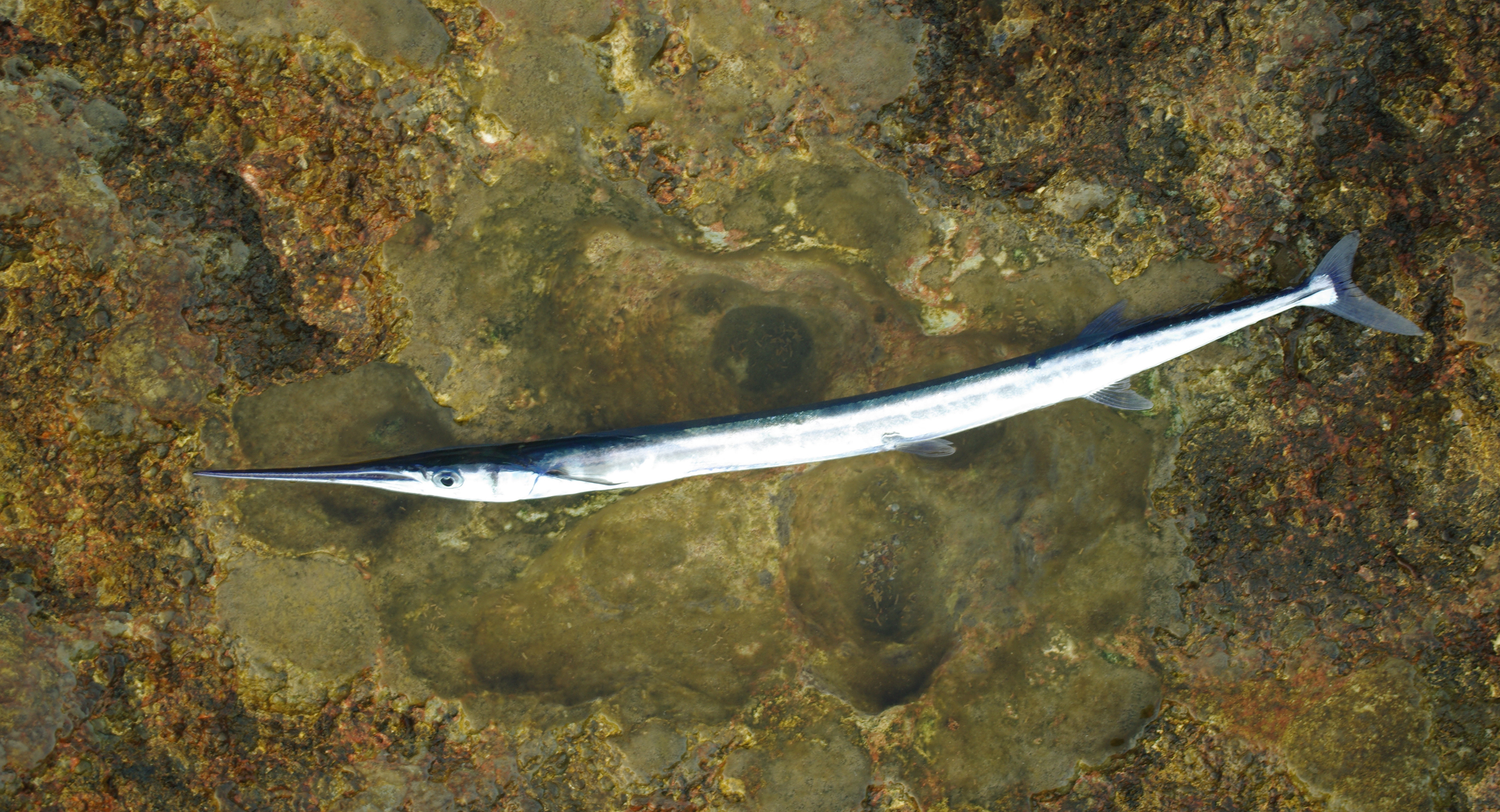

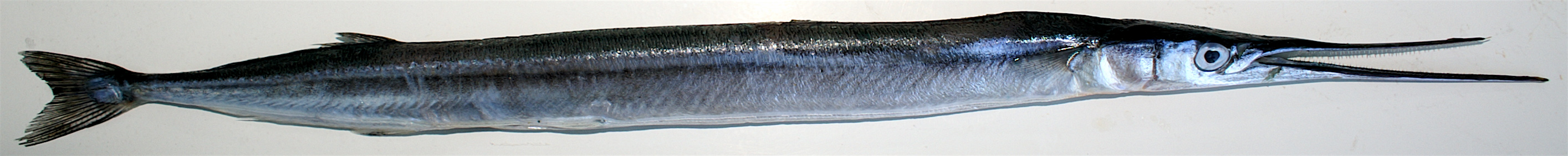
