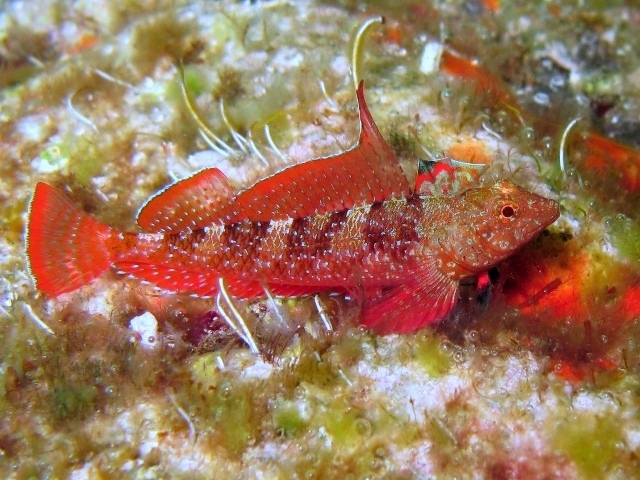

Conservation status
- Least Concern (IUCN 3.1)

Scientific classification
- Kingdom: Animalia
- Phylum: Chordata
- Class: Actinopterygii
- Order: Blenniiformes
- Family: Tripterygiidae
- Genus: Tripterygion
- Species: T. tripteronotum

Binomial name
- Tripterygion tripteronotum (Risso, 1810)

Synonyms
- Blennius tripteronotus Risso, 1810; Tripterygion nasus Risso, 1827; Tripterygion tripteronotus (Risso, 1810)

= Red-black triplefin =

Species of fish

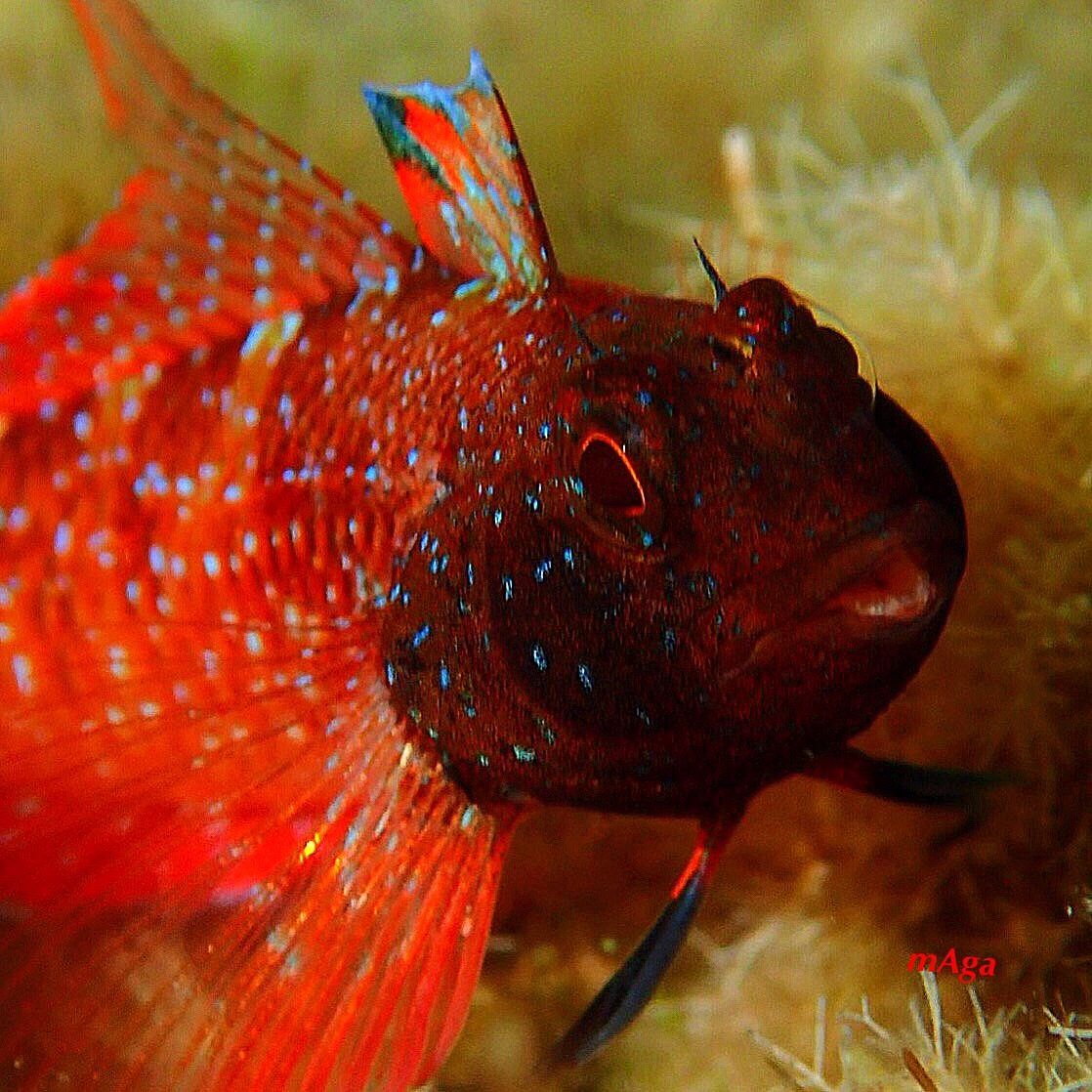
Tripterygion tripteronotus, Ikaria, Greece

The red-black triplefin (Tripterygion tripteronotum) is a species of fish in the family Tripterygiidae, the threefin blennies. It is widespread in the Mediterranean Sea and the Black Sea. In the Black Sea it occurs off the coasts of the Crimea and Ukraine.
