= Strigeidae =

Scientific classification
- Kingdom: Animalia
- Phylum: Platyhelminthes
- Class: Trematoda
- Order: Diplostomida
- Suborder: Diplostomata
- Superfamily: Diplostomoidea
- Family: Strigeidae; Railliet, 1919

Family of flukes

Strigeidae is a family of trematodes in the order Diplostomida.

== Genera ==
- Apatemon Szidat, 1928
- Apharyngostrigea Ciurea, 1927
- Cardiocephaloides Sudarikov, 1959
- Cotylurus Szidat, 1928
- Ichthyocotylurus Odening, 1969
- Parastrigea Szidat, 1928
- Schwartzitrema Pérez Vigueras, 1941
