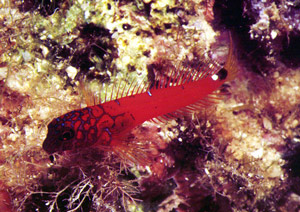

Conservation status
- Least Concern (IUCN 3.1)

Scientific classification
- Kingdom: Animalia
- Phylum: Chordata
- Class: Actinopterygii
- Division: Teleostei
- Order: Blenniiformes
- Family: Blenniidae
- Genus: Microlipophrys
- Species: M. nigriceps

Binomial name
- Microlipophrys nigriceps (Vinciguerra, 1883)

Synonyms
- Blennius nigriceps Vinciguerra, 1883; Blennius nigriceps cypriacus Bath, 1972; Blennius portmahonis Castaños, 1933; Lipophrys nigriceps (Vinciguerra, 1883); Lipophrys nigriceps cypriacus (Bath, 1972); Lipophrys nigriceps nigriceps (Vinciguerra, 1883); Lipophrys nigriceps portmahonis (Castaños, 1933); Microlipophrys nigriceps portmahonis (Castaños, 1933)

= Black-headed blenny =

Species of fish

The black-headed blenny (Microlipophrys nigriceps) is a species of marine ray-finned fish belonging to the family Blenniidae, the combtooth blennies. This species is endemic to the Mediterranean sea.

== Taxonomy ==
The black-headed blenny was first formally described as Blennius nigriceps by the Italian physician and ichthyologist Decio Vinciguerra with its type locality given as Porto Milna, Brazza Island, Dalmatia. This species is now classified in the genus Microlipophrys which is classified within the subfamily Salariinae in the combtooth blenny family Blenniidae.

== Etymology ==
The black-headed blenny has been classified in the genus Microlipophrys, this genus was split from the genus Lipophrys in 2005 as the smaller species classified in Lipophrys formed a monophyletic clade which was not the sister taxon of Lipophrys. The name of this genus was coined by prefixing Lipophrys with micro-, which means "small". The specific name nigriceps, means "black head", an allusion to the black crowns that nuptial males develop.

== Description ==
The black-headed blenny has a thin, elongated body with a maximum total length of 4 cm (1.6 in). It has a rounded head with large eyes high on the sides of the head. There is a single dorsal fin which is supported by 12 spines and between 14 and 16 soft rays, the spiny part of the dorsal fin is separated from the soft-rayed part by a notch. The background colour is red-orange with a black head and a greyish-blue reticulated pattern. The rays of the fins are red-orange with translucent fin membranes on all the fins other than the caudal fin which is red-orange.

== Distribution and habitat ==
The black-headed blenny is found in the Mediterranean Sea, except for the extreme western end of the sea and much of the North African littoral. This species occurs in caves and crevices in areas shaded from the sun, it can also be found in areas with corals. It is found at depths between 0 and 6 m (0 and 20 ft).
