= Sailfin blenny =

Several species of blenny, a fish share the name Sailfin blenny:

- Emblemaria pandionis
- Microlipophrys velifer
