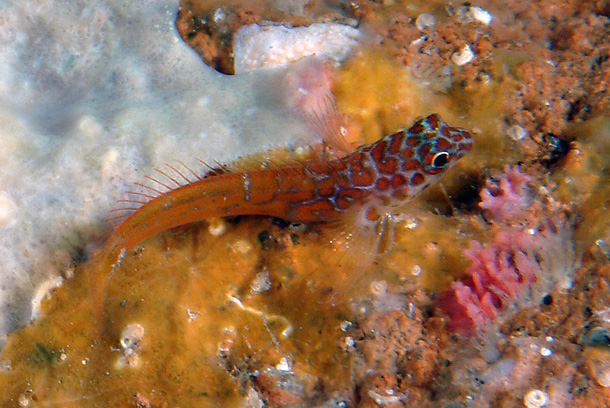
- Microlipophrys nigriceps

Scientific classification
- Kingdom: Animalia
- Phylum: Chordata
- Class: Actinopterygii
- Order: Blenniiformes
- Family: Blenniidae
- Subfamily: Salariinae
- Genus: Microlipophrys; F. Almada, V. C. Almada, Guillemaud & Wirtz, 2005

Type species
- Blennius canevae Vinciguerra, 1880

= Microlipophrys =

Genus of fishes

Microlipophrys is a genus of combtooth blennies found in Atlantic ocean and the Mediterranean Sea.

== Species ==
There are currently seven recognized species in this genus:

- Microlipophrys adriaticus (Steindachner & Kolombatović, 1883) (Adriatic blenny)
- Microlipophrys bauchotae (Wirtz & Bath, 1982)
- Microlipophrys caboverdensis (Wirtz & Bath, 1989)
- Microlipophrys canevae (Vinciguerra, 1880)
- Microlipophrys dalmatinus (Steindachner & Kolombatović, 1883)
- Microlipophrys nigriceps (Vinciguerra, 1883) (Black-headed blenny)
- Microlipophrys velifer (Norman, 1935) (Sailfin blenny)
