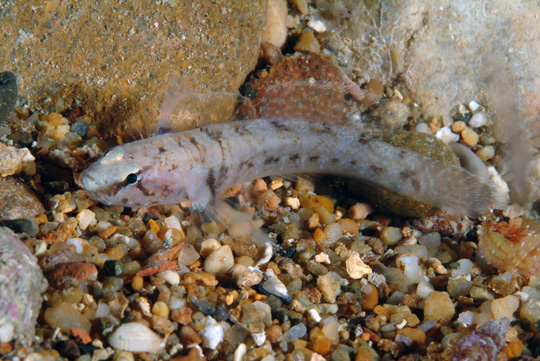
- Kolombatovic's goby

Scientific classification
- Kingdom: Animalia
- Phylum: Chordata
- Class: Actinopterygii
- Order: Gobiiformes
- Family: Gobiidae
- Subfamily: Gobiinae
- Genus: Chromogobius; F. de Buen, 1930

Type species
- Gobius quadrivittatus Steindachner, 1863

Synonyms
- Relictogobius Ptchelina, 1939

= Chromogobius =

Genus of fishes

Chromogobius is a small genus of gobies native to the eastern Atlantic Ocean through the Mediterranean and Adriatic seas to the Black Sea.

== Species ==
There are currently three recognized species in this genus:

- Chromogobius britoi Van Tassell, 2001 (Brito's goby)
- Chromogobius quadrivittatus (Steindachner, 1863) (Chestnut goby)
- Chromogobius zebratus (Kolombatović, 1891) (Kolombatovic's goby)
