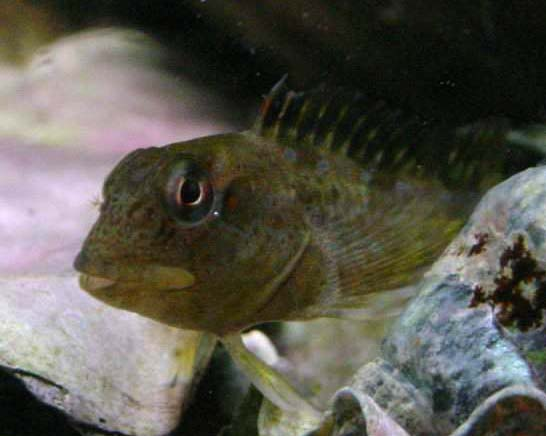
- Shanny (L. pholis)

Scientific classification
- Kingdom: Animalia
- Phylum: Chordata
- Class: Actinopterygii
- Order: Blenniiformes
- Family: Blenniidae
- Subfamily: Salariinae
- Genus: Lipophrys; T. N. Gill, 1896

Type species
- Blennius pholis Linnaeus, 1758

= Lipophrys =

Genus of fishes

Lipophrys is a small genus of combtooth blennies found in Atlantic ocean and the Mediterranean Sea. It is one of 57 genera in the family Blenniidae. The generic name is made up of the Greek words lipo meaning "want" or "absence" and phrys meaning "eyebrow" referring to the lack of any cirri over the eyes in the type species L. pholis.

== Species ==
There are currently two recognized species in this genus:

- Lipophrys pholis (Linnaeus, 1758) (Shanny)
- Lipophrys trigloides (Valenciennes, 1836)

A third species was described from the Adriatic Sea by the French ichthyologist François Charrousset (fr) from two specimens and given the name Lipophrys heuvelmansi. However, in 2015 a comparison of these specimens with another species of combtooth blenny showed that L. heuvelsmani was a junior synonym of Microlipophrys canevae. Another species Lipophrys adriaticus is recognised by some authorities but Fishbase classifies this species as Microlipophrys adriaticus.
