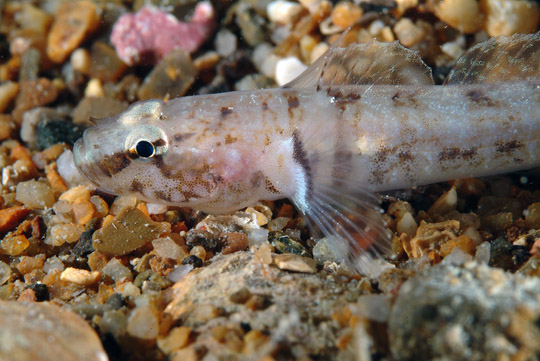

Conservation status
- Least Concern (IUCN 3.1)

Scientific classification
- Domain: Eukaryota
- Kingdom: Animalia
- Phylum: Chordata
- Class: Actinopterygii
- Order: Gobiiformes
- Family: Gobiidae
- Genus: Chromogobius
- Species: C. zebratus

Binomial name
- Chromogobius zebratus (Kolombatović, 1891)

Synonyms
- Gobius depressus var. zebratus, Kolombatovic, 1891; Chromogobius zebratus zebratus, (Kolombatovic, 1891); Gobius depressus zebratus, Kolombatovic, 1891; Gobius depressus, Kolombatovic, 1891 (ambiguous name)

= Kolombatovic's goby =

Species of fish

Chromogobius zebratus, Kolombatovic's goby, is a species of goby found in the Mediterranean and Adriatic Seas where they occur in shallow coastal waters. This species can reach a length of 5.3 centimetres (2.1 in) SL.
