= Marjane, Marjane =

Croatian song

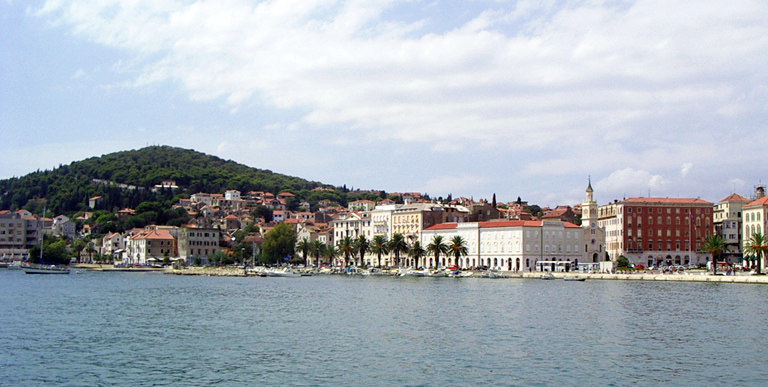
Split City Harbor (Gradska luka) and the scenic Marjan hill, where the city flag is hoisted.

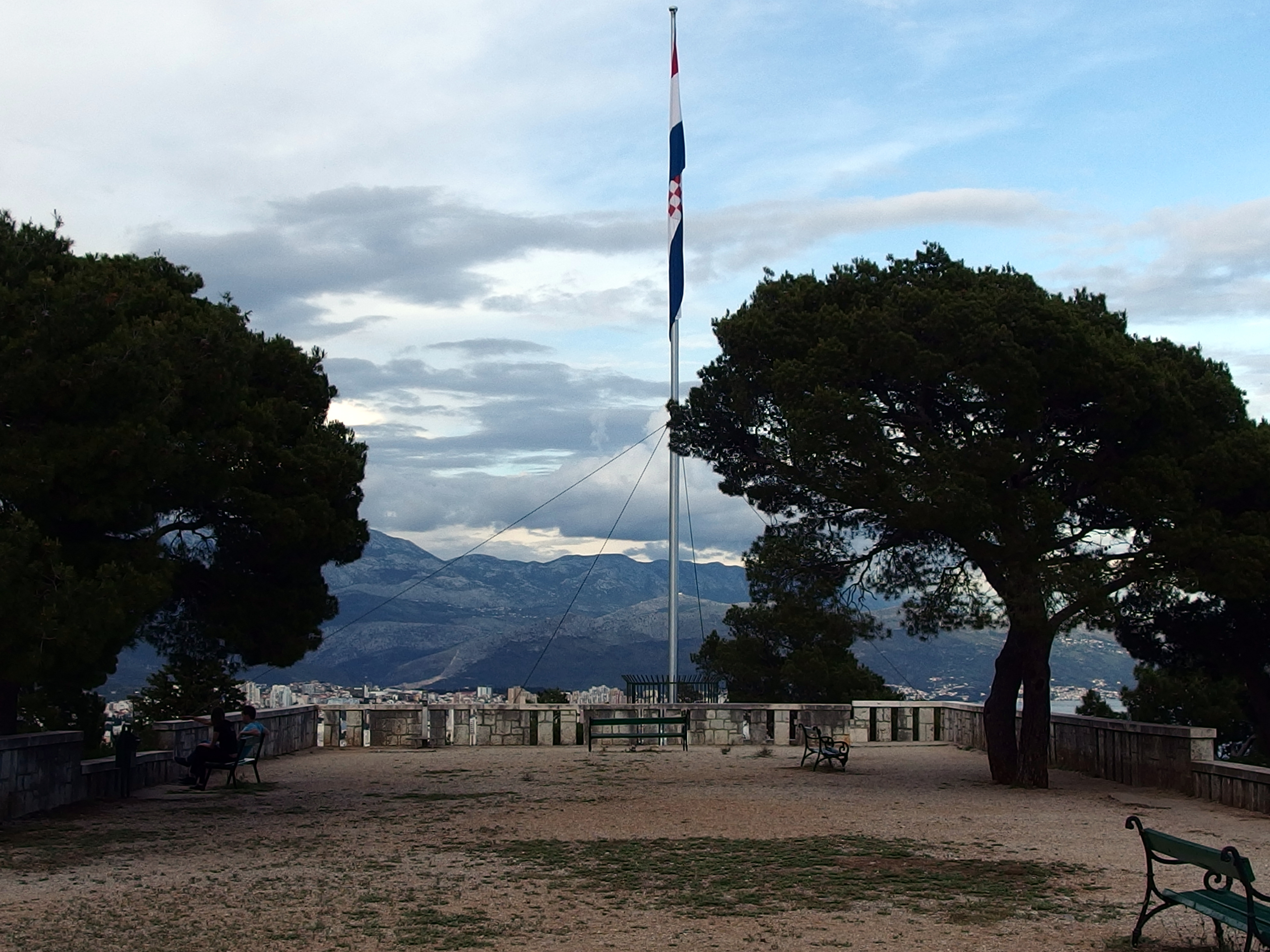
The flag on the Marjan hill

"Marjane, Marjane" (lit. "O Marjan, O Marjan") is a Croatian song from Dalmatia. The name refers to the Marjan hill which overlooks the largest city of Dalmatia, Split, and on which the main (large) city flag is raised. It originates from a folk song sung in the city during the late 1930s, which was first recorded by the poet Ivo Tijardović. Its melody was also used for the Slovenian patriotic song Janez, kranjski Janez (John, John of Carniola).

During World War II the song (with somewhat expanded wording) became very popular among the Yugoslav Partisans. The original song was played on the radio of the Nazi-puppet Independent State of Croatia, the Croatian Radio (Hrvatski krugoval). The original lyrics serve as the official festive song of the city of Split. The song, being traditional, does not have a strictly defined ending, so its ending has changed through time and ideologies. Numerous artists have recorded the song. Najbolji Hrvatski Tamburaši included it in their 1989 release Hrvatska pjesmarica. Trio Gušt released a version with new lyrics in 2009.

== Original (core) lyrics ==
Croatian

Marjane, Marjane, Marjane, Marjane,
Marjane, Marjane, ča barjak ne viješ,
ča barjak ne viješ, ča barjak ne viješ,
ča barjak ne viješ, milu trobojnicu.

Milu trobojnicu, milu trobojnicu,
milu trobojnicu, crven, bili, plavi,
crven, bili, plavi, crven, bili, plavi,
crven, bili, plavi, to je barjak pravi.

English translation

O Marjan, O Marjan, O Marjan, O Marjan,
O Marjan, O Marjan, why don't you fly the flag,
Why don't you fly the flag, why don't you fly the flag,
Why don't you fly the flag, the dear tricolour.

The dear tricolour, the dear tricolour,
The dear tricolour, red, white, blue,
Red, white, blue, red, white, blue,
Red, white, blue, that's the right flag.

== Historical full versions ==
Flag used by Croatian partisans

=== Partisan version ===
Croatian

Marjane, Marjane, Marjane, Marjane,
Marjane, Marjane, ča barjak ne viješ,
ča barjak ne viješ, ča barjak ne viješ,
ča barjak ne viješ, milu trobojnicu?

Na kojon se čita, na kojoj se čita
Na kojon se čita, ime druga Tita!
A na drugoj strani, a na drugoj strani,
A na drugoj strani, naprid Partizani!

A na vrh barjaka, a na vrh barjaka
A na vrh barjaka, zvizda petokraka!

Tko se pod njim bije, tko se pod njim bije,
tko se pod njim bije, kukavica nije,
a 'ko se ne bije, a 'ko se ne bije,
a 'ko se ne bije, bolje da ga nije!

I još jedno slovo, i još jedno slovo,
I još jedno slovo, ime Staljinovo!
I još jedna bratska, i još jedna bratska
I još jedna bratska, živila Hrvatska!

Živila sloboda, živila sloboda,
živila sloboda, Hrvatskog naroda!

English translation

O Marjan, O Marjan, O Marjan, O Marjan,
O Marjan, O Marjan, why don't you fly the flag,
Why don't you fly the flag, why don't you fly the flag,
Why don't you fly the flag, the dear tricolour?

On which is read, on which is read,
On which is read, the name of Comrade Tito!
And on the other side, and on the other side,
And on the other side, "Forward Partisans!"

And on top of the flag, and on top of the flag,
And on top of the flag, a five-pointed star!

Those who fight beneath it, those who fight beneath it,
Those who fight beneath it, are not cowards!
And those who don't, and those who do not,
And those who don't, better they not be!

And another word, and another word,
And another word, the name of Stalin!
And another fraternal [word], and another fraternal
And another fraternal, long live Croatia!

Long live the freedom, long live the freedom,
long live the freedom of the Croatian people!

In later versions, from the beginning of the Informbiro period until the Tito–Stalin split in 1948, the stanza with the reference to Stalin was no longer popular and became used less and less. It was revived in the 1970s nationalist version, with "Jesus" replacing "Stalin" in the wording. The first two stanzas of this version are featured in the Academy Award-nominated motion picture The Battle of Neretva.

=== Contemporary version ===
Flag of the Republic of Croatia.

Croatian

Marjane, Marjane, Marjane, Marjane,
Marjane, Marjane, ča barjak ne viješ,
ča barjak ne viješ, ča barjak ne viješ,
ča barjak ne viješ, milu trobojnicu.

Milu trobojnicu, milu trobojnicu,
milu trobojnicu, crven, bili, plavi,
crven, bili, plavi, crven, bili, plavi,
crven, bili, plavi, to je barjak pravi.

Pod kojim su pali, pod kojim su pali,
pod kojim su pali Zrinski-Frankopani.
Za kojim se hvali, za kojim se hvali,
za kojim se hvali, cila Dalmacija!

Tko se pod njim bije, tko se pod njim bije,
tko se pod njim bije, kukavica nije,
a 'ko se ne bije, a 'ko se ne bije,
a 'ko se ne bije, bolje da ga nije.

I još jedno slovo, i još jedno slovo,
I još jedno slovo, ime Isusovo
I još jedna bratska, i još jedna bratska
I još jedna bratska, živila Hrvatska!

Živila sloboda, živila sloboda,
živila sloboda, Hrvatskog naroda!.

English translation

O Marjan, O Marjan, O Marjan, O Marjan,
O Marjan, O Marjan, why don't you fly the flag,
Why don't you fly the flag, why don't you fly the flag,
Why don't you fly the flag, the dear tricolour?

The dear tricolour, the dear tricolour,
The dear tricolour, red, white, blue,
Red, white, blue, red, white, blue,
Red, white, blue, that's the true flag.

Under which they fell, under which they fell,
under which they fell, the Zrinski-Frankopans.
For whom thanks, for whom thanks,
for whom thanks all Dalmatia.

Those who fight beneath it, those who fight beneath it,
Those who fight beneath it, are not cowards,
And they who don't, and they who don't,
And they who don't, better they not be.

And another word, and another word,
And another word, the name of Jesus
And another fraternal [word], and another fraternal
And another fraternal, long live Croatia!

Long live the freedom, long live the freedom,
long live the freedom, of the Croatian people!

This is the version more widely known in post-1989 Croatia. One of its first large scale performances was on May 30, 1990, by the Croatian singer Duško Lokin. It is often sung by Torcida, the supporters of the Split football club, HNK Hajduk.

== See also ==
- Music of Croatia
- Flags of Croatia
- History of Croatia
