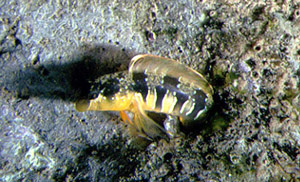

Conservation status
- Least Concern (IUCN 3.1)

Scientific classification
- Kingdom: Animalia
- Phylum: Chordata
- Class: Actinopterygii
- Order: Blenniiformes
- Family: Blenniidae
- Genus: Microlipophrys
- Species: M. dalmatinus

Binomial name
- Microlipophrys dalmatinus (Steindachner & Kolombatović, 1883)

Synonyms
- Blennius dalmatinus Steindachner & Kolombatović, 1883; Lipophrys dalmatinus (Steindachner & Kolombatović, 1883)

= Microlipophrys dalmatinus =

Species of fish

Microlipophrys dalmatinus, the blennie dalmate, is a species of combtooth blenny found in the northeast Atlantic Ocean near Portugal, and the Mediterranean Sea. This species grows to a length of 4.1 centimetres (1.6 in) TL.
