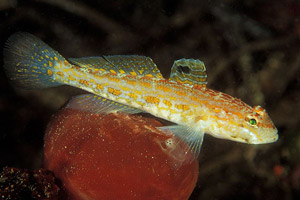

Conservation status
- Least Concern (IUCN 3.1)

Scientific classification
- Kingdom: Animalia
- Phylum: Chordata
- Class: Actinopterygii
- Order: Gobiiformes
- Family: Gobiidae
- Genus: Gobius
- Species: G. kolombatovici

Binomial name
- Gobius kolombatovici Kovačić & P. J. Miller, 2000

= Gobius kolombatovici =

Species of fish

Gobius kolombatovici is a species of goby native to the northern Adriatic Sea where it occurs at depths of 15 to 38 metres (49 to 125 ft) in areas with patches of rock and softer sediments. This species can reach a length of 9.2 centimetres (3.6 in) SL. The specific name honours the Croatian mathematician, naturalist and taxonomist Juraj Kolombatovic (1843-1908), who carried out extensive work on the small inshore fishes of the Adriatic Sea.
