= Microlipophrys caboverdensis =

Conservation status
- Least Concern (IUCN 3.1)

Scientific classification
- Kingdom: Animalia
- Phylum: Chordata
- Class: Actinopterygii
- Order: Blenniiformes
- Family: Blenniidae
- Genus: Microlipophrys
- Species: M. caboverdensis

Binomial name
- Microlipophrys caboverdensis (Wirtz & Bath, 1989)

Synonyms
- Lipophrys caboverdensis Wirtz & Bath, 1989

Species of fish

Microlipophrys caboverdensis is a species of marine fish in the family Blenniidae, the combtooth blennies. It is endemic to Cape Verde, eastern central Atlantic Ocean. The species was named and described as Lipophrys caboverdensis by Peter Wirtz and Hans Bath in 1989. Its common name in Portuguese and Capeverdean Creole is "mané-cabeça".

== Description ==
This species grows to a length of 4 centimetres (1.6 in) TL. It is an oviparous species; the eggs are attached to the substrate with a filamentous adhesive pad.
