= Brito's goby =

Conservation status
- Least Concern (IUCN 3.1)

Scientific classification
- Domain: Eukaryota
- Kingdom: Animalia
- Phylum: Chordata
- Class: Actinopterygii
- Order: Gobiiformes
- Family: Gobiidae
- Genus: Chromogobius
- Species: C. britoi

Binomial name
- Chromogobius britoi Van Tassell, 2001

Species of fish

Brito's goby (Chromogobius britoi) is a species of goby found in the Eastern Atlantic near the coasts of the Canary Islands and Madeira where it occurs at depths of from 6 to 65 metres (20 to 213 ft) on rock outcrops. This fish inhabits crevices in the rocks. Males of this species can reach a length of 3.4 centimetres (1.3 in) SL while females only reach 2.5 centimetres (0.98 in) SL. The specific name honours Alberto Brito Hernández (b. 1954) of the University of La Laguna on Tenerife for his numerous contributions to the ichthyology of the Canary Islands.
