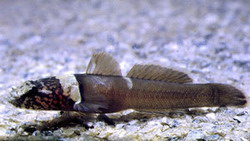

Conservation status
- Least Concern (IUCN 3.1)

Scientific classification
- Kingdom: Animalia
- Phylum: Chordata
- Class: Actinopterygii
- Order: Gobiiformes
- Family: Gobiidae
- Genus: Chromogobius
- Species: C. quadrivittatus

Binomial name
- Chromogobius quadrivittatus (Steindachner, 1863)

Synonyms
- Gobius quadrivittatus Steindachner, 1863; Gobius depressus quadrivittata Steindachner, 1863; Gobius planiceps Bellotti, 1879; Gobius depressus Kolombatovic, 1891; Chromogobius kryzanowskii Ptchelina, 1939

= Chestnut goby =

Species of fish

The chestnut goby (Chromogobius quadrivittatus) is a species of goby found in the Mediterranean and Black Sea. In the Black Sea it is found in the Gulf of Varna, saline lagoons near Abrau, also near Novorossiysk and Sochi. This species occurs in shallow, coastal waters. It can reach a length of 6.6 centimetres (2.6 in) SL.
