= Split Science Museum and Zoo =

Split Science Museum
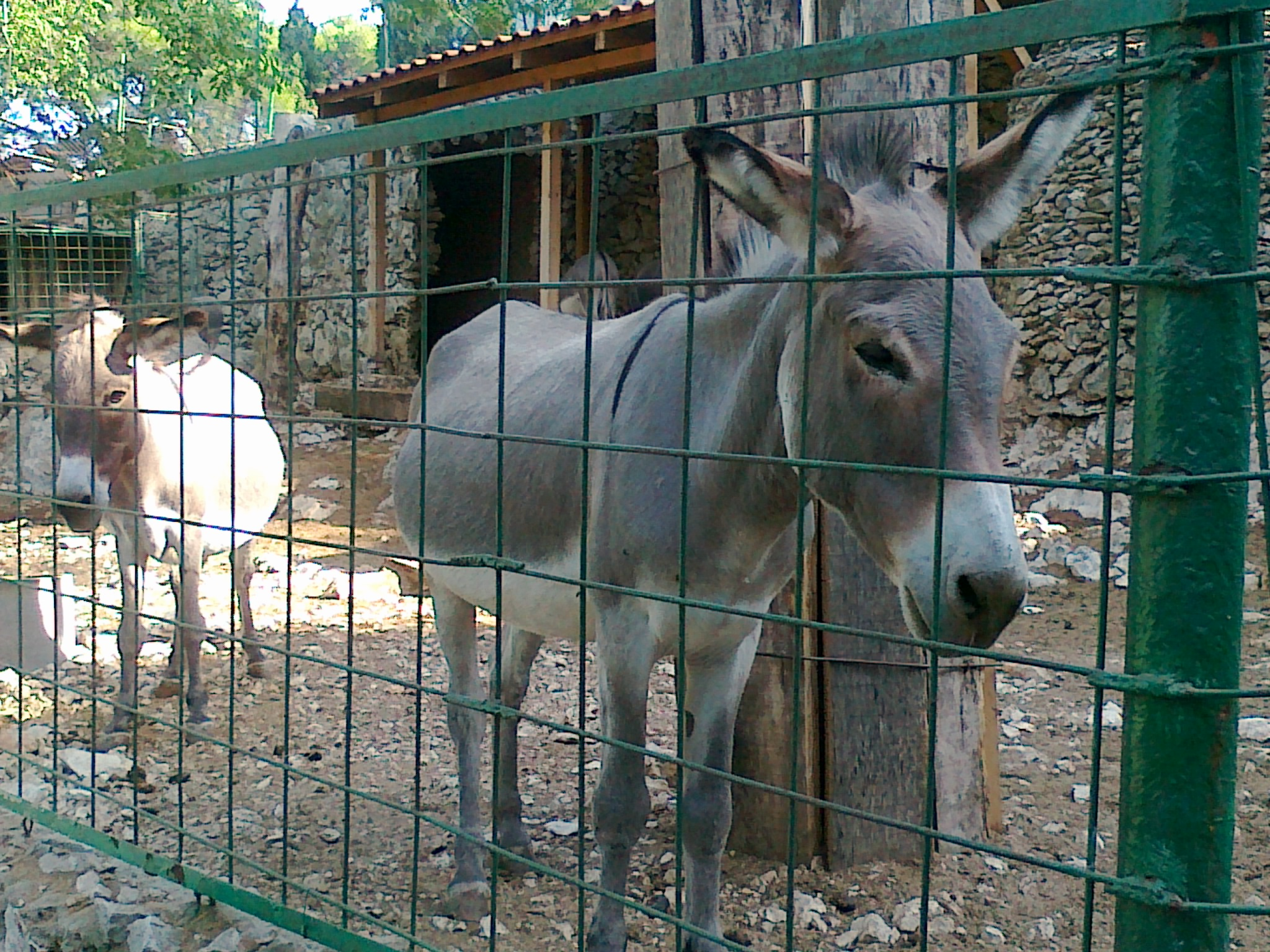
- Donkeys in Split Zoo
- Interactive map of Split Science Museum
- 43°30′31″N 16°25′33″E
- Date opened: 1924 (museum); 1928 (Zoo)
- Location: Split, Croatia
- Land area: 0.65 hectares (1.6 acres)
- No. of animals: 450 (2006)
- No. of species: 55 (2006)

Split Science Museum (Croatian: Prirodoslovni muzej i zoološki vrt grada Splita) is a museum located on mount Marjan hill, in Split, Croatia. The Science museum is an old house. The museum present few collections as mineralogy and geology collections and more

== History ==
In 2006, after years of protests by animal rights groups, Split Zoo decided to relocate all of its exotic animals and stop accepting new ones. Nevertheless, the miserable situation for the animals has not changed and animal protection groups in Croatia receive countless complaints by shocked tourists on a regular basis. In 2014 the zoo announced that it will be closing and relocating all animals.

In June 2015, after the closing of the museum and zoo in 2014, an artists collective founded by artist Hrvoje Cokarich from Split decided to help the left over animals. Finding that people/governments don't like to take care of humans, animals or things that have no purpose (like donkeys being replaced by cars), they are trying to find new purpose for the animals. This way they hope that either because of the publicity and/or the use / profit of the new purpose the people and city government will see the purpose and therefore also feel the need to take care of the animals.

Ever since 2016, artists come up with alternative purpose to avoid extinction of the animals. (Inter)national artists are invited to actually apply to do a week long residency at the zoo and make a project with/for the donkeys.

Artists that participated in the project so far are: Hrvoje Cokaric, Vanja Pagar, Darko Skrobonja, Ranko Smoljan, Petar Pecur, Ronald Panza, Matija Habijanec, Igor Milhovilovic, Matea Munitic Mihovilovic, Ivo Poderzaj, Dragan Dokic, Ivan Svagusa, Tomislav Miljak, Ivo Jerkunica, Darvin Butkovic, Marko Brecelj, Zoran Kelava and Nela Sisaric.

== See also ==
- List of museums in Croatia
