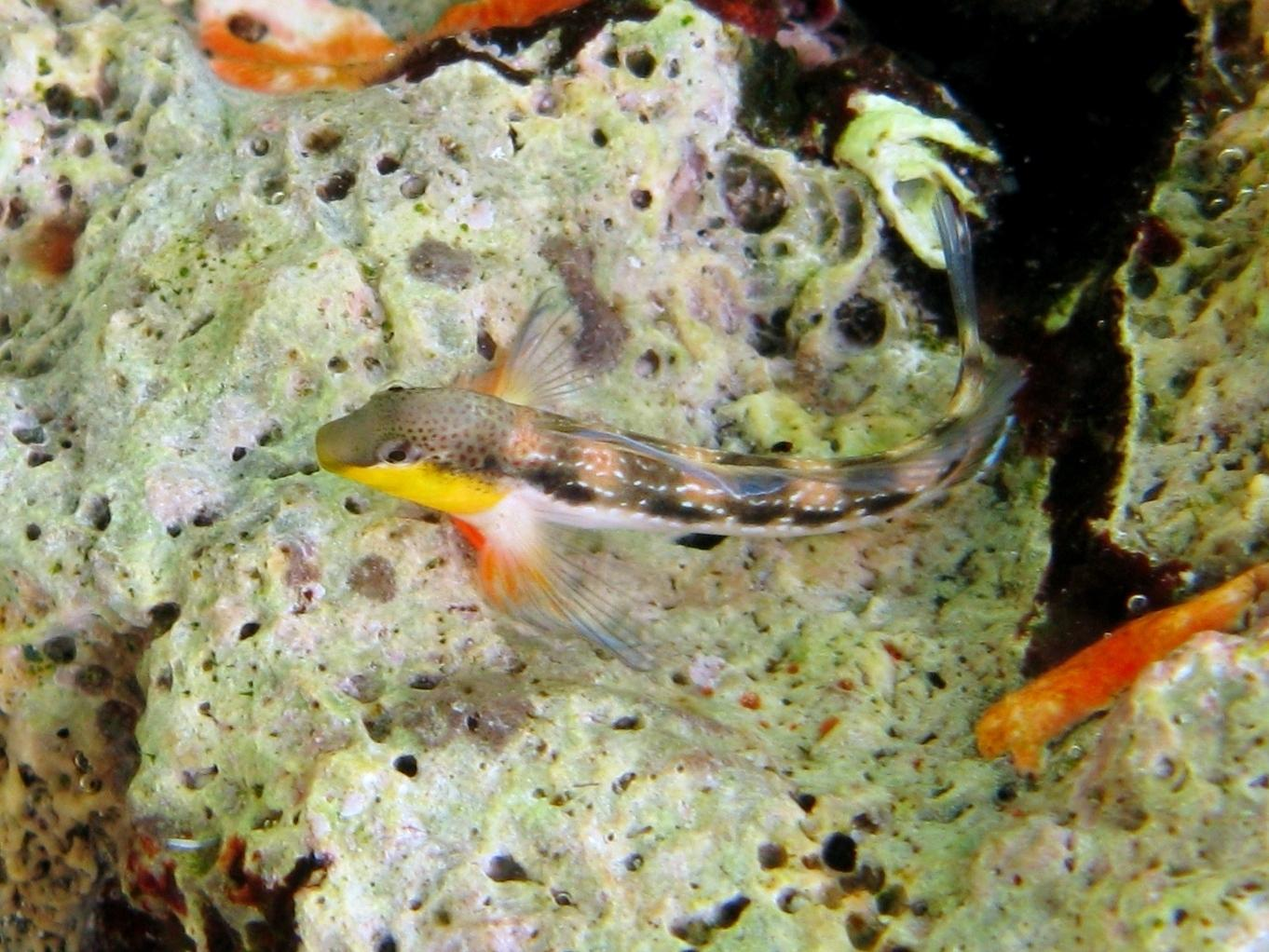

Conservation status
- Least Concern (IUCN 3.1)

Scientific classification
- Kingdom: Animalia
- Phylum: Chordata
- Class: Actinopterygii
- Order: Blenniiformes
- Family: Blenniidae
- Genus: Microlipophrys
- Species: M. adriaticus

Binomial name
- Microlipophrys adriaticus (Steindachner & Kolombatović, 1883)
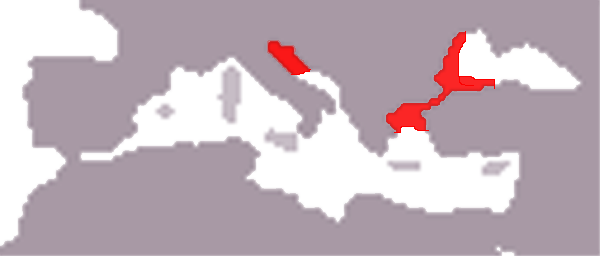
- The Range of the Adriatic blenny

Synonyms
- Blennius adriaticus Steindachner & Kolombatovic, 1883; Lipophrys adriaticus (Steindachner & Kolombatovic, 1883)

= Adriatic blenny =

Species of fish

The Adriatic blenny, Microlipophrys adriaticus, is a species of combtooth blenny widespread in the Mediterranean Sea, the Adriatic Sea and the Aegean Sea, also known from the Sea of Marmara and the Black Sea. This species grows to a length of 4 centimetres (1.6 in) TL.
