= Microlipophrys bauchotae =

Conservation status
- Data Deficient (IUCN 3.1)

Scientific classification
- Kingdom: Animalia
- Phylum: Chordata
- Class: Actinopterygii
- Order: Blenniiformes
- Family: Blenniidae
- Genus: Microlipophrys
- Species: M. bauchotae

Binomial name
- Microlipophrys bauchotae (Wirtz & Bath, 1982)

Synonyms
- Lipophrys bauchotae Wirtz & Bath, 1982

Species of fish

Microlipophrys bauchotae is a species of combtooth blenny found in the eastern Atlantic ocean, known only from the Bay of Victoria, Cameroon and Bahia de Isabel, Bioko. This species grows to a length of 4.3 centimetres (1.7 in) TL.

== Etymology ==
The specific name honours the French ichthyologist and assistant manager at the Muséum national d'histoire naturelle in Paris Marie-Louise Bauchot who had realised that this was a new species in 1967 but who felt there was too little material to describe a new species.
