= Marjan, Split =

Hill in Split, Croatia

Marjan
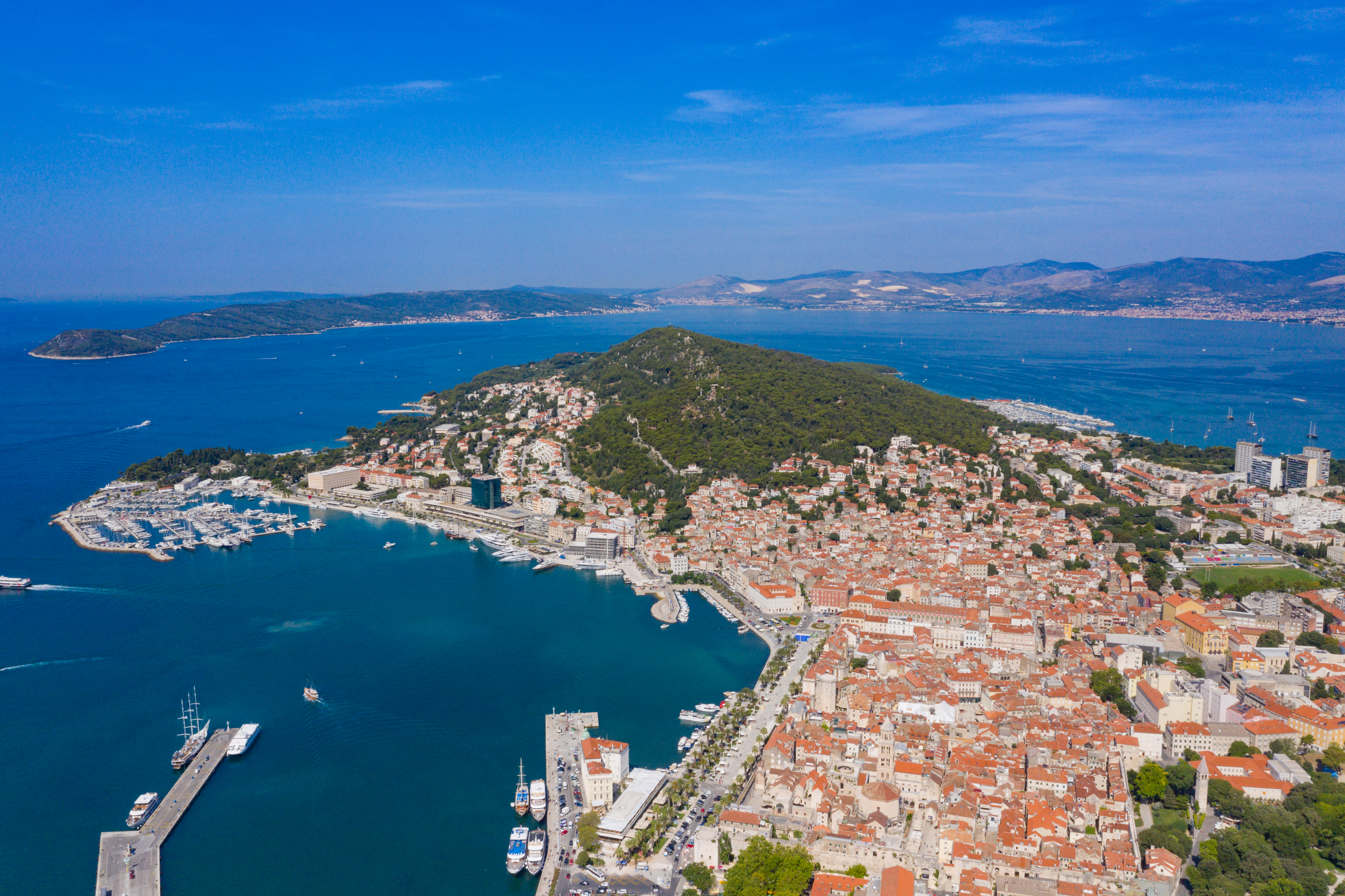
- Old town of Split and Marjan in the center

Highest point
- Elevation: 178 m (584 ft)
- Coordinates: 43°30′30″N 16°24′30″E

Geography
- Location within Croatia
- Location: Marjan Park-Forest, Dalmatia, Croatia
- Parent range: Dinaric Alps

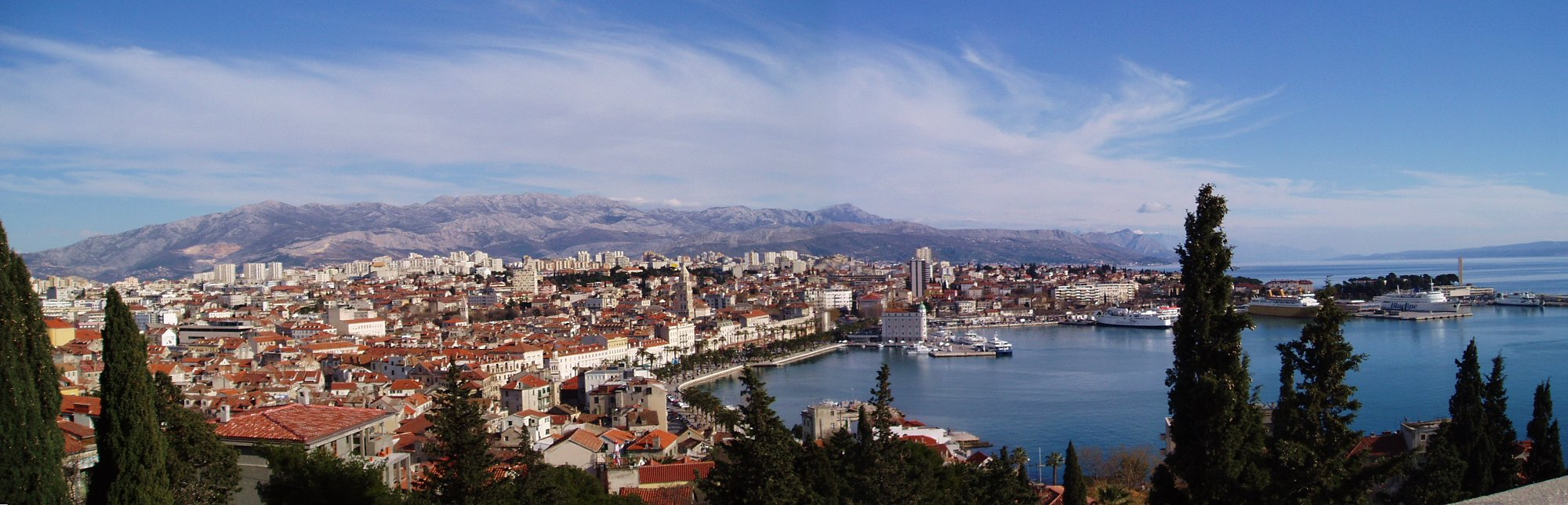
Panoramic view of Split as seen from Marjan hill.

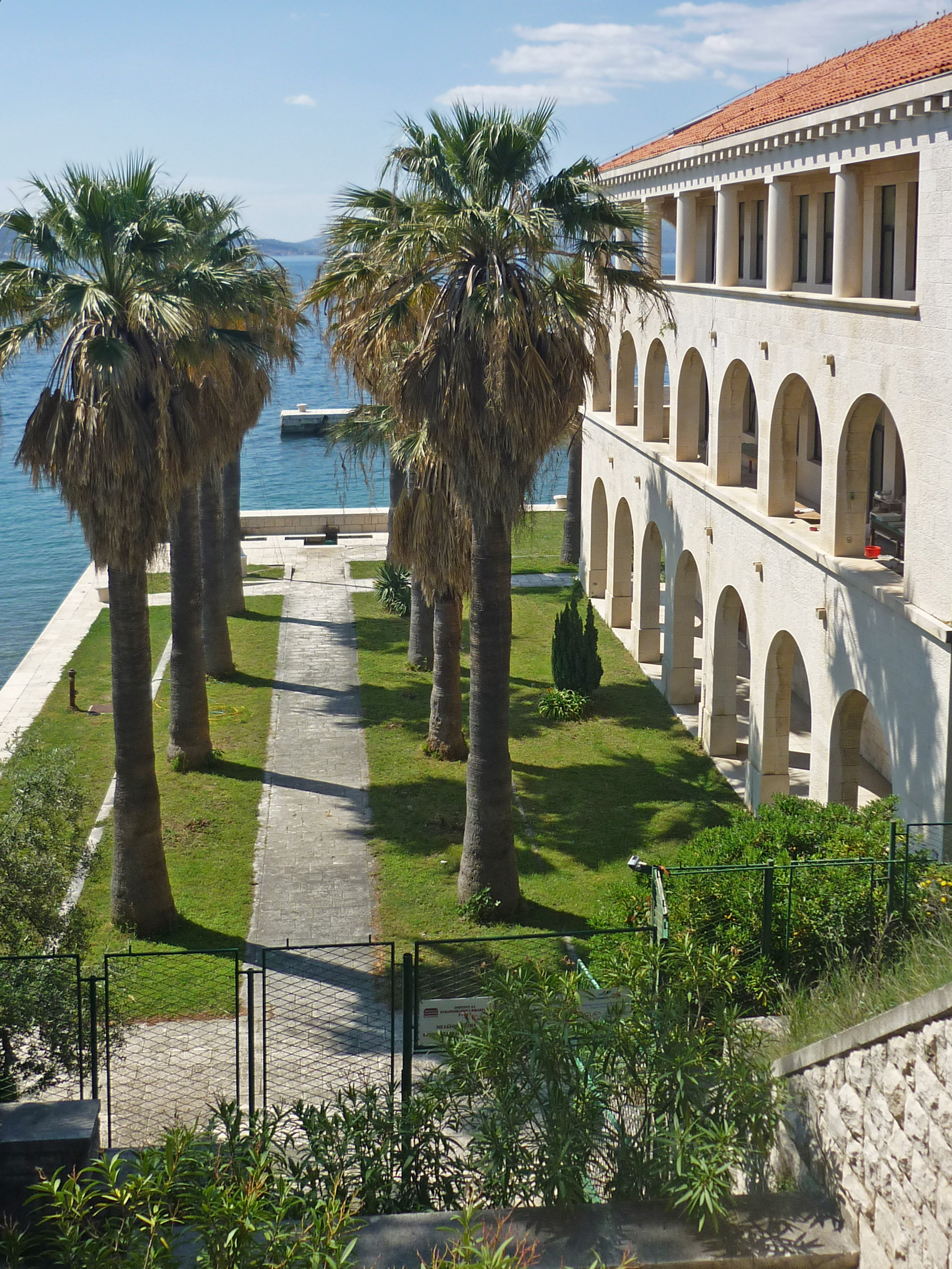
The Split Oceanographic Institute, situated on Marjan.

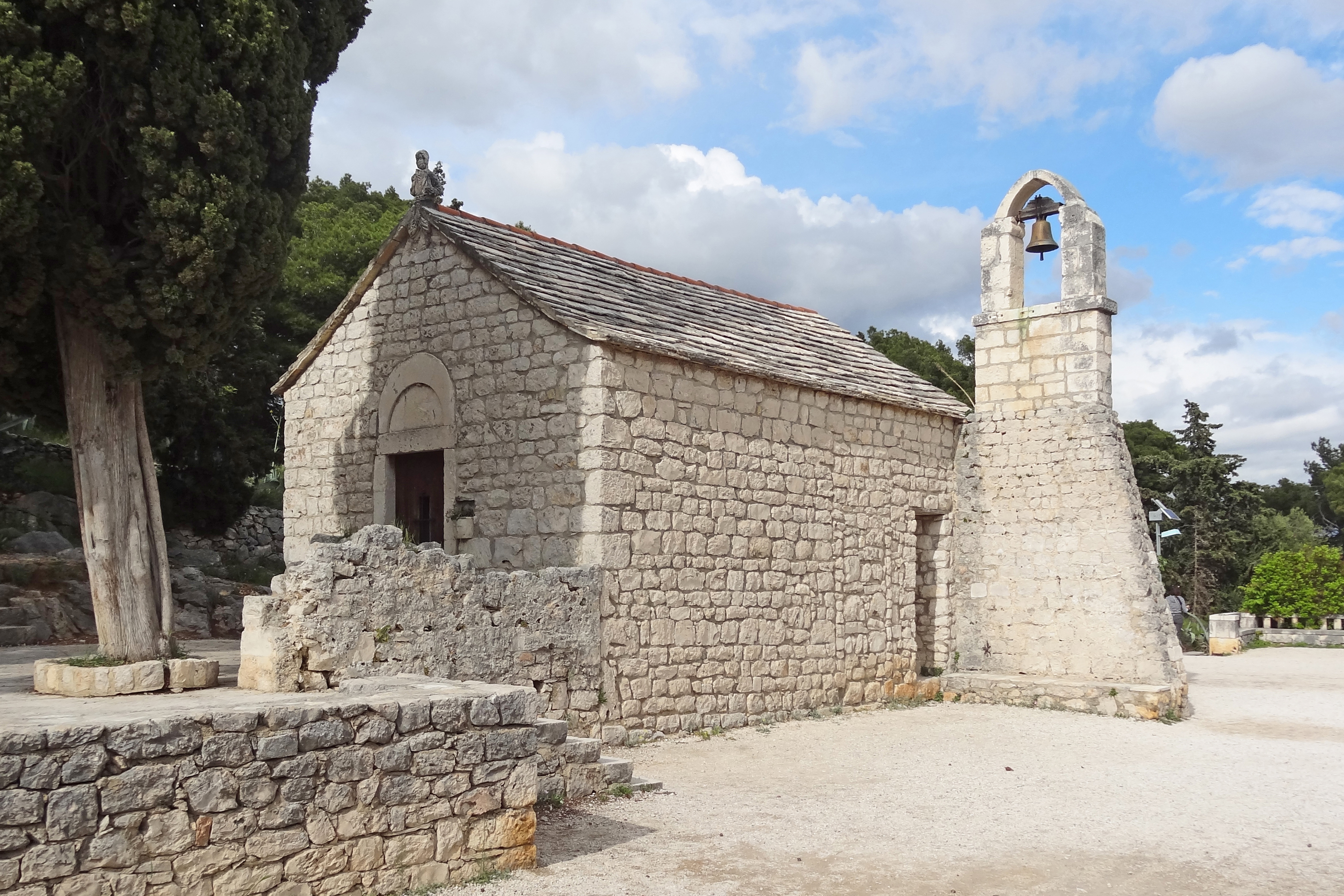
Church of St. Nicholas on Marjan hill

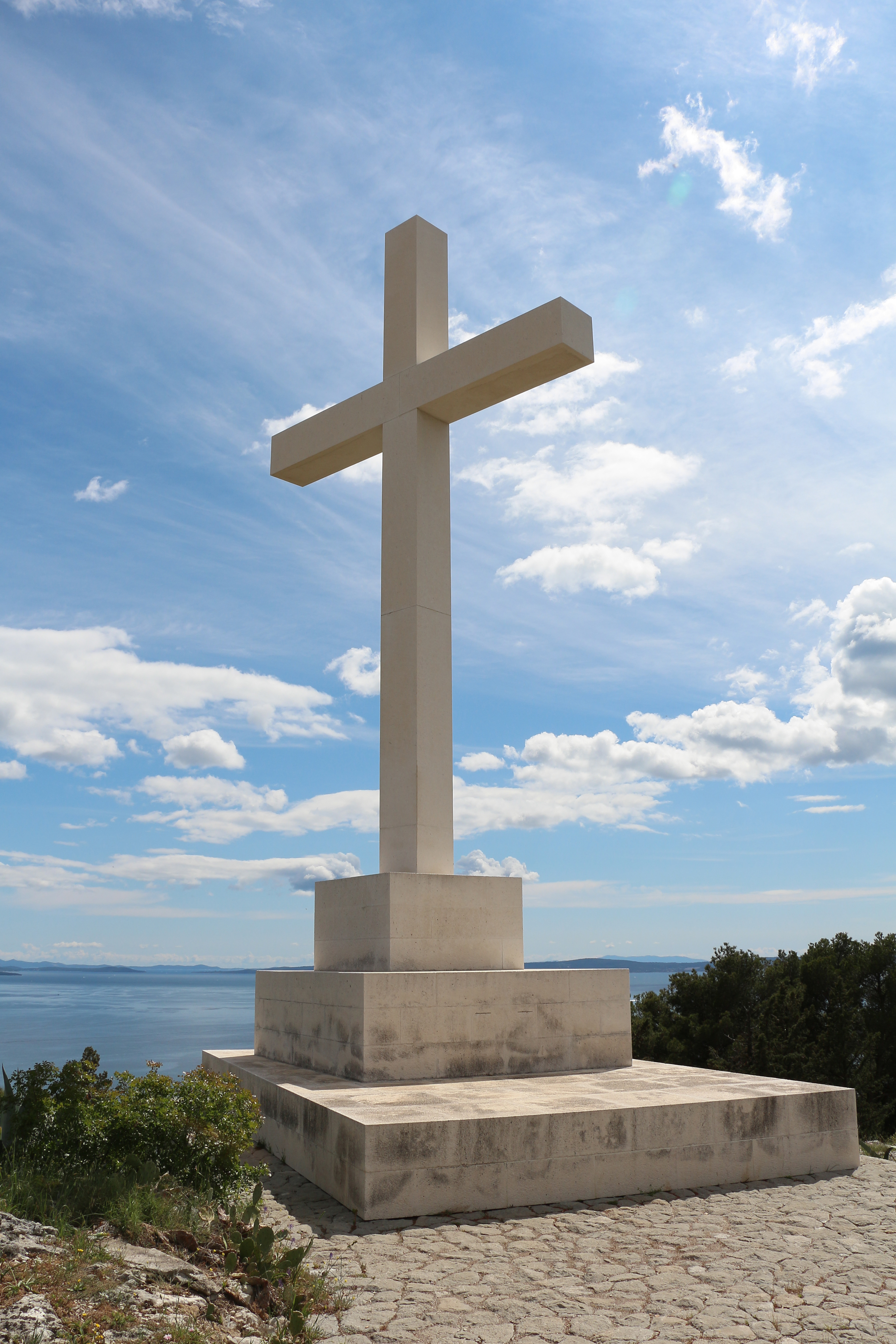
Cross on Marjan hill

Marjan (Croatian pronunciation: [mârjan]) is a hill on the peninsula of the city of Split, the second largest city of Croatia. It is covered in a dense Mediterranean pine forest and completely surrounded by the city and the sea, making it a unique sight. Originally used as a park by the citizens as early as the 3rd century, it is a favorite weekend excursion destination and a recreational center for the city. It is also the setting for numerous beaches and jogging trails as well as tennis courts and the city Zoo, all surrounded by the scenic forest. The tip of the peninsula houses the Institute of Oceanography and Fisheries (Institut za oceanografiju i ribarstvo, IZOR).

Marjan is 178 m tall and offers a view of the entire city, the surrounding islands, and the nearby mountains of Mosor and Kozjak.

Beaches Obojena, Kašjuni and Bene are located at the foot of Marjan hill.

== History ==
In ancient times Emperor Diocletian built his palace a few minutes walk from Marjan. This opulent palace-city was actually inhabited by up to 8,000 to 10,000 people, who required parks and recreation space, Diocletian therefore organized some areas of Marjan nearer to the palace as a park. There is also a small rustic early 13th century AD church situated on Marjan Hill. The church is dedicated to Saint Nicholas (Sv. Nikole) a favourite saint of fishermen, of which there are many in Split. Two and a half kilometres further along the path that runs along the south rim of Marjan is the fifteenth century church of St. Jerome (Sv. Jeronima). The church has an altar carved by Andrija Aleši. Built into clefts in the cliffs directly above and behind St. Jerome are a group of Renaissance hermitage caves, first used in the 15th century. On the eastern slopes of the Marjan, just above the city, is Split's Old Jewish Cemetery. First established in 1573, the cemetery has over 700 graves, with readable tombstones from the eighteenth to twentieth centuries, the last burial taking place in 1945 when it was closed and protected as a monument.

Marjan has become a symbol of Split in the last century and a half, before that it was considered an ordinary part of the landscape. As the city grew, however, it was left out because of its rocky and difficult terrain, and became, in effect, a part of the wilderness next to the very center of the city. Soon the citizens started to frequent it as a picnic spot and a romantic retreat, its many beaches adding to its popularity as well.

During the Second World War, Marjan was the subject of a popular Partisan song "Marjane, Marjane", sung by the Split (and Dalmatian) members of that anti-fascist movement and was reportedly a favorite song of resistance leader and future president of the new SFR Yugoslavia, Josip Broz Tito. Indeed, the flamboyant Partisan leader was so fond of the hill itself, he chose it as the site for the summer residence of the Yugoslav president, the Vila Dalmacija. In the 1950s, during the period of the second Yugoslavia, the Federal Government, in conjunction with local Split authorities, undertook a massive project for the transformation of the entire wild hill into a forest park. The hill was intensively forested (large parts of it were barren until then), many recreational facilities were built, including jogging tracks, a road system encircling the peninsula, a maritime research institute, the Split City Zoo (now fallen into disrepair), botanical garden (recently abandoned) and a water pipeline reaching all the way to the top of the hill. The authorities also constructed the city weather station and two "vidilice", or "look-out points", as resting places connected with a long stairway all the way to the Diocletian's Palace, the "Riva" promenade and the rest of the city center.

On the south side of the Marjan is the Meštrović Gallery housed in the former villa of Ivan Meštrović, thought by many to be one of the greatest sculptors of religious subjects since the Renaissance.

== Climate ==
Since records began in 1948, the highest temperature recorded at the local weather station at an elevation of 122 metres (400 ft) was 38.6 °C (101.5 °F) on 5 July 1950, and the coldest −9.0 °C (15.8 °F) on 23 January 1963.

== Chronology ==
- 8th century – The first mention of Marjan hill as Marulianus.
- 13th century – The hill of Marjan is encircled by a fence, and considered a municipal forest. Church of St. Nicholas built.
- 14th century – The City of Split Statute prohibits the cutting down of trees on Marjan.
- 15th century – Establishment of the church of St. Jerome and of Hermitage caves.
- 1573 – Establishment of the Jewish Cemetery
- 19th century – The first wider trails on the eastern part of the hill are constructed.
- 1852 – The first afforestation of Marjan with Aleppo pine in the Jewish cemetery is undertaken.
- 1884 – Systematic afforestation of Marjan thanks to diligence and activism of Professor Juraj Kolombatović.
- 1903 – On 9 May, Professor Juraj Kolombatović founds the Marjan Association and becomes its first president. The same year, the association builds a road from Veli Varoš to Marjan's first peak.
- 1905 – With voluntary contributions, the association builds a trail to Marjan's second peak. Two belvederes at prominent places of the hill are constructed.
- 1907 – The association reconstructs the old pathway to the first peak, behind the Jewish cemetery, as stairways.
- 1908 – In the course of two years, several belvederes are built on the south side of Marjan at a location called Fairy's Courtyard (Vilini dvori).
- 1909 – Fire destroys a wooden inn on the first peak, but thanks to Varoš people a forest fire is prevented.
- 1910 – The association builds two bowling pitches at Marjan's first peak.
- 1910 – With membership contributions, the Marjan Association rebuilds and reopens the restaurant on the first peak.
- 1911 – The Marjan Association has more than 400 members.
- 1912 – The children's playground is built.
- 1913 – The association sets signs and labels with Croatian and Latin names of plants.
- 1913 – The association opens a new large restaurant with a 200 sqm hall and a balcony for musical performances.
- 1914 – Marjan forest is thriving so much that it has to be thinned to a healthy density.
- 1918 – The forest extends over more than 75 hectares.
- 1919 – Jakša Račić becomes the association's president and remains so for the next 25 years.
- 1921 – The association obtains a large number of palm trees from the island of Vis and plants them along the Račić pathway.
- 1922 – With the help of the municipality, stone stairways from the coast up to the Jewish cemetery are built, while the path to St Nicholas is paved and flanked by a stone wall.
- 1923 – Rabbit hunting is organized on the northwestern cape.
- 1924 – The biggest rabbit chase in Dalmatian history is organized on Marjan, and 350 rabbits were caught in three days.
- 1924 – Works on the renovation of another peak begin. Bishop Klement Bonefačić visits the site and donates 400 dinars to the Marjan Association Fund. The cement factory Dalmatia from Kaštel Sućurac donates 10 cement wagons. In August of the same year, the works are completed along with the access to the first peak made of 378 white stone steps.
- 1925 – The Natural History Museum is founded; a large restaurant hall is divided to host the collection of stuffed mammals, birds, fish and shellfish. Professor Umberto Girometta becomes the curator of the Museum.
- 1926 – The zoo is opened, welcoming 3000 visitors on the very first day.
- 1926 – The entire forest of Marjan is encircled with a high wire fence.
- 1927 – A great drought affects Dalmatia; the association mulches Marjan plants with stones to prevent dehydration and organizes the supply of the irrigation water. Only one third of the plants are lost.
- 1928 – With the support of the city administration, a marine aquarium with 9 lighted pools is built in the eastern part of the Museum.
- 1929 – The association places several stone panels throughout Marjan with Luka Botić's and Jerolim Kavanjin's interpretive texts.
- 1939 – Guests from a cruise ship donate an alligator to the zoo.
- 1941 – The last Assembly of the association is held prior to the Occupation and the Second World War. The association has 45 members.
- 1944 – The painter Emanuel Vidović becomes the president of the association.
- 1945 – After the war, the only surviving inhabitants of the zoo are the alligator and a black bear. The Old Jewish Cemetery is closed and preserved as a monument. Jewish burials begin to take place in the Jewish section of the Lovrinac cemetery in the east of the city.
- 1951 – The association obtains work permission from the Communist authorities.
- 1953 – A campaign is conducted and the association succeeds in bringing water to the first peak.
- 1954 – New huts are built on Bene and on the Saddle (Sedlo), while the Belvedere at the Jewish cemetery gets a kiosk–buffet.
- 1963 – A large exhibition about Marjan and its significance is held in the Split City Museum.
- 1964 – Through the persistent effort of the association, Marjan is declared an area of Special Protected Nature.
- 1970 – A Marjan forest census records 115,265 trees.
- 1975 – The zoo is visited by more than 120,000 people.
- 1977 – The association opposes the construction on the slopes of the hill and succeeds in preventing a broadcasting center (RTV) being built on the northern slopes.
- 1978 – The Marjan Association is decorated for its merits with the Golden Emblem of the City of Split.
- 1990 – In collaboration with the Association of Friends of Cultural Heritage, the Marjan Association restores the church of St. Nicholas.
- 2001 – The association issues a comprehensive publication on Marjan, with experts compiling chapters on history, forestry, sports, traffic, geology and the overall meaning of Marjan for Split.
- 2004 – The association renews a stone house in the Botanical Garden built in 1913 (it now houses the Public Institution for the Management of Marjan Forest Park).
- 2004 – Thanks to the association and Split MPs, the Croatian Parliament votes the establishment of the Public Institution for the Management of Marjan Forest Park, whereby the City of Split becomes responsible for the management of Marjan Forest Park.
- 2005 – The association restores Marangunić walkway.
- 2007 – At the request of the association and other organisations and individuals, bars on the First Belvedere plateau are fixed preventing cars parking in the area.
- 2013 – A 10-meter-tall (33 ft) white cross was unveiled next to the platform on the highest peak of Marjan hill.
- 2024 – A 19-meter-tall (62 ft) observation deck was opened to the public on the Marjan's second tallest peak.

== Image gallery ==
Sunset on beach Bene located in Marjan

Sunset on Marjan coast

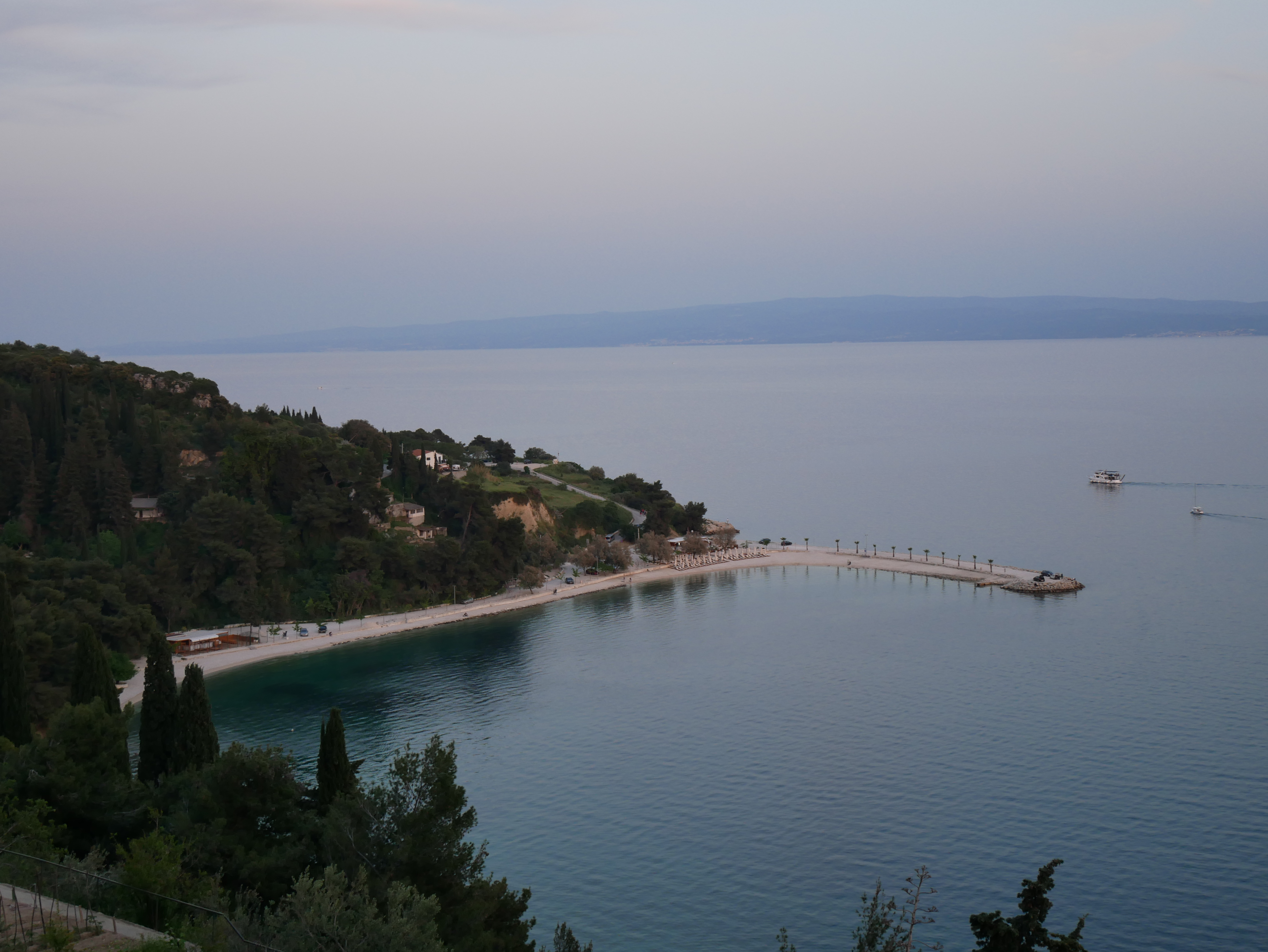
View of Beach Kasjuni from Marjan hill

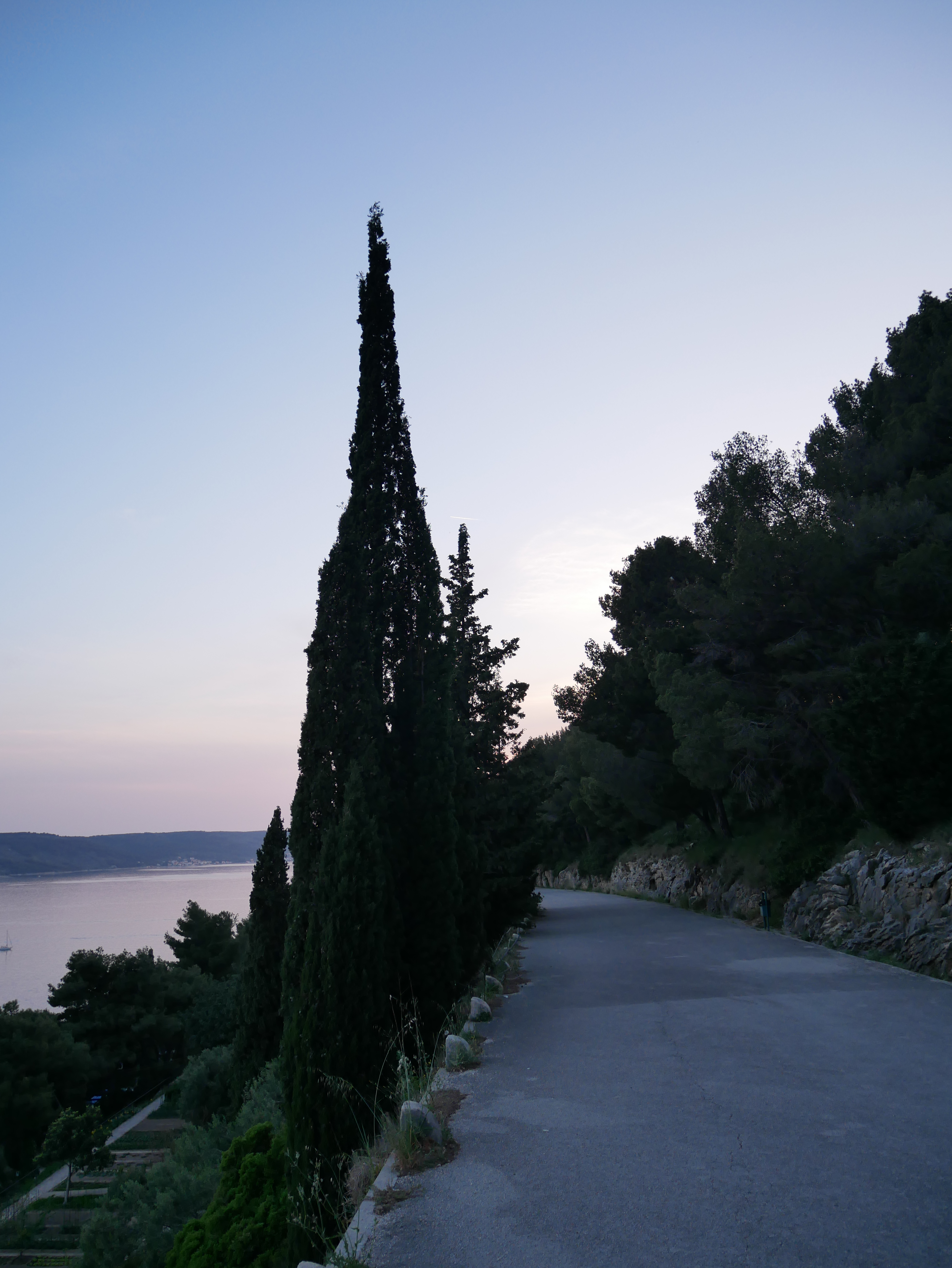
Bicycle path

Night view of Split from Marjan

Beach Kasjuni

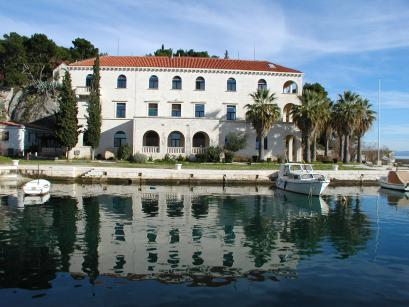
Oceanography Institute

== See also ==
- Split
- Jadro River
- Marjane, Marjane
