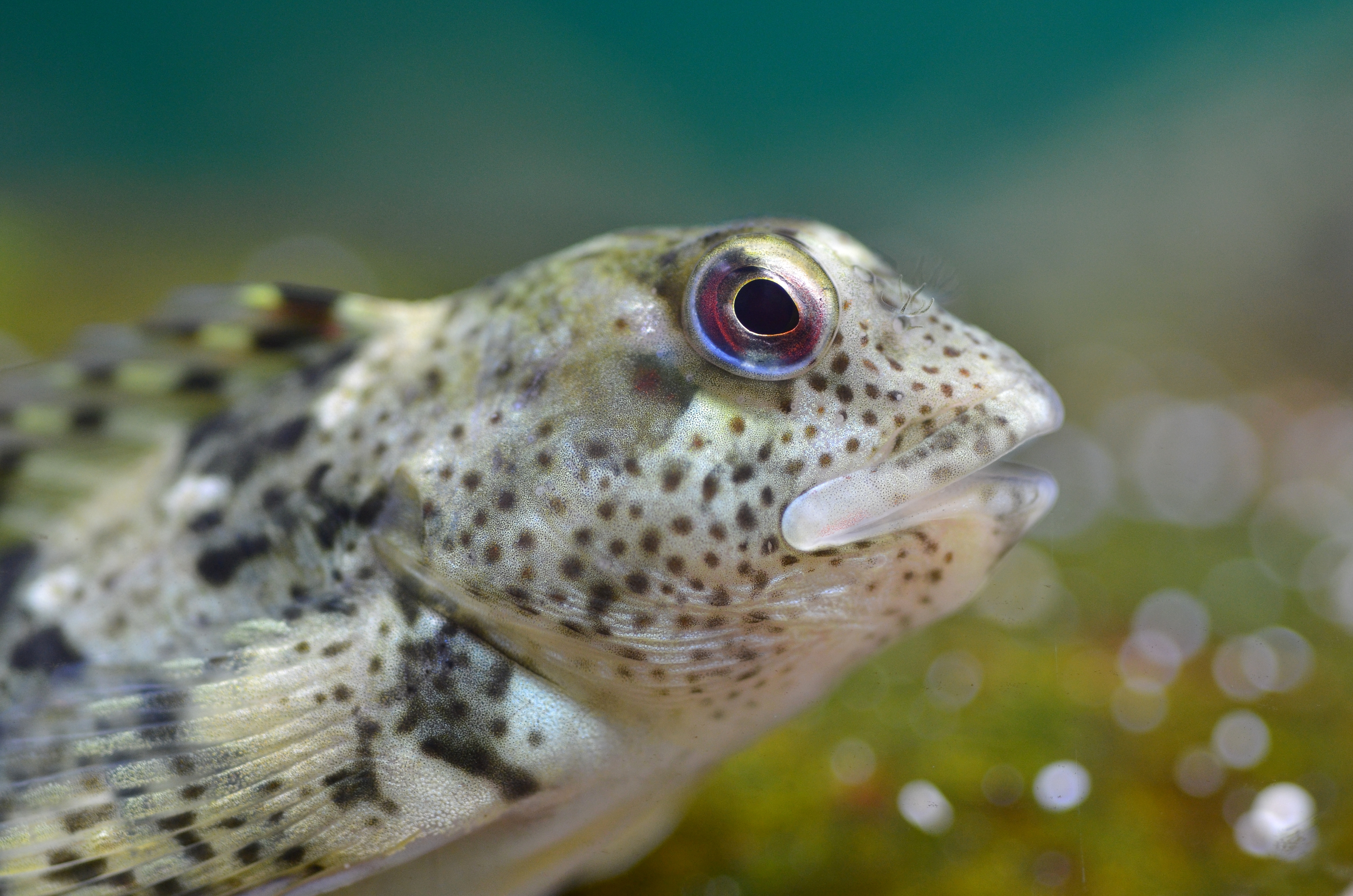

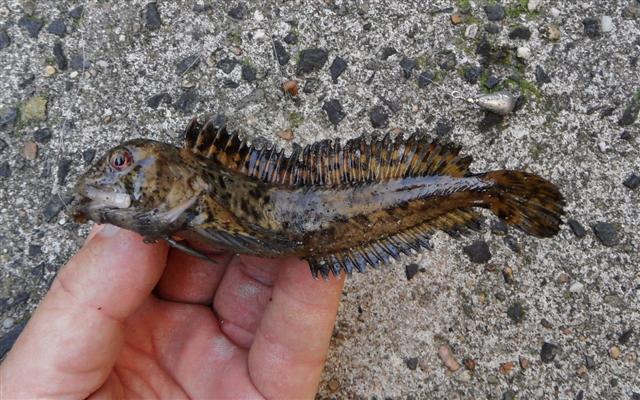

Conservation status
- Least Concern (IUCN 3.1)

Scientific classification
- Kingdom: Animalia
- Phylum: Chordata
- Class: Actinopterygii
- Division: Teleostei
- Order: Blenniiformes
- Family: Blenniidae
- Genus: Lipophrys
- Species: L. pholis

Binomial name
- Lipophrys pholis (Linnaeus, 1758)

Synonyms
- Blennius bufo (Lowe, 1843); Blennius pholis Linnaeus, 1758; Lipophris pholis (Linnaeus, 1758); Pholis bufo Lowe, 1843; Pholis carolinus Valenciennes, 1836; Pholis laevis Fleming, 1828

= Lipophrys pholis =

Shanny

Species of fish

Lipophrys pholis, commonly known as shanny, also known as the smooth blenny or common blenny, is a species of combtooth blenny. It matures at two years of age. Distributed in the Eastern Atlantic from the southern Norway to Morocco and Madeira, including the Mediterranean and the Balearics. Lipophrys pholis feed primarily on crustaceans, but also feed on other invertebrates and plants.

== Description ==
Lipophrys pholis has an elongated body which measures up to 16 centimetres (6.3 in) in length. It is the typical blenny shape having an elongated body and a rather large and blunt head with relatively large eyes set high on its head and as they age they grow a fleshy ridge on the forehead. The background colour is brownish, marked with green or yellow spots and they have dark spots arranged in 5–6 vertical bars along the body with a single large black spot near the origin of the dorsal fin. The background colour can vary depending on the surrounding habitat and individuals vary from blotched, dark brown to blackish. The males change in colour to being all black with a contrasting white mouth and a pale blue margin to the dorsal fin when in breeding condition.

== Distribution ==
Lipophrys pholis has a wide distribution in the north-eastern Atlantic Ocean and the western Mediterranean. It extends from Norway to Morocco and Madeira and in to the Mediterranean as far east as the Balearic Islands. It is very common around the coasts of Britain and Ireland.

== Habitat and biology ==
The shanny is an intertidal species which displays homing behavior and which occurs along rocky coasts in shallow waters. This species can stay out of water sheltering under rocks or seaweeds. It is largely diurnal at high tide and it can breathe air when exposed by the ebbing tide. They prefer to remain in rockpools at low tide and will only shelter in crevices or under boulders if they cannot return to a favoured pool. Its food consists of small benthic invertebrates, especially snails, barnacles and amphipods, as well as some algae. Less important in its diet are crabs, polychaetes, isopods, copepods, limpets, mussels and other small molluscs.

This species is oviparous: the female laying eggs which are 1.5 mm in diameter. The eggs are demersal and adhere to the substrate. Spawning occurs in the warmer months of April to August. The male and female mate in pairs, the male mates with several females and guards all of their eggs. Each female spawns three times in a season. The eggs are laid under rocks in the intertidal zone and the young can be common on shorelines in the autumn.
