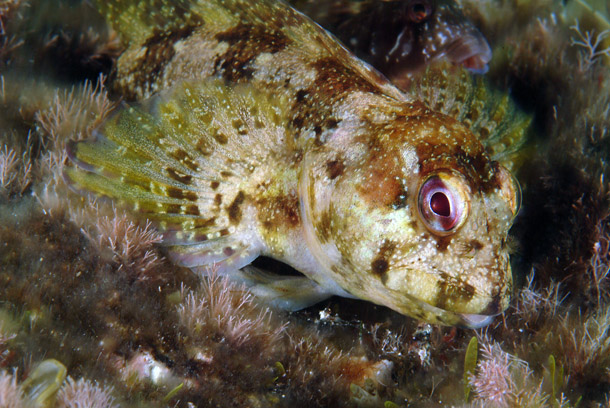

Conservation status
- Least Concern (IUCN 3.1)

Scientific classification
- Kingdom: Animalia
- Phylum: Chordata
- Class: Actinopterygii
- Order: Blenniiformes
- Family: Blenniidae
- Genus: Lipophrys
- Species: L. trigloides

Binomial name
- Lipophrys trigloides (Valenciennes, 1836)

Synonyms
- Blennius trigloides Valenciennes, 1836; Lipophrys sabry Bath, 1983; Paralipophrys trigloides (Valenciennes, 1836); Pholis trigloides (Valenciennes, 1836)

= Lipophrys trigloides =

Species of fish

Lipophrys trigloides is a species of combtooth blenny. Distributed in the Eastern Atlantic along the coasts of France (Brittany), the Iberian Peninsula, Morocco, the Mediterranean and the Sea of Marmara southwards to Senegal, the Canary Islands and Madeira. Marine subtropical demersal fish, up to 13 cm length.
