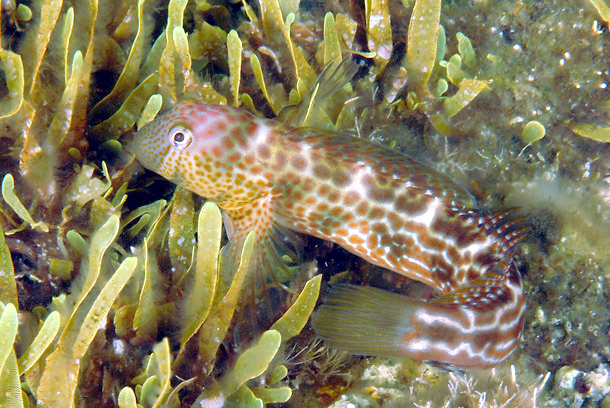

Conservation status
- Least Concern (IUCN 3.1)

Scientific classification
- Kingdom: Animalia
- Phylum: Chordata
- Class: Actinopterygii
- Order: Blenniiformes
- Family: Blenniidae
- Genus: Microlipophrys
- Species: M. canevae

Binomial name
- Microlipophrys canevae (Vinciguerra, 1880)

Synonyms
- Blennius canevae Vinciguerra, 1880; Microlipophrys canevae Vinciguerra, 1880; Lipophrys heuvelmansi Charousset (fr), 1986

= Microlipophrys canevae =

Species of fish

Microlipophrys canevae is a species of combtooth blenny found in the northeast Atlantic Ocean near Portugal and in the Mediterranean Sea. This species grows to a length of 7.5 centimetres (3.0 in) TL.

A previously undescribed species of combtooth blenny was described from the Adriatic Sea by the French ichthyologist François Charrousset (fr) from two specimens and given the name Lipophrys heuvelmansi. However, in 2015 a comparison of these specimens with specimens of M. canevae showed that L. heuvelsmani was a junior synonym of this species.

The specific name honours the friend of Vincuguerra's, Giorgio Caneva, whose work encouraged Vinciguerra to study blennies from the Gulf of Genoa and led to the description of this species.
