= Najbolji hrvatski tamburaši =

Croatian tambura group

Najbolji Hrvatski Tamburaši
- Also known as: Zlatni Dukati (1983–1997)
- Origin: Županja, Croatia
- Genres: Tambura, Folk
- Years active: 1983–present
- Labels: Croatia Records
- Members: Denis Špegelj (prim), Stanko Šarić (basprim), Krunoslav Golubičić (čelo), Mato Miličić (kontra), Mato Lukačević (bas)
- Past members: Hrvoje Majić (deceased), Mirko Gašparović (deceased 2025), Zoran Bucković, Zdravko Šljivac, Željko Miloš, Mario Pleše, Marijan Majdak, Petar Nikolić, Krešimir Bogutovac (Stipa), Šima Dominković, Andrija Miličić, Josip Dominković
- Website: najboljihrvatskitamburasi.com/index.htm

Najbolji Hrvatski Tamburaši (English: Best Croatian Tambura Players), known until 1997 as Zlatni Dukati (English: Golden Ducats), is a Croatian tambura group.

== History ==
The group was formed in 1983 as Zlatni Dukati. Their first album, Ni sokaci nisu što su nekad bili, was released by Jugoton (now Croatia Records). The original members were: Zoran Bucković (prim), Stanko Šarić (basprim), Zdravko Šljivac (basprim), Željko Miloš (Jinx) (čelo), Mario Pleše (kontra), Mato Lukačević (bas), Marijan Majdak (vocals).

In this lineup, the group performed for one season. Then, Mato Lukačević and Stanko Šarić continued under the name Zlatni Dukati, joining a group of tambura players from their hometown of Štitar. Led by Šima Dominković, the lineup included: Andrija Miličić, Mato Miličić, Mirko Gašparović, Josip Dominković, Mato Lukačević, and Stanko Šarić, and later Hrvoje Majić joined. Until 1985, they performed in the area around Županja. The group disbanded due to disagreements.

A year later, Mato Lukačević, in collaboration with Krešimir Bogutovac – Stipa, reassembled the group with: Petar Nikolić (violin), Hrvoje Majić (prim), Mirko Gašparović (basprim), Krešimir Bogutovac (Stipa) (basprim), Mato Miličić (Pišta) (kontra), Mato Lukačević (bas). This lineup also performed in the Županja area, notably with a regular engagement at the tavern restaurant "Kristal" in 1986 and 1987. At the end of 1986, Stanko Šarić rejoined the group, and Petar Nikolić left. In the summer of 1987, the group began performing throughout Croatia with the help of the music agency "Lira" from Čakovec.

The same year, collaboration was arranged with composer Josip Ivanković, resulting in the album Nek zvone tambure released in 1988. After disagreements with the collaboration method with Josip Ivanković, in mid-1988, Krešimir Bogutovac Stipa left the group, and the remaining five continued the collaboration with Ivanković, producing a series of albums.

During a tour organized by the Croatian Fraternal Union from the USA, the idea was born to record an album of patriotic songs Hrvatska pjesmarica, which significantly contributed to the popularization of the group and tambura music in general. This was also a great contribution of the group to the liberation of the national spirit and the development and establishment of democratic relations in the then socialist Republic of Croatia.

After the Greater Serbian aggression on Croatia, in 1991, the group continued to record so-called "war songs", i.e., the album U meni Hrvatska, which, according to military experts at the time, raised the morale of Croatian defenders and civilians.

Collaboration with Josip Ivanković ended in 1996 after increasingly frequent disagreements and conflicts, which are still awaiting a court epilogue due to Ivanković's lawsuits and demands. Due to the above, in 1997, at the suggestion of representatives of the record label Croatia Records, the group changed its name to Najbolji Hrvatski Tamburaši. Despite the name change, the group continued to work successfully, resulting in albums Vranac (the last released under the name "Zlatni Dukati"), Nek me pamte gradovi, Hrvatske pjesme iz Bosne i Hercegovine, Sedam dana, Divne godine, Tamburica od javora suva, Sretan Božić, and Nostalgija.

In 1999, the group was struck by the suicide of longtime prim player Hrvoje Majić, after which the remaining members continued working. Denis Špegelj from Virovitica joined in place of the deceased Majić, replacing him starting from the album Sedam dana.

In June 2006, a new member, cellist Krunoslav Golubičić, joined the group, and from his arrival, NHT operated in the lineup: Stanko Šarić (basprim 1, lead vocal), Denis Špegelj (prim), Mirko Gašparović (basprim 2), Krunoslav Golubičić (čelo), Mato Miličić (Pišta) (kontra), Mato Lukačević (bas).

In July 2007, the group celebrated 20 years of work. This anniversary coincided with the release of two golden collections by Croatia Records, containing a cross-section of the group's work to date.

The next album Slavonijo, biseru Hrvatske was released in 2010. This was the first album of the group awarded the discographic award Porin in the category "Best Tambura Music Album", while the song "Što te Sokol nije volio" won the award in the category "Best Folk Song".

2012 was marked by the celebration of 25 years of the group's professional activity. On this occasion, a celebratory concert was held on November 14 in the Vatroslav Lisinski Concert Hall in Zagreb. The concert was deliberately held two days before the final verdict of the Hague Tribunal to generals Ante Gotovina and Mladen Markač and four days before the anniversary of the occupation of Vukovar. The concert was content-wise dedicated to that moment, so a large part of the repertoire related to songs that depicted the audience's mood towards the mentioned events. The concert was released the following year as a live album Najbolji hrvatski tamburaši – 25 godina.

Later, the group turned to releasing singles accompanied by music videos: "Zaboravio bih", "Bez tebe mi ne miriše cvijeće", "Sve ću prodat sutra", and "Teško mi je bez Klobuka".

On November 24, 2017, they held a celebratory concert for 30 years of work in Lisinski Hall in Zagreb. Shortly after, an album with songs from the concert was released.

In September 2025, Mirko Gašparović suddenly passed away. No statement has been made regarding a new potential basprim player.

The band has been noted for building a professional career in tambura music and contributing to its revival during political changes in Croatia.

== Band members ==
- Stanko Šarić – first basprim, lead vocal
- Mato Lukačević – bas
- Krunoslav Golubičić – tambura čelo
- Mato Miličić (Pišta) – kontra
- Denis Špegelj – prim

Former members:

- Mario Pleše
- Zoran Bucković
- Zdravko Šljivac
- Željko Miloš
- Marijan Majdak
- Petar Nikolić
- Hrvoje Majić (deceased 1999)
- Krešimir Stipa Bogutovac (deceased 2015)
- Šima Dominković
- Andrija Miličić
- Josip Dominković
- Mirko Gašparović (deceased 2025)

== Discography ==
§ – covers

=== Studio albums ===
==== Zlatni Dukati ====
- Ni sokaci nisu što su nekad bili (1983, Jugoton)
- Nek zvone tambure (1988, Jugoton)
- Pjevaj kad duša boli (1989, Jugoton)
- Hrvatska pjesmarica (1989, ?) §
- Dao bih zlatne dukate (1990, Jugoton)
- Horvatska domovina (1990, Croatia Records) §
- U meni Hrvatska (1991, Croatia Records) § with original songs
- Klasika (1991, Croatia Records) §
- Da su meni krila laka (1993, Croatia Records)
- Sretan Božić (1993, Croatia Records) §
- Starogradska pjesmarica (1994, Croatia Records) § with original songs
- Od dvora do dvora (1994, Croatia Records)
- Suživot (1995, Croatia Records)
- Vranac (1996, Croatia Records)

==== Najbolji Hrvatski Tamburaši ====
- Nek me pamte gradovi (1998, Croatia Records)
- Hrvatske pjesme iz Bosne i Hercegovine (1999, Croatia Records) §
- Sedam dana (2001, Orfej, Croatia Records, Brodfest, Zlatne Žice)
- Divne godine (2003, Croatia Records)
- Tamburica od javora suva (2004, Croatia Records)
- Sretan Božić (2005, Croatia Records) § with original songs
- Nostalgija (2007, Croatia Records)
- Slavonijo, biseru Hrvatske (2010, Croatia Records)
- 25 godina (2013, Mirna Aria)
- 50 originalnih pjesama (2017, Croatia Records)
- 30 godina (2018)
- 21 lice ljubavi (2020)
- Odlazim (2021)

=== Compilations ===
==== Zlatni Dukati ====
- 16 zlatnih hitova (1992, Croatia Records)
- Prvi hitovi (2001, Croatia Records)
- Zlatna kolekcija - Zlatni dukati (2007, Croatia Records)

==== Najbolji Hrvatski Tamburaši ====
- Zlatna kolekcija - Najbolji hrvatski tamburaši (2007, Croatia Records)

=== Non-album songs ===
List of songs the group recorded during their career that did not appear on any album

- A ti se nećeš vratiti (2009)
- Pjesmo naša (feat. Đuka Čaić, Mišo Kovač, Đani Stipaničev, Dražen Žanko, Mladen Grdović, Adam Končić & Vinko Coce) (2009)
- Gdje su stare tambure (2008)
- Zaštiti svoj san (feat. Giuliano) (2007)
- Ljubavi jedina (2007)
- Oj, pastiri (2004)
- Zerdelija (2004)
- Sveto tlo Hrvatsko (feat. Ivan Mikulić, Thompson & Tiho Orlić) (2002)
- Slavonski konji (feat. Dario Plevnik & Time Out) (1999)
- Ti nisi više kao prije (1997)
- Kad me jednom krene karta (1997)
- Tiho teče Drava (1995)
- Fratello (feat. Pađen Band) (1993)
- Dalmatinski šajkaš (1992)
- Otvori prozor (1992)
