= Microlipophrys velifer =

Sailfin blenny

Conservation status
- Least Concern (IUCN 3.1)

Scientific classification
- Kingdom: Animalia
- Phylum: Chordata
- Class: Actinopterygii
- Division: Teleostei
- Order: Blenniiformes
- Family: Blenniidae
- Genus: Microlipophrys
- Species: M. velifer

Binomial name
- Microlipophrys velifer (Norman, 1935)

Synonyms
- Blennius elongatus Cadenat, 1951; Blennius velifer Norman, 1935; Lipophrys velifer (Norman, 1935)

Species of fish

Microlipophrys velifer, the sailfin blenny is a species of combtooth blenny found in the eastern Atlantic ocean off west Africa from Mauritania and Cape Verde to the Cunene River, Angola.

== Description ==
This species grows to a length of 5.8 centimetres (2.3 in) TL. The dorsal fin has 12 spines and 15 to 16 rays while the anal fin has two spines and 16 to 18 rays. The species inhabits rocky intertidal zones both protected and unprotected from the waves. The species lay eggs that are attached in holes in rocks.
