= Juraj Kolombatović =

Croatian zoologist

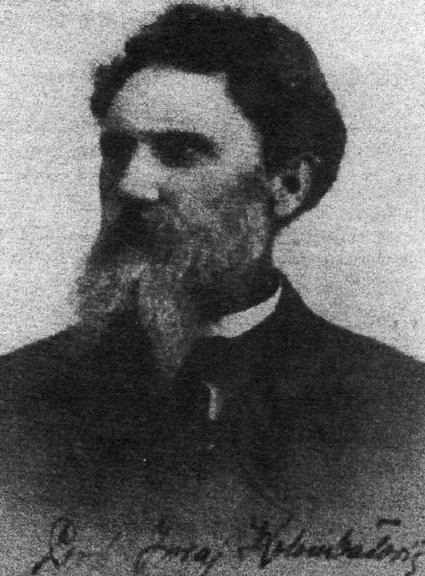
- Born: 8 December 1843; Split, Kingdom of Dalmatia, Austrian Empire
- Died: 21 September 1908 (aged 64); Split, Kingdom of Dalmatia, Austria-Hungary

Juraj Kolombatović (8 December 1843 - 21 September 1908) was a Croatian zoologist, best known for his work in the field of ichthyology and the Marjan hill reforestation project.

A high school professor from 1864 to 1900, Kolombatović is remembered for his discovery of nine new species of fish and in 1886, he described a species of lizard - Dinarolacerta mosorensis - the Mosor rock lizard, the goby Gobius kolombatovici is named in his honour. In addition, in 1852 an afforestation project was launched planting Aleppo pine on Marjan, and he participated in the founding of the Marjan society in 1903.
