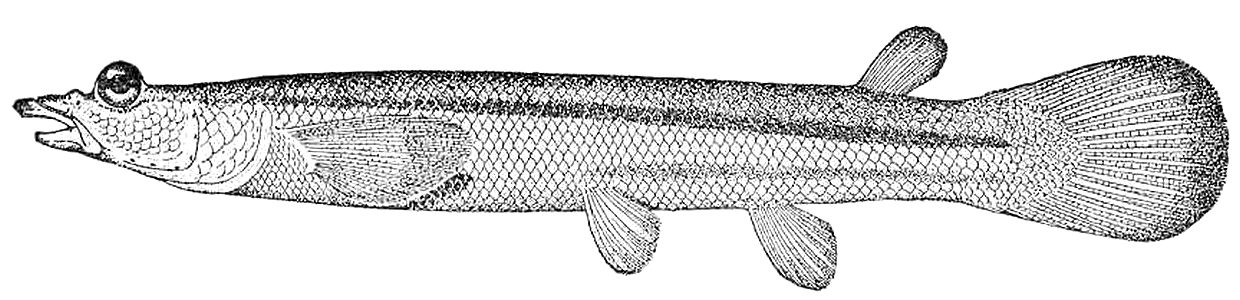
- Four-eyed Fish, Anableps dovii Gill. Tehuantepee, Mexico

Conservation status
- Least Concern (IUCN 3.1)

Scientific classification
- Kingdom: Animalia
- Phylum: Chordata
- Class: Actinopterygii
- Order: Cyprinodontiformes
- Family: Anablepidae
- Genus: Anableps
- Species: A. dowii

Binomial name
- Anableps dowii (T. N. Gill, 1861)

Synonyms
- Anableps dowei T. N. Gill, 1861; Anableps dowi T. N. Gill, 1861; Anableps dovii T. N. Gill, 1861

= Anableps dowii =

Species of fish

Anableps dowii, the Pacific four-eyed fish or the cuatrojos, is a species of four-eyed fish native to the coastal waters on the Pacific side of southern Mexico to Nicaragua. This fish is gregarious and inhabits mangrove swamps, tidal mudflats, and other coastal brackish ecosystems. This species has female biased sexual dimorphism, with males growing to 22 cm (8.7 in) TL while females can grow up to 34 cm (13.4 in) TL. The name "four-eyed fish" comes from how the eyes of the fish are split into two lobes horizontally, each with its own pupil and vision. This allows the fish to see above and below the water at the same time, aiding in predator detection and prey location.

== Taxonomy ==
The name "Anableps" comes from the Greek "ana", meaning "up", and "blepo", meaning "sight" or "glance". The species epithet comes from amateur naturalist Captain John Melmoth Dow, who collected the holotype for Anableps dowii.

Anableps dowii was described by Theodore N. Gill in 1861. Historically, the species has been spelled as Anableps dowei, Anableps dovii (latinizing the "w" to a "v"), and Anableps dowi. In 2019, Eschmeyer's Catalog of Fishes changed the scientifically accepted species name from A. dowei to A. dowii, for consistency, since other species named in honor of captain Dow are spelled "dowii," and concluded that the original description as "A. dowei" was a misspelling.

== Description ==
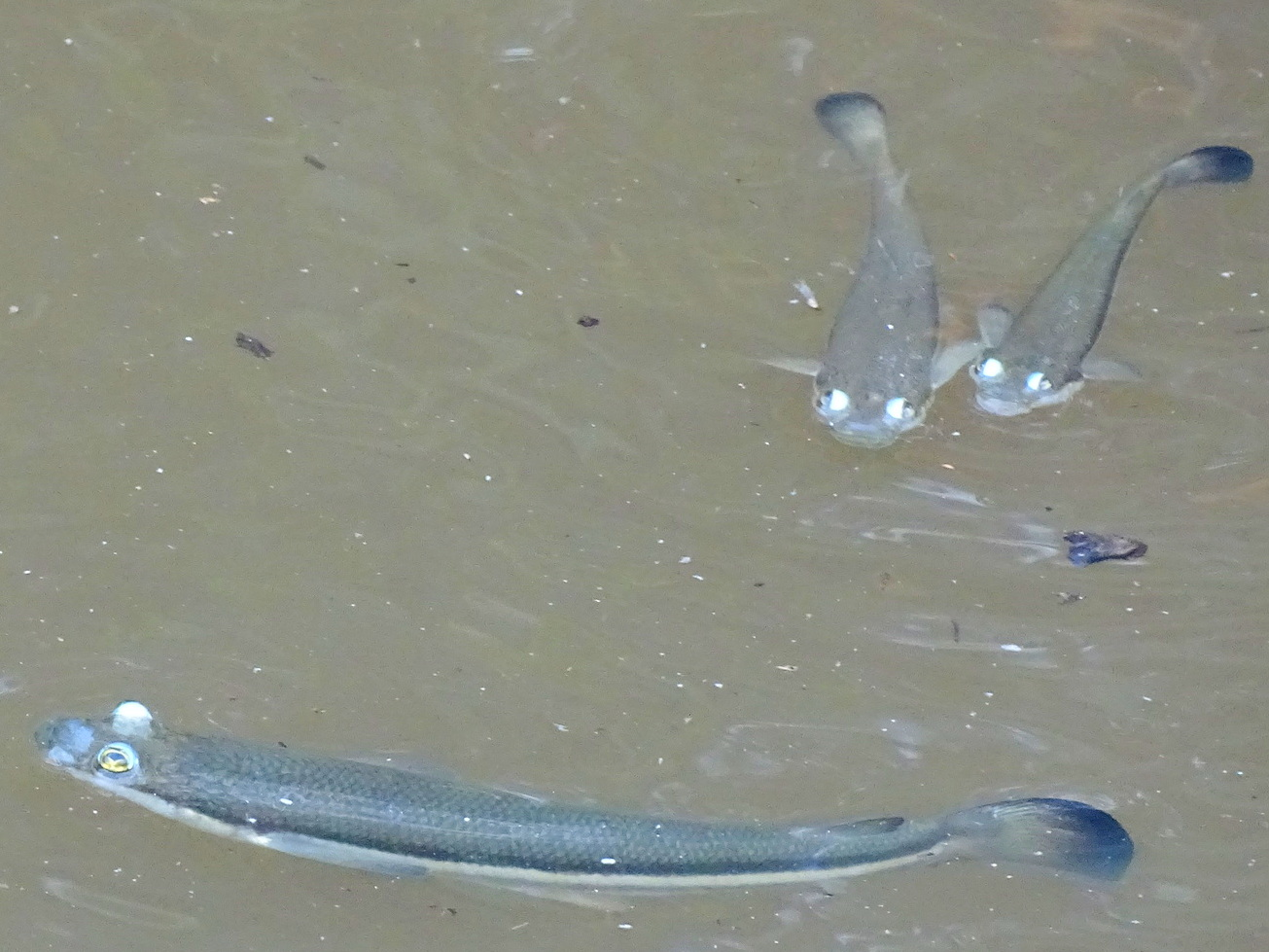
Pacific four-eyed fish (Anableps dowii) on iNaturalist

Anableps dowii has a slender, elongated body with large eyes that protrude from the top of the head. The cornea and irises of the eyes are horizontally divided into 2 differently-sized apertures: the larger, higher lobe is specialized for above-water vision, while the smaller, lower lobe is specialized for vision below water. The fish has specialized muscles enabling each eye to adjust its focus independently, enhancing its ability to adapt to both aerial and aquatic environments.A. dowii has a dark brown body, with a broad, cream-colored stripe runs along the sides and a yellow ventral surface. The species possesses a single, small, posteriorly-positioned dorsal fin with 7-10 rays, large, paddle-like pectoral fins, abdominally-placed pelvic fins, an anal fin specialized into a gonopodium in mature males, and a large, rounded caudal fin.

Anableps dowii can be differentiated from the other members of the genus Anableps, A. anableps and A. microlepis, by their Pacific distribution (A. anableps and A. microlepis have Atlantic distributions) and the presence of a cream-colored stripe along the side of the body.

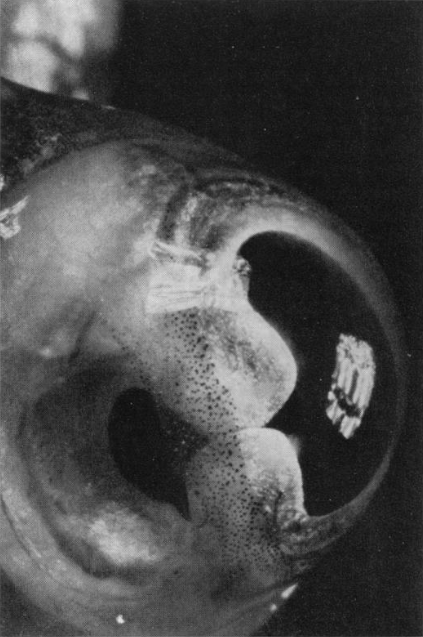
Close-up of Anableps dowii eye to show iridal flaps and overlying pigmented corneal band (X25). Long aperture (right) is above-water; smaller one (left) is submerged.

== Ecology ==
Anableps dowii is insectivorous. During low tide, they will crawl onto shore to eat algae and other organic matter. The species stays at the surface of shallow water (1-5m), with the air-adapted lobe of its eyes staying out of the water, occasionally diving to prevent the upper eyes from desiccation. The species inhabits sparsely vegetated to unvegetated waters, with soft substrate (sand, mud). A. dowii typically inhabits water with a temperature between 24-28 degrees. The species forages at night for insects and invertebrates. The species will jump out of the water in order to catch insects flying above water, which doubles as threat evasion. Jumping is expressed by large, primarily female individuals; smaller individuals may express threat evasion by diving down, away from the water's surface.

Anableps dowii engages in schooling behavior. Younger individuals will form schools of 10 to 200 individuals, while larger adults will occur singly or in small groups.

== Reproduction ==
Anableps dowii is viviparous, bearing live young. The male has a prominent, tubular gonopodium used to impregnate females during mating. The gonopodium develops from the male anal fin, and indicates gonadal maturity in males. As with other members of Anablepinae, this species is livebearing and has left or right leaning genitals to prevent inbreeding. Whether the male gonopodium leans left or right in a given individual is determined stochastically, not derived genetically or due to environmental factors. Females can give birth to more than 14 individuals per brood.

Anableps dowii is the most primitive member of its genus, which is reflected in its production of incomplete sperm packets as opposed to free sperm that the other Anableps members produce.

Anableps dowii breeds year-round. In El Salvador, the species has expressed seasonal variability in reproduction, peaking in May. Reproduction has been observed in lagoons, which may serve as nursery habitat for juveniles.

== Distribution ==
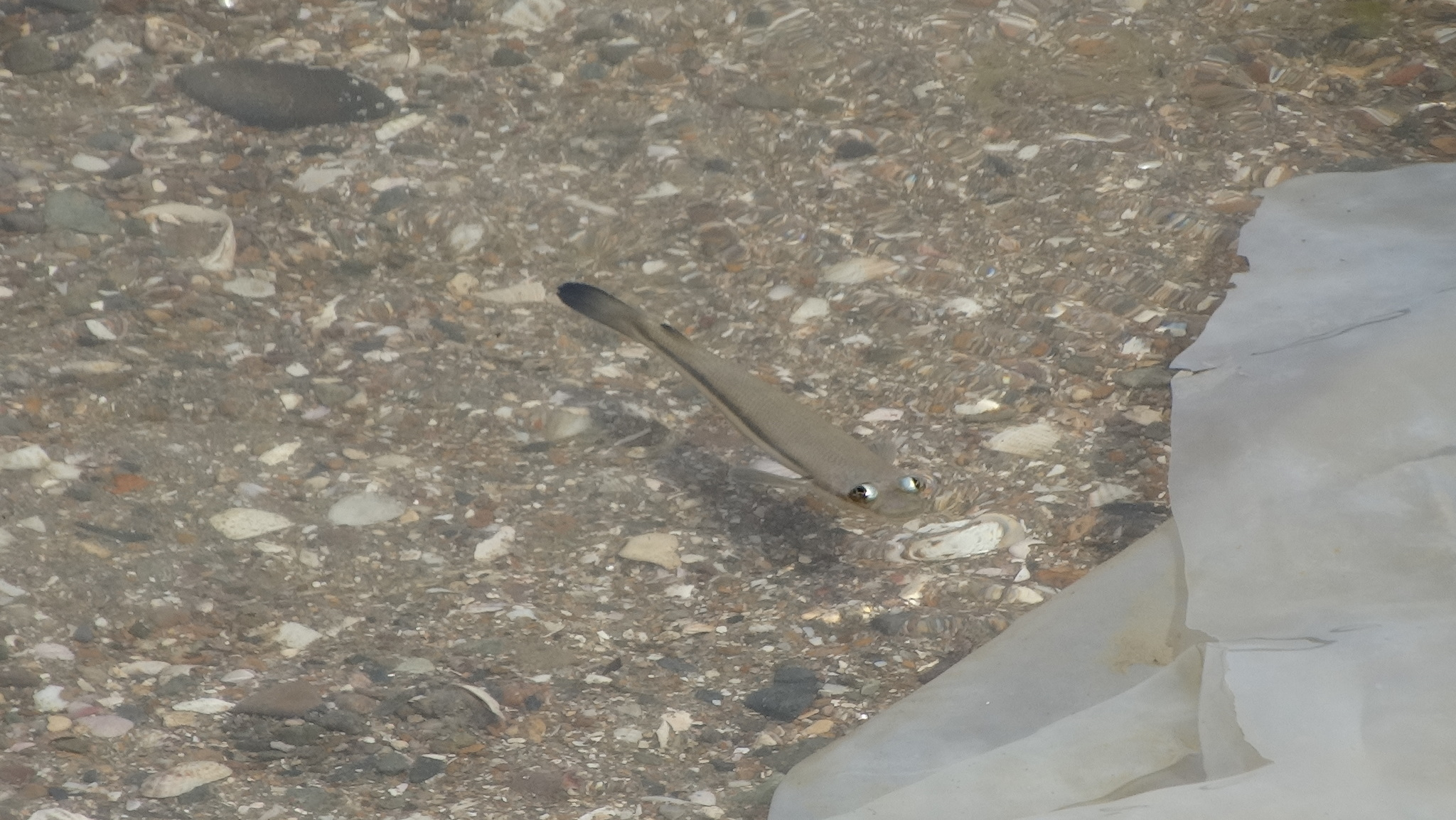
Pacific four-eyed fish (Anableps dowii) on iNaturalist

Anableps dowii ranges as far north as the basin of the Rio Tehuantepec, Oaxaca, Mexico, and as far south as Nicaragua, spanning the countries of Mexico, Guatemala, El Salvador, Honduras, and Nicaragua. The species inhabits waters ranging from inland freshwater canals and tributaries to estuaries and brackish coastal lagoons. Elevationally, the species ranges from sea level (0m) to 670m in Honduras.

== Importance to humans ==
Anableps dowii is eaten throughout its range. In Guatemala, fishermen value A. dowii for having delicate, sweet flesh. Additionally, the species is relevant to optics research owing to its unique eye adaptations.

== Conservation status ==
Anableps dowii was assessed in 2018 by the IUCN as Least Concern. Threats affecting the species include dam construction, habitat degradation, and potential overfishing.
