= Pinkeye (disambiguation) =

Pinkeye or Pink Eye may refer to:

- Conjunctivitis, an inflammation of the outermost layer of the eye and the inner surface of the eyelids
- Infectious bovine keratoconjunctivitis, an infectious conjunctivitis in cattle caused by the bacterium Moraxella bovis
- "Pinkeye" (South Park), an episode of the television series
- Pink Eye (film), a 2008 American horror film
- Pinkeye, a minor character from the novel Animal Farm
- Pinkeye mullet (Trachystoma petardi), a species of fish
- Solanum tuberosum 'Pink Eye', a potato cultivar
