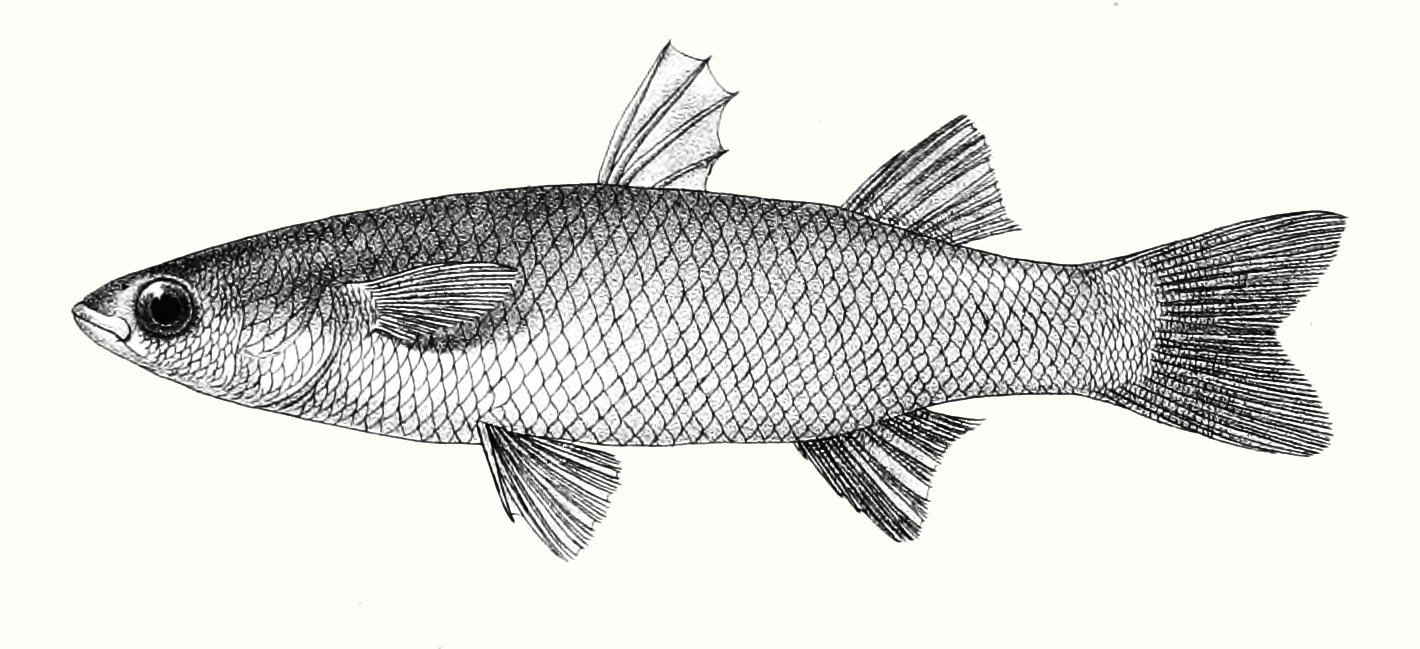

Scientific classification
- Kingdom: Animalia
- Phylum: Chordata
- Class: Actinopterygii
- Order: Mugiliformes
- Family: Mugilidae
- Genus: Sicamugil; Fowler, 1939
- Species: S. hamiltonii

Binomial name
- Sicamugil hamiltonii (Day, 1870)

Synonyms
- Mugil hamiltonii Day, 1870

= Burmese mullet =

Species of ray-finned fish

The Burmese mullet (Sicamugil hamiltonii) is a species of freshwater ray-finned fish, a mullet belonging to the family Mugilidae. It is the only species in the genus Sicamugil. It is found in the drainage systems of the Sittang and Irrawaddy rivers in Myanmar.

== Etymology ==
The Mullet is named in honor of Francis Hamilton-Buchanan (1762–1829).
