= Mesocosm =

Study in a controlled natural environment

Diagram of a small form closed system mesocosm

Different components of a successful mesocosm

A mesocosm (meso- or 'medium' and -cosm 'world') is any outdoor or indoor experimental system that examines the natural environment under controlled conditions. In this way mesocosm studies provide a link between field surveys and highly controlled laboratory experiments.

Mesocosms tend to be medium-sized to large (e.g., aquatic mesocosm range: 1 litre (34 US fl oz) to 10,000 litres (2,600 US gal)+) and contain multiple trophic levels of interacting organisms.

In contrast to laboratory experiments, mesocosm studies are normally conducted outdoors in order to incorporate natural variation (e.g., diel cycles). Mesocosm studies may be conducted in either an enclosure that is small enough that key variables can be brought under control or by field-collecting key components of the natural environment for further experimentation. In coastal and aquatic ecology, specialized mesocosms can also be designed to reproduce wave climates, allowing experiments on hydrodynamic effects on organisms, sediments, and biogeomorphic processes.

Extensive mesocosm studies have been conducted to evaluate how organisms or communities might react to environmental change, through deliberate manipulation of environmental variables, such as increased temperature, carbon dioxide or pH levels.

== Advantages ==
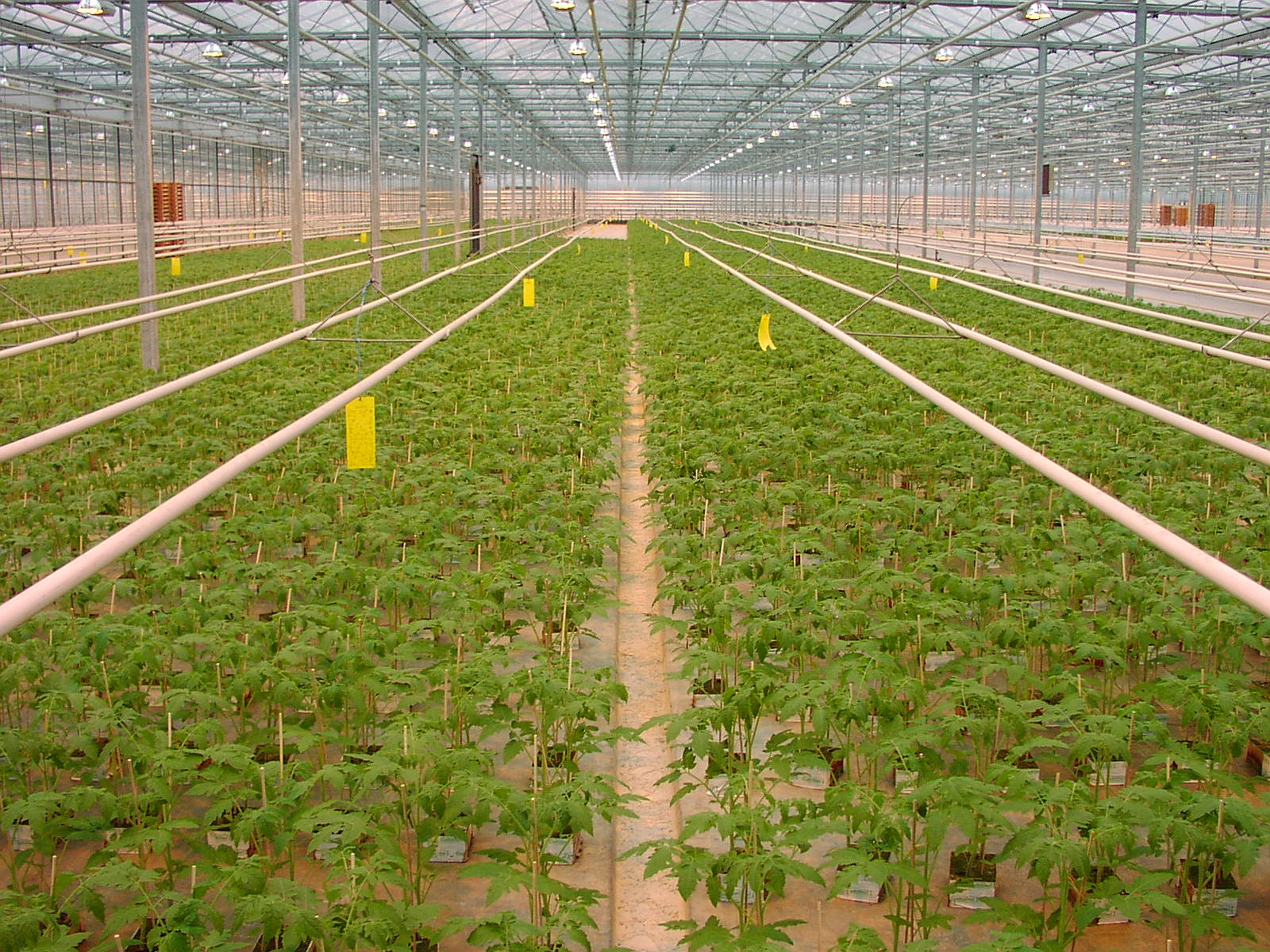
A tomato greenhouse in the Netherlands.

The advantage of mesocosm studies is that environmental gradients of interest (e.g., warming temperatures) can be controlled or combined to separate and understand the underlying mechanism(s) affecting the growth or survival of species, populations or communities of interest. By manipulating gradients (e.g., climate variables) mesocosm studies can extend beyond available data helping to build better models of the effects of different scenarios. Mesocosm experiments also tend to include replication of different treatment levels.

Manipulating something can give an idea as to what to expect if something were to occur in that ecosystem or environment. For indoor mesocosms, growth chambers grant greater control over the experiment. When plants are placed in a growth chamber, the air, temperature, heat and light distribution can be manipulated and the effects of being exposed to different amounts of each factor can be observed.

Greenhouses also contribute to mesocosm studies although sometimes, it may induce climate change, interfering with the experiment and resulting in inefficient data.

== Disadvantages ==
Using growth chambers for a laboratory experiment is sometimes a disadvantage due to the limited amount of space. Another disadvantage to using mesocosms is not adequately imitating the environment, causing the organism to avoid giving off a certain reaction versus its natural behavior in its original environment.

== Examples ==
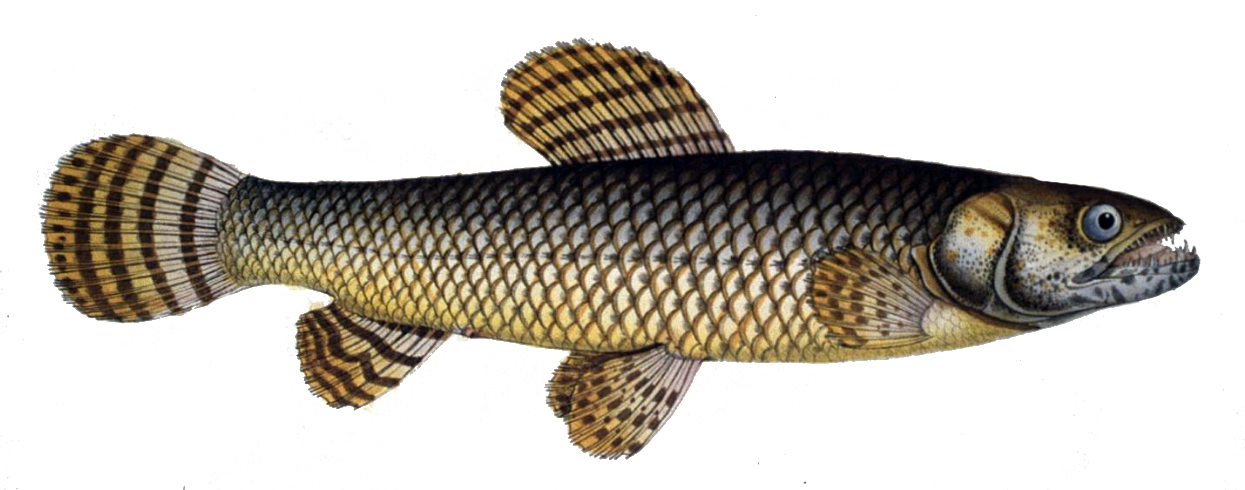
A Hoplias malabaricus fish.

Mazzeo and colleagues examined the eating habits of Hoplias malabaricus fish when exposed to different amounts of phytoplankton, zooplankton, and competition. Three months prior to conducting the experiment, they maintained an average precipitation, air temperature, and overall subtropical environment. Using 12 units, they filled them with aquifer water, sand and plants and kept them in isolation until the environment became suitable for phytoplankton to emerge. After careful preparation, Mazzeo et al. began the experiment dividing those units into categories of a control (zooplankton and phytoplankton) and 3 experiments: (Jenynsia multidentata with zooplankton and phytoplankton), (juvenile Hoplias malabaricus with zooplankton and phytoplankton), and (Large Hoplias malabaricus, Jenynsia multidentata, zooplankton, and phytoplankton) and observed biomass differences within different conditions.

Flanagan and McCauley tested the effects of climate warming on carbon dioxide concentration on shallow ponds by creating an eight-cylinder shaped in situ mesocosms. They divided it into four controls and four experiments on University of Calgary's campus pond. Those mesocosms contained openings underneath and were submerged at the same depth as the pond. By carefully sustaining the sediments and temperature from any changes, the production of zooplankton and algae were successful. After manipulation (pumping heat into water), they measured the sediments at the bottom of the pond for carbon dioxide concentration. After collecting data and analyzing it, Flanagan and McCauley concluded that due to the warming of the environment in the pond, carbon dioxide from the pond will increase into the surroundings, in turn, decreasing the amount of carbon dioxide within the sediments, indirectly modifying the carbon cycle of that ecosystem.

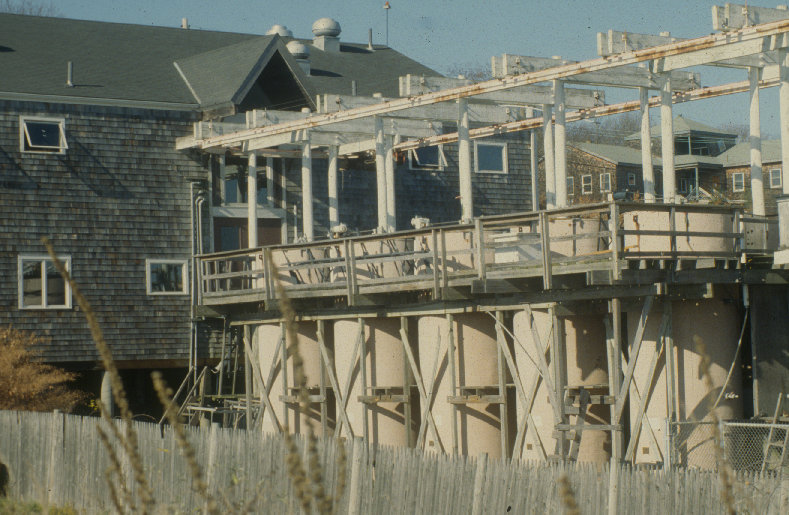
The Marine Ecosystems Research Laboratory (MERL) mesocosms are 8 metres (26 ft 3 in) deep and 7 cubic metres (250 cu ft) in volume. The mesocosm tanks were designed to match the average depth of the adjacent West Passage of Narragansett Bay, from which they draw their water. MERL is located at 41.491764°N 71.420651°W off South Ferry Rd. in Narragansett, Rhode Island.

Mesocosms are useful for studying the fate of pollutants in marine environments as well as providing the ability to conduct controlled manipulative experiments that could not be undertaken in natural marine environments. Since 1976, the Marine Ecosystems Research Laboratory (MERL) at the University of Rhode Island has been conducting pollution studies and experimental marine ecological studies using mesocosm tanks drawing water from nearby Narragansett Bay.

Mesocosms have also been used to study how the diversification of three-spined sticklebacks influences trophic communities and other ecosystem processes.
