= Paramugil parmatus =

Conservation status
- Least Concern (IUCN 3.1)

Scientific classification
- Kingdom: Animalia
- Phylum: Chordata
- Class: Actinopterygii
- Division: Teleostei
- Order: Mugiliformes
- Family: Mugilidae
- Genus: Paramugil
- Species: P. parmatus

Binomial name
- Paramugil parmatus Cantor, 1849

Species of fish

Paramugil parmatus, commonly known as the broad-mouthed mullet, is a species of bony fish belonging to the family Mugilidae. It was first described by Theodore Cantor in 1849.

== Description ==
Paramugil parmatus has a deeply compressed body posteriorly. The head is wider than deep and flattened dorsally. The adipose eyelid is poorly developed, and the hind tip of the maxilla is exposed when the mouth is closed. The second dorsal and anal fins are pointed but not falcate, while the caudal fin is emarginate. The margins of the caudal fin are slightly darkish. The scales are ctenoid. The head and body are silvery, greenish or olive brown dorsally, with 5–6 indistinct, dusky longitudinal stripes on the body.

== Habitat and distribution ==
Paramugil parmatus inhabits shallow coastal waters and enters estuaries and rivers. It is native to the Andaman Sea, the eastern Indian Ocean, and the Western Pacific Ocean.
