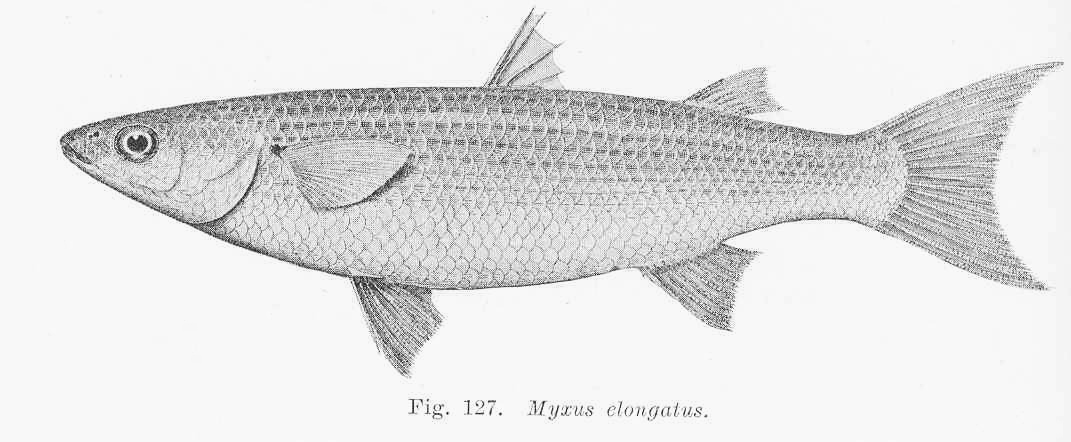

Scientific classification
- Kingdom: Animalia
- Phylum: Chordata
- Class: Actinopterygii
- Division: Teleostei
- Order: Mugiliformes
- Family: Mugilidae
- Genus: Myxus; Günther, 1861
- Species: M. elongatus

Binomial name
- Myxus elongatus Günther, 1861

= Sand grey mullet =

Species of fish

The sand grey mullet (Myxus elongatus) is a species of mullet found in coastal marine waters of Australia.

== Description ==
As general mullet, fish they have a terminal mouth with thick lips, 2 dorsal fins, a lunate homocercal caudal fin (upper lobe and lower lobe are equal length) and do not have a lateral line organ, which is usually used for detecting changes in their surroundings. The cycloid (smooth outer edge) scales of the sand grey mullet fish are thin, flexible and overlapping with a mix of silver and grey color scheme. They are easily identified by their bright yellow eyes.

They have a skeleton made of bone and have a streamline body shape for body undulations that allows them to be fast swimmers. Being constant swimmers required large amounts of oxygen which is achieved by water passing over their gills, which are in place of lungs to still have a large surface area through the various grooves in the gill tissue. The oxygen is obtained when they exhale and the water is pushed through their pharynx. Their blood flows in the opposite direction (countercurrent exchange) of the water over the gills in able to remove the maximum amount of oxygen from the water. They use a swim bladder to adjust their buoyancy by changing the volume of gas in the bladder to keep an overall constant volume for the bladder at different depths.

They are known for their texture and strong fish flavor when cooking. Around the age of 2 to 3 years they reach their full mature size making them ready to reproduce. The growth between the sexes differ, as females are typically longer averaging 255 mm (10.0 in) while males grow to 230 mm (9.1 in). However, the maximum length recorded as 900 mm (35 in).

== Habitat ==
The sand grey mullet is found in Australia from fresh waters to estuarine of the temperate water regions in 1–10 m (0–30 ft) depth. They are mainly found in the wild traveling in schools of fish where they just swim together in a pack without an obvious leader, constant distance between each other, and starting and stopping at the same time. This is believed to be in order to reduce their chance of getting eaten by a predator by confusing the predator and decreasing the probability of getting eaten. They predator will still eat and some will die but the overall probability of each fish getting eaten decreases in a school system. The sand grey mullet is often fished for both commercial and recreational purposes for their meat and to be used as bait. Fishing regulations are not strict with only regulations on the different sizes of mesh nets acceptable.

== Reproduction ==
The sand grey mullet can spawn eggs from November to March, however, peak season is from January to March depending on the location they are living in. Their reproductive organs are different shapes and colors depending on the stage of development. As they grow older their reproductive organs become thinner and. Many ray-finned fish are known for being hermaphroditic but this is unknown about the sand grey mullet fish. They are known for only spawning in the ocean waters directly into the water column with little to no care for eggs. Most die during early stages of life but once developed they have a low mortality rate.

== Diet ==
They have teeth that are attached to fibrous strands instead of directly to the jaw bone, that help them eat phytoplankton, mollusks, and small crustaceans. The evolutionary adaption of a flexible jaw allows them to open their mouths larger and have more chance of catching phytoplankton to eat from the water.

== Taxonomy ==
The freshwater mullet and pinkeye mullet were previously referred to the same genus as the sand grey mullet, but several studies have found them to be generically distinct. The sand grey mullet fish is part of the family Mugilidae that are ray-finned fish (Actinopterygii).
