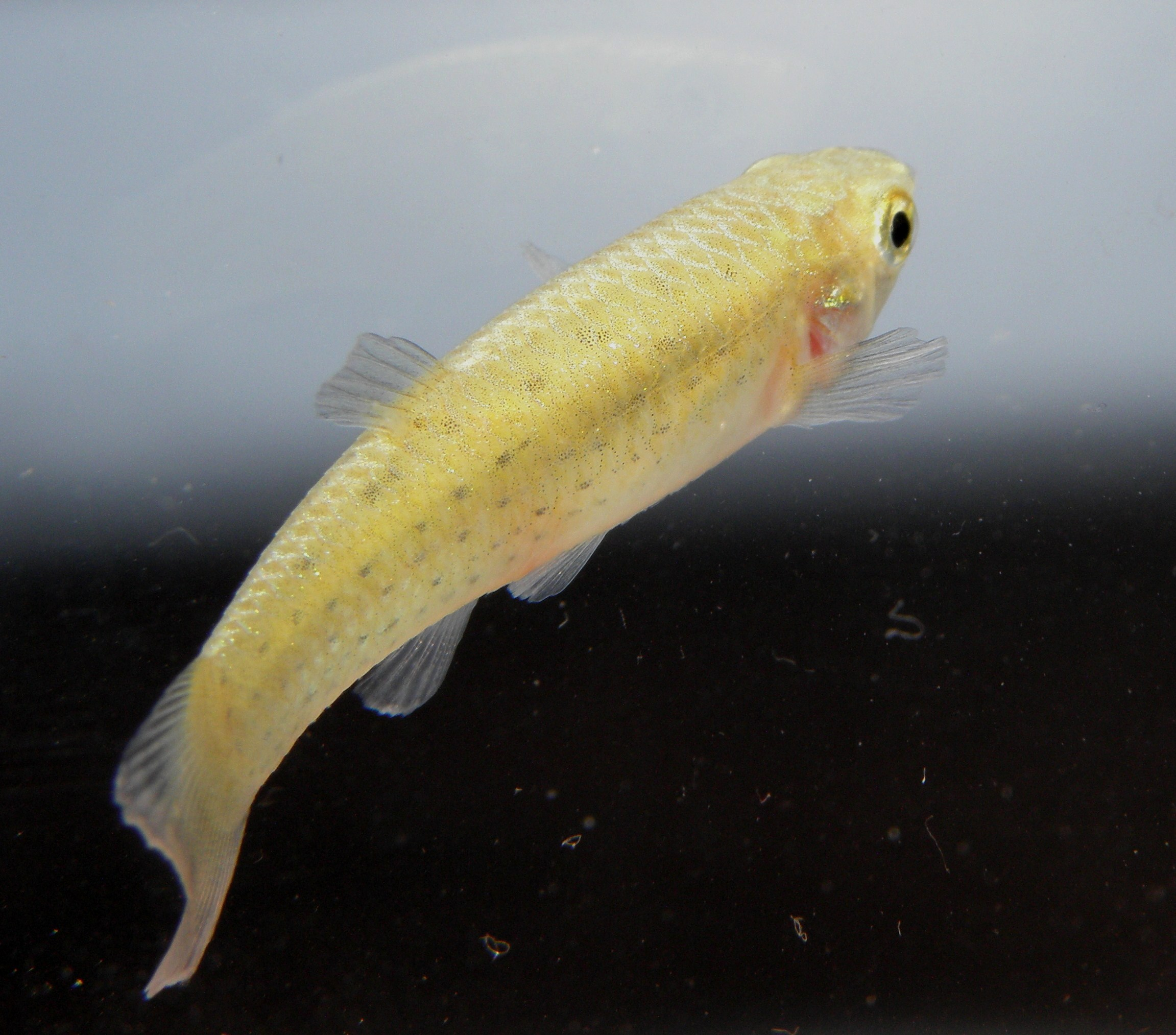
- Rio de la Plata onesided livebearer (Jenynsia multidentata).

Scientific classification
- Kingdom: Animalia
- Phylum: Chordata
- Class: Actinopterygii
- Division: Teleostei
- Order: Cyprinodontiformes
- Family: Anablepidae
- Subfamily: Anablepinae
- Genus: Jenynsia; Günther, 1866

Type species
- Lebias lineata Jenyns, 1842

Species
- 16, see text.

= Onesided livebearer =

Genus of fishes

Jenynsia is a genus of freshwater fishes in the family Anablepidae. Like Anableps species, they are onesided livebearers: some sources indicate that they only mate on one side, right-"handed" males with left-"handed" females and vice versa. However, other sources dispute this. These South American fish are viviparous.

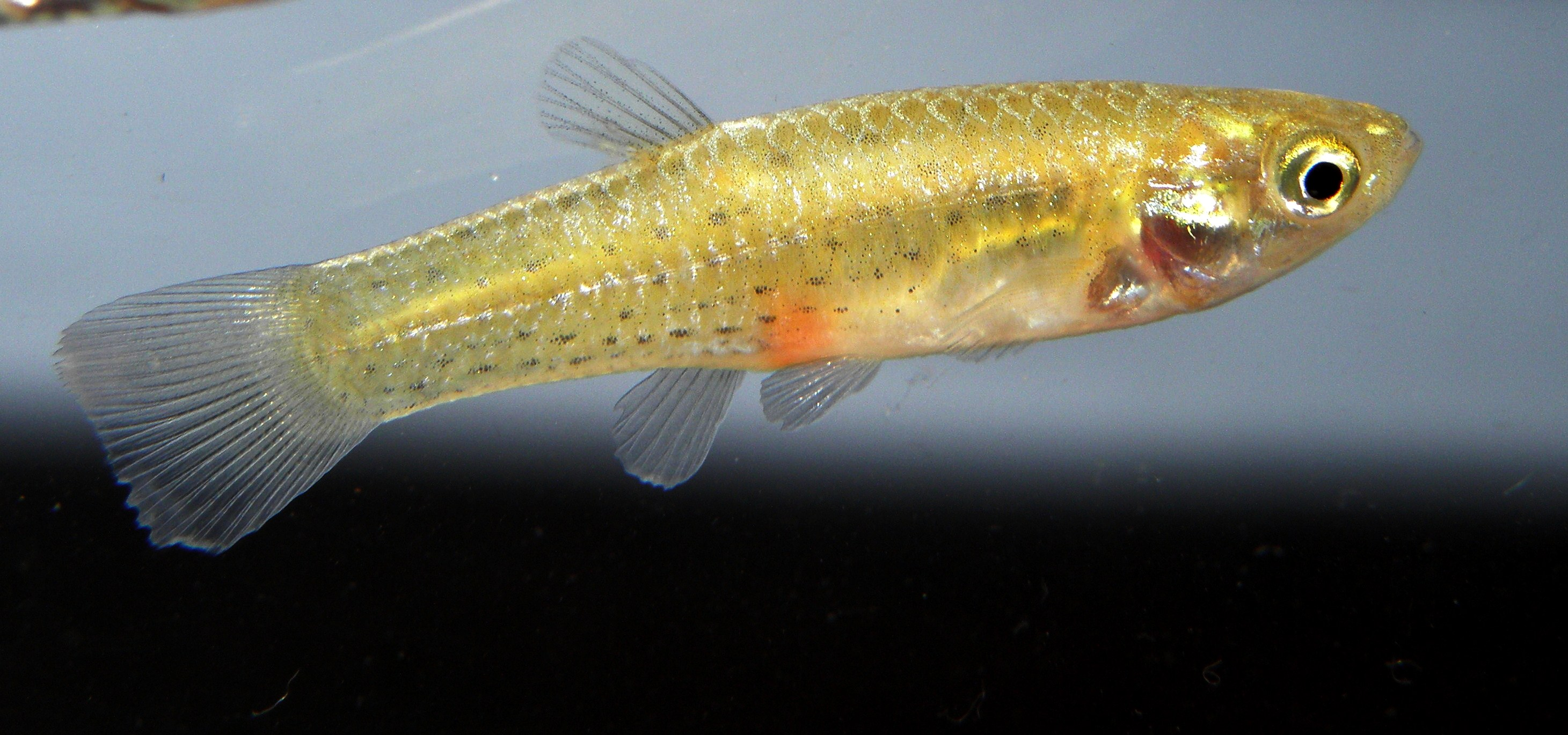
Rio de la Plata onesided livebearer (Jenynsia multidentata).

== Distribution ==
Species of the genus are distributed in the Río de la Plata Basin and Atlantic coastal drainages from Río Negro Province, Argentina, to the city of Rio de Janeiro, Brazil, and in the Andean drainages of northwest Argentina and southern Bolivia.

== Taxonomy ==
Jenynsia is the sister group to the genus Anableps and both are classified in the subfamily Anablepinae; together with the genus Oxyzygonectes they compose the family Anablepidae. Jenynsia contains two subgenera. Members of the subgenus Plesiojenynsia Ghedotti, 1998, are distributed in the uplands of southern Brazil. Members of the subgenus Jenynsia are more widely distributed in southern South America, with one species, J. sanctaecatarinae also found in the uplands of southern Brazil. Members of the two subgenera are partially sympatric in southeastern Brazil.

== Description ==
Unlike their cousins Anableps, their eyes are normal. Jenynsia species are diagnosable by the possession of an unscaled tubular gonopodium formed chiefly by the third, sixth, and seventh anal-fin rays and by the possession of tricuspid teeth in the outer mandibular series in adults. The maximum length in these species is up to 12 centimetres (5 in) in females and about 4 cm (2 in) in males.

== Species ==
There are currently 16 recognized species in this genus:

- Jenynsia alternimaculata (Fowler, 1940)
- Jenynsia aurea Hartmann, Wingert, Angrizani & Malabarba, 2026
- Jenynsia darwini Amorim, 2018
- Jenynsia diphyes Lucinda, Ghedotti & da Graҫa, 2006
- Jenynsia eigenmanni (Haseman, 1911)
- Jenynsia eirmostigma Ghedotti & S. H. Weitzman, 1995
- Jenynsia lineata (Jenyns, 1842) (Onesided livebearer)
- Jenynsia luxata Aguilera, Mirande, Calviño & Lobo, 2013
- Jenynsia maculata Regan, 1906
- Jenynsia obscura (Weyenbergh (de), 1877)
- Jenynsia onca Lucinda, R. E. dos Reis & Quevedo, 2002
- Jenynsia sanctaecatarinae Ghedotti & S. H. Weitzman, 1996
- Jenynsia sulfurica Aguilera, Terán, Mirande, Alonso, Rometsch, Meyer & Torres-Dowdall, 2019
- Jenynsia tucumana Aguilera & Mirande, 2005
- Jenynsia unitaenia Ghedotti & S. H. Weitzman, 1995
- Jenynsia weitzmani Ghedotti, A. D. Meisner & Lucinda, 2001

Synonyms

- Jenynsia multidentata (Jenyns, 1842) (Rio de la Plata onesided livebearer); valid as J. lineata
