= Lobed river mullet =

Conservation status
- Data Deficient (IUCN 3.1)

Scientific classification
- Kingdom: Animalia
- Phylum: Chordata
- Class: Actinopterygii
- Division: Teleostei
- Order: Mugiliformes
- Family: Mugilidae
- Genus: Cestraeus
- Species: C. plicatilis

Binomial name
- Cestraeus plicatilis MacLeay, 1883

Species of fish

The lobed river mullet (Cestraeus plicatilis), also known as ludong or banak, is a freshwater mullet. While it is claimed to be endemic to Cagayan River and tributaries extending through the watersheds of Cagayan Valley and the Santa-Abra River Systems of Ilocos Sur and Abra in the Philippines, verifiable and reliable sources have listed Celebes, New Caledonia, New Hebrides, and Fiji as areas where the lobed river mullet may also be found.

According to the BFAR, this fish is habituating in the deep pools of Addalem River in Aglipay, Quirino, and rapids of Didimpit in Lacab, Jones, Isabela.

== Description ==
The Ludong is herbivorous, eating only the filamentous algae that live on rocks and boulders in and near river rapids.

A mature fish weighs from 0.25 to 2 kg (0.55 to 4.41 lb) and costs P4,000- P5,000 a kilo, making it one of the most expensive fish in the country. It commands a very high price in the market because it is seasonal and difficult to catch. It is sometimes called as the "President's fish" because it was known as the favorite fish of former Philippine President Ferdinand Edralin Marcos.

This species is known for its unique taste and peculiar aroma when cooked. In fact, its unique taste makes it one of the most sought-after ingredients in making delicious dishes. A study in 2022, by Escaño, et al., was successful in identifying Ludong through genetic barcoding, as Cestraeus goldiei.

== Reproduction ==
This elusive fish is catadromous in nature; it migrates to the ocean to breed. It swims to salt water to spawn from October to December and returns to upstream ponds after. It undergoes upstream migration during December, January, and February, and this coincides with the "ipon-run phenomenon' wherein different species of fish fry also undergo upstream migration. After the ludong had undergone downstream migration, it can be caught in Cagayan River and tributaries.

== Conservation ==
Ludong is close to being an endangered species, considering its threatened state in the Northern Luzon waters. In fact, information gathered from fish vendors in Cagayan showed that the volume of ludong catch has been tremendously decreasing annually.

It was also observed that over the years, the sizes of ludong being caught are getting smaller. According to a BFAR report, the catch of ludong in 1998 weighed 2.4 kg (5.3 lb) and has gone to 0.25 kg (0.55 lb) in 2001. Moreover, no ludong was reportedly caught in 2002 and 2003 proving its declining population.

Owing to its scarcity and high value in the market, the desire to catch ludong increases causing overfishing and endangerment. This concern resulted in the issuance of Fisheries Administrative Order (FAO) No. 31 aimed at conserving the banak or ludong in Northern Luzon.

Specifically, FAO 31 prohibits the capture, purchase, sale, preparation, and serving of ludong for private or public consumption during its seasonal migration (October to January). It also prohibits the use of tabukol (a cast net of large meshes), tabak (small drag seine for river fishing) or pateng (cylindrical fish pot for catching mullet) in the Cagayan River and its tributaries and in the Santa-Abra River System during these months.

In 2006, BFAR launched Oplan Sagip Ludong, a wide fish-hunt in Aparri for 60 pieces of live ludong. The hunt was conducted during the first half of October because it provides the best opportunity to catch live ludong, which seasonally appears two to six times only in a year from October to November.

At the moment, the only live ludong in captivity is at BFAR research center in Bonuan Binloc in Dagupan City caught five years ago in the Cagayan River in Aparri town. It weighs 1.5 kilograms. This provides the researchers to study further this species and its breeding habits. The fish hunt resulted in the identification of at least 30 more "probable species" of ludong which BFAR researchers are now studying. Moreover, the live ludong in captivity was recently joined in by 40 fingerlings of fish which are being cultured at BFAR, undergoing further morphological identification. The live ludong was donated in 2001 and the fingerlings in January 2006 by Dr. Lino Edralim Lim for further studies on their physical traits and DNA fingerprinting. The results of these studies will form the basis for other captured fish which might be just ludong look-alikes.

== See also ==
- Cagayan River
