= Corsula =

Corsula may refer to:

- the Croatian town and former bishopric Korčula, now a Latin Catholic titular see
- species of the fish genus Rhinomugil (shark mullet)
