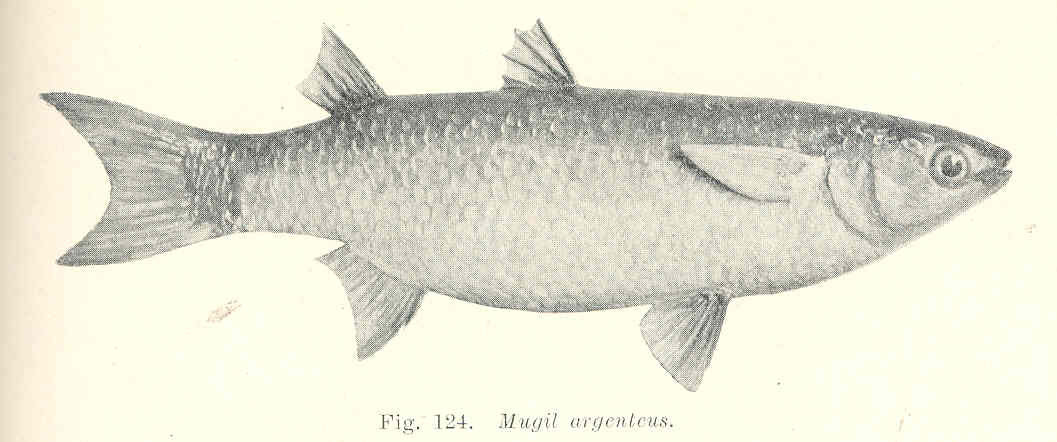

Scientific classification
- Kingdom: Animalia
- Phylum: Chordata
- Class: Actinopterygii
- Order: Mugiliformes
- Family: Mugilidae
- Genus: Gracimugil; Whitley, 1941
- Species: G. argenteus

Binomial name
- Gracimugil argenteus (Quoy & Gaimard, 1825)

Synonyms
- Mugil argenteus Quoy & Gaimard, 1825; Liza argentea (Quoy & Gaimard, 1825); Mugil ferrandi Valenciennes, 1836; Mugil peronii Valenciennes, 1836; Mugil australis Steindachner, 1879

= Flat-tail mullet =

Species of ray-finned fish

The flat-tail mullet (Gracimugil argenteus) is a species of grey mullet from the family Mugilidae. It is endemic to southern Australia where it forms schools in shallows, and lower estuaries, as well as in more saline lagoons. It spawns at sea but juveniles move into freshwater until they are a year old. It feeds on benthic microorganisms such as crustaceans and filamentous algae. It is caught as a food fish. It is the only species in the monospecific genus Gracimugil.
