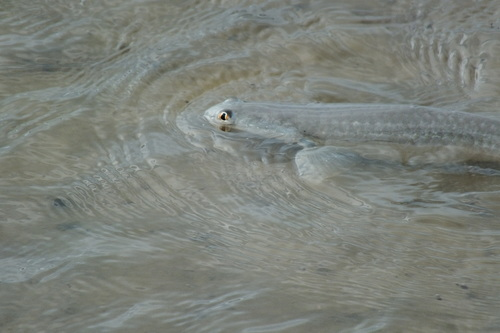

Scientific classification
- Kingdom: Animalia
- Phylum: Chordata
- Class: Actinopterygii
- Order: Mugiliformes
- Family: Mugilidae
- Genus: Squalomugil; Ogilby, 1908
- Species: S. nasutus

Binomial name
- Squalomugil nasutus (De Vis, 1883)

Synonyms
- Mugil nasutus De Vis, 1883; Rhinomugil nasutus (De Vis, 1883)

= Shark mullet =

Species of ray-finned fish

The shark mullet (Squalomugil nasutus), also known as the sharp-nosed mullet, popeye mullet, or skipjack mullet, is a species of ray-finned fish from the grey mullet family Mugilidae. It is found in Australia and New Guinea where it occurs in muddy freshwater habitats and mangroves, it feeds on algae and insects taken from the surface but also on benthic invertebrates. It can breathe air and sometimes moves over exposed mud by wriggling. It was formerly classified in the genus Rhinomugil, with the corsula (Rhinomugil corsula), but is now placed in its own monospecific genus, Squalomugil.
