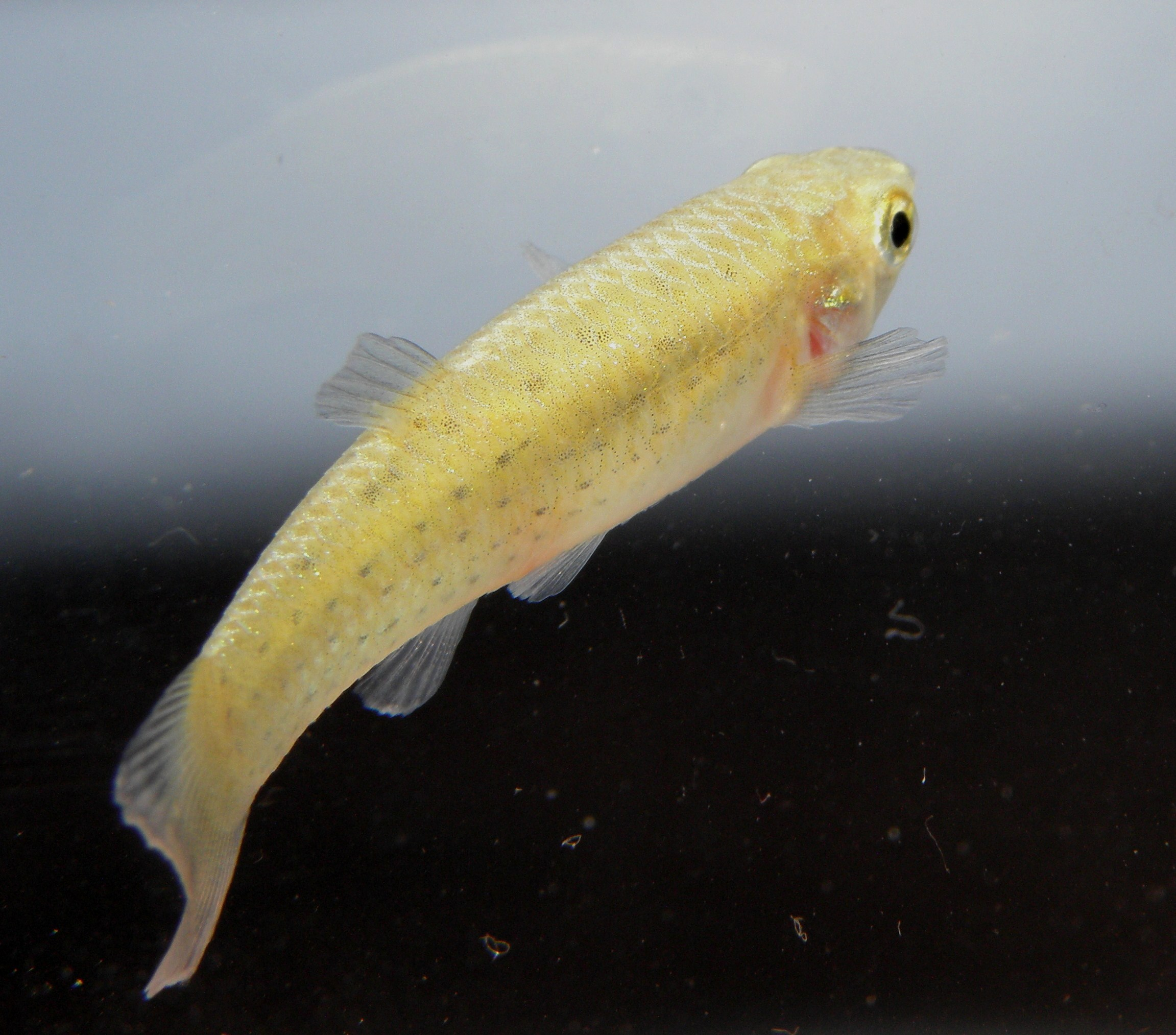
- Rio de la Plata onesided livebearer (Jenynsia multidentata).

Scientific classification
- Kingdom: Animalia
- Phylum: Chordata
- Class: Actinopterygii
- Division: Teleostei
- Order: Cyprinodontiformes
- Family: Anablepidae
- Genus: Jenynsia
- Species: J. multidentata

Binomial name
- Jenynsia multidentata (Jenyns, 1842)

Synonyms
- Lebias multidentata Jenyns, 1842; Fitzroyia multidentata (Jenyns, 1842); Poecilia punctata Valenciennes, 1846

= Jenynsia multidentata =

Species of fish

Jenynsia multidentata is a species of killifish from the family Anablepidae. It is a viviparous, benthopelagic species in the genus Jenynsia. They are onesided livebearers with a clear asymmetry of the males' genitalia. With onset of maturity, the anal fin of male fish develops into a gonopodium which can be brought forward on one side only. Based on the bending to the left or to the right of the tip of the gonopodium, two morphs of male fish can be distinguished.

== Taxonomy ==
The species Jenynsia multidentata was originally described in 1842 as Lebias multidentata by the naturalist Leonard Jenyns. Accepted synonyms are Fitzroyia multidentata also described by Jenyns in 1842 and Poecilia punctata which was suggested by Valenciennes in 1846.

== Geographical distribution ==
Jenynsia multidentata is the most widespread species of the genus Jenynsia. The distribution is ranging from the Atlantic coastal drainages from the Rio Negro Province (Argentina) to the city of Rio de Janeiro (Brazil).

== Diet ==
Jenynsia multidentata is an omnivorous-planktivorous fish which often occurs in high densities in (hyper)eutrophic shallow lakes and can feed on zooplankton, phytoplankton, periphyton, invertebrates as well as detritus.
