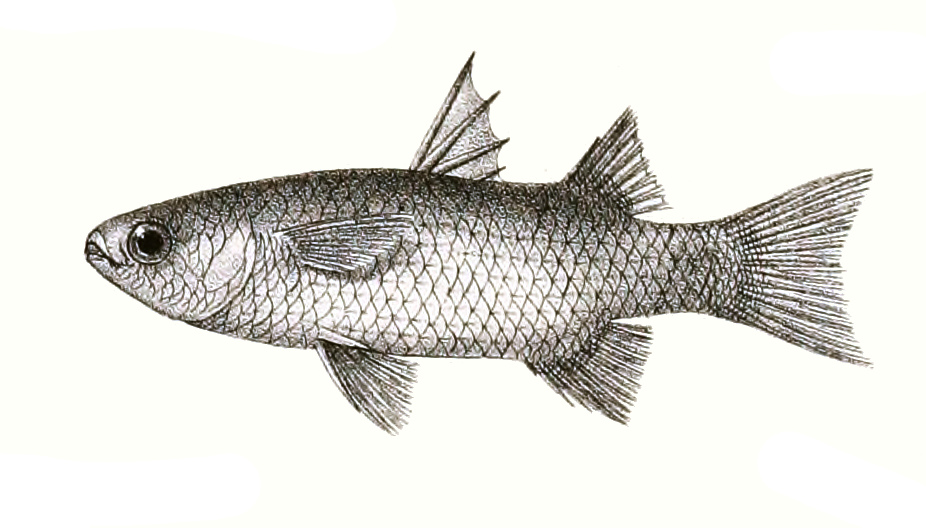
- Paramugil parmatus

Scientific classification
- Kingdom: Animalia
- Phylum: Chordata
- Class: Actinopterygii
- Order: Mugiliformes
- Family: Mugilidae
- Genus: Paramugil; Ghasemzadeh, Ivantsoff & Aarn, 2004

Type species
- Mugil parmatus Cantor, 1849

= Paramugil =

Genus of ray-finned fishes

Paramugil is a genus of mugilid mullets found in coastal waters, estuaries and rivers in the western Pacific region, ranging from the South China Sea to Australia.

== Species ==
There are currently two recognized species in this genus:

- Paramugil georgii (J. D. Ogilby, 1897) (Silver mullet)
- Paramugil parmatus (Cantor, 1849) (Broad-mouthed mullet)
