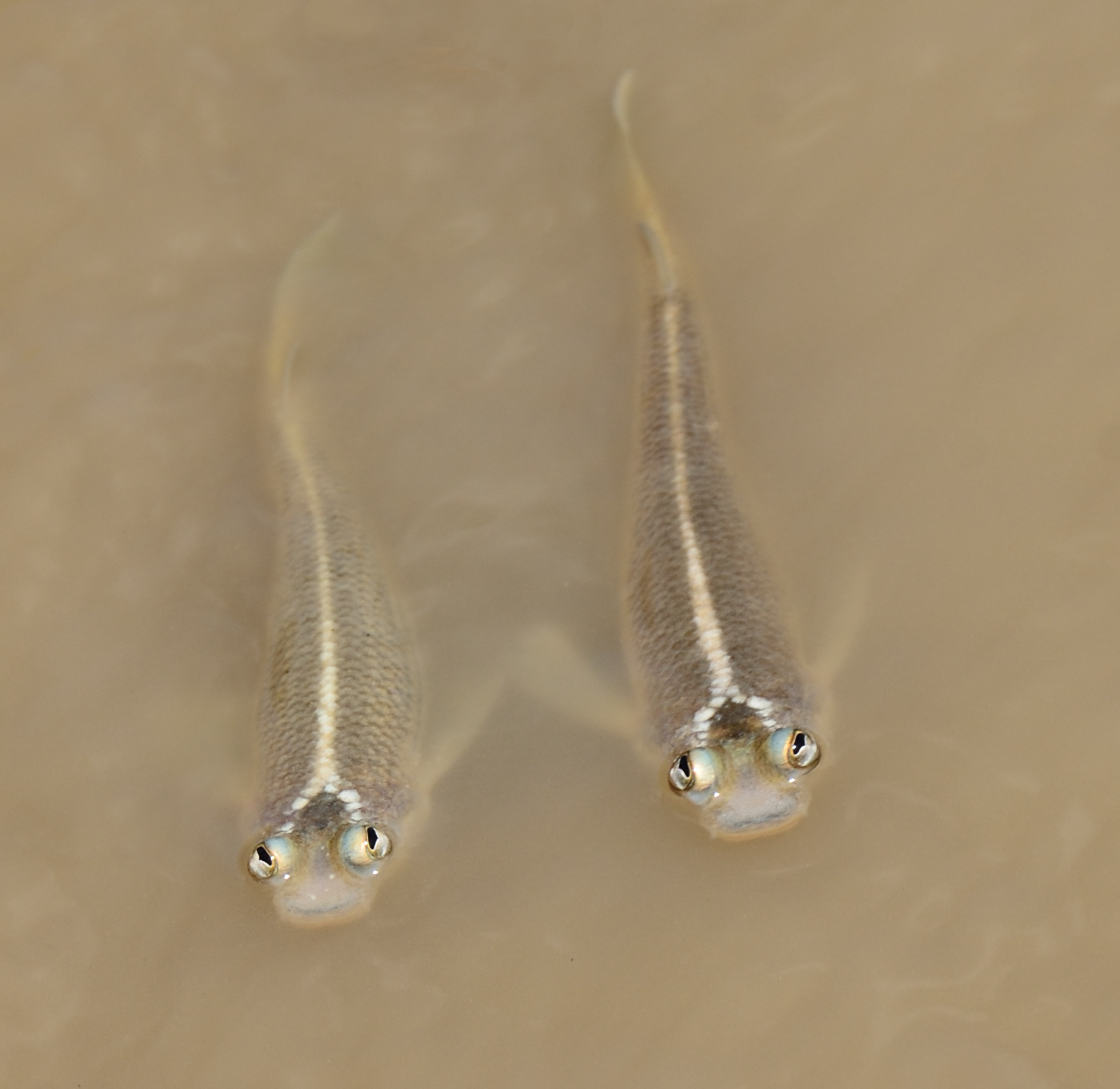
- A. anableps, Dégrad des Cannes, French Guiana

Scientific classification
- Kingdom: Animalia
- Phylum: Chordata
- Class: Actinopterygii
- Order: Cyprinodontiformes
- Family: Anablepidae
- Subfamily: Anablepinae
- Genus: Anableps; Scopoli, 1777

Type species
- Cobitis anableps Linnaeus, 1758

Species
- See text

= Four-eyed fish =

Genus of fishes

The four-eyed fishes are a genus, Anableps, of fishes in the family Anablepidae. Like other fishes, they have just two eyes, unusually raised above the top of the head. Each eye is divided into two different parts, so that they can see below and above the water surface at the same time.

The optomotor response or OMR has been used as a test to investigate potential differential visual processing in Anableps on normal versus 'blinded' fish (the eyes are actually covered—not physically blinded). It was found that the OMR does exist in Anableps and that the strength of this response is dependent on the visual field being tested—a stronger OMR was seen as a result of visual stimulation from the aerial environment.

Like their relatives, the onesided livebearers, four-eyed fishes mate only on one side, right-"handed" males with left-"handed" females and vice versa.

These fish inhabit fresh and brackish water and are only rarely coastal marine. They originate in lowlands in southern Mexico to Honduras and northern South America, but can also be found on the island of Trinidad located to the east of Venezuela.

== Species ==
There are currently three recognized species in this genus:

- Anableps anableps (Linnaeus, 1758) (Largescale foureyes)
- Anableps dowei T. N. Gill, 1861 (Pacific foureyed fish)
- Anableps microlepis J. P. Müller & Troschel, 1844 (Foureyes)

== Physical characteristics ==
The four-eyed fish eye: 1) Underwater retina. 2) Lens. 3) Air pupil. 4) Tissue band. 5) Iris. 6) Underwater pupil. 7) Air retina. 8) Optic nerve.

The maximum length of four-eyed fishes is up to 32 cm TL in A. microlepis, making this species the largest in the order Cyprinodontiformes.

Four-eyed fish have only two eyes, but the eyes are specially adapted for their surface-dwelling lifestyle. In early development, the four-eyed fish's frontal bone expands dorsally allowing the eyes to be positioned on top of their head and appear bulging. This allows the fish to simultaneously see above and below the water as it floats at the surface. The eyes are divided into dorsal and ventral halves, separated by a pigmented strip of tissue. Each eye has two pupils and two corneas filtering light onto one lens, refracting onto separate hemiretinas and processed through one optic disc. The upper (dorsal) half of the eye is adapted for vision in air, the lower (ventral) half for vision in water. The lens of the eye also changes in thickness top to bottom to compensate for the difference in the refractive indices of air versus water. The ventral hemiretina is characterized by thicker cell layers containing more sensory neurons and an increased visual acuity compared to the dorsal hemiretina.

Four-eyed fish are livebearers. Along with their sister genus Jenynsia they mate on one side only, right-"handed" males with left-"handed" females and vice versa. The male has specialized anal rays which are greatly elongated and fused into a tube called a gonopodium associated with the sperm duct which he uses as an intromittent organ to deliver sperm to the female.

== Behavior ==
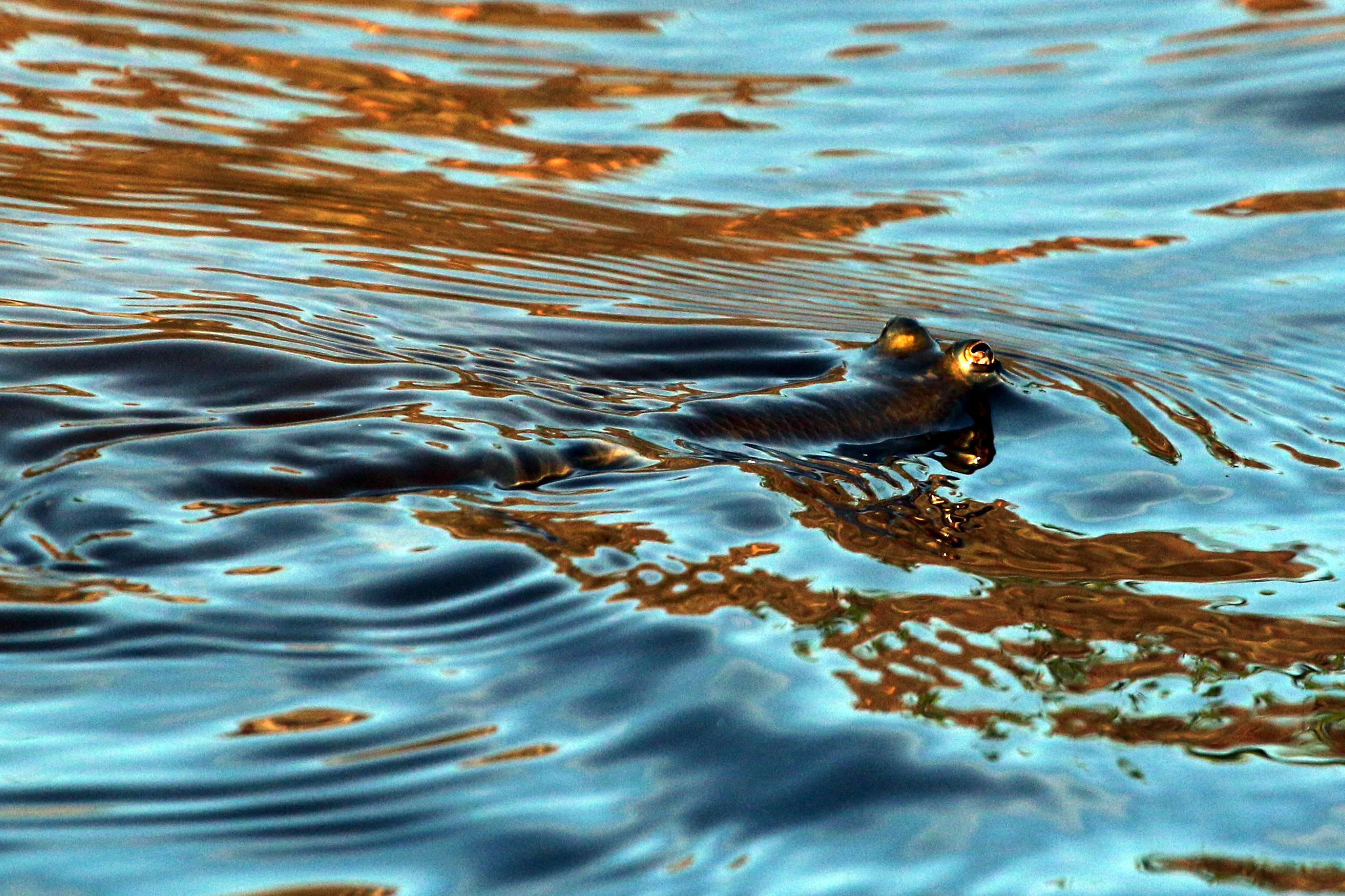
Four-eyed fish (Anableps anableps), Trinidad

Four-eyed fish spend most of their time at the surface of the water. Their diet mostly consists of terrestrial insects which are readily available at the surface, however they may consume other foods such as other invertebrates, diatoms, and small fishes.

The fish will group differently depending on the species. A. anableps commonly congregates in schools. A. microlepis also is gregarious, but restricts its schools to about a dozen individuals; it is also recorded to be found alone or as couples.

A. anableps is also known for the ability to survive out of water when exposed to air, especially during low tide.

== See also ==
- Rhinomugil, a genus of Asian and Australian mullets popularly known as false four-eyed fish
- Brownsnout spookfish, a fish with each eye divided into a part that works refractor and a part that works reflector
- Haikouichthys, an extinct genus of four-eyed craniate that lived 518 million years ago
