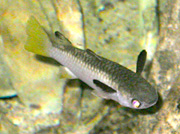
- Yellowtail mullet (S. cascasia)

Conservation status
- Least Concern (IUCN 3.1)

Scientific classification
- Kingdom: Animalia
- Phylum: Chordata
- Class: Actinopterygii
- Division: Teleostei
- Order: Mugiliformes
- Family: Mugilidae
- Genus: Sicamugil
- Species: S. cascasia

Binomial name
- Sicamugil cascasia (Hamilton, 1822)

Synonyms
- Mugil cascasia Hamilton, 1822; Liza cascasia (Hamilton, 1822); Minimugil cascasia (Hamilton, 1822)

= Yellowtail mullet =

Genus of ray-finned fishes

The yellowtail mullet (Sicamugil cascasia) is a species of potamodromous ray-finned fish, a mullet belonging to the family Mugilidae. It was the only species in the genus Minimugil proposed in 2012. It is found in Pakistan, India and Bangladesh.
