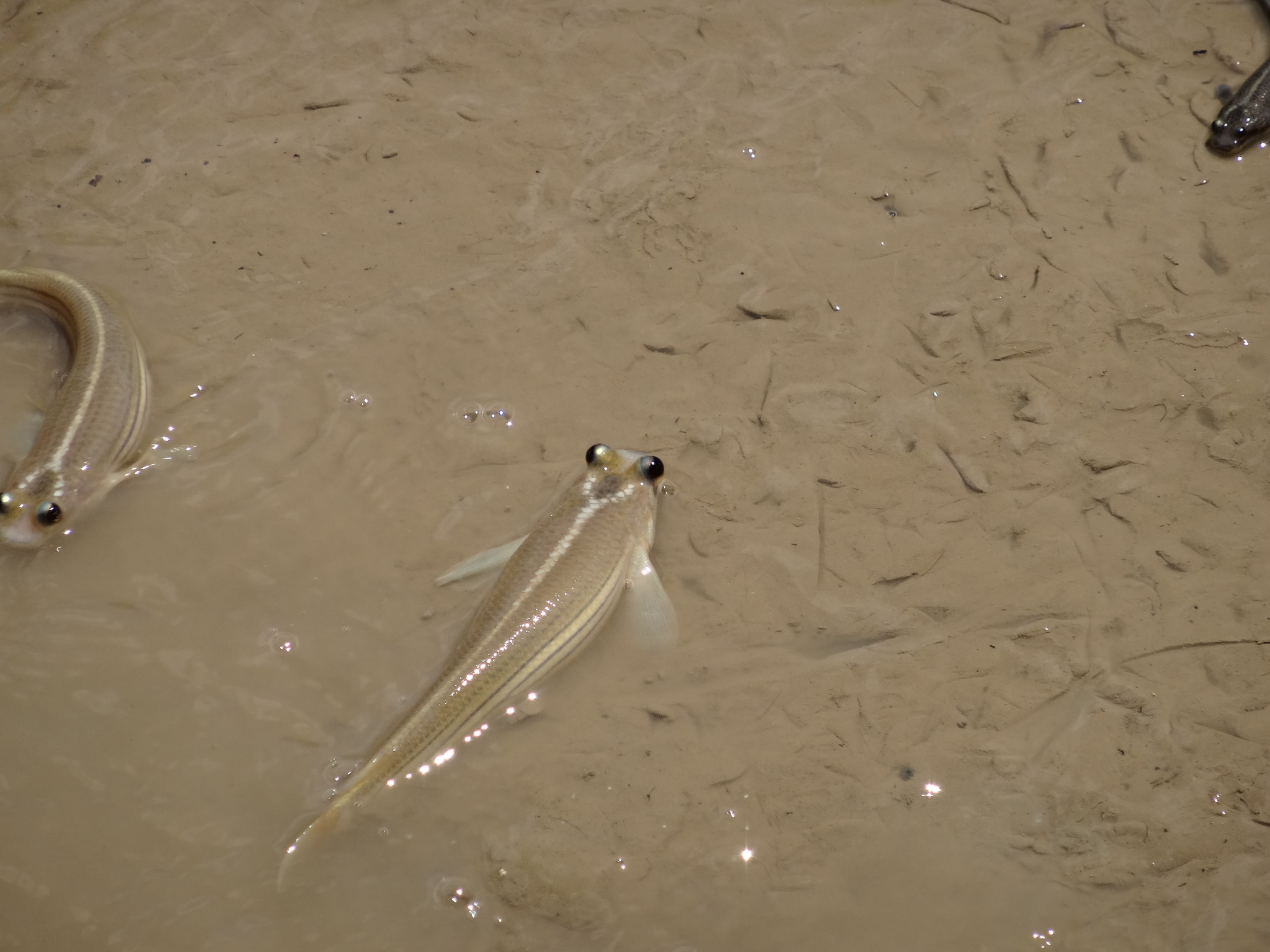
- Anableps microlepis from Meerzorg, Suriname

Conservation status
- Least Concern (IUCN 3.1)

Scientific classification
- Kingdom: Animalia
- Phylum: Chordata
- Class: Actinopterygii
- Order: Cyprinodontiformes
- Family: Anablepidae
- Genus: Anableps
- Species: A. microlepis

Binomial name
- Anableps microlepis Müller & Troschel, 1844

Synonyms
- Anableps coarctatus Valenciennes, 1846; Anableps elongatus Valenciennes, 1846

= Anableps microlepis =

Species of four-eyed fish

The finescaled four-eyed fish (Anableps microlepis) is a species of four-eyed fish found in coastal waters of the Atlantic Ocean from Trinidad and Tobago down to southeastern Brazil. They mostly inhabit brackish environments such as estuaries, mangrove swamps, and tidal mudflats. It grows to approximately 30 cm (12 in) in length.

This fish mostly feeds on organic matter and small invertebrates. In Manzanilla, this fish was found to feed on sand crabs (Emerita portoricensis) and small bivalves (Donax denticulatus). While looking for food, they travel up and down the coastline in large groups ranging from a dozen to more than a hundred fish.

Like other members of Anableps, this species has eyes that are split into two lobes, allowing it to see above and below water at the same time. They can be distinguished from the sympatric Anableps anableps by having smaller and more numerous scales (76-83 compared to the less than 64 of A. anableps). They also have a left or right-leaning gonopodium like other Anablepidae members and give live birth.
