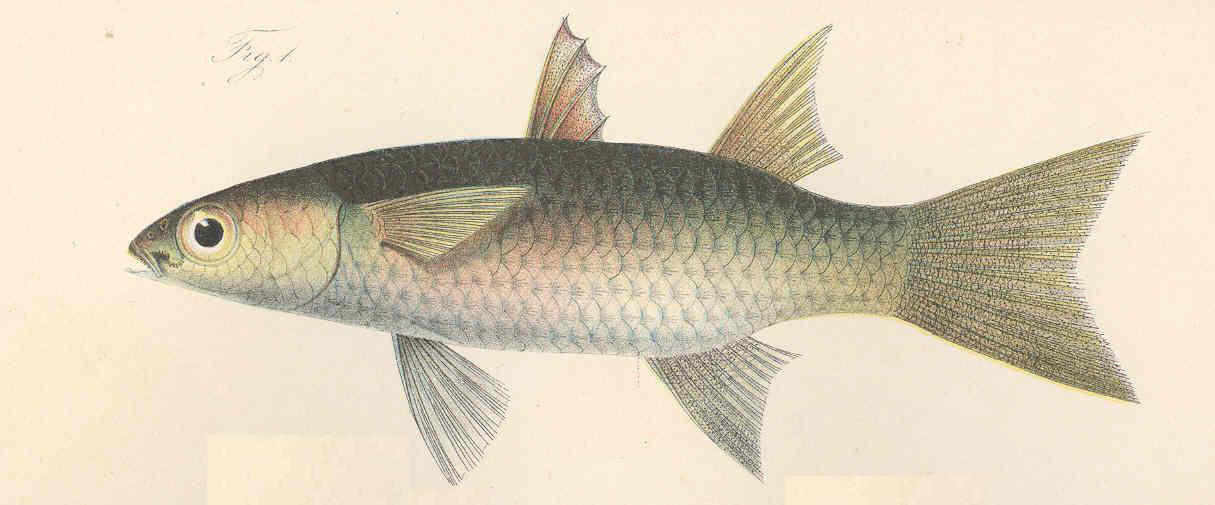

Conservation status
- Data Deficient (IUCN 3.1)

Scientific classification
- Kingdom: Animalia
- Phylum: Chordata
- Class: Actinopterygii
- Division: Teleostei
- Order: Mugiliformes
- Family: Mugilidae
- Genus: Parachelon; Durand, Chen, Shen, Fu & Borsa, 2012
- Species: P. grandisquamis

Binomial name
- Parachelon grandisquamis (Valenciennes, 1836)

Synonyms
- Mugil grandisquamis Valenciennes, 1836; Liza grandisquamis (Valenciennes, 1836); Mugil hypselopterus Günther, 1861; Mugil schlegeli Bleeker, 1863; Mugil productus Fischer, 1885

= Largescaled mullet =

Species of ray-finned fish

The largescaled mullet is a species of ray-finned fish from the family Mugilidae. It is found in the eastern Atlantic from Mauritania to the Gulf of Guinea. It is the only species in the monospecific genus Parachelon.
