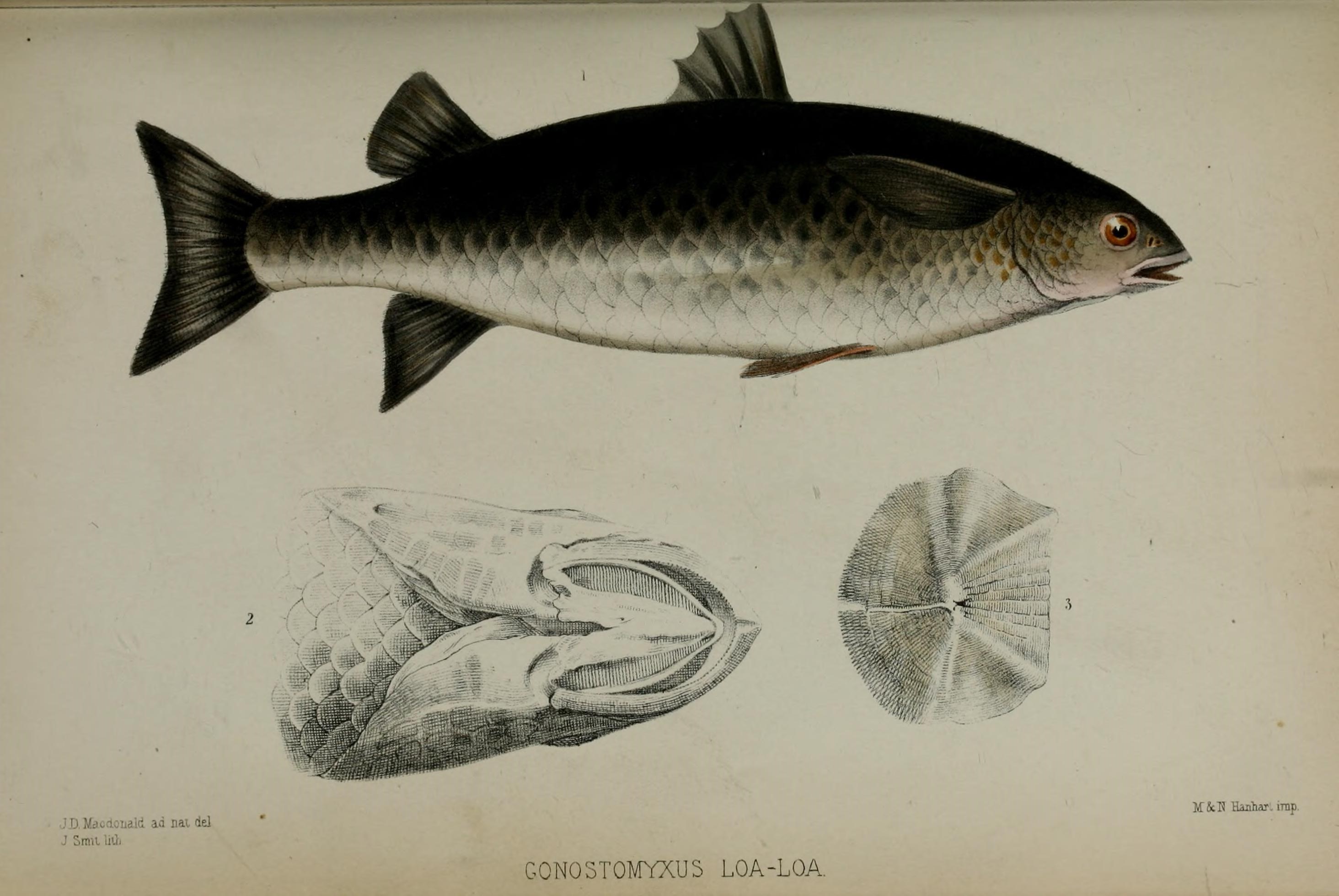
- Lobed river mullet (C. plicatilis)

Scientific classification
- Kingdom: Animalia
- Phylum: Chordata
- Class: Actinopterygii
- Order: Mugiliformes
- Family: Mugilidae
- Genus: Cestraeus; Valenciennes, 1836

Type species
- Cestraeus plicatilis Valenciennes, 1836

Species
- See text

= Cestraeus =

Genus of ray-finned fishes

Cestraeus is a genus of mullets found in rivers of Asia and Oceania.

== Species ==
There are currently three recognised species in this genus:

- Cestraeus goldiei (W. J. Macleay, 1883) – goldie river mullet
- Cestraeus oxyrhyncus Valenciennes, 1836 – sharp-nosed river mullet
- Cestraeus plicatilis Valenciennes, 1836 – lobed river mullet
