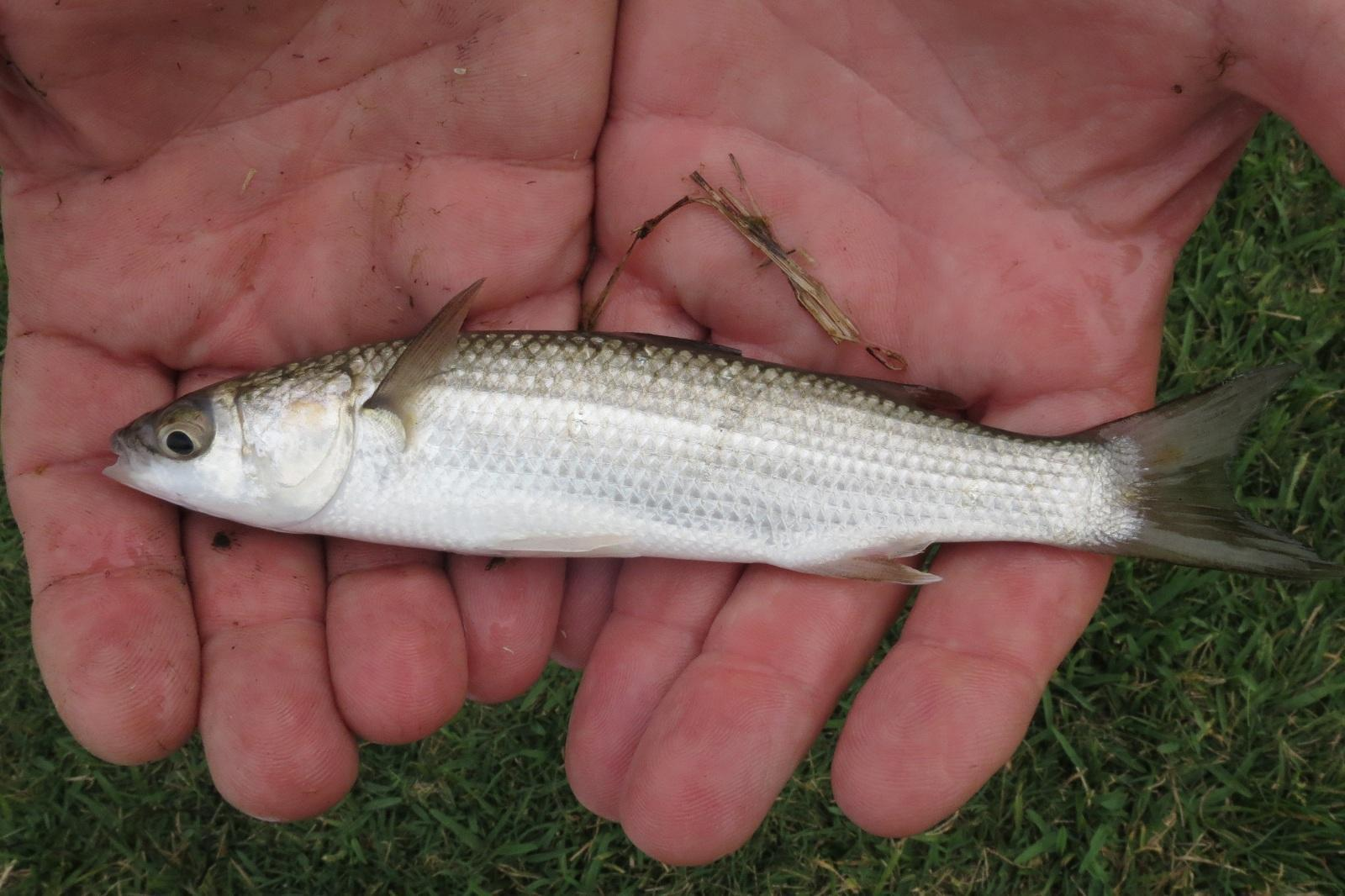

Conservation status
- Least Concern (IUCN 3.1)

Scientific classification
- Kingdom: Animalia
- Phylum: Chordata
- Class: Actinopterygii
- Order: Mugiliformes
- Family: Mugilidae
- Genus: Pseudomyxus; Durand, Chen, Shen, Fu & Borsa, 2012
- Species: P. capensis

Binomial name
- Pseudomyxus capensis (Valenciennes, 1836)

Synonyms
- Mugil capensis Valenciennes, 1836; Myxus capensis (Valenciennes, 1836); Mugil euronotus A. Smith, 1846; Trachystoma euronotus (A. Smith, 1846)

= Freshwater mullet =

Species of ray-finned fish

The freshwater mullet (Pseudomyxus capensis) is a species of ray-finned fish in the family Mugilidae. It is endemic to South Africa.

== Distribution ==
The freshwater mullet is endemic to South Africa where is distribution extends from Kwazulu-Natal, the Eastern Cape to the Western Cape, from Kosi Bay to the Breede River drainage.

== Habitat and biology ==
This species is found in estuaries and the juveniles need freshwater reaches for growth and safety. The adults spawn at sea, after reaching sexual maturity in estuaries. The juveniles move into the estuaries and up into rivers in the late southern winter or early spring and then stay there for seven years for females and four years for males. They feed on benthic algae and small invertebrates over muddy substrates.

== Conservation ==
The freshwater mullet's range and population have been impacted by the damming of streams and the introduction of alien fish.

== Taxonomy ==
The freshwater mullet was previously assigned to Myxus, but genetic studies in 2012 found it to be more closely related to the Fringelip mullet than to the Sand grey mullet, necessitating the erection of the monospecific genus Pseudomyxus for this species.
