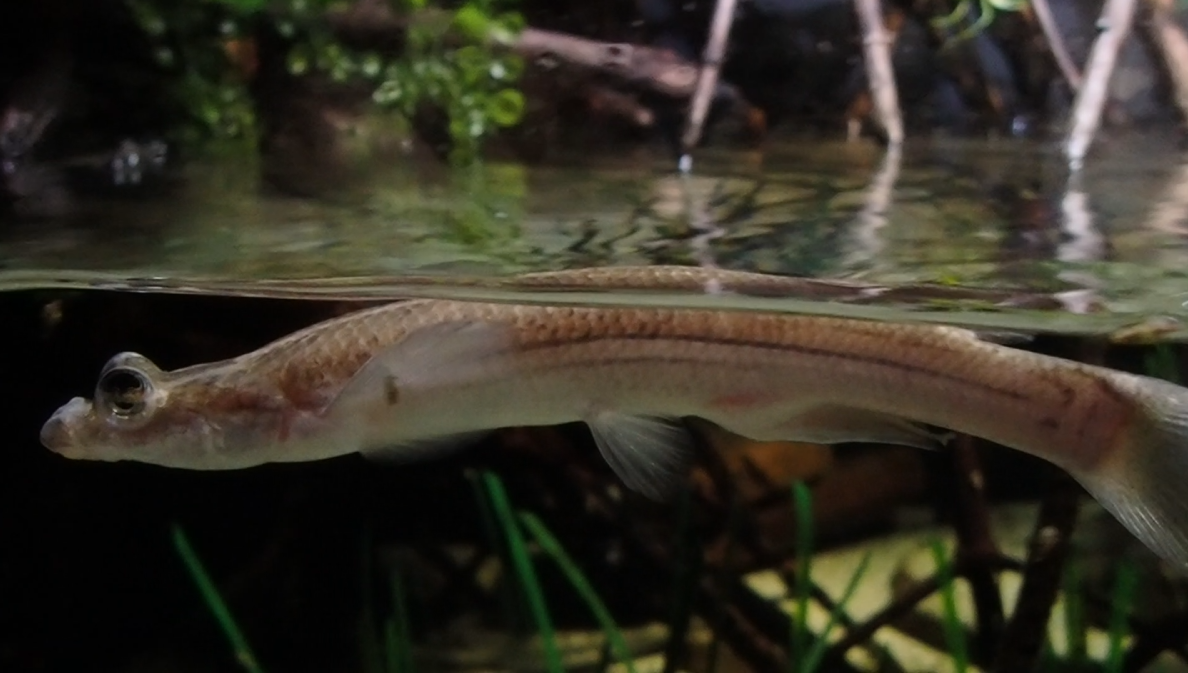
- at Steinhart Aquarium in California

Conservation status
- Least Concern (IUCN 3.1)

Scientific classification
- Kingdom: Animalia
- Phylum: Chordata
- Class: Actinopterygii
- Division: Teleostei
- Order: Cyprinodontiformes
- Family: Anablepidae
- Genus: Anableps
- Species: A. anableps

Binomial name
- Anableps anableps (Linnaeus, 1758)

Synonyms
- Cobitis anableps Linnaeus, 1758; Anableps anableps Meuschen, 1778; Anableps tetrophthalmus Bloch, 1794; Anableps surinamensis Lacépède, 1803; Anableps gronovii Valenciennes, 1846; Anableps lineatus Gronow, 1854

= Anableps anableps =

Species of fish

Anableps anableps, the largescale four-eyes, is a species of four-eyed fish found in fresh and brackish waters of northern South America and Trinidad. This species grows to a length of 24.5 centimetres (9.6 in) standard length (SL). This fish can occasionally be found in the aquarium trade. The fish does not actually have four eyes. Instead, each eye is split into two lobes by a horizontal band of tissue, each lobe with its own pupil and separate vision. This allows the fish to see above and below the surface of the water at the same time. This species has been documented to occasionally feed on land. Both sexes exhibit asymmetrical genitalia.

== Taxonomy ==
The name "Anableps" comes from the Greek "ana", meaning "up", and "blepo", meaning "sight" or "glance".

This fish was first described in 1758 by the Swedish naturalist Carl Linnaeus in the tenth edition of his Systema Naturae. Linnaeus originally placed the fish in the genus Cobitis, the spiny loaches. A review of fish species from 1892 seemed to recognize this error, and though it still refers to the species as "Cobitis anableps", it grouped this species with others in the genus Anableps. The earliest known mention of this species as "A. anableps" comes from a paper from 1895.

== Description ==
Anableps anableps is a slender elongate fish with very distinct eyes that project prominently from the head. Each eye is divided lengthwise and thus has two pupils; the fish positions itself in such a way that the dividing line between the two parts of the eye lies on the surface of the water, so that one pupil has an aerial view while the other is submerged. It is brown in color with some countershading.

This fish also exhibits some sexual dimorphism. Females are larger and much heavier than males, reaching an average of 18.5 cm (7.3 in) standard length (SL) and 80 g (2.8 oz) in weight, while males reach an average of 14.5 cm (5.7 in) SL and 31 g (1.1 oz) in weight. At maximum, females may reach up to 24.5 cm (9.6 in) SL and 200 g (7.1 oz), while the largest males reach 18.5 cm (7.3 in) SL and 70 g (2.5 oz). Other differences between the sexes include the presence of a gonopodium. Juveniles and adult females possess an anal fin, while male fish have the anal fin modified into an intromittent organ with the tip angled to one side. This structure, called the gonopodium, is used in reproduction. Adult females have 11 anal fin rays, where rays 1–3 and 11 are unbranched. Female fish also have a modified scale called a foriculum covering either the left or right genital opening.

A. anableps can be distinguished from other species in the genus by the small number and large size of its scales. Another distinguishing characteristic of this species is the number and color of its lateral stripes. The stripes are blue or purple in color, and extend between the pectoral and pelvic fins. Typically, there are 3 prominent stripes but up to 5 may be present. Females of this species are the only ones in the genus to possess a foriculum.

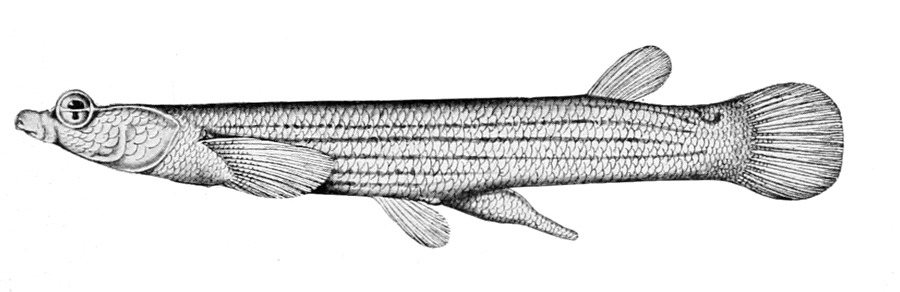
Side view showing typical morphology

== Distribution and habitat ==
Anableps anableps is found in the tropical western Atlantic Ocean and the southern Caribbean Sea. Its range extends from Trinidad and Venezuela to the delta of the Amazon River in Brazil. However, some sources report occurrences as far south as the Bay of All Saints in Brazil, and some occurrences very far inland. It mostly occurs in estuaries and on coastal mudflats, where it shares its habitat with A. microlepis. Unlike A. microlepis, however, A. anableps can survive in freshwater environments for extended periods.

== Ecology ==
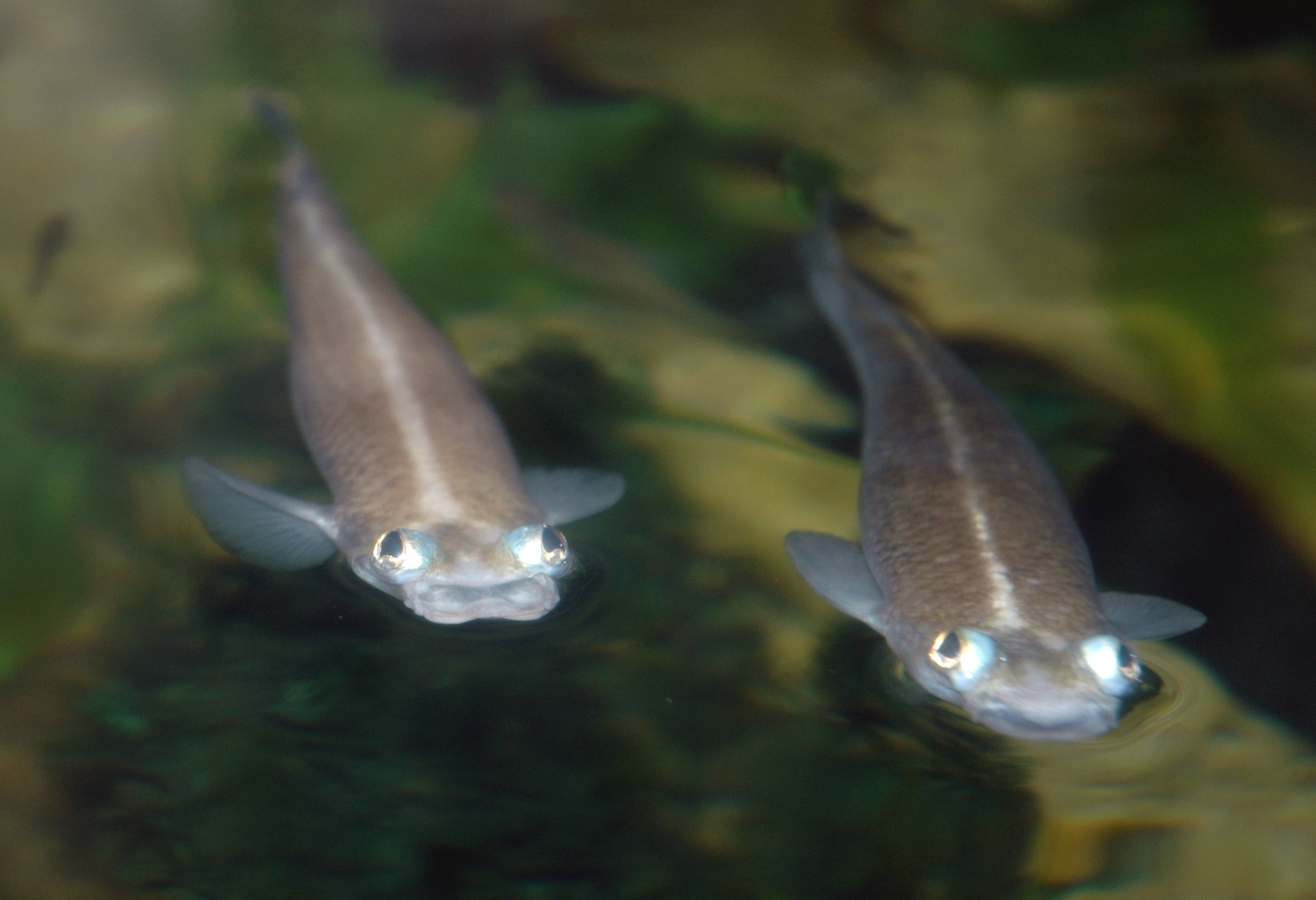
A pair of A. anableps schooling near the surface at Newport Aquarium

Anableps anableps typically stays close to the surface of the water, utilizing its unique eyes to see above and below the surface of the water at the same time. It rarely ever dives below the surface, though it must periodically submerge its eyes to prevent desiccation. This species forms schools of 10 to 50 individuals.

A. anableps has a generalist diet, feeding on insects and other small invertebrates (such as small crabs), small fish, and on algae. A large part of its diet consists of detritus, but the highest diversity of prey items comes from insects. It has occasionally been observed catching insects by jumping in the air, but otherwise, it ingests prey on or near the surface. It also ingests silt, consuming diatoms, mussels, and isopods among the grains. Sometimes it emerges from the water and feeds on mudbanks.

In the water, the fish uses a combination of biting and suction to capture its prey. It feeds by depressing the lower jaw and protruding the upper jaw, and ingesting the prey by suction. If the prey is too large to swallow, it is gripped by the teeth, the upper jaw is retracted, and the fish bites the prey. This cycle of protrusion and biting can be repeated until the prey is able to be swallowed. There is also evidence that this fish uses some degree of ram feeding for small prey items.

When the fish beaches itself to feed on land, it uses a different feeding mechanism. It positions its head above the prey, rotating its lower jaw over 180 degrees. It then protrudes its upper jaw downwards to bite down on the prey. This mechanism is similar to the picking behavior observed in other Cyprinodontiforms.

In mangrove areas of Brazil, it has a daily migration pattern synchronized with the tides; as the tide rises it enters the intertidal channels, feeding in the inundated mangroves at high water, and retreating to the main channels as the tide ebbs. Feed consumption was at its greatest around high water during daylight spring tides and was at its minimum at night-time neap tides, perhaps demonstrating the importance of its vision in feeding. Red intertidal algae (Catenella sp.) was the main food item, supplemented by insects and shore crabs (family Grapsidae).

A. anableps is affected by the parasitic praniza larvae of isopods in the family Gnathiidae, which feed on its blood by attaching to the gills and skin. Prevalence may vary between populations, though one study reported that 42.3% of individuals in an area were infected. This species is also affected by a species of parasitic copepod, Acusicola rochai, in the family Ergasilidae, with as many as 66% of individuals reported to be infected.

== Eyes ==
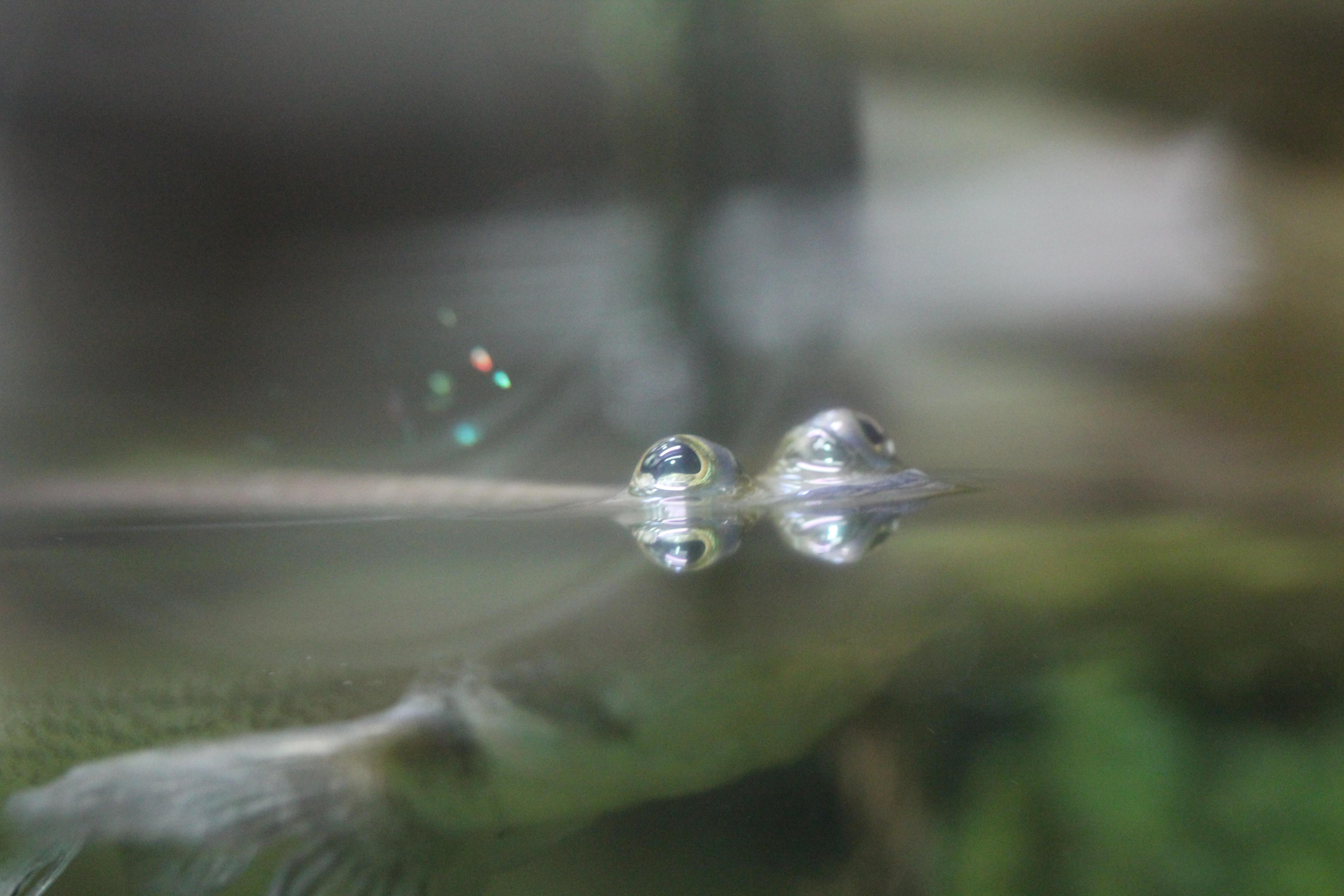
A. anableps positions its eyes level with the waterline

Anableps anableps positions itself in the water column so that half of each eye is above water and half is below. It is able to detect tiny Drosophila species floating on the water, and can detect even slight movements above the waterline, making them difficult to catch.

The eyes of A. anableps are similar to other species in the genus, with each spherical eye possessing double the amount of several structures, including two pupils, two corneas, and two retinas. The eyes of this fish still retain a single lens and optic nerve, however. The eyes are divided in half laterally by a band of tissue, which is kept at the water level. The iris and tissue band divide the vision by forming an aperture. This prevents two images from being formed due to refraction on the water-air boundary.

In addition to the duplication of many structures, many are also modified. The upper pupil is larger than the lower pupil. The upper cornea is slightly more curved than the lower. The lower side of the retina is thicker and has different cell densities. The lower retina receives light signals from the air, while the upper retina receives signals from the water. Though there is only one lens present, it is asymmetrical, with the lower portion being more rounded.

The bifocal eye of Anableps can focus both above and below the waterline at the same time.

As embryos, the eyes of Anableps anableps are typical of other fish species, with a single pupil. As the fish develops, the middle of the pupil constricts laterally, dividing it in half. The eyes increase in size, and the surrounding bones expand upwards, resulting in the eyes protruding above the skull. Cartilage fills in empty space in the top of the skull between the eyes, which later hardens into bone. The two halves of the retina show differences in protein expression during development in the absence of light, suggesting the two halves are genetically independent.

== Reproduction ==
Like other members of its family, Anableps anableps is viviparous, meaning it has internal fertilization and gives live birth (as opposed to laying eggs). Members of this species can reproduce multiple times throughout the year, though some evidence suggests the later months of the year are preferred.

Females may carry between 1–37 eggs, which stay and develop as embryos in the ovarian follicles until the yolk sac is absorbed and the fish are born. The ovaries and follicles change dramatically in both size and structure to accommodate the embryos as they grow, but return to normal after birth. All embryos are fertilized and develop at the same time, and fertilization of new eggs cannot occur until the current brood is born, unlike in A. microlepis.

In males, the rays of the anal fin develop into a long bony structure called a gonopodium, which is used to deposit sperm. The rays of the anal fin curve to form an asymmetrical cylindrical structure that almost fully encloses a sperm duct (distinguishing it from the gonopodia in families Goodeidae and Poeciliidae). The tip of the gonopodium bends to either the left or right side of the fish. During the development of the gonopodium, an additional anteriormost anal fin ray forms that is not present in females or juveniles.

Females of this species usually have asymmetrical genitalia. The asymmetry in females comes from the foriculum, which is a modified scale that covers the oviduct, located behind the vent. The foriculum only opens to one side, meaning that right-handed males can only mate with left-handed females, and vice versa.

Right and left-handed fish of both sexes are found in roughly equal proportions in the wild. Breeding experiments with this species may suggest that the handedness of the gonopodium is determined randomly, and is not heritable or dependent on environmental conditions.

== Human uses and impacts ==
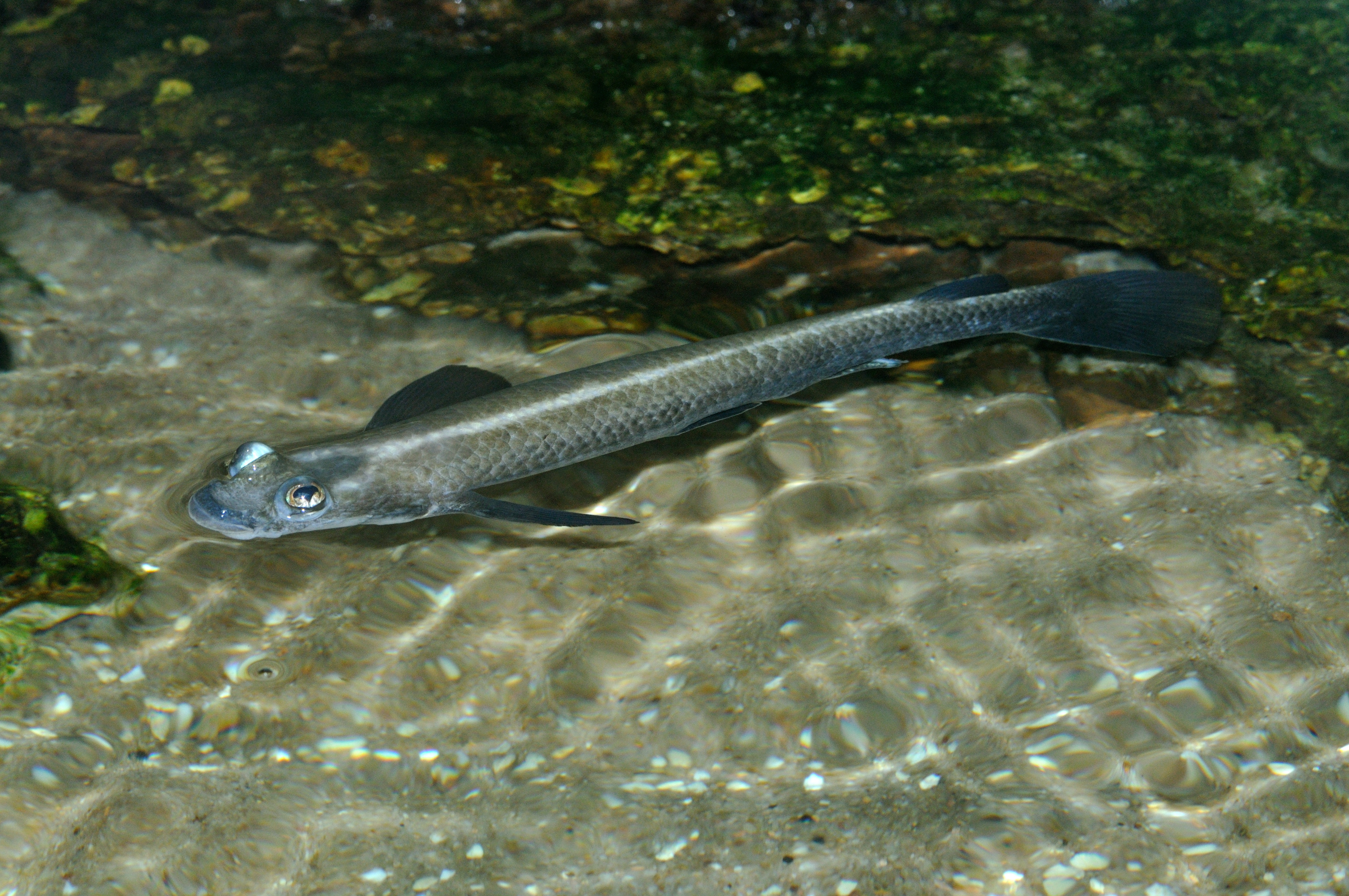
A captive specimen at Hellabrunn Zoo

Researchers favor this species for its unique eye morphology. The unique appearance of this species has attracted the attention of the public, as this species can be found in many films, lectures, and in both public and home aquariums.

Despite its use in the aquarium trade, Anableps anableps was classified as Least Concern by the IUCN in 2020. No specific population trends are known, however.
