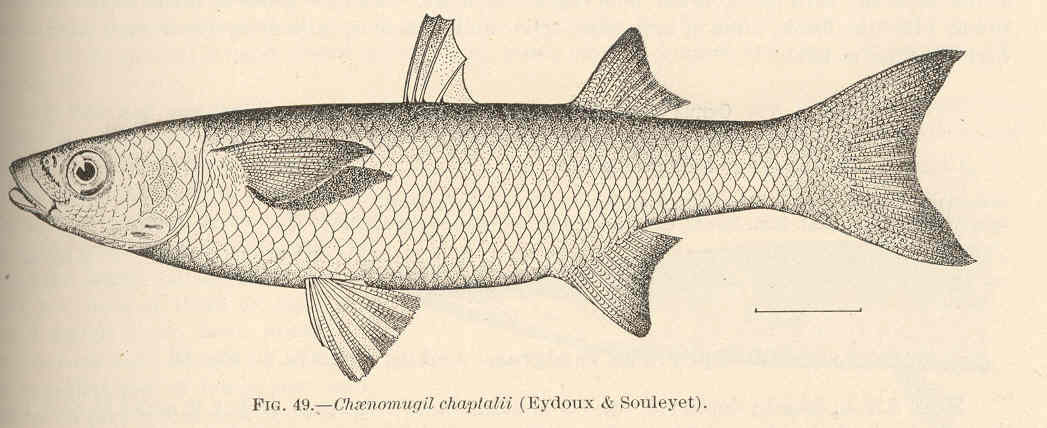
- Chaenomugil chaptalii

Conservation status
- Least Concern (IUCN 3.1)

Scientific classification
- Kingdom: Animalia
- Phylum: Chordata
- Class: Actinopterygii
- Division: Teleostei
- Order: Mugiliformes
- Family: Mugilidae
- Genus: Chaenomugil; T. N. Gill, 1863
- Species: C. proboscideus

Binomial name
- Chaenomugil proboscideus (Günther, 1861)

Synonyms
- Mugil proboscideus Günther, 1861

= Chaenomugil =

Species of ray-finned fish

Chaenomugil proboscideus, the snouted mullet, is a species mullet found along the western coast of North America from Mexico to Panama. It is the only species in the genus Chaenomugil. It is found in rocky, areas near the coast where it feeds on algae growing on rocks which it scrapes off using its specialized teeth. This species grows to a length of 22 centimetres (8.7 in) TL. This fish is of minor importance in local commercial fisheries, mostly in Panama. This is the only known species in its genus.
