= Sicamugil =

Scientific classification
- Kingdom: Animalia
- Phylum: Chordata
- Class: Actinopterygii
- Division: Teleostei
- Order: Mugiliformes
- Family: Mugilidae
- Genus: Sicamugil; Fowler, 1939

Type species
- Mugil hamiltonii F. Day, 1870

Genus of fishes

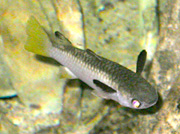
Sicamugil cascasia, or the Yellowtail Mullet.

Sicamugil is a genus of mugilid mullets found in rivers of South Asia and Burma.

== Species ==
There are currently two recognized species in this genus:

- Sicamugil cascasia (F. Hamilton, 1822) (Yellowtail mullet)
- Sicamugil hamiltonii (F. Day, 1870) (Burmese mullet)
