= Sicklefin mullet =

Conservation status
- Data Deficient (IUCN 3.1)

Scientific classification
- Kingdom: Animalia
- Phylum: Chordata
- Class: Actinopterygii
- Order: Mugiliformes
- Family: Mugilidae
- Genus: Neochelon; Durand, Chen, Shen, Fu & Borsa, 2012
- Species: N. falcipinnis

Binomial name
- Neochelon falcipinnis (Valenciennes, 1836)

Synonyms
- Mugil falcipinnis Valenciennes, 1836; Chelon falcipinnis (Valenciennes, 1836); Liza falcipinnis (Valenciennes, 1836)

Species of ray-finned fish

The sicklefin mullet (Neochelon falcipinnis) is a species of ray-finned fish, a grey mullet from the family Mugilidae which is found in the eastern Atlantic Ocean of the coasts of western Africa. It is the only species in the monospecific genus Neochelon.
