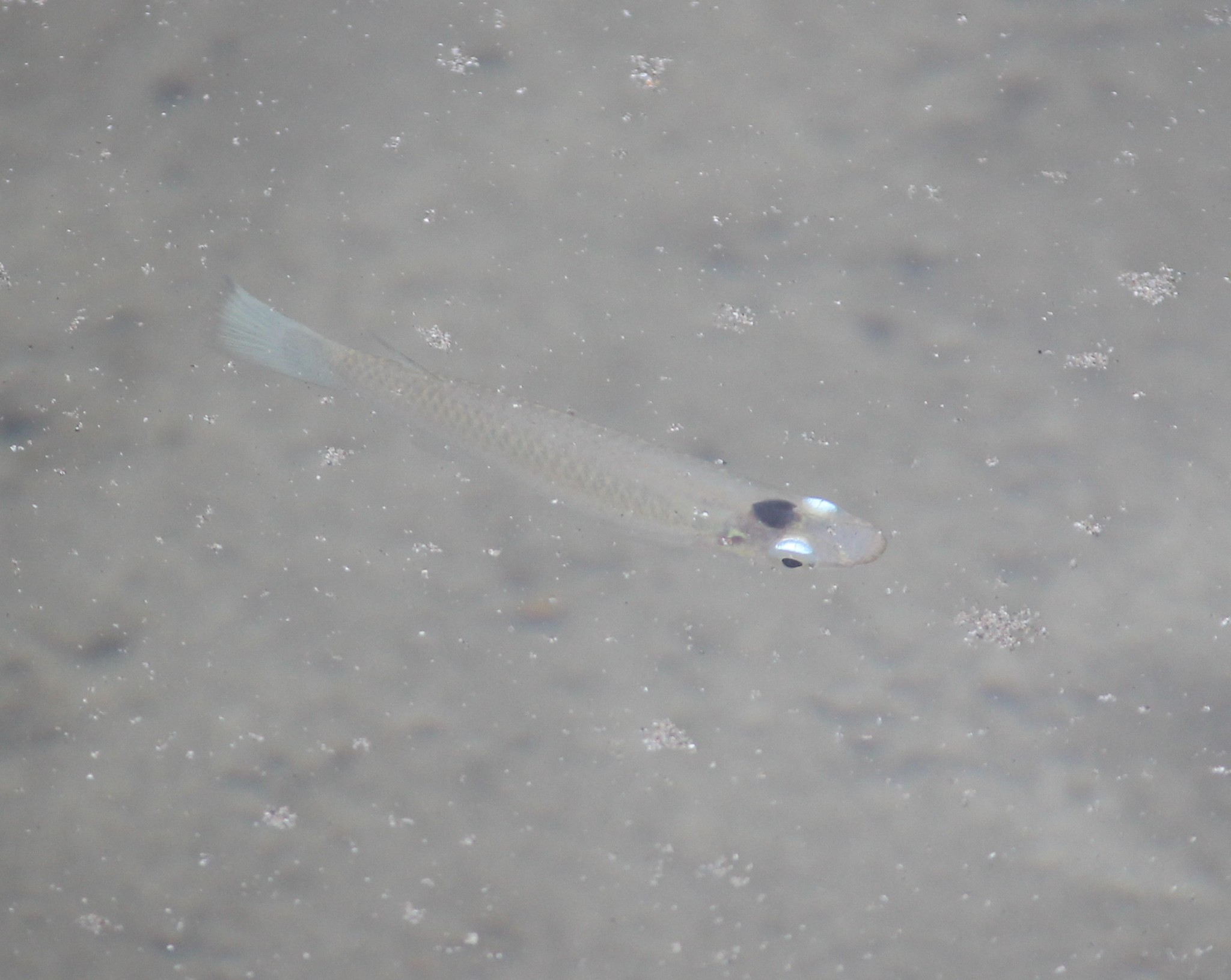
- In Costa Rica

Conservation status
- Least Concern (IUCN 3.1)

Scientific classification
- Kingdom: Animalia
- Phylum: Chordata
- Class: Actinopterygii
- Order: Cyprinodontiformes
- Family: Anablepidae
- Subfamily: Oxyzygonectinae; Parenti, 1981
- Genus: Oxyzygonectes; Fowler, 1916
- Species: O. dovii

Binomial name
- Oxyzygonectes dovii (Günther, 1866)

Synonyms
- Haplochilus dovii Günther, 1866

= White-eye (fish) =

Species of fish

The white-eye (Oxyzygonectes dovii) is a species of killifish of the family Anablepidae. This species is the only member of its genus, Oxyzygonectes, and the subfamily Oxyzygonectinae.

This fish species is found in Pacific drainages in Nicaragua, Costa Rica, and Panama.

O. dovii has no gonopodium like the other members of its family. The dorsal and anal fins are posteriorly placed just before the caudal peduncle and well behind the midbody. The reach a maximum length of about 15 centimetres (6 in) TL.

Many of these fish inhabit brackish waters. They are found in rivers of low elevation, up to 15 metres (50 ft) above sea level. These fish feed on detritus, algae, and sometimes on terrestrial insects.

Though it occurs in estuaries, it breeds in freshwater. This species is not a seasonal killifish. O. dovii has been bred in captivity.

== Etymology ==
The fish is named in honor of John Melmoth Dow (1827–1892), of the Panama Railroad Company, who in addition to being a ship captain, he was an amateur naturalist who presented the type specimen to the British Museum. The "w" is Latinized as a "v".
