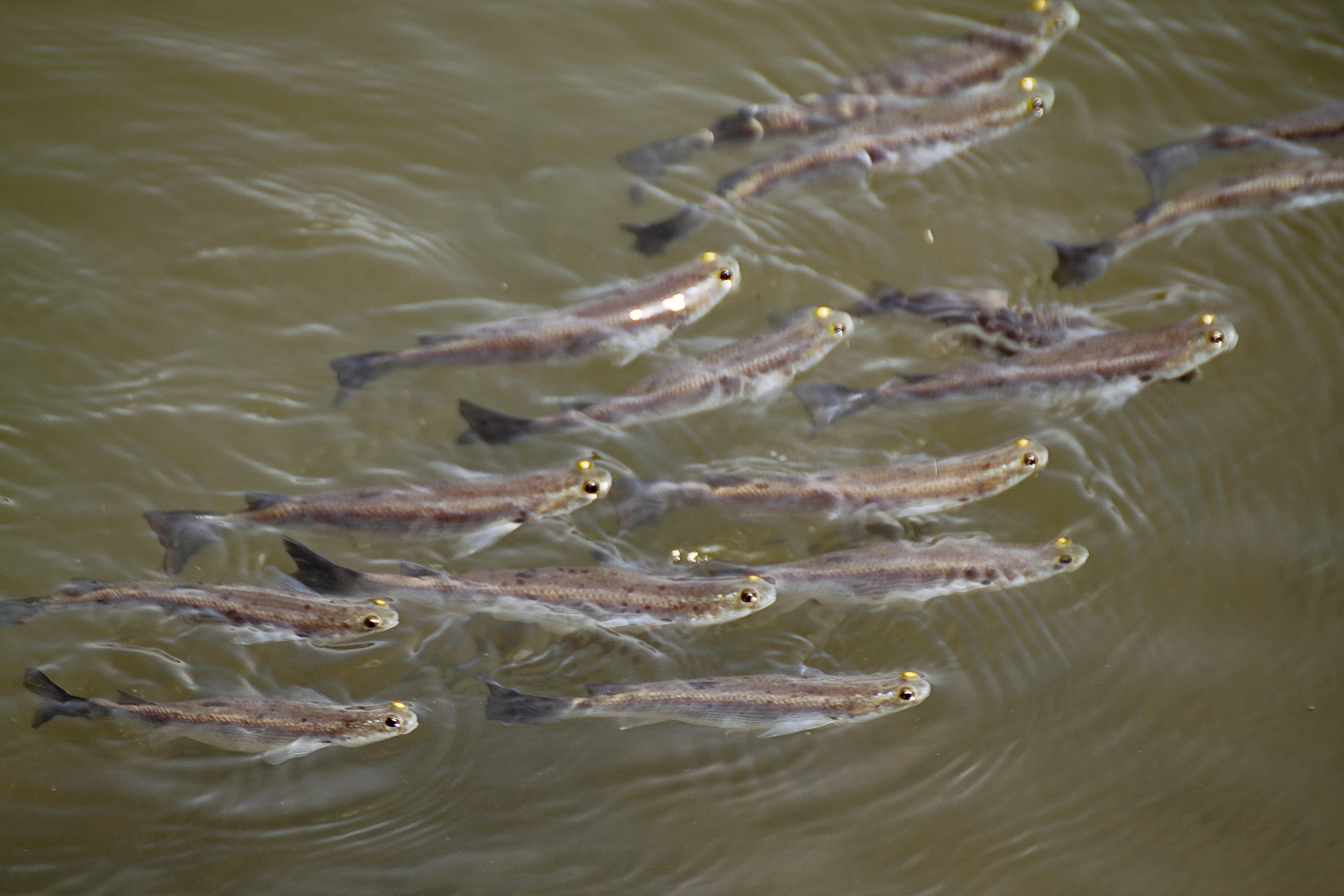

Conservation status
- Least Concern (IUCN 3.1)

Scientific classification
- Kingdom: Animalia
- Phylum: Chordata
- Class: Actinopterygii
- Order: Mugiliformes
- Family: Mugilidae
- Genus: Rhinomugil; T. N. Gill, 1863
- Species: R. corsula

Binomial name
- Rhinomugil corsula (Hamilton, 1822)

Synonyms
- Mugil corsula Hamilton, 1822; Liza corsula (Hamilton, 1822)

= Corsula (fish) =

Species of ray-finned fish

The corsula (Rhinomugil corsula) is a species of ray-finned fish from the mullet family Mugilidae. It is found in the rivers and estuaries of southern Asia, in India, Bangladesh, Nepal and Myanmar. It is presently regarded as the only species in the monospecific genus Rhinomugil.

It is known in the aquarium trade as the Indian or false four-eyed fish, as the eyes are parted horizontally to enable the fish to see above and below the water surface at the same time, as with the South American four-eyed fish of the genus Anableps.

== See also ==
Squalomugil; similar monotypic genus from Australasia, former congener.
