= Pinkeye mullet =

Conservation status
- Least Concern (IUCN 3.1)

Scientific classification
- Kingdom: Animalia
- Phylum: Chordata
- Class: Actinopterygii
- Order: Mugiliformes
- Family: Mugilidae
- Genus: Trachystoma; Ogilby, 1888
- Species: T. petardi

Binomial name
- Trachystoma petardi (Castelnau, 1875)

Synonyms
- Mugil petardi Castelnau, 1875; Myxus petardi (Castelnau, 1875); Mugil breviceps Steindachner, 1866; Trachystoma multidens Ogilby, 1888; Myxus multidens (Ogilby, 1888); Mugil parviceps Waite, 1904

Species of ray-finned fish

The pinkeye mullet (Trachystoma petardi), also known simply as pinkeye, or freshwater mullet, Richmond mullet, or river mullet, is a species of ray-finned fish from the grey mullet family Mugilidae and the only species in the genus Trachystoma. It is endemic to northeastern Australia where it occurs from the Burnett River in Queensland to the Clyde River in New South Wales. It is a subtropical species which is found in deep, slow flowing sections of rivers as well as in estuaries although it moves into coastal seas to spawn. It feeds mainly on algae and plant material, as well as detritus and benthic invertebrates.

The pinkeye mullet was originally described by Francis de Laporte de Castelnau in 1875 as Mugil petardi. The specific name honours a Mr Petard who sent Castelnau specimens of fishes he collected in the Richmond River in New South Wales; these included the type of this species.

It is a dark greenish-brown mullet with a silvery belly and pale yellowish fins. It has a body which is deep and robust with a small mouth and small eyes. It grows to up to 80 centimetres (31 in) in standard length, although 40 centimetres (16 in) is more usual.
