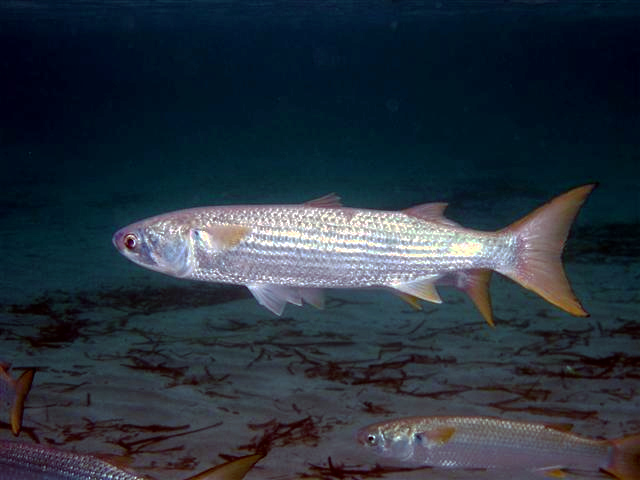
- Mugil cephalus

Scientific classification
- Kingdom: Animalia
- Phylum: Chordata
- Class: Actinopterygii
- Division: Teleostei
- Order: Mugiliformes
- Family: Mugilidae; Jarocki, 1822

Type species
- Mugil cephalus Linnaeus, 1758

Genera
- See text.

= Mullet (fish) =

Mullet Temporal range: Late Oligocene to present

Family (Mugilidae) of ray-finned fish

The mullets or grey mullets are a family (Mugilidae) of ray-finned fish found worldwide in coastal temperate and tropical waters, and some species in fresh water. Mullets have served as an important source of food in Mediterranean Europe since Roman times. In ancient Egypt, people ate pickled and dried mullet called fesikh. The family includes about 78 species in 26 genera.

Mullets are distinguished by the presence of two separate dorsal fins, small, triangular mouths, and the absence of a lateral line organ. They feed on detritus, and most species have unusually muscular stomachs and a complex pharynx to help in digestion.

== Classification and naming ==
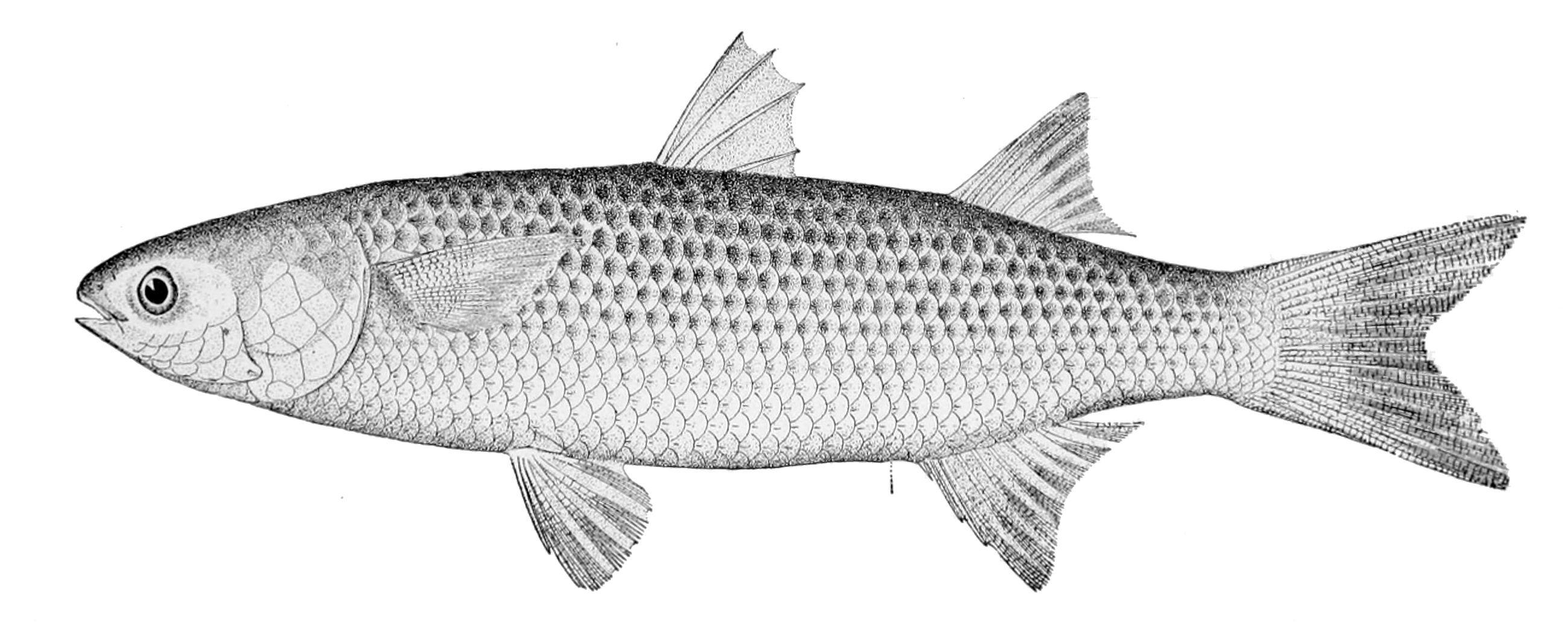
Mugil cephalus

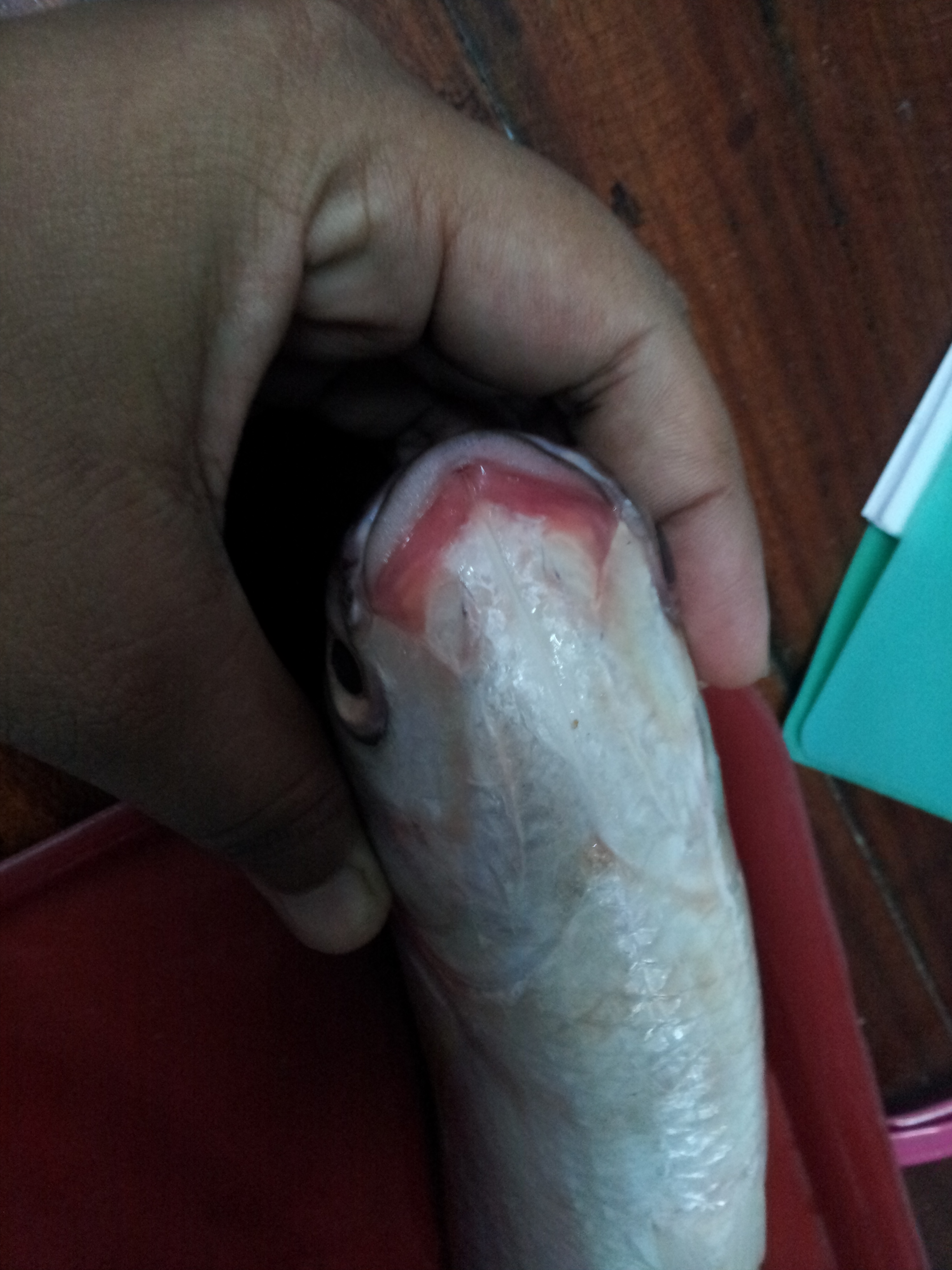
Thick lips of a mullet

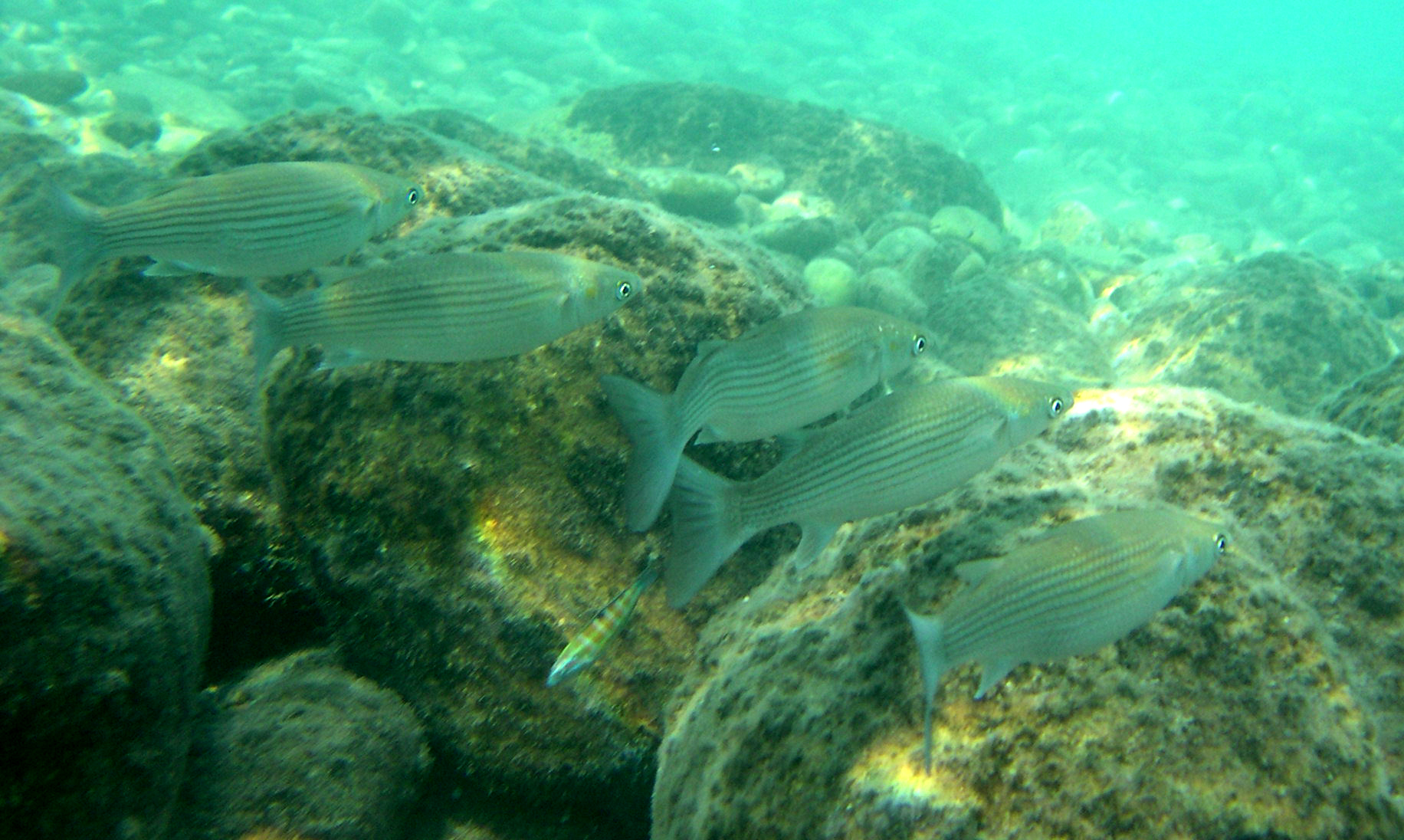
Mullets in the Mediterranean Sea

Taxonomically, the family is placed in the order Mugiliformes, which is named after it. Until recently, it was considered the only member of Mugiliformes, but more recent taxonomic treatments suggest that they are closely related to the Asiatic glassfishes (Ambassidae), which are now also placed in the group. The presence of fin spines clearly indicates membership in the superorder Acanthopterygii, and in the 1960s, they were classed as primitive perciforms, while others have grouped them in Atheriniformes.

In North America, "mullet" by itself usually refers to the Mugilidae. In Europe, the word "mullet" is usually qualified, the "grey mullets" being Mugilidae and the "red mullets" or "surmullets" being Mullidae, notably members of the genus Mullus. Outside Europe, the Mullidae are often called "goatfish". Fish with common names including the word "mullet" may be a member of one family or the other, or even unrelated, such as the freshwater Catostomus commersonii.

However, recent taxonomic work has reorganised the family and the following genera make up the Mugilidae:

- Agonostomus Bennett, 1832
- Aldrichetta Whitley, 1945
- Cestraeus Valenciennes, 1836
- Chaenomugil Gill, 1863
- Chelon Artedi, 1763
- Dajaus Valenciennes, 1836
- Ellochelon Whitley, 1930
- Gracilimugil Whitley, 1941
- Joturus Poey, 1860
- Minimugil Durand, Chen, Shen, Fu & Borsa, 2012
- Moolgarda Whitley, 1945
- Mugil Linnaeus, 1758
- Myxus Günther, 1861
- Neomyxus Steindachner, 1878
- Neochelon Durand, Chen, Shen, Fu & Borsa 2012
- Oedalechilus Fowler 1903
- Osteomugil G. Luther, 1982
- Parachelon Durand, Chen, Shen, Fu & Borsa 2012
- Paramugil Ghasemzadeh, Ivantsoff & Aarn 2004
- Planiliza Whitley, 1945
- Plicomugil Schultz, 1953
- Pseudomyxus Durand, Chen, Shen, Fu & Borsa 2012
- Rhinomugil Gill, 1863
- Sicamugil Fowler, 1939
- Squalomugil Ogilby, 1908
- Trachystoma Ogilby, 1888

The oldest known fossil mullet is †Mugil princeps from the latest Oligocene-aged Aix-en-Provence Formation of France.

== Behaviour ==
A common noticeable behaviour in mullet is the tendency to leap out of the water. Two types of leaps are distinguishable - a straight, clean slice out of the water to escape predators and a slower, lower jump while turning to its side that results in a larger, more distinguishable splash. The reasons for this lower jump are disputed, but are thought to be to gain oxygen-rich air for gas exchange in a small organ above the pharynx.

== Development ==
The ontogeny of mugilid larvae has been well studied, with the larval development of Mugil cephalus in particular being studied intensively due to its wide range of distribution and interest to aquaculture. The previously understudied osteological development of M. cephalus was investigated in a 2021 study, with four embryonic and six larval developmental steps being described in aquaculture-reared and wild-caught specimens. These descriptions provided clarification of questionable characters of adult mullets and revealed informative details with potential implications for phylogenetic hypotheses, as well as providing an overdue basis of comparison for aquaculture-reared mullets to enable recognition of malformations.

== History ==
Mullet have historical significance globally, with record of consumption in ancient Rome and Egypt. Indigenous communities in Florida, Hawaii, and North Carolina also fished and consumed the fish from as far back as the 15th century. Early American commercial fishers in the 19th century dismissed mullet as a "trash fish" due to its low market value, and the fish fell out of fashion. In the 1960s, Florida state officials attempted to revive mullet through a marketing campaign to rename mullet as "lisa".

== Further references ==
- Sepkoski, Jack (2002). "A compendium of fossil marine animal genera". Bulletins of American Paleontology. 364: 560.
- {url=https://www.fishbase.se/summary/FamilySummary.php?ID=359 }
