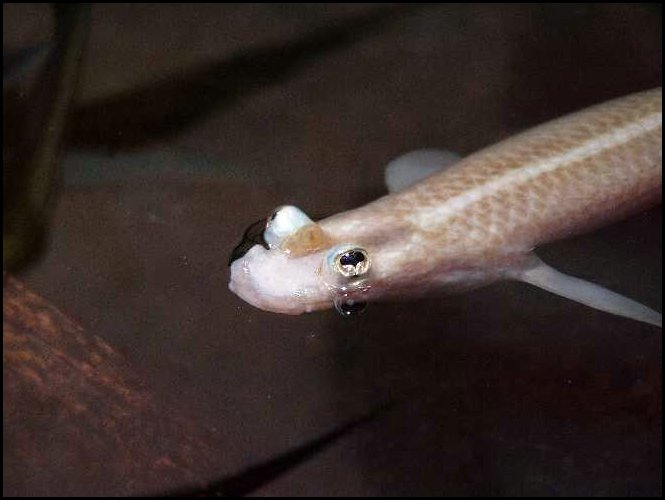
- Four-eyed fish, Anableps sp.

Scientific classification
- Domain: Eukaryota
- Kingdom: Animalia
- Phylum: Chordata
- Class: Actinopterygii
- Order: Cyprinodontiformes
- Superfamily: Poecilioidea
- Family: Anablepidae; Bonaparte, 1831

Subfamilies
- See text

= Anablepidae =

Family of ray-finned fishes

Anablepidae is a family of ray-finned fishes which live in brackish and freshwater habitats from southern Mexico to southern South America. There are three genera with sixteen species: the four-eyed fishes (genus Anableps), the onesided livebearers (genus Jenynsia) and the white-eye, Oxyzygonectes dovii. Fish of this family eat mostly insects and other invertebrates.

== Reproduction ==
Fish in the subfamily Oxyzygonectinae are ovoviviparous. The Anablepinae are livebearers. They mate on one side only, right-"handed" males with left-"handed" females and vice versa. The male has specialized anal rays which are greatly elongated and fused into a tube called a gonopodium associated with the sperm duct which he uses as an intromittent organ to deliver sperm to the female.

== Subfamilies and genera ==
The family is divided into two subfamilies and three genera:

- Anablepinae Bonaparte, 1831
  - Anableps Scopoli, 1777
  - Jenynsia Günther, 1866
- Oxyzygonectinae Parenti, 1981
  - Oxyzygonectes Fowler, 1916
