= Fauna of India =

Native animals of India

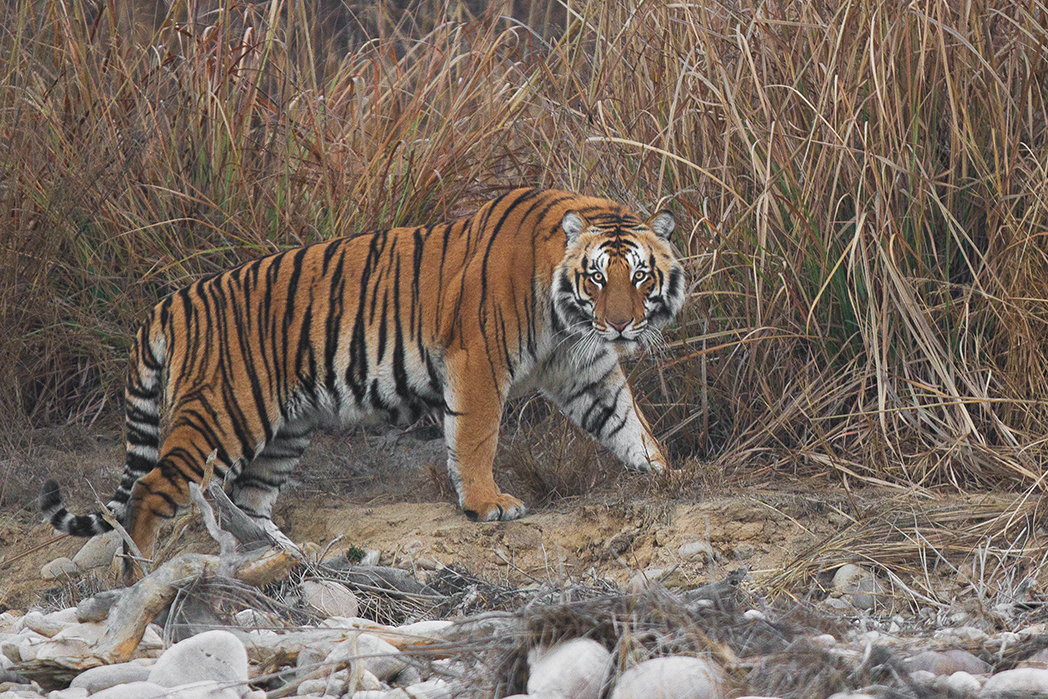
Bengal tiger

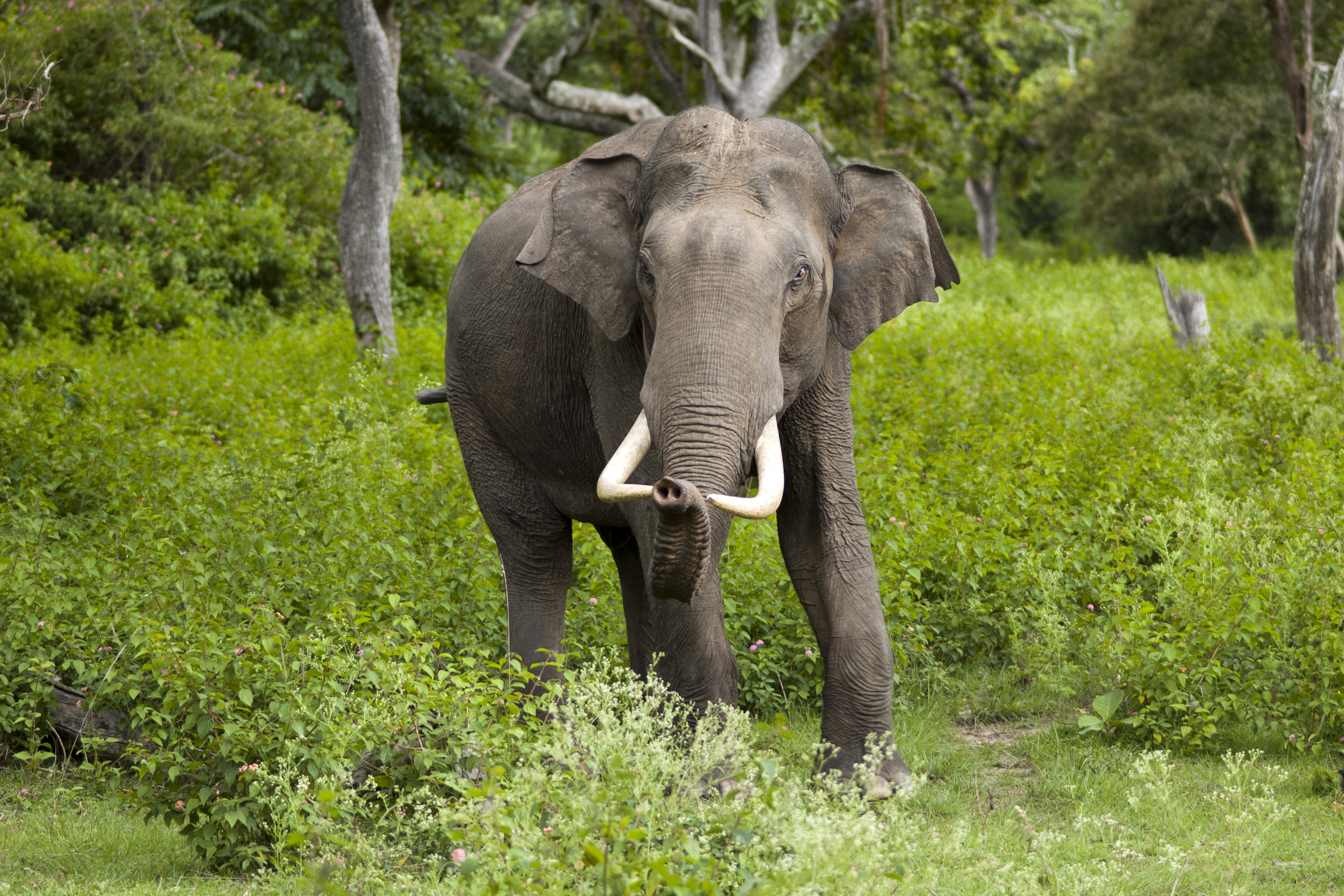
Indian elephant

India is the world's 8th most biodiverse region with a 0.46 BioD score on diversity index, 102,718 species of fauna and 23.39% of the nation's geographical area under forest and tree cover in 2020. India encompasses a wide range of biomes: desert, high mountains, highlands, tropical and temperate forests, swamplands, plains, grasslands, areas surrounding rivers, as well as island archipelago. Officially, four out of the 36 Biodiversity Hotspots in the world are present in India: the Himalayas, the Western Ghats, the Indo-Burma and the Nicobar Islands. To these may be added the Sundarbans and the Terrai-Duar Savannah grasslands for their unique foliage and animal species. These hotspots have numerous endemic species. Nearly 5% of India's total area is formally classified under protected areas .

India, for the most part, lies within the Indomalayan realm, with the upper reaches of the Himalayas forming part of the Palearctic realm; the contours of 2000 to 2500m are considered to be the altitudinal boundary between the Indo-Malayan and Palearctic zones. India displays significant biodiversity. One of seventeen megadiverse countries, it is home to 7.6% of all mammalian, 12.6% of all avian, 6.2% of all reptilian, 4.4% of all amphibian and 11.7% of all fish.

The region is also heavily influenced by summer monsoons that cause major seasonal changes in vegetation and habitat. India forms a large part of the Indomalayan biogeographical zone and many of the floral and faunal forms show Malayan affinities with only a few taxa being unique to the Indian region. The unique forms include the snake family Uropeltidae found only in the Western Ghats and Sri Lanka. Fossil taxa from the Cretaceous show links to the Seychelles and Madagascar chain of islands. The Cretaceous fauna include reptiles, amphibians and fishes and an extant species demonstrating this phylogeographical link is the purple frog. The separation of India and Madagascar is traditionally estimated to have taken place about 88 million years ago. However, there are suggestions that the links to Madagascar and Africa were present even at the time when the Indian subcontinent met Eurasia. India has been suggested as a ship for the movement of several African taxa into Asia. These taxa include five frog families (including the Myobatrachidae), three caecilian families, a lacertid lizard and freshwater snails of the family Pomatiopsidae. A thirty million-year-old Oligocene-era fossil tooth from the Bugti Hills of central Pakistan has been identified as from a lemur-like primate, prompting controversial suggestions that the lemurs may have originated in Asia. Lemur fossils from India in the past led to theories of a lost continent called Lemuria. This theory however was dismissed when continental drift and plate tectonics became well established.

India is home to several well-known large mammals, including the Asian elephant, Bengal tiger, Asiatic lion, Indian leopard and Indian rhinoceros. Some of these animals are engrained in Indian culture, often being associated with deities. These large mammals are important for wildlife tourism in India, with several national parks and wildlife sanctuaries catering to these needs. The popularity of these charismatic animals has greatly helped conservation efforts in India. The tiger has been particularly important, and Project Tiger, started in 1972, was a major effort to conserve the tiger and its habitats. Project Elephant, though less known, started in 1992 and works for elephant protection. Most of India's rhinos today survive in the Kaziranga National Park.

Some other well-known large Indian mammals are ungulates such as the water buffalo, nilgai, gaur and several species of deer and antelope. Some members of the dog family such as the Indian wolf, Bengal fox, golden jackal and the dhole or wild dogs are also widely distributed. It is also home to the striped hyena. Many smaller animals such as macaques, langurs and mongoose species are especially well known due to their ability to live close to or inside urban areas.

The majority of conservation research attention on wildlife in India is focused within protected areas, though there is considerable wild fauna outside such reserves including in farmlands and in cities.

== Fauna of India ==
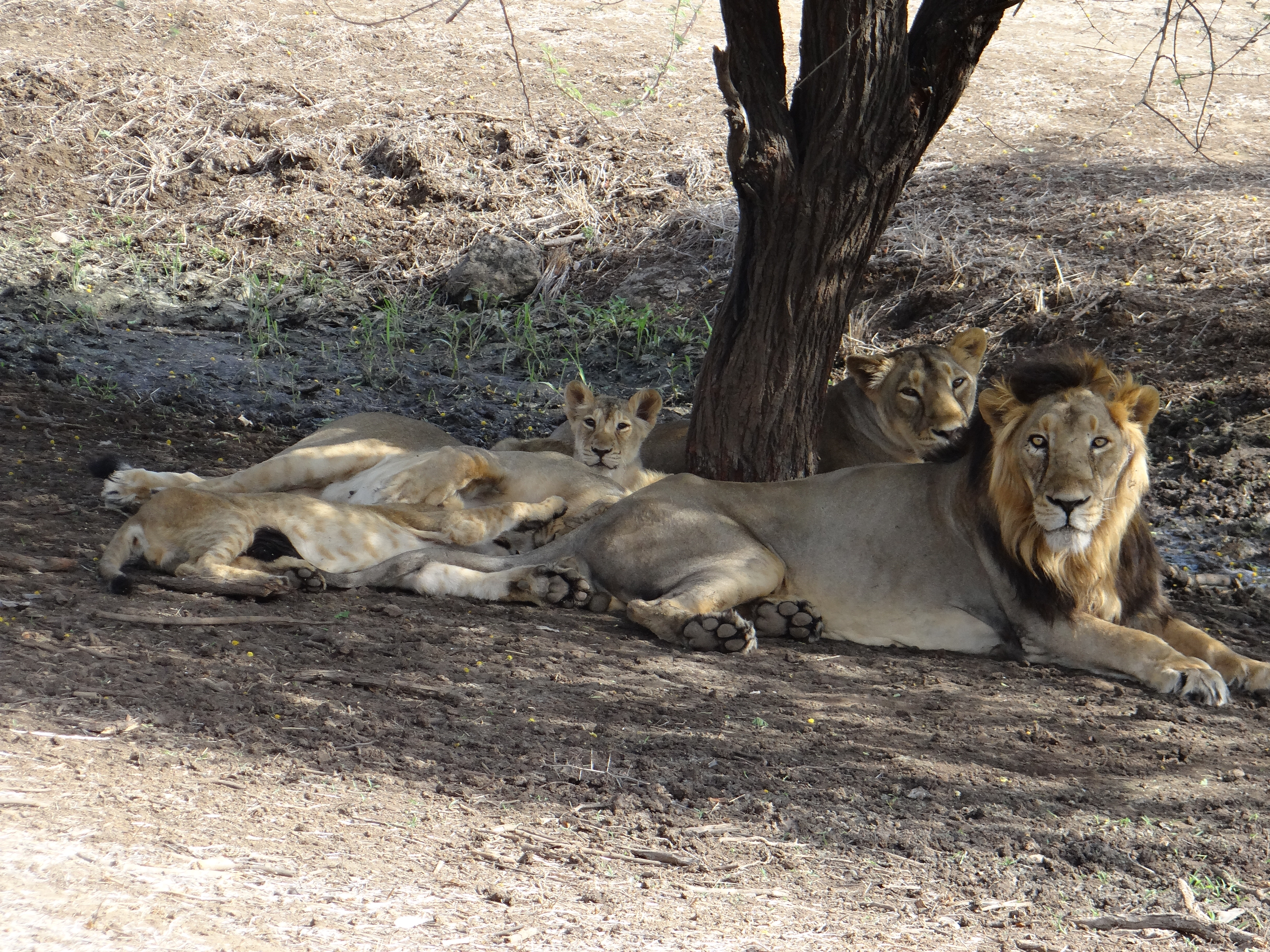
Asiatic lion pride

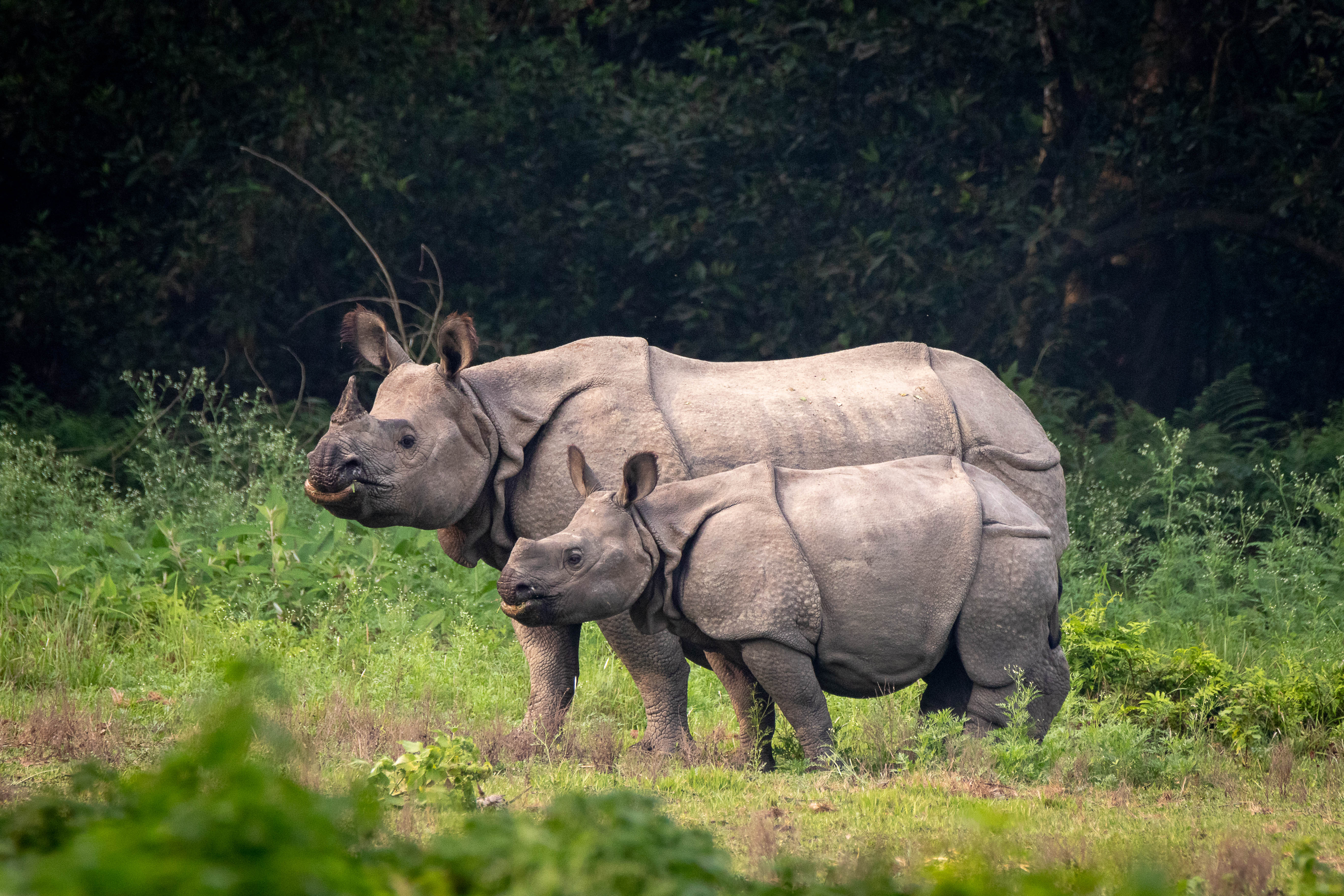
Indian rhinoceros

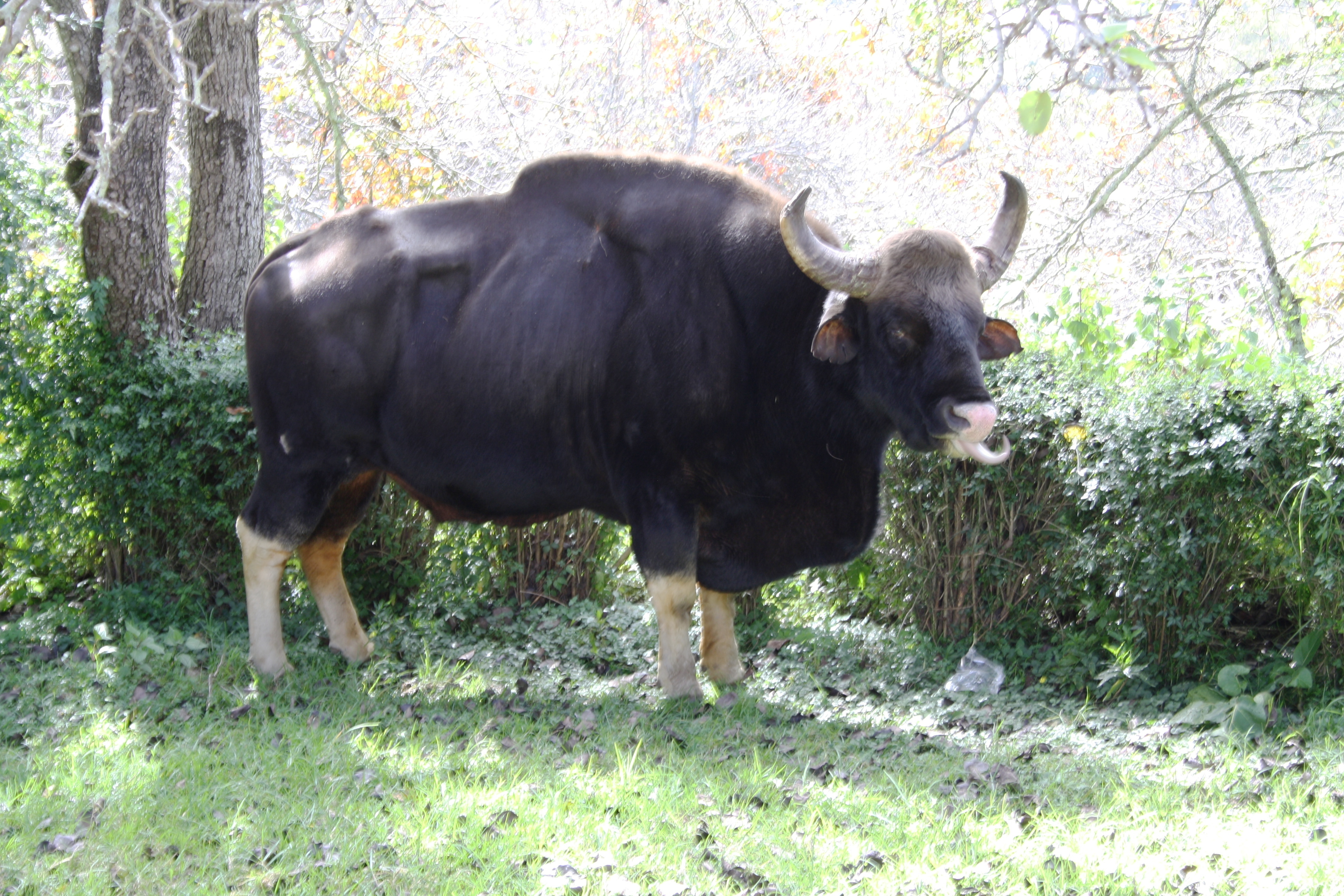
Gaur

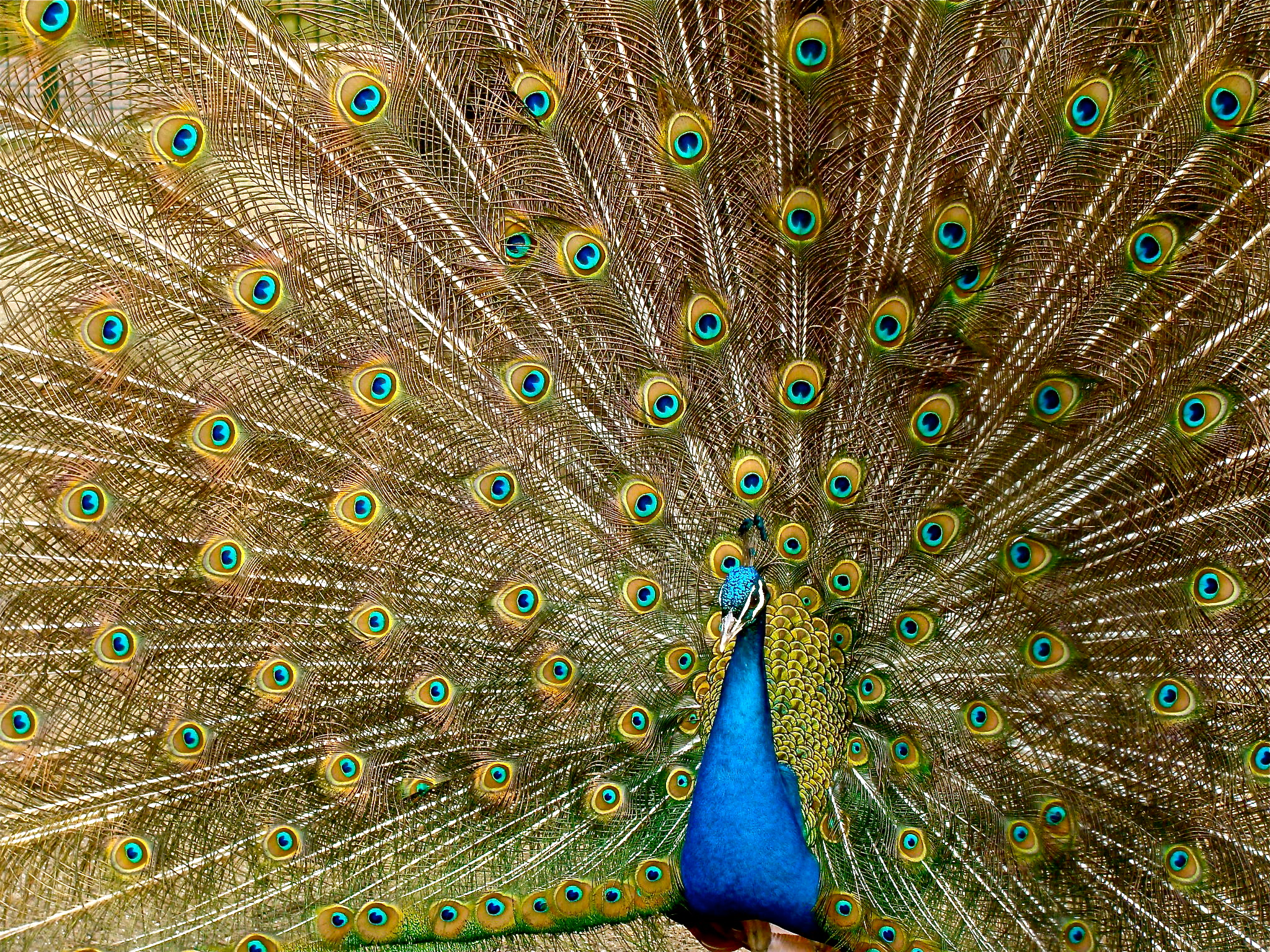
Indian peafowl

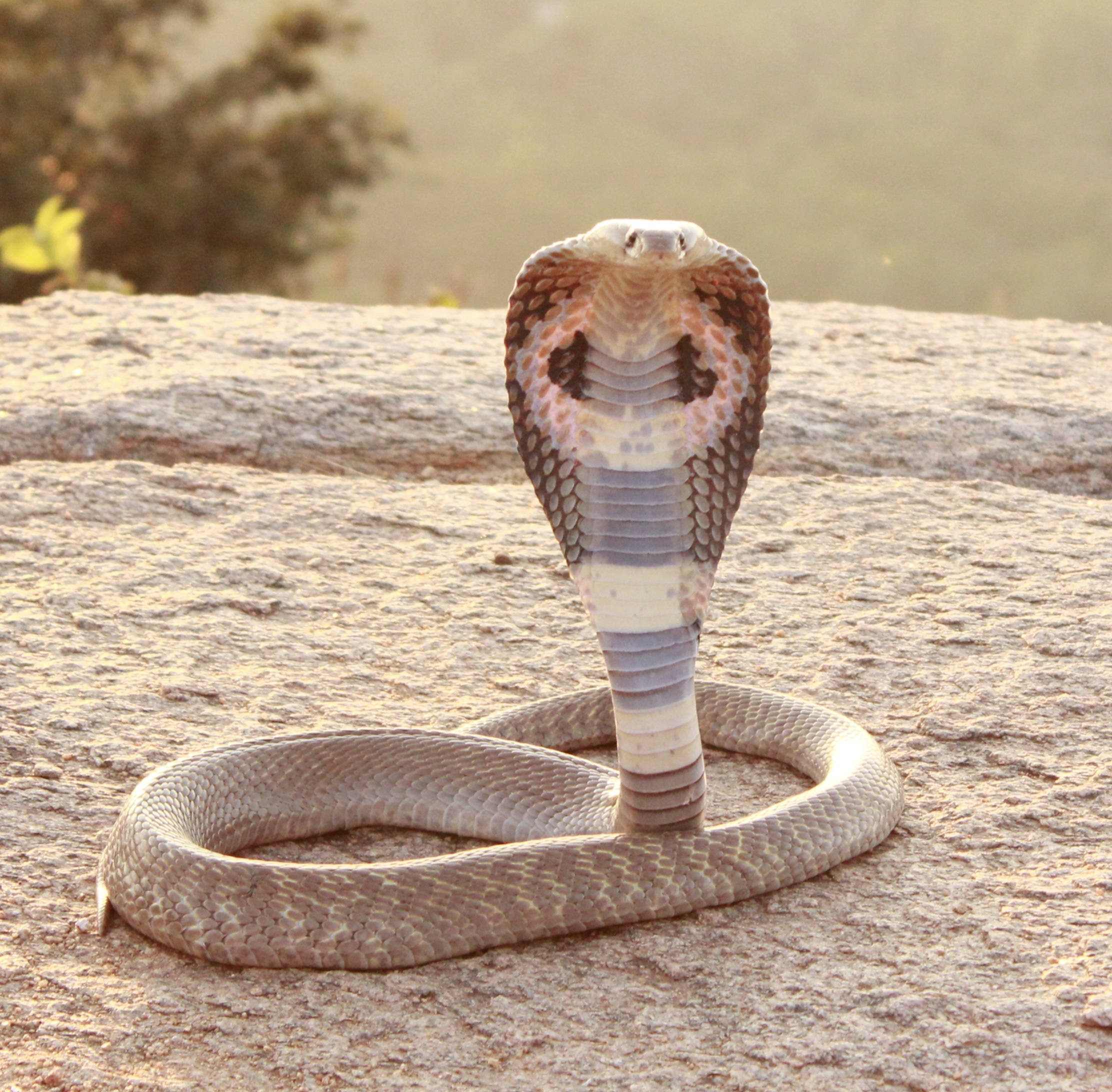
Indian cobra

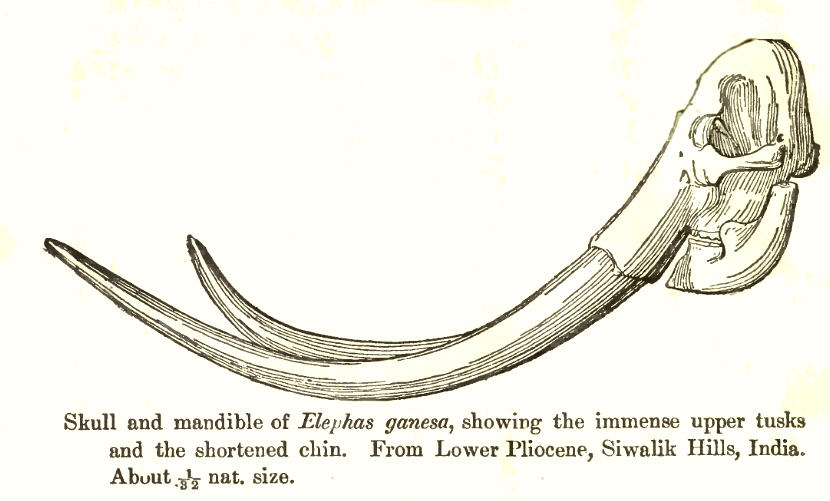
Elephas ganesa, a fossil elephant from the Siwaliks

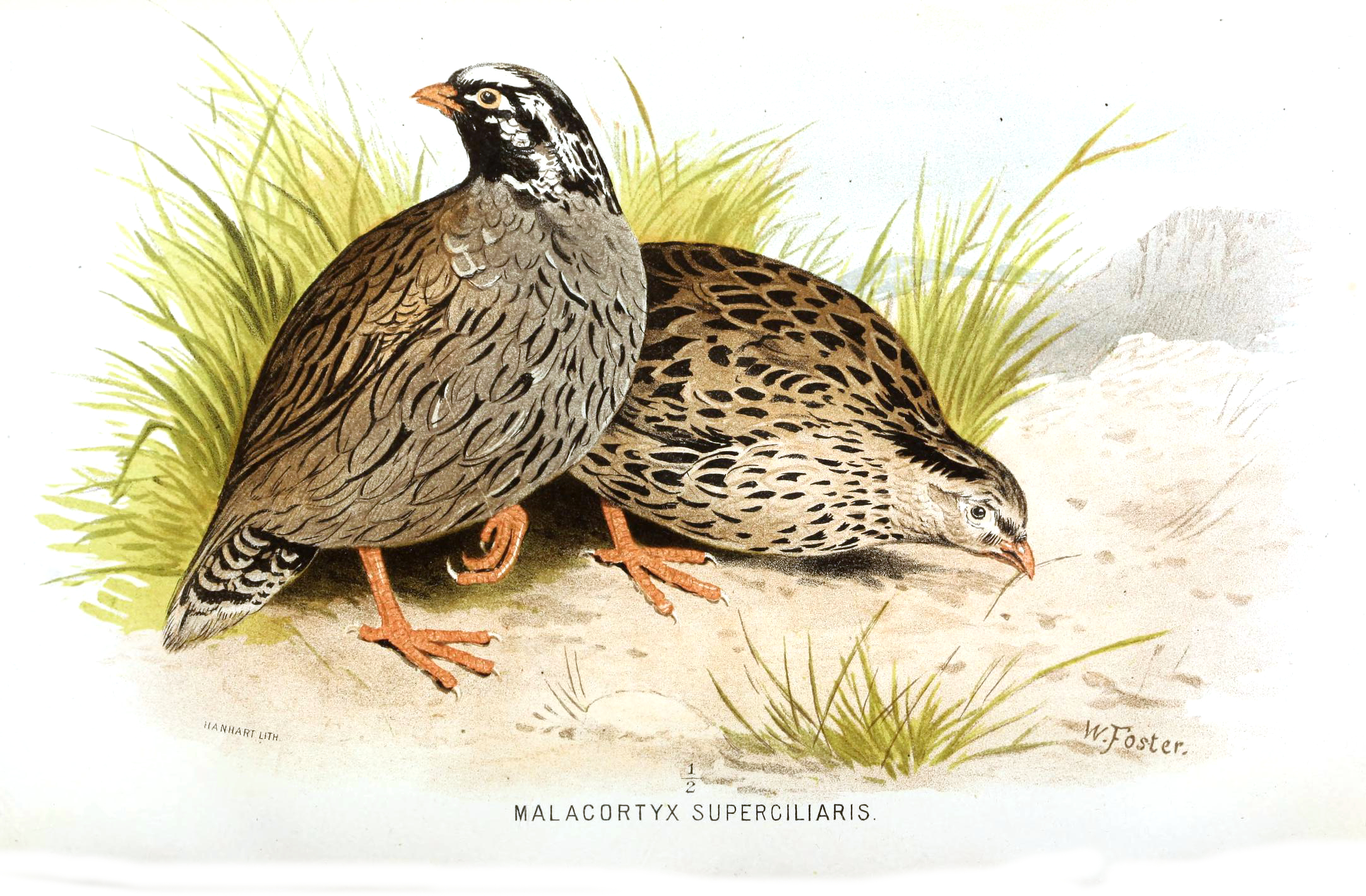
Illustration of a Himalayan quail from A. O. Hume's work. Last seen in 1876

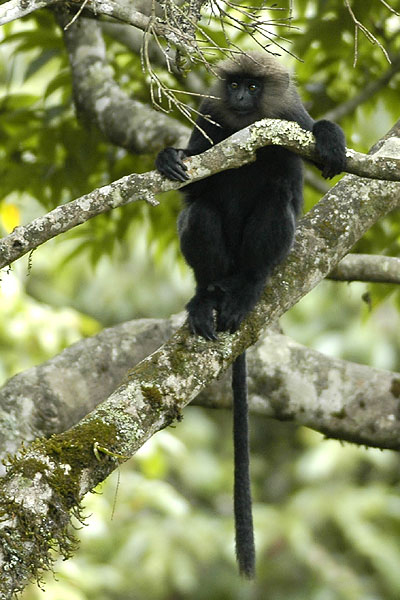
Nilgiri langur

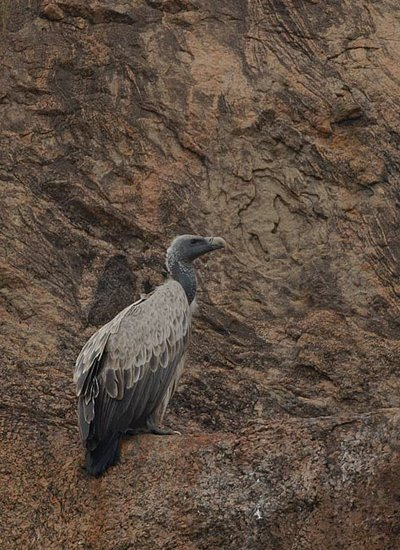
Indian vulture

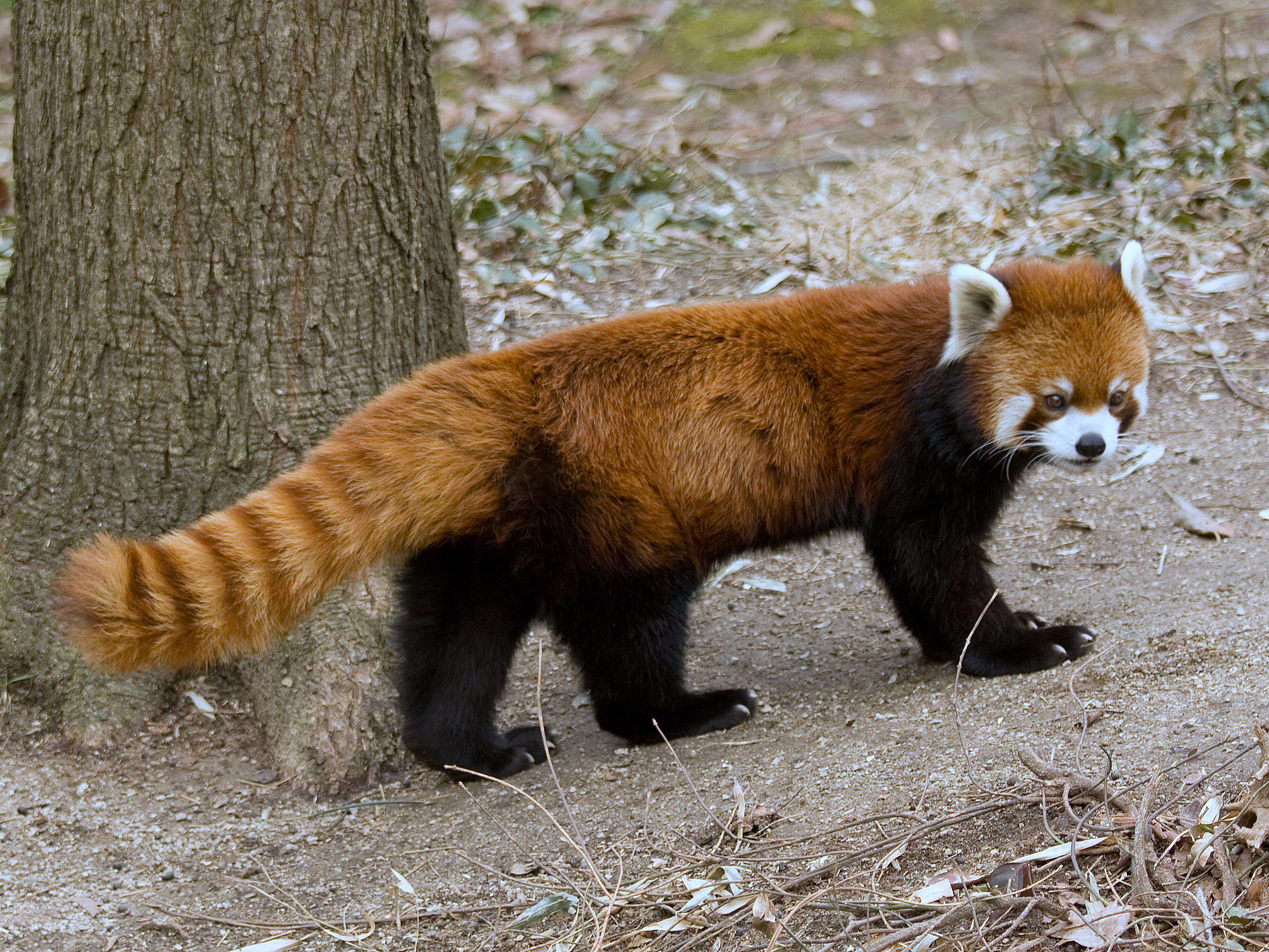
Red panda

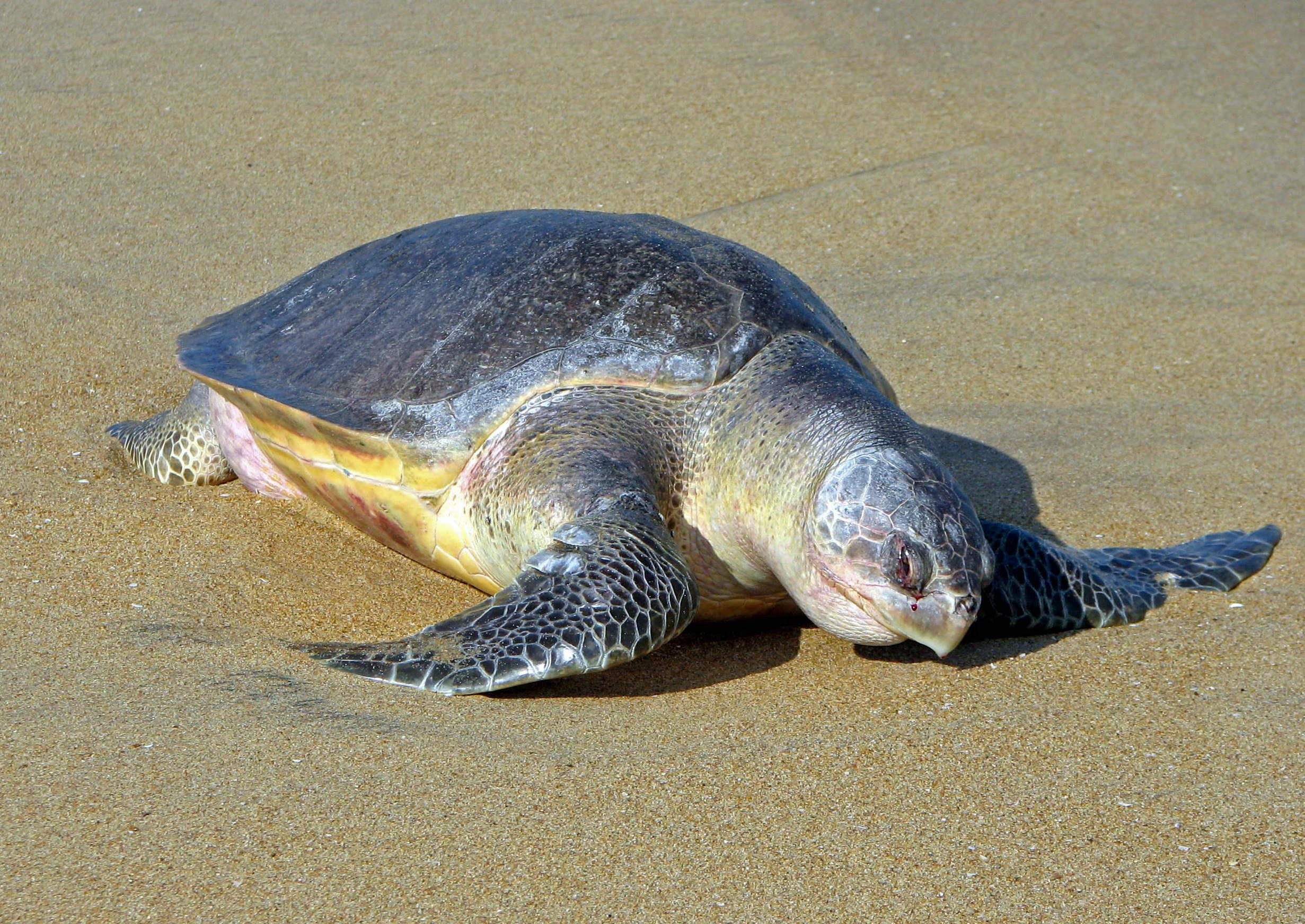
Olive ridley turtle

The Zoological Survey of India (ZSI), with its headquarters in Kolkata (the capital of West Bengal) and 16 regional stations, is responsible for surveying the faunal resources of India. Possessing a tremendous diversity of climate and physical conditions, India has a great variety of fauna, numbering 89,451 species.

The mammals include the Indian elephant, the gaur or erroneously the Indian bison - the largest of existing bovines, the great Indian rhinoceros, and the wild water buffalo. Deer and antelopes include the barasingha, the sangai, chital, sambar deer, Indian hog deer, Himalayan musk deer, Indian muntjac, northern red muntjac, Indian spotted chevrotain, Kashmir stag, Tibetan antelope, blackbuck, chausingha, goa, Indian gazelle, and nilgai. There are also wild donkeys like Indian wild ass and kiang, and caprines like Bhutan takin, Mishmi takin, red serow, Himalayan serow, red goral, Himalayan goral, markhor, Siberian ibex, Nilgiri tahr, Himalayan tahr, urial, argali, and blue sheep. These caprines are generally found in the Himalayas of Himachal Pradesh, Ladakh, and Jammu and Kashmir (union territory), as well as the Dooars forest and the Terai region, floodplains at the base of the Himalayas. A notable exception is the Nilgiri tahr, which is endemic to the Nilgiri Hills of Tamil Nadu. There are several big cats; the Asiatic lion, Bengal tiger, Indian leopard, snow leopard, clouded leopard, Turkestan lynx and caracal. Lesser cat species include fishing cat, Asiatic wildcat, jungle cat, Pallas's cat, Bengal cat, marbled cat, Asian golden cat, rusty-spotted cat, and leopard cat. There are also canines such as Ussuri dhole, Indian jackal, Indian wolf, Bengal fox, Tibetan wolf, and Tibetan fox. Another carnivore is the striped hyena.

Several birds, like greater flamingos, Brahminy ducks, white-breasted waterhen, pheasant-tailed jacana, Eurasian spoonbills, lesser flamingos, purple herons, great and cattle egret, Indian pond herons, oriental magpie-robins, Nicobar pigeons, Indian mynas, Indian rollers, slaty-breasted rails, greater coucals, black-bellied terns, Indian pittas, Indian paradise flycatchers, sarus cranes, Siberian cranes, demoiselle cranes, great hornbills, rose-ringed parakeets, vernal hanging parrots, knob-billed ducks, painted storks, and Asian openbills are found in the various habitats of the country. The Indian peafowl is the national bird of India. Pheasants include red junglefowl, grey junglefowl, Himalayan monals, satyr tragopans, and kalij pheasants; the great Indian bustard is also common in grasslands. Predatory birds include the Northern goshawk, shikra, black kite, white-bellied sea eagle, golden eagle, peregrine falcon, Indian vulture, slender-billed vulture, and white-backed vulture. The house crow and Indian jungle crow are some crow species in India. Chestnut-bellied sandgrouse is a sandgrouse found in India.

There are several species of small mammals in India. These include the Asian house shrew, the northern and greater hog badger, the Chinese ferret-badger, the honey badger, the Indian pangolin, and the Chinese pangolin. Arboreal small mammals include the Nilgiri marten, small-toothed palm civet, Asian palm civet, small Indian civet, large Indian civet, binturong, and red panda. The bears of India are sun bear, sloth bear, Himalayan black bear, and Himalayan brown bear.

There are also many primates in India. The apes of India are the gibbons; western hoolock gibbon and eastern hoolock gibbon. Macaques include rhesus macaque, bonnet macaque, lion-tailed macaque, Northern pig-tailed macaque, stump-tailed macaque, Arunachal macaque, white-cheeked macaque and Assamese macaque among others. The various species of langurs include purple-faced langur, the Nilgiri langur, the Gee's golden langur and capped langur. There is also the Phayre's leaf monkey and slender loris. The suids in India are Indian boar and the critically endangered pygmy hog. There are lagomorphs like the critically endangered hispid hare, the woolly hare and the black-naped hare. The Royle's pika and Himalayan marmot are some of the montane small mammals. There is also the large Malabar giant squirrel, Indian palm squirrel, Indian giant flying squirrel, Indian gerbil, porcupine species Indian crested porcupine, and hedgehog species bare-bellied hedgehog and Indian hedgehog. Another predator in India is the spotted linsang, a civet-like creature.

Many animals are domesticated in India, and seeing them in the streets of villages and even cities is common. Bovines include the zebu, which descended from the extinct Indian aurochs, the domestic water buffalo, the gayal, which is a domesticated gaur, and in the northern regions domestic yak, which descended from the also native wild yak. Dromedary camel can be found in desert states like Rajasthan, Gujarat, and Punjab. Mongrel dogs are a common sight in most cities of India. Other small mammals found throughout urban areas are several species of mongoose, as well as the Himalayan mole and white-tailed mole. These mongoose species are ruddy mongoose, Indian grey mongoose, Indian brown mongoose, small Indian mongoose, stripe-necked mongoose, and crab-eating mongoose. Smaller rodents include the little Indian field mouse, house mouse, flat-haired mouse, the greater and lesser bandicoot rat, black rat, and Malabar spiny dormouse. There is a diverse array of bats, such as the Indian flying fox, lesser short-nosed fruit bat, Kolar leaf-nosed bat, Indian roundleaf bat, wrinkle-lipped free-tailed bat, and great woolly horseshoe bat. The desert locust is infamous for destroying crops.

Rivers and lakes harbour mugger crocodiles and gharials. The saltwater crocodile is found along the eastern coast and in the Andaman and Nicobar Islands. A project for breeding crocodiles started in 1974, has been instrumental in saving the crocodile from extinction. Snakes include king cobra, Indian cobra, monocled cobra, Indian rock python, reticulated python, Sri Lankan green vine snake, Brahminy blind snake, white-lipped pit viper, Salazar's pit viper, bamboo pit viper, Russell's viper, saw-scaled viper and Indian krait, with aquatic species including beaked sea snake, annulated sea snake, yellow-bellied sea snake, and yellow-lipped sea krait. The cobras are an important part of Indian culture. India's coasts are home to sea turtles; these include the leatherback sea turtle, green sea turtle, hawksbill sea turtle, loggerhead sea turtle, and olive ridley sea turtle. Indian softshell turtles, Indian peacock softshell turtles, red-crowned roofed turtles, critically endangered northern river terrapins, Indian pond terrapins, Assam roofed turtles, keeled box turtle, tricarinate hill turtle, Cochin forest cane turtle, and Indian flapshell turtles are found in mangrove vegetation, lagoons, and freshwater and brackish bodies. Tortoises include the Indian star tortoise, Asian giant tortoise, elongated tortoise, and Travancore tortoise. The Asian water monitor, desert monitor, yellow monitor, and Bengal monitor are the monitor lizards in India; there are also several gecko species, like the golden gecko, common house gecko, and Tokay gecko, and the only chameleon, Indian chameleon. Other lizards range from garden lizards, Pondichéry fan-throated lizards, and spiny-tailed lizards to Kashmir rock agamas, Haridwar agamas, and Roux's forest calotes.

Frogs include purple frog, Chunam tree frog, Malabar gliding frog, Indian balloon frog, Indian black microhylid frog, common Indian cricket frog, Indus Valley bullfrog, and Indian green frog, alongside toad species such as Asian common toad, marbled toad, Amboli toad, and Malabar torrent toad. A notable newt is the Himalayan newt; it is the only salamander in India. There are also caecilian species, like the yellow-striped caecilian and Bombay caecilian.

Fish are a major part of the Indian economy. The fish include tilapia, Atlantic pomfret, hilsa, barramundi, rohu, largetooth sawfish, Pearse's mudskipper, giant oceanic manta ray, leopard torpedo, among thousands of others. Hilsa and barramundi are important in the fishing industry of India, especially in West Bengal, as are long-whiskered catfish, reba carp, Indian knifefish, bronze featherback, fringescale sardinella, fourfinger threadfin, catla, climbing perch, Gangetic ailia, Indian river shad, Bombay duck, Mola carplet, walking catfish, mrigal carp, goldspot mullet, butterfish, greenback mullet, pabdah catfish, swamp barb, pool barb, olive barb, Asian stinging catfish, striped snakehead, long whiskers catfish, and paradise threadfin. These also include sharks, such as pelagic and common thresher sharks, great white shark, shortfin and longfin mako sharks, scalloped and great hammerhead sharks, tiger shark, and sand tiger shark. Bull sharks and Ganges sharks are also found in freshwater areas and brackish areas such as the Sundarbans National Park, part of the world's largest mangrove forest, the Sundarbans. Common remora and white suckerfish are commonly found attached to these sharks. Coral reefs in India are rich in fish such as royal angelfish, emperor angelfish, Indian yellowtail angelfish, ocellaris clownfish, tomato clownfish, Clark's anemonefish, powder blue tang, pea puffer, white-spotted puffer, milk-spotted pufferfish, daisy parrotfish, longnose parrotfish, blue-barred parrotfish, turkey moray, giant moray, Indian mud moray eel, Chinese trumpetfish, redtoothed triggerfish, and blackwedged butterflyfish.

Aquatic and coastal ecosystems are also home to invertebrates such as the giant river prawn and giant tiger prawn, as well as crabs such as coconut crab, red ghost crab, Indo-Pacific horseshoe crab, mangrove horseshoe crab, orange mud crab, fiddler crab, blue swimmer crab, and tree-spider crab, and lobsters such as the mud spiny lobster and flathead lobster, alongside bivalves including the fan mussel, black-lip pearl oyster, pelagic gooseneck barnacle, and black clam.

Marine dolphins along the coast of India include bottlenose dolphin, common dolphin, spinner dolphin, striped dolphin, and pantropical spotted dolphin among others. Finless porpoise are found along the coast as well. The endangered Irrawaddy dolphin is found in freshwater areas, such as Chilika Lake, alongside the Ganges river dolphin and Indus river dolphin. Blue whales, humpback whales, sperm whales, dwarf sperm whales, orcas, common minke whales, Bryde's whales, Cuvier's beaked whales, and pygmy killer whales are the most common whales. The semi-aquatic mammals in India are otters. The species of otters are Asian small-clawed otter, Eurasian otter, and smooth-coated otter. The increasingly endangered dugong is found throughout coastal estuaries and brackish water bodies.

A notable dragonfly is the Himalayan relict dragonfly. India is also known for its butterflies, such as lesser grass blue, common blue Apollo, common mime, common Mormon, and common Pierrot. The orchid mantis is an iconic mantis found in the Western Ghats of India. Laboratory stick insects and leaf insects are found in abundance.

Stegodon elephants, Indosaurus, Rajasaurus, Himalayan quail, and pink-headed duck are notable extinct animals from India. The Himalayan quail and pink-headed duck are only presumed extinct. However, there are other quails, such as rain quail in India, and the pink-headed duck's relative, the Indian spot-billed duck.

Depletion of vegetative cover due to expansion of agriculture, habitat destruction, over-exploitation, pollution, introduction of toxic imbalance in community structure, epidemics, floods, droughts, and cyclones, contribute to the loss of flora and fauna. More than 39 species of mammals, 72 species of birds, 17 species of reptiles, three species of amphibians, two species of fish, and a large number of butterflies, moths, and beetles are considered vulnerable and endangered.

== Biodiversity ==
India is listed 12th among the mega-biodiverse nations in the world with a BioD score of 0.46 on the diversity index "which is calculated by its percentage of species in each group relative to the total global number of species in each group". With 23.39% of its geographical area under forest and tree cover, India is rich in biodiversity. A 2020 faunal survey of India by the Zoological Survey of India (ZSI) reported a total of 102,718 species of fauna, with 557 new species including 407 newly described species and 150 new country records. Among the new finds, 486 species were invertebrates (mostly insects), and 71 were vertebrate species, mostly fishes and reptiles. New species were reported from Karnataka (66 species), Kerala (51), Rajasthan (46) and West Bengal (30). From 2010 to 2020, 4,112 species, including 2,800 new species and 1,312 new records, were added to the Indian fauna.

There is insufficient information about the invertebrate fauna of India, with significant work having been done only in a few groups of insects, notably the butterflies, Odonata and Hymenoptera, mostly in The Fauna of British India, Including Ceylon and Burma series.

There are about 2,546 species of fishes (about 11% of the world species) found in Indian waters. About 197 species of amphibians (4.4% of the world total) and more than 408 reptile species (6% of the world total) are found in India. Among these groups the highest levels of endemism are found in the amphibians.

There are about 1361 species of birds recorded from India, with some variations, depending on taxonomic treatments, accounting for about 12% of the world species.

There are about 410 species of mammals known from India, which is about 8.86% of the world species.

India has the greatest number of cat species in the world.

The World Conservation Monitoring Centre gives an estimate of about 15,000 species of flowering plants in India.

== Biodiversity hotspots ==
=== The Western Ghats ===
The Western Ghats are a chain of hills that run along the western edge of peninsular India. Their proximity to the ocean and through orographic effect, they receive high rainfall. These regions have moist deciduous forest and rain forest. The region shows high species diversity as well as high levels of endemism. Nearly 77% of the amphibians and 62% of the reptile species found here are found nowhere else. The region shows biogeographical affinities to the Malayan region, and the Satpura hypothesis proposed by Sunder Lal Hora suggests that the hill chains of Central India may have once formed a connection with the forests of northeastern India and into the Indo-Malayan region. Hora used torrent stream fishes to support the theory, but it was also suggested to hold for birds. Later studies have suggested that Hora's original model species were a demonstration of convergent evolution rather than speciation by isolation.

More recent phylogeographic studies have attempted to study the problem using molecular approaches. There are also differences in taxa which are dependent on time of divergence and geological history. Along with Sri Lanka this region also shows some fauna similarities with the Madagascan region especially in the reptiles and amphibians. Examples include the Sinophis snakes, the purple frog and Sri Lankan lizard genus Nessia which appears similar to the Madagascan genus Acontias. Numerous floral links to the Madagascan region also exist. An alternate hypothesis that these taxa may have originally evolved out-of-India has also been suggested.

Bio geographical quirks exist with some taxa of Malayan origin occurring in Sri Lanka but absent in the Western Ghats. These include insects groups such as the plants such as those of the genus Nepenthes.

=== The Eastern Himalayas ===
The Eastern Himalayas is the region encompassing Bhutan, northeastern India, West Bengal, and southern, central and eastern Nepal. The region is geologically young and shows high altitudinal variation. It has nearly 163 globally threatened species including the one-horned rhinoceros (Rhinoceros unicornis), the Wild Asian water buffalo (Bubalus bubalis (Arnee)) and in all 45 mammals, 50 birds, 17 reptiles, 12 amphibians, 3 invertebrate and 36 plant species. The Dooars forest in the Terai is a biologically diverse area, with Himalayan biodiversity as well as tropical biodiversity. The relict dragonfly (Epiophlebia laidlawi) is an endangered species found here with the only other species in the genus being found in Japan. The region is also home to the Himalayan newt (Tylototriton verrucosus), the only salamander species found within Indian limits.

== Extinct and fossil forms ==
During the early Tertiary period, the Indian tableland, what is today peninsular India, was a large island. Prior to becoming an island, it was connected to the African region. During the tertiary period, this island was separated from the Asian mainland by a shallow sea. The Himalayan region and the greater part of Tibet lay under this sea. The movement of the Indian subcontinent into the Asian landmass created the great Himalayan ranges and raised the sea bed into, what is today, the plains of northern India.

Once connected to the Asian mainland, many species moved into India. The Himalayas were created in several upheavals. The Siwaliks were formed at the last and the largest number of fossils of the Tertiary period are found in these ranges.

The Siwalik fossils include mastodons, hippopotamus, rhinoceros, sivatherium, a large four-horned ruminant, giraffe, horses, camels, bison, deer, antelope, gorillas, pigs, chimpanzees, orangutans, baboons, langurs, macaques, cheetahs, sabre-toothed cats, lions, tigers, sloth bear, Aurochs, leopards, wolves, dholes, porcupines, rabbits and a host of other mammals.

Many fossil tree species have been found in the intertrappean beds, including Grewioxylon from the Eocene and Heritieroxylon keralensis from the middle Miocene in Kerala and Heritieroxylon arunachalensis from the Mio-Pliocene of Arunachal Pradesh and at many other places. The discovery of Glossopteris fern fossils from India and Antarctica led to the discovery of Gondwanaland and led to the greater understanding of continental drift. Fossil Cycads are known from India while seven Cycad species continue to survive in India.

Titanosaurus indicus was perhaps the first dinosaur discovered in India by Richard Lydekker in 1877 in the Narmada valley. This area has been one of the most important areas for paleontology in India. Another dinosaur known from India is Rajasaurus narmadensis, a heavy-bodied and stout carnivorous abelisaurid (theropod) dinosaur that inhabited the area near present-day Narmada river. It was 9 m in length and 3 m in height and somewhat horizontal in posture with a double-crested crown on the skull.

Some fossil snakes from the Cenozoic era are also known.

Some scientists have suggested that the Deccan lava flows and the gases produced were responsible for the global extinction of dinosaurs. However, these have been disputed.

Himalayacetus subathuensis, the oldest-known whale fossil of the family Protocetidae (Eocene), about 53.5 million years old was found in the Simla hills in the foothills of the Himalayas. This area was underwater (in the Tethys sea) during the Tertiary period (when India was an island off Asia). This whale may have been capable of living partly on land. Other fossil whales from India include Remingtonocetus approximately 43-46 million years old.

Several small mammal fossils have been recorded in the intertrappean beds, however larger mammals are mostly unknown. The only major primate fossils have been from the nearby region of Myanmar.

- See also Geology of India

=== Recent extinctions ===
The exploitation of land and forest resources by humans along with hunting and trapping for food and sport has led to the extinction of many species in India in recent times.

Probably the first species to vanish during the time of the Indus Valley civilisation was the species of wild cattle, Bos primegenius nomadicus or the wild zebu, which vanished from its range in the Indus valley and western India, possibly due to inter-breeding with domestic cattle and resultant fragmentation of wild populations due to loss of habitat.

Notable mammals which became or are presumed extinct within the country itself include the Indian / Asiatic cheetah, Javan rhinoceros and Sumatran rhinoceros. While some of these large mammal species are confirmed extinct, there have been many smaller animal and plant species whose status is harder to determine. Many species have not been seen since their description. Hubbardia heptaneuron, a species of grass that grew in the spray zone of the Jog Falls prior to the construction of the Linganamakki reservoir, was thought to be extinct but a few were rediscovered near Kolhapur.

Some species of birds have gone extinct in recent times, including the pink-headed duck (Rhodonessa caryophyllacea) and the Himalayan quail (Ophrysia superciliosa). A species of warbler, Acrocephalus orinus, known earlier from a single specimen collected by Allan Octavian Hume from near Rampur in Himachal Pradesh was rediscovered after 139 years in Thailand. Similarly, the Jerdon's courser (Rhinoptilus bitorquatus), named after the zoologist Thomas C. Jerdon who discovered it in 1848, was rediscovered in 1986 by Bharat Bhushan, an ornithologist at the Bombay Natural History Society after being thought to be extinct.

== Species estimates ==
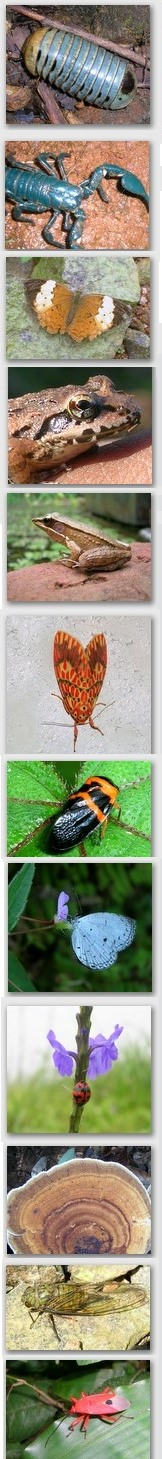
Glimpses of biodiversity

An estimate of the numbers of species by group in India is given below. This is based on Alfred, 1998.

Taxonomic group	World species	Indian species	% in India
PROTISTA
Protozoa	31250	2577	8.24
Total (Protista)	31250	2577	8.24
ANIMALIA
Mesozoa	71	10	14.08
Porifera	4562	486	10.65
Cnidaria	9916	842	8.49
Ctenophora	100	12	12
Platyhelminthes	17500	1622	9.27
Nemertinea	600
Rotifera	2500	330	13.2
Gastrotricha	3000	100	3.33
Kinorhyncha	100	10	10
Nematoda	30000	2850	9.5
Nematomorpha	250
Acanthocephala	800	229	28.62
Sipuncula	145	35	24.14
Mollusca	66535	5070	7.62
Echiura	127	43	33.86
Annelida	12700	840	6.61
Onychophora	100	1	1
Arthropoda	987949	68389	6.9
Crustacea	35534	2934	8.26
Insecta	853000	53400	6.83
Arachnida	73440		7.9
Pycnogonida	600		2.67
Pauropoda	360
Chilopoda	3000	100	3.33
Diplopoda	7500	162	2.16
Symphyla	120	4	3.33
Xiphosura	4	2	50
Phoronida	11	3	27.27
Bryozoa (Ectoprocta)	4000	200	5
Endoprocta	60	10	16.66
Brachiopoda	300	3	1
Pogonophora	80
Praipulida	8
Pentastomida	70
Chaetognatha	111	30	27.02
Tardigrada	514	30	5.83
Echinodermata	6223	765	12.29
Hemichordata	120	12	10
Chordata	48451	4952	10.22
Protochordata (Cephalochordata+Urochordata)	2106	119	5.65
Pisces	21723	2546	11.72
Amphibia	7533	350	4.63
Reptilia	5817	456	7.84
Aves	9026	1232	13.66
Mammalia	4629	390	8.42
Total (Animalia)	1196903	868741	7.25
Grand total (Protosticta+Animalia)	1228153	871318	7.09

== Taxonomic lists and indices ==
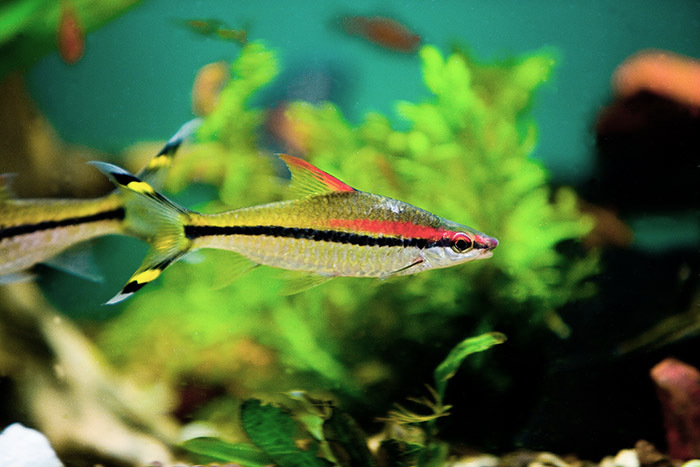
Denison Barb is endemic to the Western Ghats region of India.

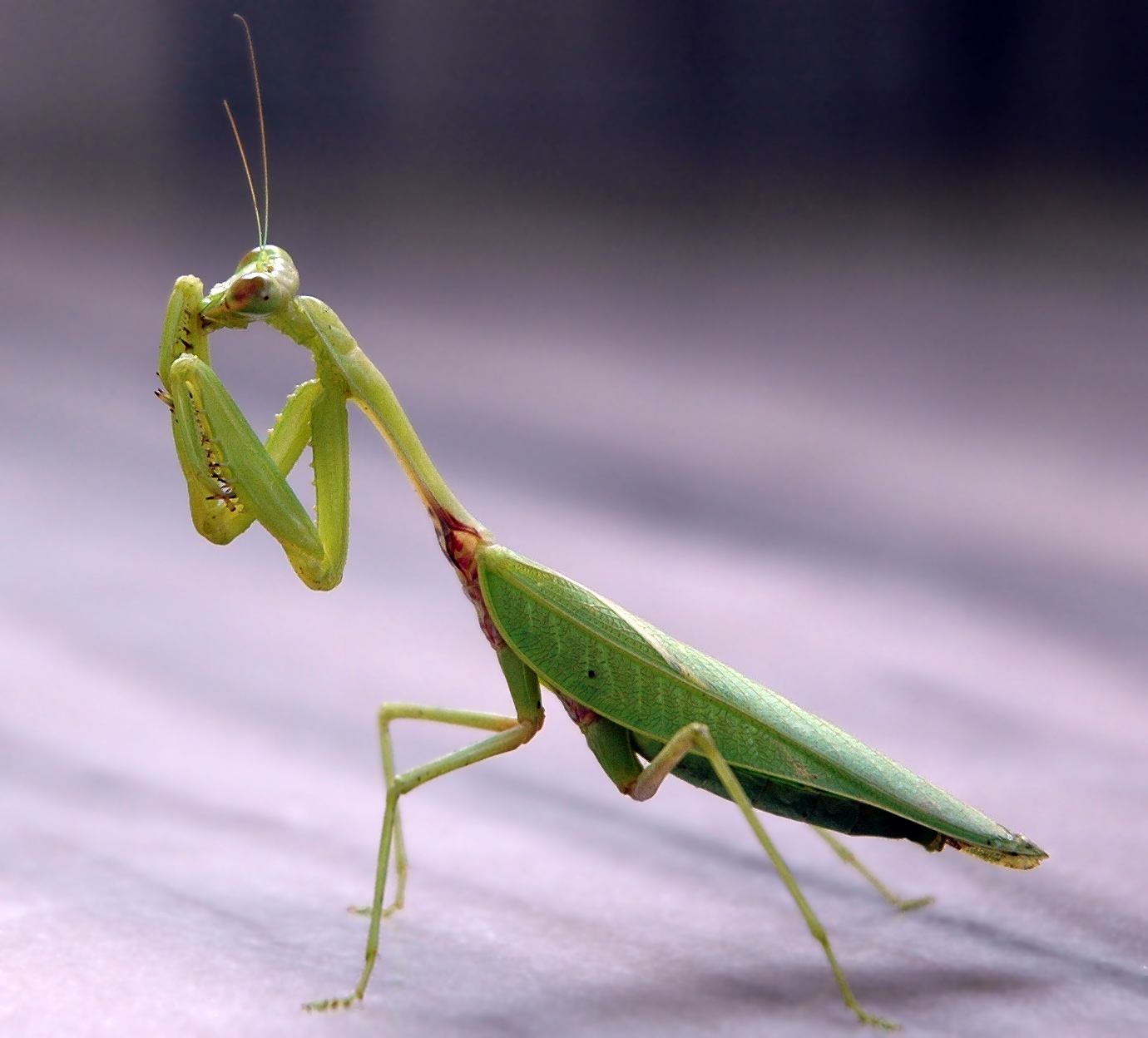
A praying mantis

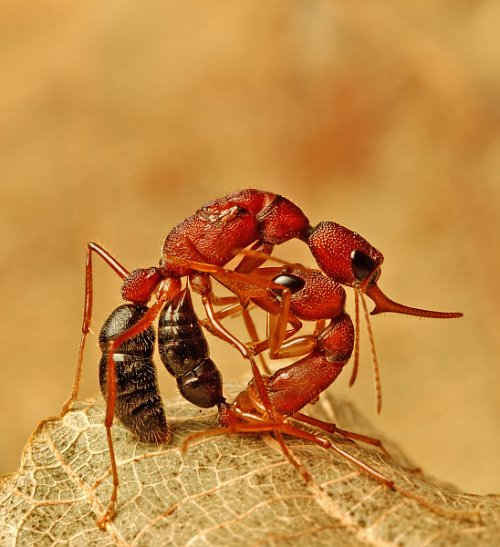
Harpegnathos saltator

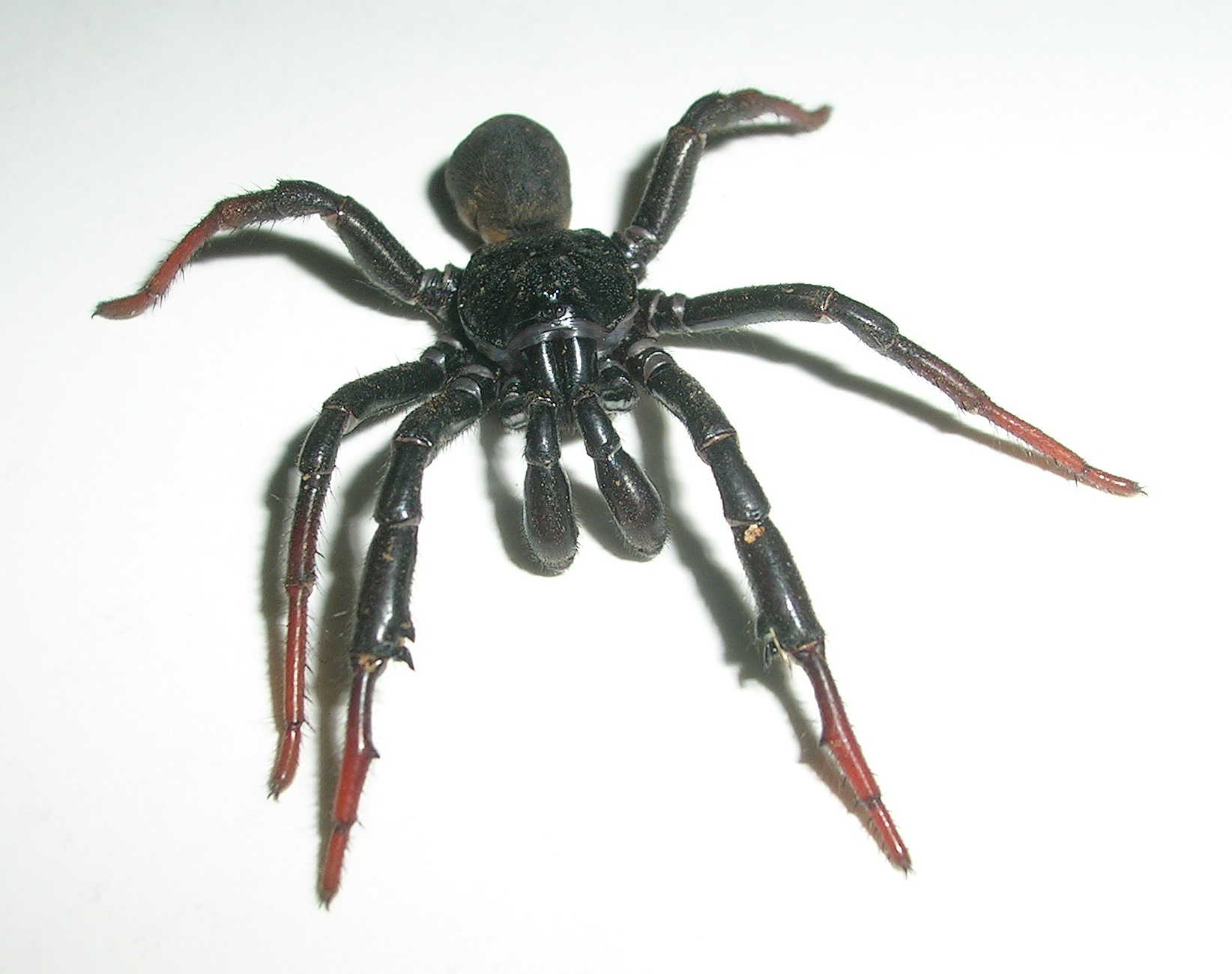
An Idiopid spider endemic to India

This section provides links to lists of species of various taxa found in India.

=== Animals ===
==== Invertebrates ====
- Molluscs
  - List of non-marine molluscs of India
- Arachnids
  - Spiders of India
- Insects
  - Odonata
    - Dragonflies and damselflies of India
  - Lepidoptera
    - Butterflies of India
      - Papilionid butterflies of India
      - Pierid butterflies of India
      - Nymphalid butterflies of India
      - Lycaenid butterflies of India
      - Hesperid butterflies of India
      - Riodinid butterflies of India
    - Moths of India
  - Hymenoptera
    - Ants of India

==== Vertebrates ====
- Fishes of India
- Amphibians of India
- Reptiles of India
  - Snakes of India
- Birds of South Asia
- Birds of India
- Mammals of India

== See also ==
- Ecoregions in India
  - Endangered mammals of India
  - Fauna of British India, Including Ceylon and Burma
  - Flora of India
  - List of Indian state birds
  - Wildlife of India
- Other related
  - Indian natural history
  - Endemic birds of South Asia
  - Indian Council of Forestry Research and Education
  - India Nature Watch
