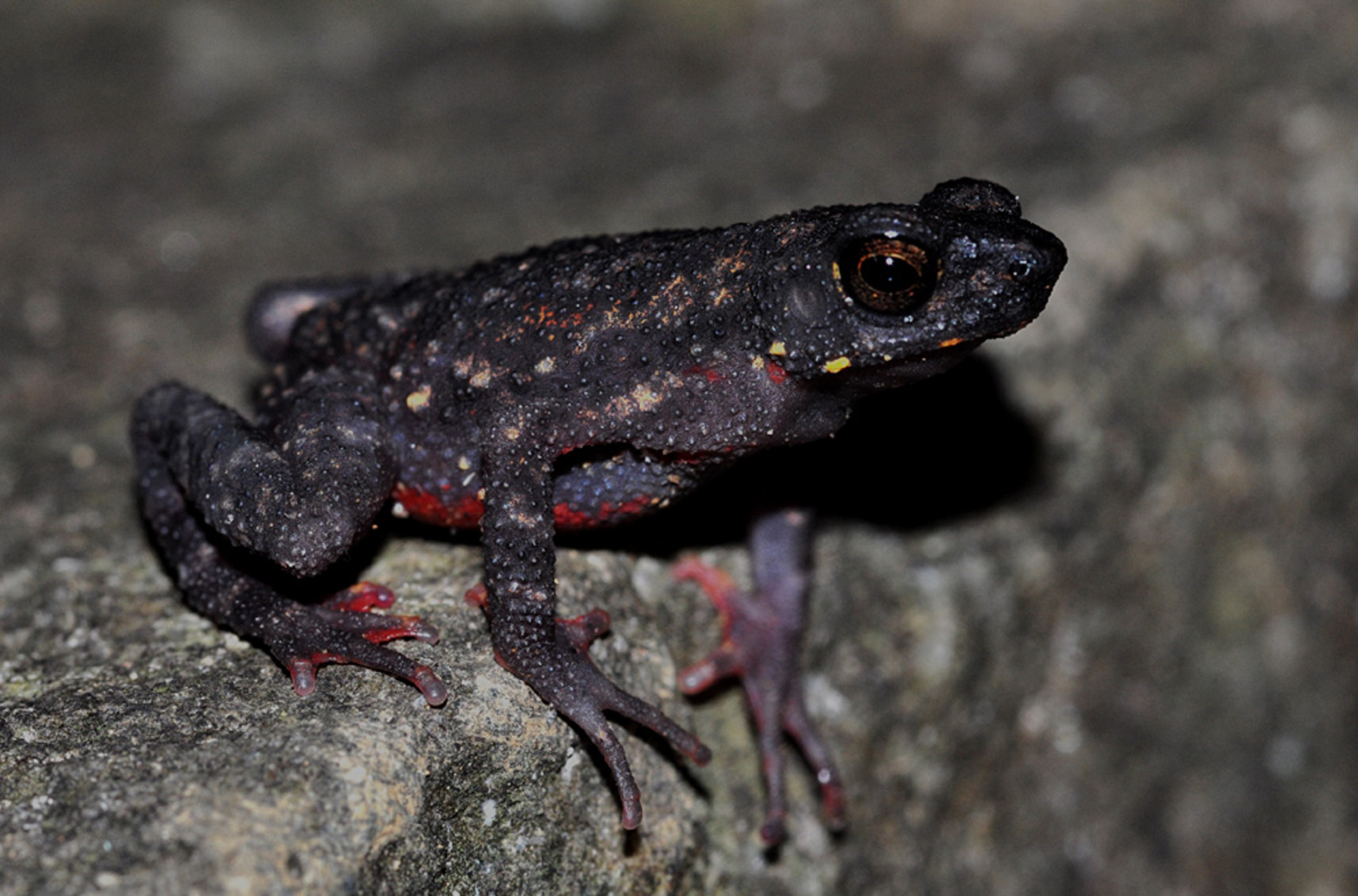
- Blaira ornata

Scientific classification
- Kingdom: Animalia
- Phylum: Chordata
- Class: Amphibia
- Order: Anura
- Family: Bufonidae
- Genus: Blaira; Dubois, Ohler, and Pyron, 2021

Type species
- Ansonia ornata Günther, "1876" 1875

Diversity
- 2 species (see text)

Synonyms
- Ghatophryne

= Blaira =

Genus of amphibians

Blaira is a small genus of true toads endemic to the southern Western Ghats, India. The genus was erected in 2021 as a valid substitute name for Ghatophryne which was created in 2009 for Ansonia ornata which was found to be distinct enough to warrant its own genus. This was however considered an invalid description as it was published in an only a digital medium (before 2012, the ICZN rules were subsequently modified); Ansonia rubigina was moved based on its morphological similarity and distribution.

== Description ==
Blaira are small-sized toads with adult males measuring up to 30 mm (1.2 in) and females up to 35 mm (1.4 in) in snout–vent length. The dorsum is reddish brown; ventrum is dark brownish black with prominent yellowish-orange spots. They do not possess parotoid glands. Fingers are free of webbing whereas the toes are medium webbed. Skin on dorsum has sparsely granular projections, especially on anterior half of the body. Eggs are non-pigmented. Tadpoles have a suctorial disk, an adaptation to mountain streams.

== Species ==
This small genus has two species at present:

- Blaira ornata (Günther, 1876) — ornate toad, Malabar torrent toad, or black torrent toad
- Blaira rubigina (Pillai and Pattabiraman, 1981) — Kerala stream toad, Silent Valley torrent toad, or red torrent toad
