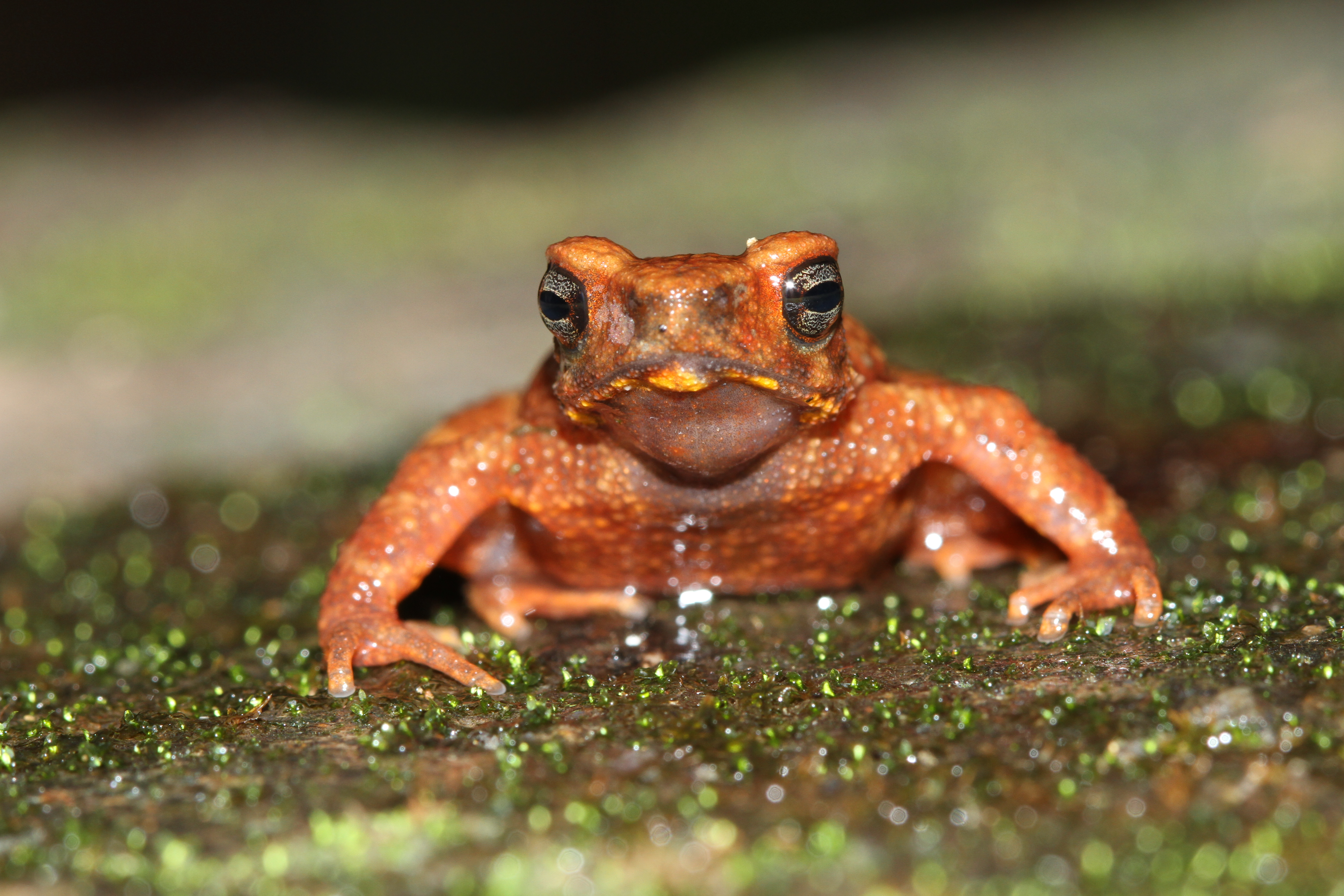

Conservation status
- Near Threatened (IUCN 3.1)

Scientific classification
- Kingdom: Animalia
- Phylum: Chordata
- Class: Amphibia
- Order: Anura
- Family: Bufonidae
- Genus: Blaira
- Species: B. rubigina

Binomial name
- Blaira rubigina (Pillai and Pattabiraman, 1981)

Synonyms
- Ansonia rubigina Pillai and Pattabiraman, 1981

= Blaira rubigina =

Species of amphibian

Blaira rubigina is a species of toad in the family Bufonidae. It is endemic to the southern Western Ghats, India, and is known from Silent Valley and Wynaad, both in Kerala. Its common names include Kerala stream toad, Silent Valley torrent toad, and red torrent toad.

== Description ==
These small-sized toads measure 36–40 mm (1.4–1.6 in) in snout–vent length. No cranial ridges nor parotoid glands are present. The tympanum is distinct and smooth. The limbs are slender. The fingers have no webbing but have swollen tips. The toes are almost fully webbed, and the toe tips are swollen. Dorsal skin, flanks, and upper side of limbs are distinctly tuberculated; ventral skin is rough and bears spine-tipped tubercles on throat and chest and flattened tubercles on belly and underside of limbs. The dorsum is brick-red. The venter is brownish-black with vermiculations. The throat is bright orange, and there are spots of the same colour on chest, belly and underside of thighs. The flanks are brownish.

== Habitat and conservation ==
Ghatophryne rubigina occurs in tropical evergreen forest at elevations of 1,000–1,200 m (3,300–3,900 ft) above sea level. It is associated with torrential streams and the forest floor. Breeding probably takes place in streams.

The population within the Silent Valley National Park is adequately protected. Nevertheless, because the species is known from so few localities, its population status requires careful monitoring.
