= Chittari River =

River in Kasaragod district, India

Chittari River is a small river that flows through the village of Chithari near Kanhangad in Kasaragod district of Kerala. Malayalam: ചിത്താരിപ്പുഴ The Chittaripuzha is 25 km long and originates from Iriya Punur. The river, which passes through various encroachments, is now on the verge of destruction. The mangrove forests around the village of Chithari are unique. Leptarma biju, a crab not found anywhere else in the world, was discovered in these forests on September 4, 2020.

== Origin ==
Chittaripuzha originates from the ponds of Iriya Vazhunnor and Pattammar in the Chettiamchal area of the district. The river is formed by the confluence of the Cheramba, Thaikolam and Pullur rivers. The tributaries of this river are Kaland, Bekal river and Chittarithodu.

== Course and Drain ==
The river flows northwards from the Chetkundu area for more than four kilometers and joins the sea at the mouth of the Ajanur estuary. Prior to this, river divides in to two and surrounds the village Chittari
