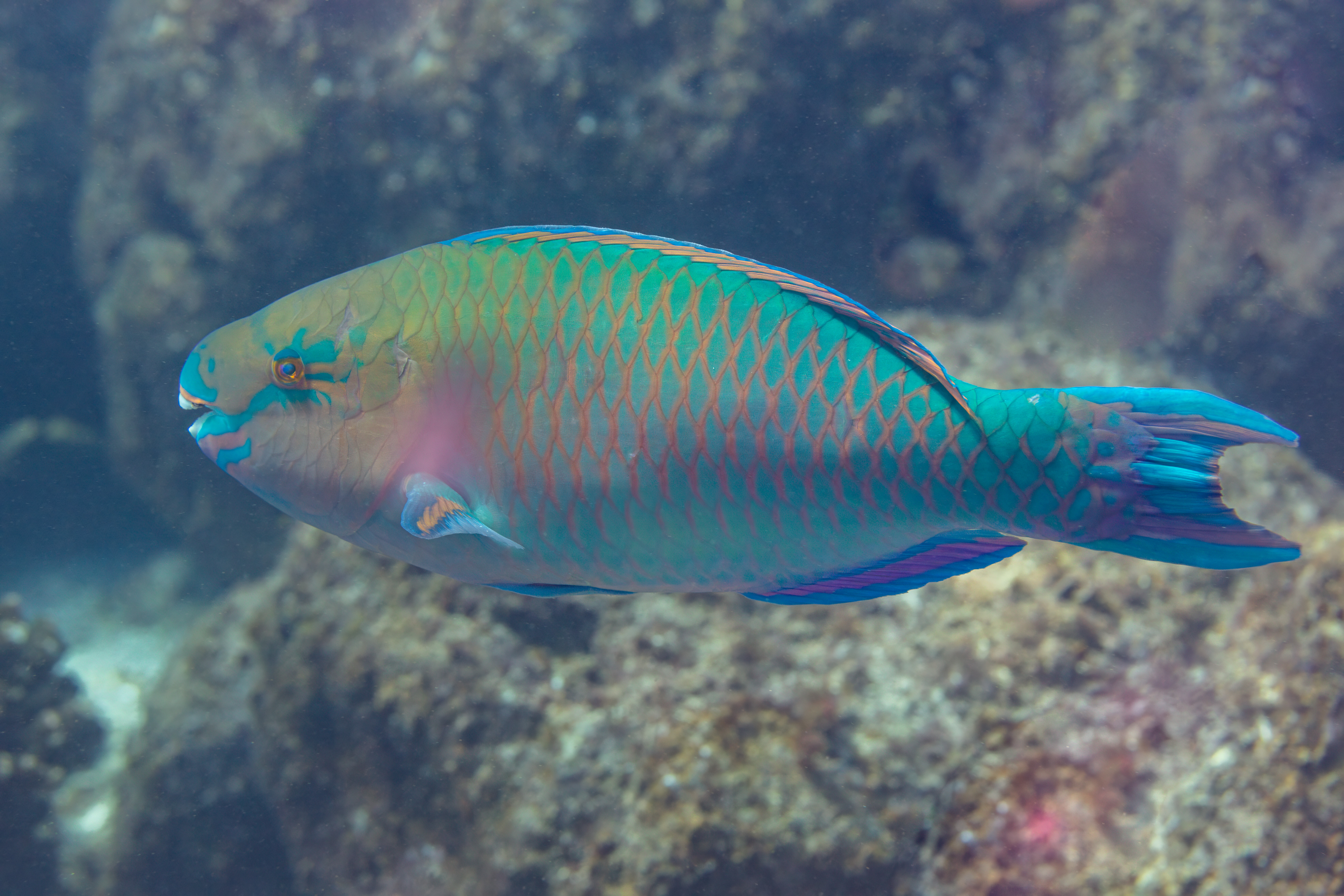

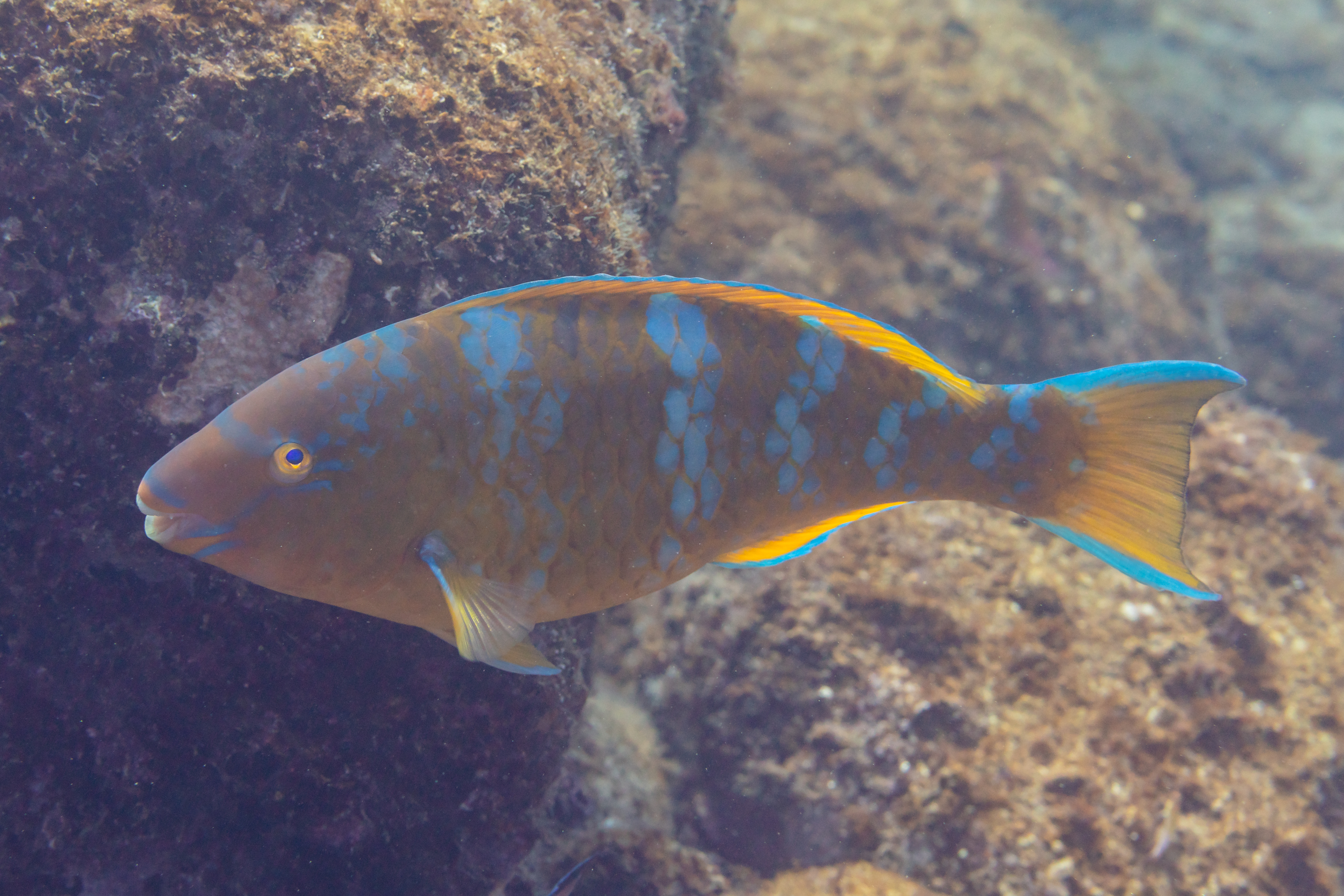
- Terminal phase (top) and initial phase (bottom), in Baja California

Conservation status
- Least Concern (IUCN 3.1)

- Endangered (IUCN 3.1)(Persian Gulf)

Scientific classification
- Kingdom: Animalia
- Phylum: Chordata
- Class: Actinopterygii
- Division: Teleostei
- Order: Labriformes
- Family: Labridae
- Genus: Scarus
- Species: S. ghobban

Binomial name
- Scarus ghobban Forsskål, 1775

Synonyms
- List: Scarus ghobban Forsskål, 1775; Callyodon ghobban (Forsskål, 1775); Scarus guttatus Bloch & Schneider, 1801; Callyodon guttatus (Bloch & Schneider, 1801); Scarus maculosus Lacépède, 1802; Scarus pepo Bennett, 1830; Scarus reticulata Swainson, 1839; Hemistoma reticulata (Swainson, 1839); Scarus lacerta Valenciennes, 1840; Scarus dussumieri Valenciennes, 1840; Callyodon dussumieri (Valenciennes, 1840); Scarus scabriusculus Valenciennes, 1840; Scarus magrathii Bennett, 1841; Scarus pyrrostethus Richardson, 1846; Scarus haridoides Bleeker, 1855; Pseudoscarus cantori Bleeker, 1861; Pseudoscarus nudirostris Alleyne & Macleay, 1877; Pseudoscarus papuensis Macleay, 1883; Pseudoscarus flavipinnis De Vis, 1885; Pseudoscarus californiensis Pellegrin, 1901; Scarus noyesi Heller & Snodgrass, 1903; Pseudoscarus natalensis Gilchrist & Thompson, 1909; Pseudoscarus garretti Günther, 1909; Scarus pyrrostethus australianus Paradice, 1927; Scarus azureus Meek & Hildebrand, 1928; Scarus toshi Whitley, 1933; Callyodon fuscocuneus Fowler, 1935; Callyodon speigleri J. L. B. Smith, 1956; Callyodon apridentatus Smith, 1956; Scarus fehlmanni Schultz, 1969

= Scarus ghobban =

Species of fish

Scarus ghobban, also known as the blue-barred parrotfish, blue trim parrotfish, cream parrotfish, globe-headed parrotfish, green blotched parrotfish, yellow scale parrotfish, and bluechin parrotfish, is a species of marine ray-finned fish in the family Scaridae.

== Distribution ==
Scarus ghobban is widespread throughout the Indo-Pacific, known from East Africa to Indonesia. It is also present in the Eastern Pacific, occurring in the Galápagos Islands as well as Japan, south to Australia and east to French Polynesia. Recently recorded in 2001 for the first time in the Mediterranean Sea off Israel, following an entry via the Suez Canal, it is now expanding northward in Levantine waters where it remains rare.

Like other reef fish with a pelagic larval phase, regional currents facilitate high levels of gene flow, which in turn create high genetic diversity among the species.

== Description ==
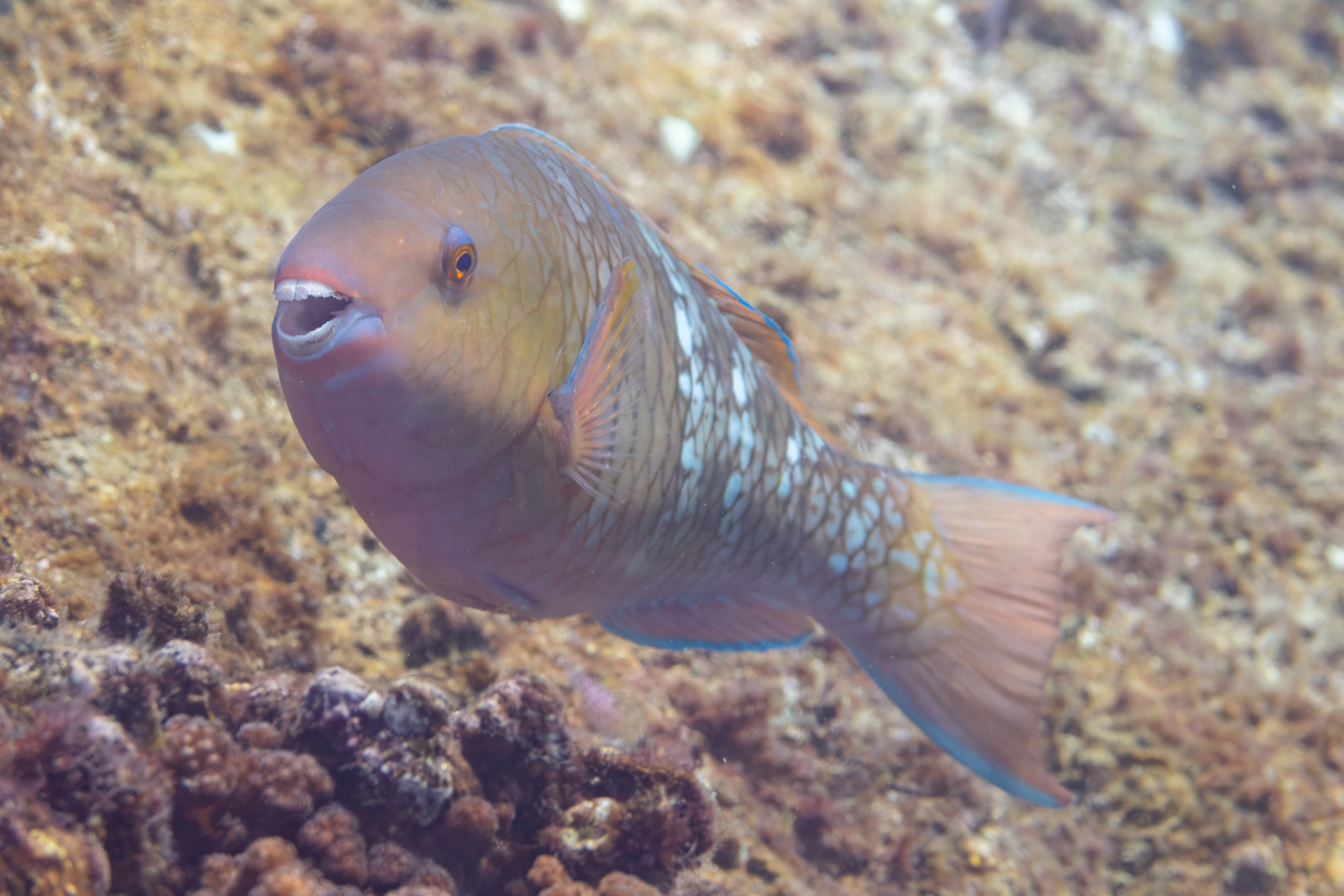
Close-up of the teeth

This species is blue-green to green in colour and commonly grows to approximately 46 cm. Its appearance is variable. It may have a central stripe on the dorsal and anal fins that is pink in color. The underside of the body may be pinkish or yellowish. There may be blue markings around the area of the pectoral fin.

== Habitat ==
Scarus ghobban occurs in places with sandy bottoms and in areas with seagrass. It is also known to live in marginal reefs and in deeper waters.

== Ecology ==
Scarus ghobban grows quickly and can live up to 13 years. It tends to congregate in small schools. Scarus ghobban can rotate their mandible bone at a high velocity; this allows them to function as a scraper and facilitate hydrological transport of fine sediments.

== Reproduction ==
The way Scarus ghobban reproduces is by the female laying eggs into the current of the water. After about 25 hours after the egg has been fertilized, it will hatch. After birth, the parrotfish will mature quickly and will not have to be near its parents for much time.

== Threats ==
While the species is captured in large numbers by fishermen for consumption and sale, and there is also a high amount of bycatch from other fisheries, it is not particularly targeted and appears not to be threatened at this point. As with other parrotfish, it is dependent on coral reefs to some degree and is likely to suffer from the continued degradation of those reefs.

== Gallery ==
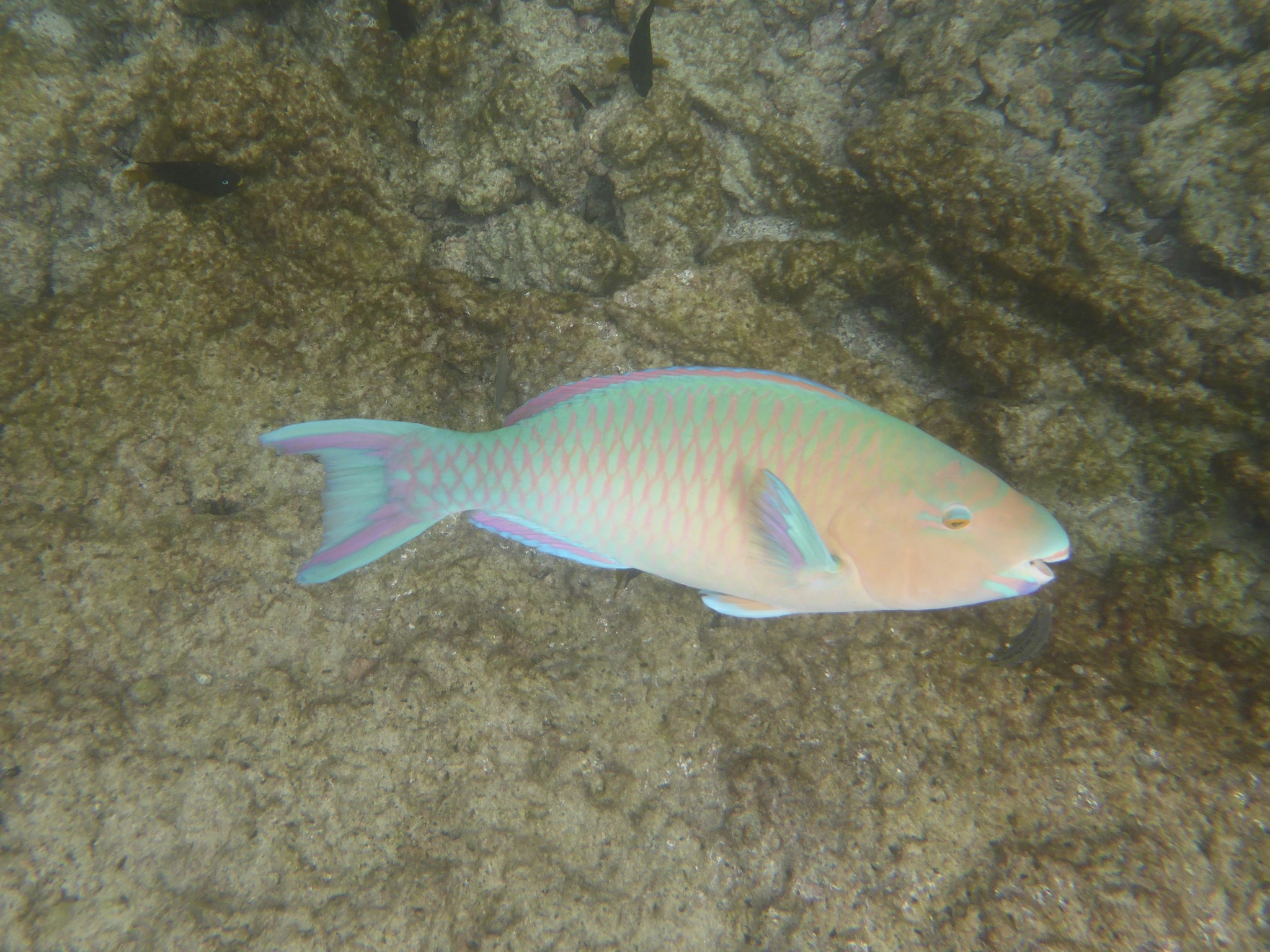
In the Galápagos

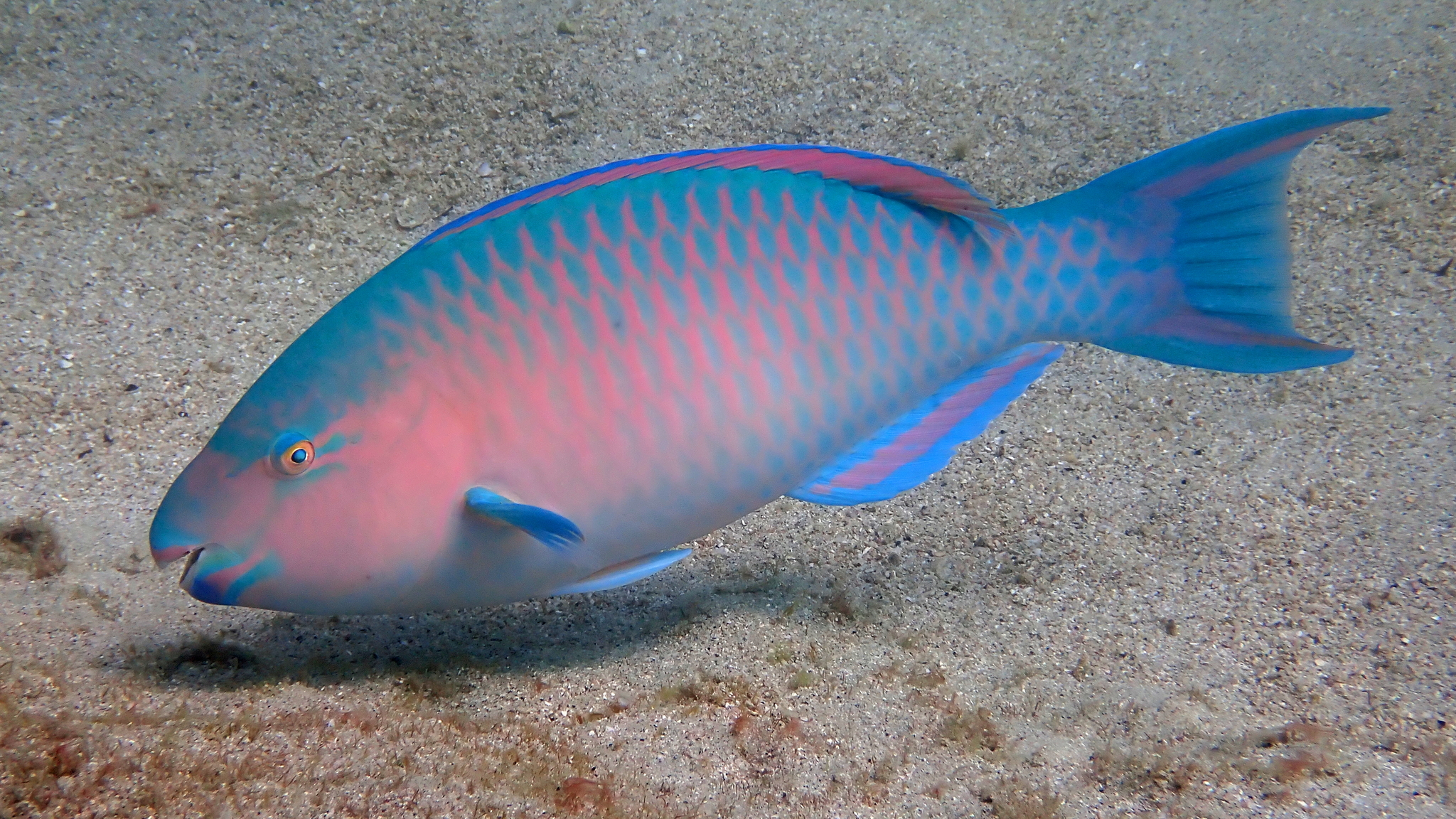
In Baja California
