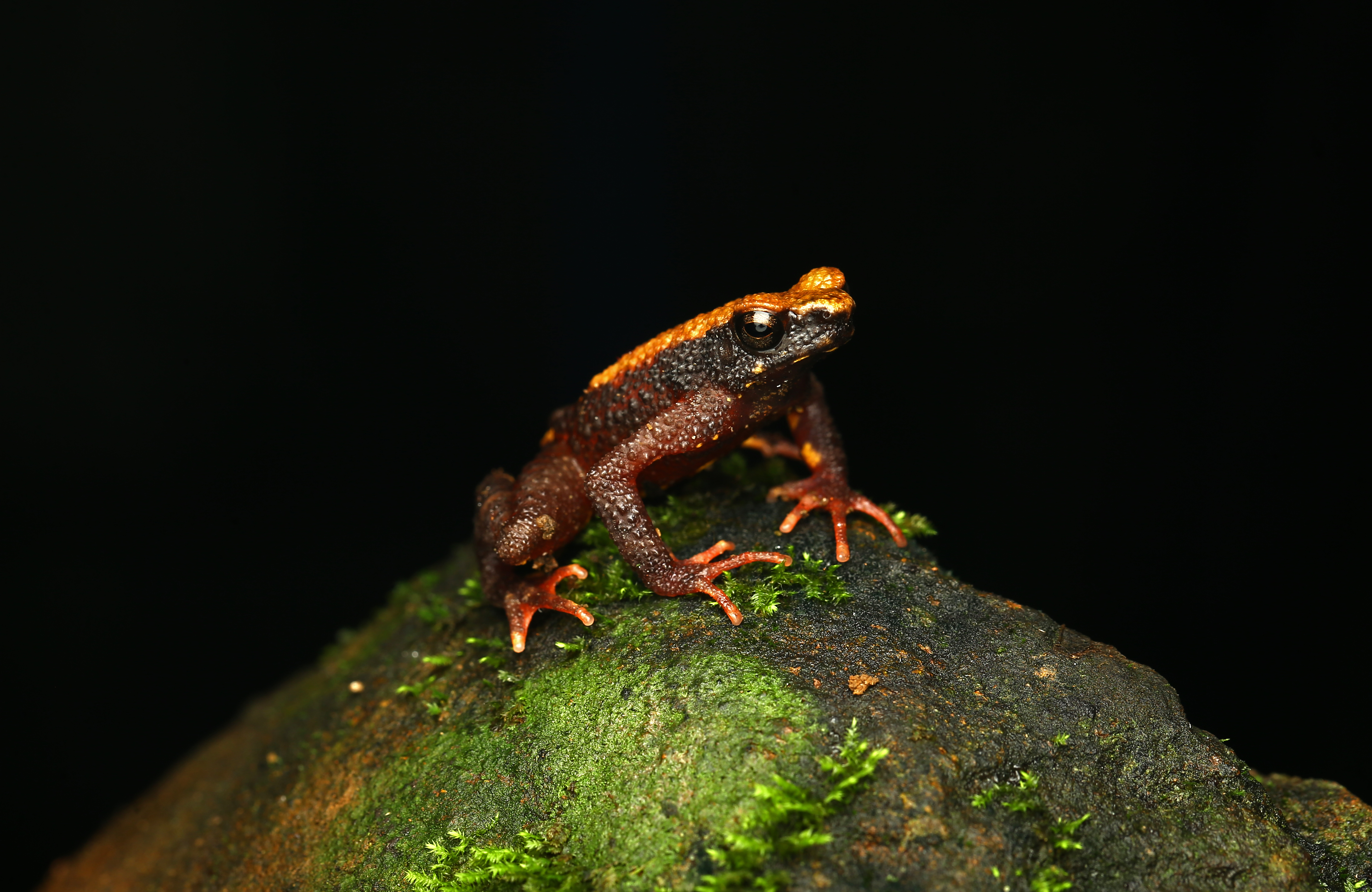

Conservation status
- Endangered (IUCN 3.1)

Scientific classification
- Kingdom: Animalia
- Phylum: Chordata
- Class: Amphibia
- Order: Anura
- Family: Bufonidae
- Genus: Blaira
- Species: B. ornata

Binomial name
- Blaira ornata (Günther, 1876)

Synonyms
- Ansonia ornata Günther, 1876; Bufo pulcher Boulenger, 1882; Ghatophryne ornata

= Blaira ornata =

Species of amphibian

Blaira ornata, known with common names ornate toad, Malabar torrent toad or black torrent toad, is a rare and endangered species of toad endemic to the Western Ghats. In 2009, this species along with A. rubigina was shifted from Ansonia to the genus Ghatophryne. The publication of the new genus however did not meet ICZN requirements and a new genus Blaira was created in 2021.

== Description ==
Habit slender. Crown without bony ridges; snout short, obliquely truncated, with angular canthus rostralis and vertical loreal region; interorbital space a little broader than the upper eyelid; tympanum distinct, about half the size of the eye. ringers rather slender, first much shorter than second; toes short, nearly entirely webbed; subarticular tubercles single, not very prominent; tips of fingers and toes slightly swollen; metatarsal tubercles two, not very prominent; no tarsal fold. The hind limb being carried forwards along the body, the tibio-tarsal articulation reaches to between the eye and the tip of the snout. Anterior half of the back finely tubercular, the remainder smooth; no parotoids. Black; upperside of head and a dorsal line generally grey; beneath with large bright yellow spots. Male with a subgular vocal sac. From snout to vent 1.2 inches. Brahmagiri Hills, Coorg. The toad lives in crevices among small rocks to large boulders in streams. Observed to be both active during day and night.

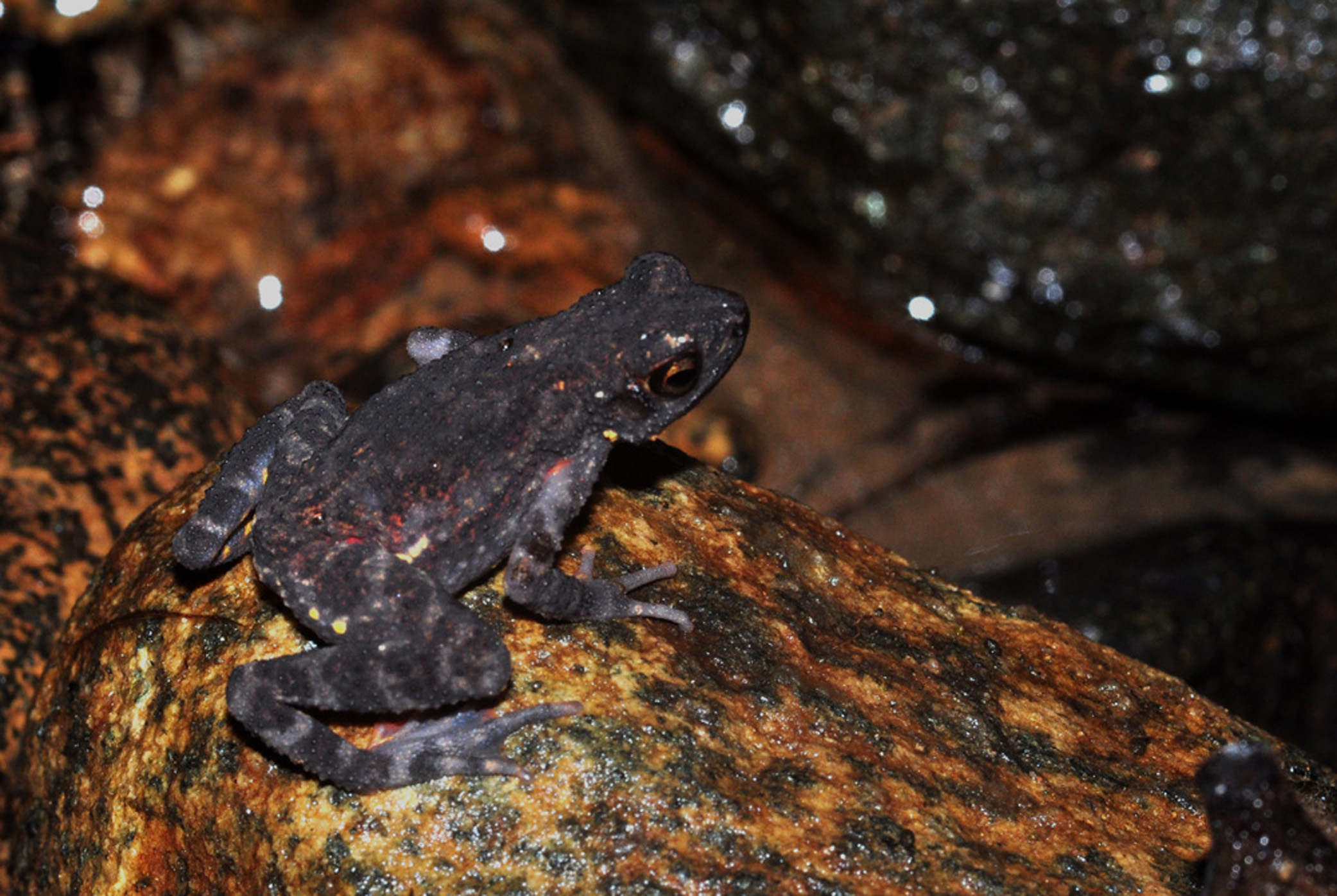
Malabar Torrent Toad

The skin of these toads is slightly rough and usually dry. The underbelly is usually held above the ground. Overall coloration on dorsum varies from dark brick red to black. Underside has bright red color with yellow circular spots. Base of mandible has two yellow spots. The bright coloration on the underside could be for unken reflex.

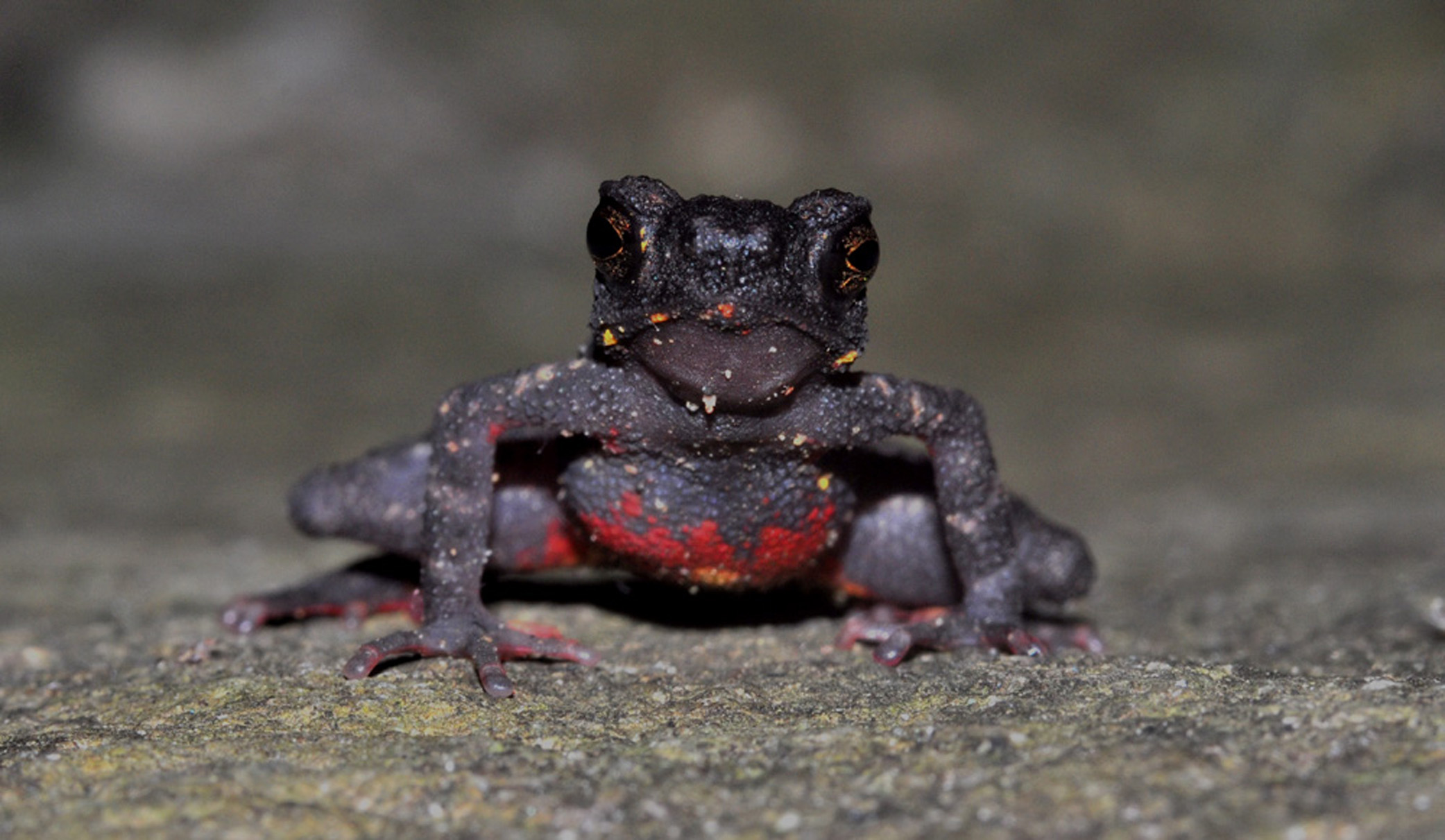
Front view and posture

It is known from the Western Ghats and the adjoining Nilgiris regions.
