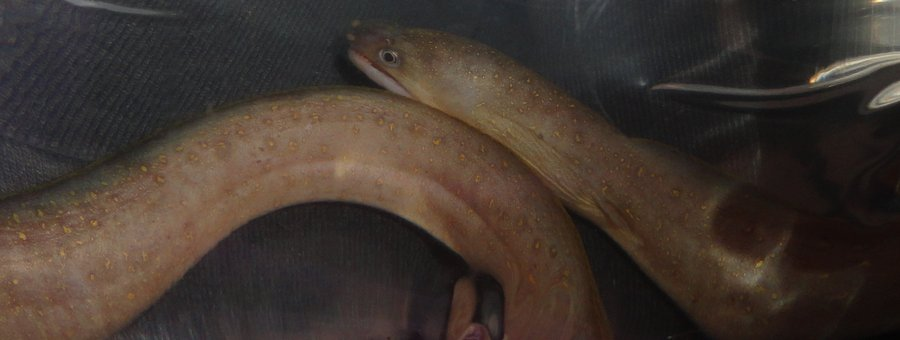

Conservation status
- Least Concern (IUCN 3.1)

Scientific classification
- Kingdom: Animalia
- Phylum: Chordata
- Class: Actinopterygii
- Order: Anguilliformes
- Family: Muraenidae
- Genus: Gymnothorax
- Species: G. tile

Binomial name
- Gymnothorax tile (Hamilton, 1822)

Synonyms
- List: Gymnothorax borneensis Bleeker, 1863; Lycodontis literata McClelland, 1844; Lycodontis tile Hamilton, 1822; Muraena gracilis Richardson, 1848; Muraena vermiculata Richardson, 1848; Muraenophis tile (Hamilton, 1822); Strophidon maculata McClelland, 1844; Strophidon punctata McClelland, 1844; Thyrsoidea microdon Kaup, 1856

= Indian mud moray eel =

Species of fish

The Indian mud moray eel (Gymnothorax tile) is a moray eel found in the western Pacific and Indian Oceans. It is also commonly known as the freshwater moray or freshwater snowflake eel.

== Etymology ==
Gymnothorax comes from the Ancient Greek γυμνός (gymno-), meaning 'naked', and θώραξ (thoraks), meaning 'breastplate, corslet'. The specific epithet tile is from the Bengali vernacular name for this species.

== Description ==
The Indian mud moray is estimated to reach a length of approximately 61 cm (24 in), and can live up to 30 years. The species is characterized by a gray-brown body covered in speckles that vary in color from golden yellow to white. Gymnothorax tile, like any other moray eel, possesses a second set of jaws, called the pharyngeal jaws, to swallow their prey. The Indian mud moray's eyesight is very poor, and instead of using vision, the species rather relies upon a keen sense of smell and vibrations in the water to detect prey or threats.

== Distribution and habitat ==
The Indian mud moray is known from the Indo-West Pacific, including India, the Andaman Islands, Indonesia, the Philippines, New Guinea and Australia. It occurs down to 10 m depth.

The wild habitat type of the Indian mud moray is marine neritic. It is most commonly found hidden in debris resting over a soft substrate of mud or sand. It is often found in estuaries but may also enter the lower portions of rivers. While the Indian mud moray typically lives in marine conditions, it travels to fresh water for breeding and spawning.

When kept as pets, Indian mud morays thrive better in brackish water rather than pure fresh water, as the latter fresh water can cause these eels to reject their food and develop a variety of diseases that greatly shorten their life span. It is advisable to place a lid on the aquarium tank, as they have the ability to jump out.

== Diet ==
Indian mud morays are carnivorous and feed mainly on crustaceans and small fishes. They are, for the most part, a scavenger that may eat dead fish, shrimp, and other such foods. Due to their poor eyesight, Indian mud morays typically do not hunt on a normal basis, but will resort to hunting if there is no other option.

When kept in captivity, due to their tendency to reject food that is not to their liking, these eels can prove to be difficult to feed. Additionally, stress can cause them to starve themselves, resulting in death in severe cases.

== Threats ==
There are no major threats known to this species, although it may be impacted by coastal development, runoff and habitat degradation in some portions of its distribution.
