= Leptarma biju =

Scientific classification
- Kingdom: Animalia
- Phylum: Arthropoda
- Clade: Pancrustacea
- Class: Malacostraca
- Order: Decapoda
- Suborder: Pleocyemata
- Infraorder: Brachyura
- Family: Sesarmidae
- Genus: Leptarma
- Species: L. biju

Binomial name
- Leptarma biju Ng & Devi, 2020

Species of crab

Leptarma biju, commonly known as the tree-spider crab, is a species of crab endemic to the mangroves in Kerala, India. It is named for its unique root-climbing behavior. It has a pink, purplish, and reddish exterior.

== Description ==
Leptarma biju has a square-shaped carapace with yellow and purple patches, long walking legs with hook-like appendages. Additionally, it has large eyes that are positioned beyond its external orbital teeth, which allows it to get a better view of its surroundings. They are presumed to be nocturnal and climbs the roots of mangrove trees at low tide. Its purple, brick-red, and yellow coloration is thought to be an evolutionary form of camouflage that hides the crab from its predators. It is the first species of Leptarma that has been identified in India.

== Taxonomy ==
Leptarma biju was discovered in Kerala, India at the mouth of the Chittari River by carcinologists Dr. Suvarna S. Devi, from the Department of Aquatic Biology and Fisheries at the University of Kerala, and Professor Peter Ng, head of Lee Kong Chian Natural History Museum of Singapore in 2020. Investigators came across a few specimens of the species, climbing granite pylons under a bridge near a large patch of mangroves, and collected them for further analysis. Some hypothesize that this crustacean has successfully evaded discovery for so long due to its small size, nocturnal behavior, and camouflage coloration. Additionally, researchers have noted the many challenges and dangers that make exploring mangrove ecosystems at night difficult. L. biju received its scientific name in honor of the head of the Department of Aquatic Biology and Fisheries at the University of Kerala, Dr. Appukuttannair Biju Kumar, who is credited with the discovery.
