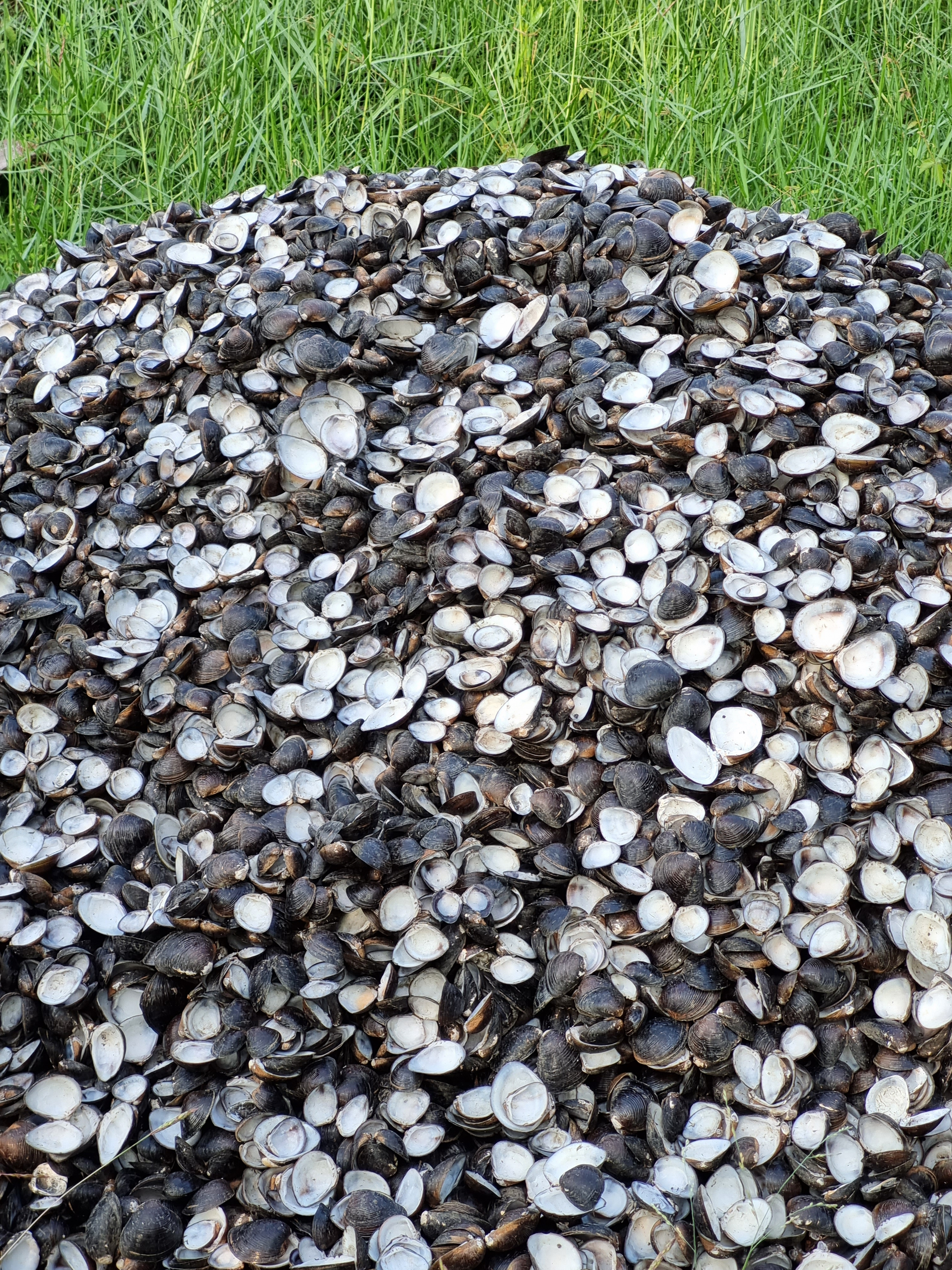
- Pile of black clams from Kerala, India

Conservation status
- Least Concern (IUCN 3.1)

Scientific classification
- Kingdom: Animalia
- Phylum: Mollusca
- Class: Bivalvia
- Order: Venerida
- Family: Cyrenidae
- Genus: Villorita
- Species: V. cyprinoides

Binomial name
- Villorita cyprinoides (Gray, 1825)

= Villorita cyprinoides =

Species of bivalve

Villorita cyprinoides, the black clam, is found in the backwaters of Kerala, mainly in Vembanad backwaters. This species occurs in salinity range of 3 ppt in August to 16 ppt in May and the dissolved oxygen content ranged from a high of 6.5 ml/L during August–November to a low of 2.83 ml/L in February. The black clam attains sexual maturity at a length of 11 to 15 mm (0.43 to 0.59 in). It does not show sex reversal or hermaphroditism. It spawns twice a year, from May to August, and from January to late March. A change in salinity is the most important factor that triggers spawning, while temperature is not a factor. The optimum salinity for spawning is about 10–12 ppt.

The species is harvested extensively from the wild population and this could be potential threat to this species. Other recorded threats are closure of the Thaneermukham Barrage near Vambanad Lake, frequent dredging, pollution from effluents from shrimp processing plants/factories, ecotourism and water hyacinth weed.

== Gallery ==
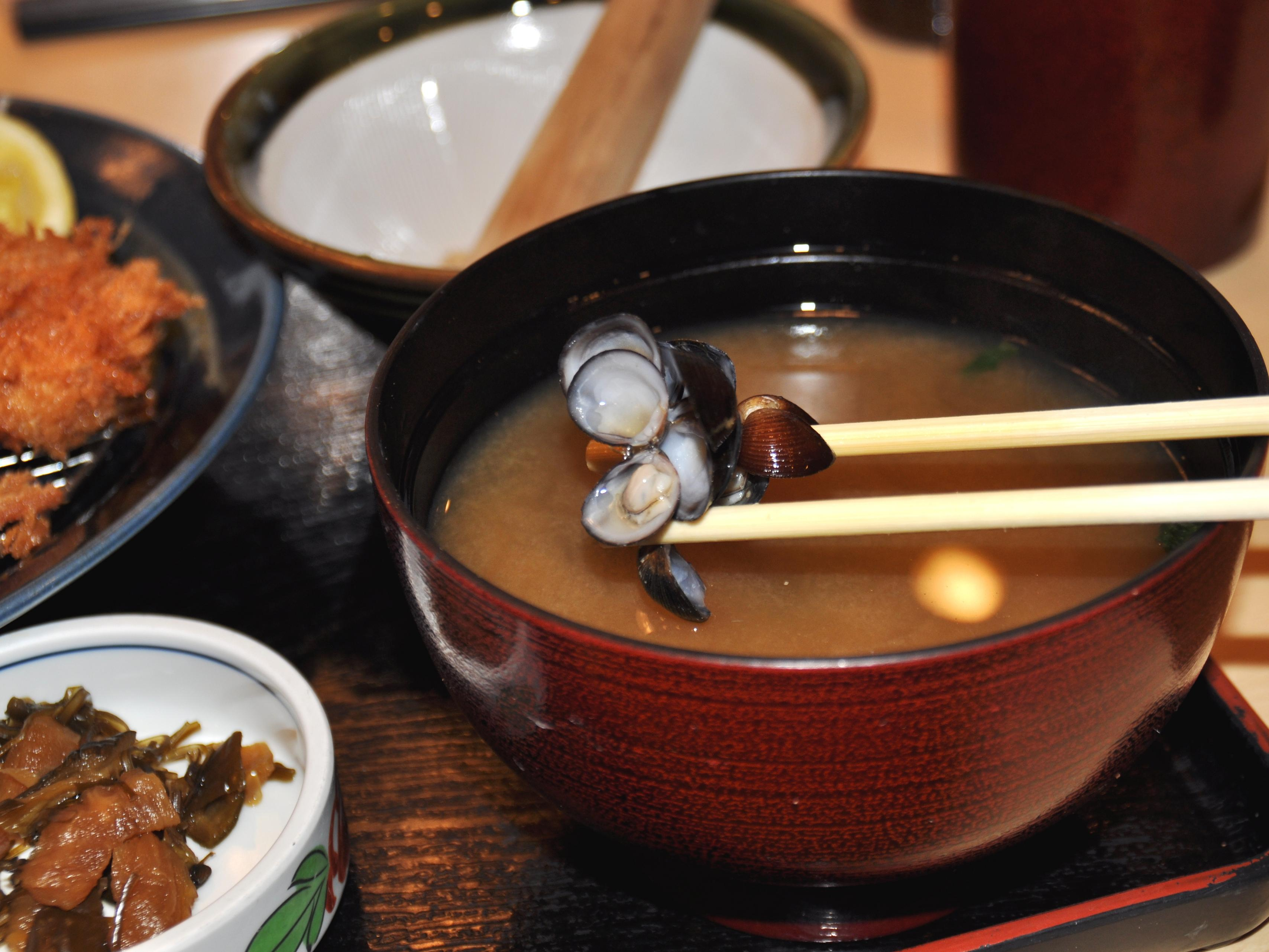
Black clam in miso soup

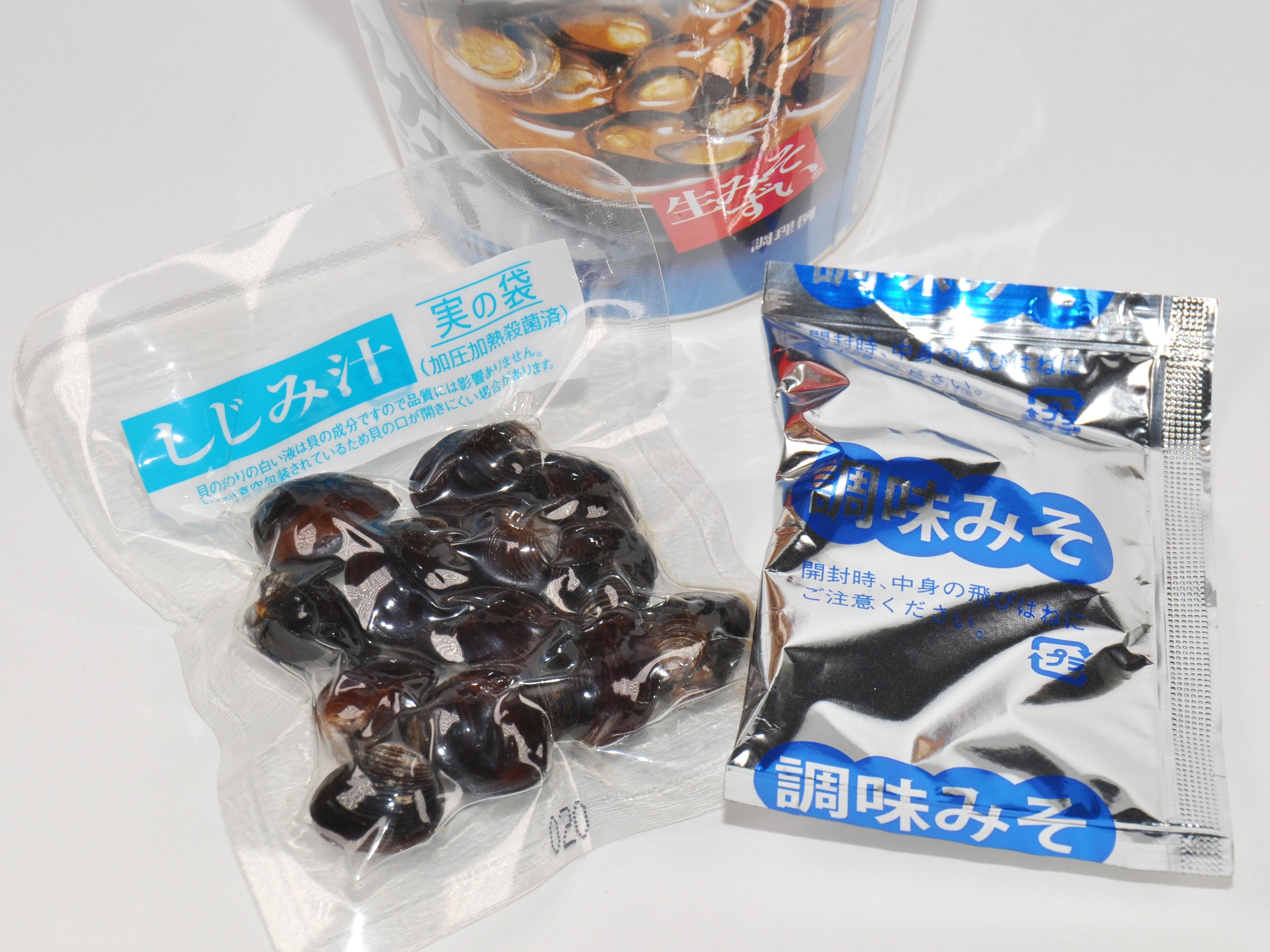
Black clams packaged for instant miso soup
