= List of fishes of Pakistan =

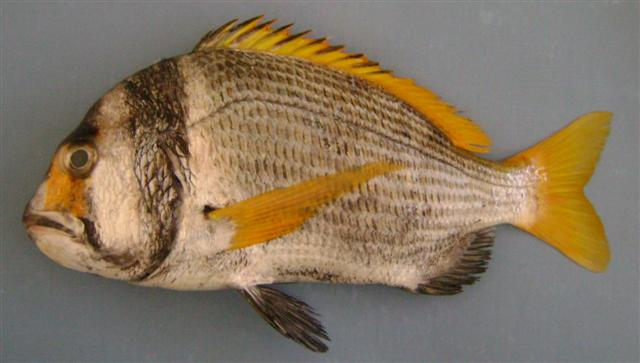
Acanthopagrus bifasciatus, Pakistan

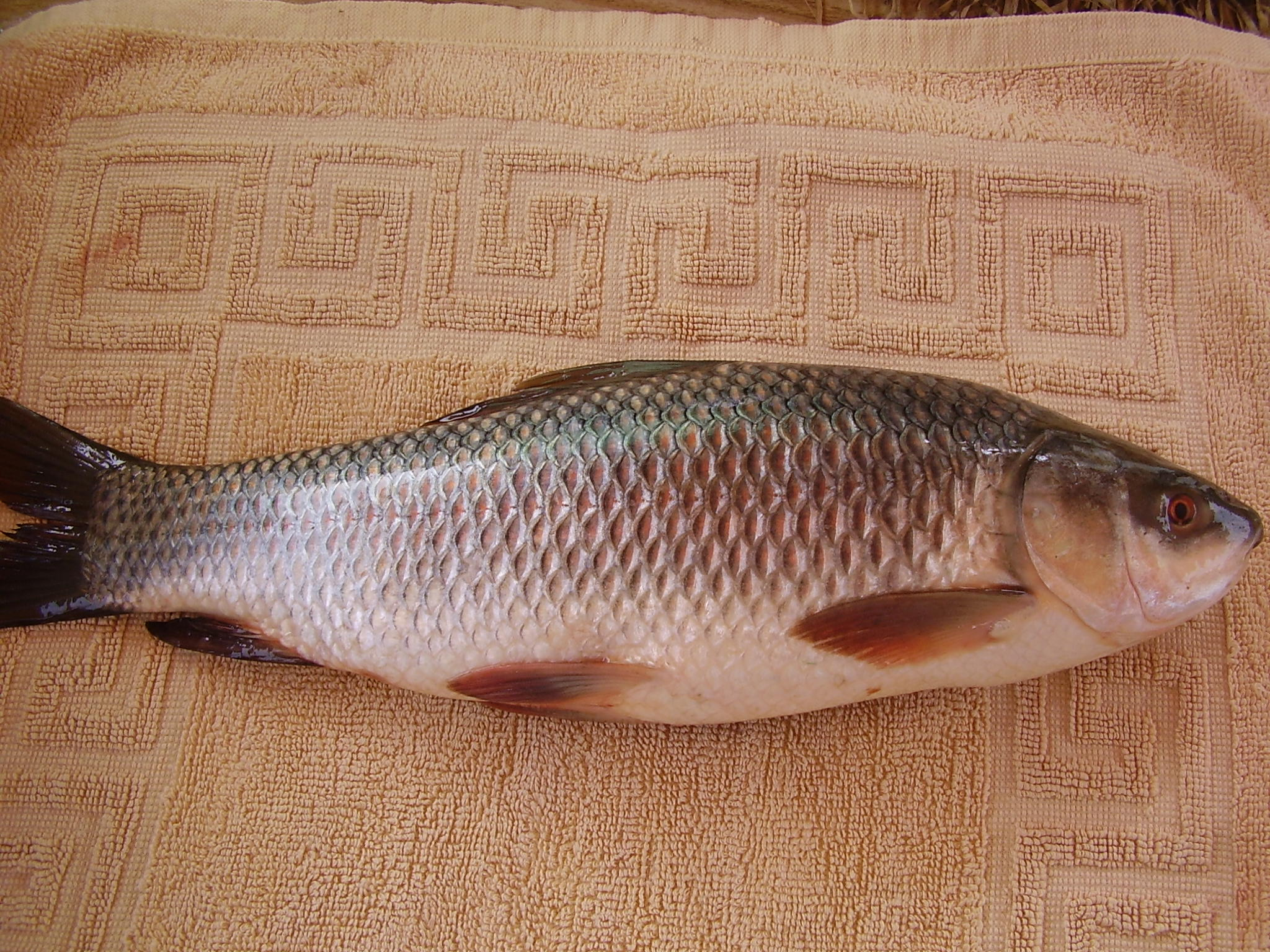
Rohu

There are 531 species of fishes in Pakistan, of these, 233 are freshwater fish. The mahseer is the national fish of Pakistan.

- Diptychus maculatus - scaly osman (found only in Deosai)
- Naziritor zhobensis - Zhobi mahseer
- Notopterus chitala
- Notopterus notopterus - bronze featherback
- Ptychobarbus conirostris (found only in Deosai)
- Triplophysa stoliczkai - Tibetan stone loach (found only in Deosai)

== Family Cyprinidae ==
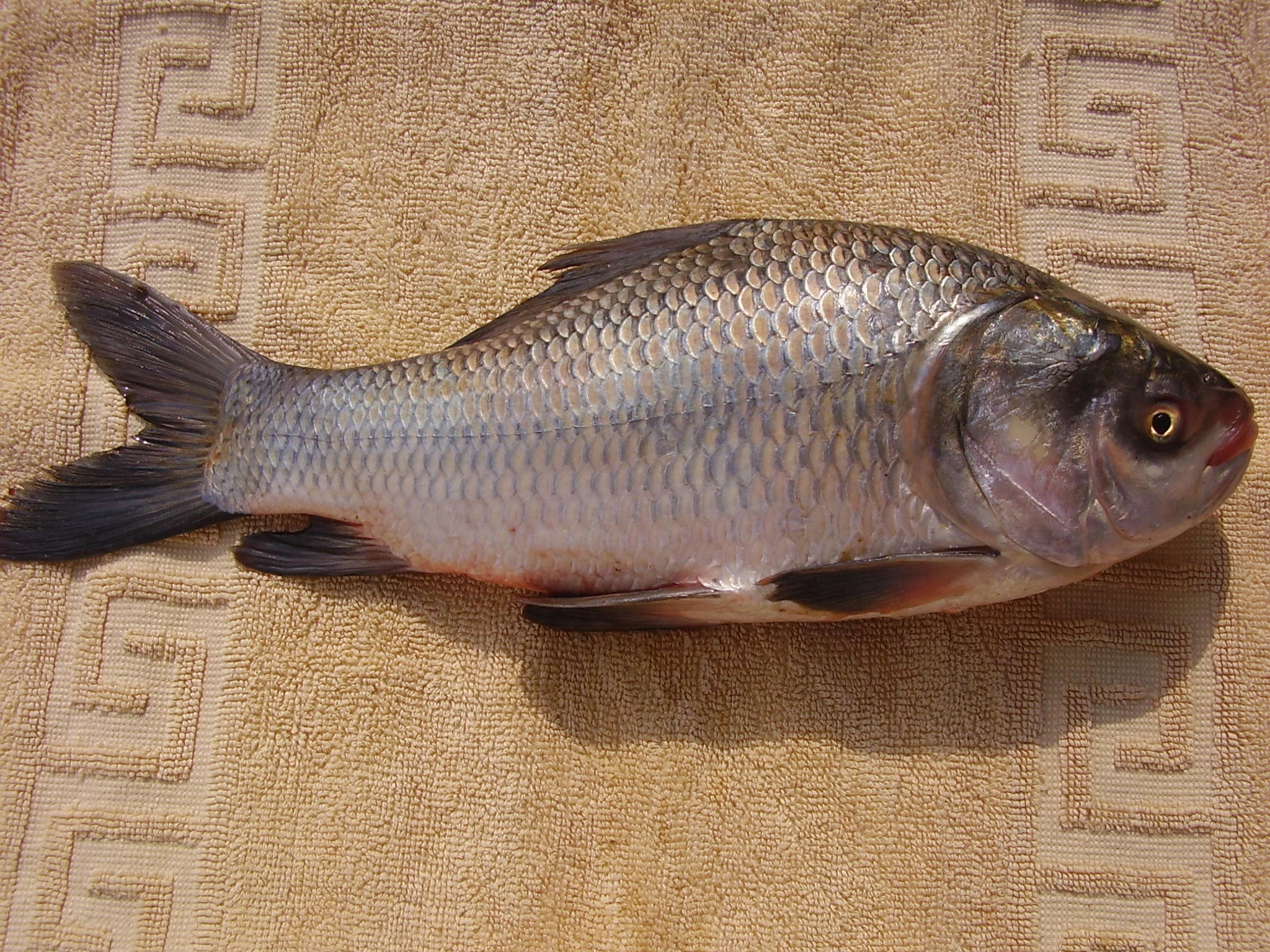
Thela fish

- Catla catla - thela/theri fish
- Labeo calbasu - dahi/orangefin labio
- Labeo rohita - rohu
- Tor putitora - golden mahasher, the national fish of Pakistan

== Family Clupeidae ==
- Gudusia chapra
- Tenualosa ilisha - ilish

== Family Chandidae ==
- Channa gachua
- Channa marulius
- Channa punctata
- Channa striata

== Spiny-rayed fishes ==
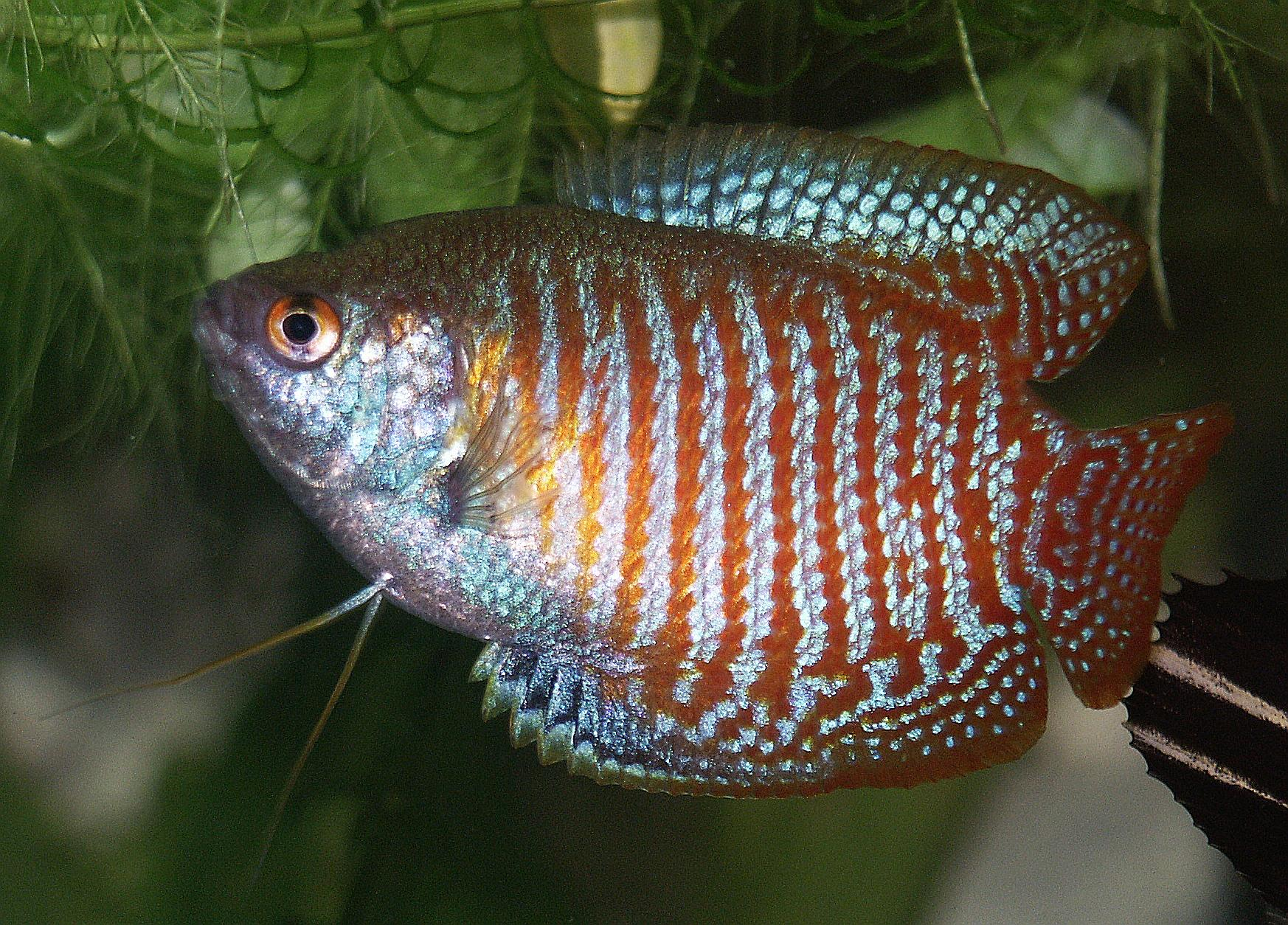
Gourami

- Badis badis
- Colisa lalia - dwarf gourami
- Chanda baculis
- Chanda nama - elongate glassy perchlet
- Chanda ranga - Indian glassy perch
- Colisa fasciata
- Glossogobius giuris - tank goby
- Nandus nandus
- Oreochromis mossambicus - Mozambique tilapia
- Sicamugil cascasia - yellowtail millet

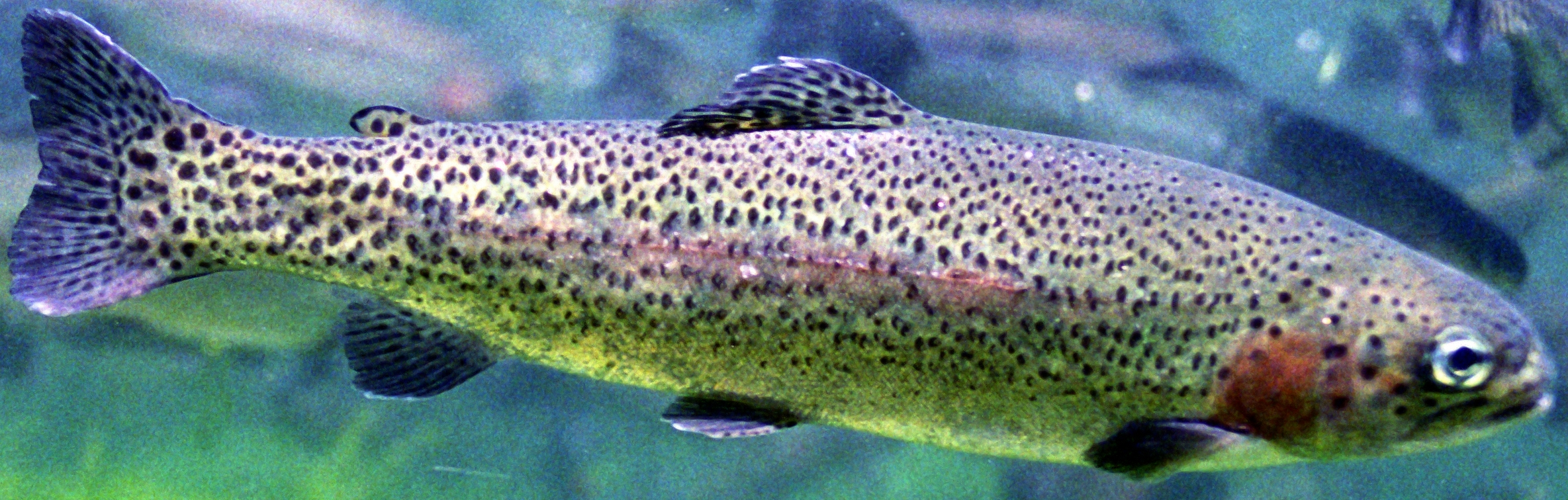
Rainbow trout

== Exotic species ==
- Ctenopharyngodon idella - grass carp
- Cyprinus carpio - common carp
- Hypophthalmichthys molitrix - silver carp
- Hypophthalmichthys nobilis - big head carp
- Maculabatis arabica - Arabic whipray
- Oncorhynchus mykiss - rainbow trout
- Salmo trutta - brown trout
- Chinese carps
