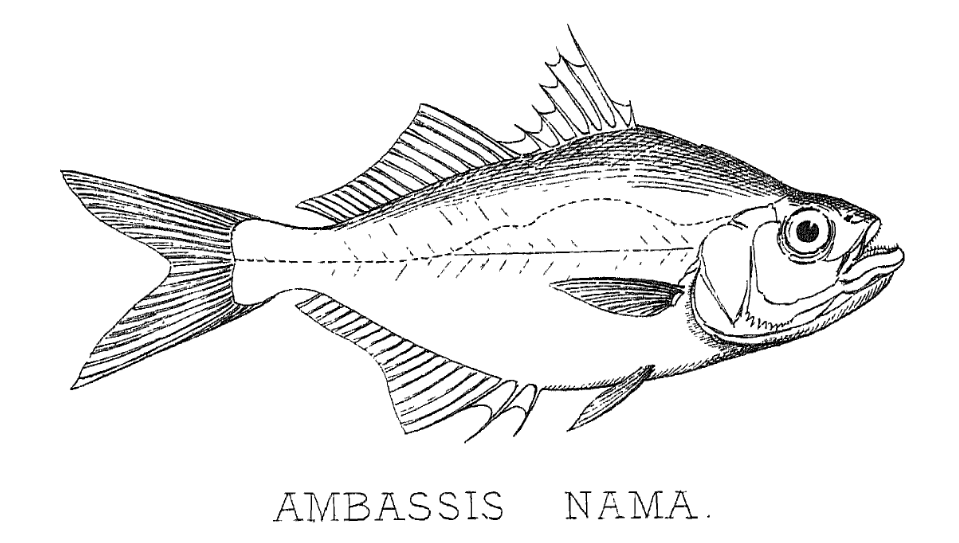
- Chanda nama

Scientific classification
- Kingdom: Animalia
- Phylum: Chordata
- Class: Actinopterygii
- Order: Mugiliformes
- Family: Ambassidae
- Genus: Chanda; Hamilton, 1822

Synonyms
- Bogoda Bleeker, 1853; Hamiltonia Swainson, 1839

= Chanda (fish) =

Genus of fishes

Chanda is a genus of fish in the family Ambassidae, the Asiatic glassfishes. The name is an allusion to the local name for glassfishes in India, though this common name is used across several genera. Before recent expansion, the genus was formerly monotypic including only C. nama, and both species and genus were first described by Francis Buchanan-Hamilton in 1822.

== Species ==
The Catalog of Fishes lists 13 species:

- Chanda alleni (Datta & Chaudhuri, 1993)
- Chanda baculis Hamilton, 1822 (Himalayan glassy perchlet)
- Chanda bistigmata (Geetakumari, 2012)
- Chanda nama Hamilton, 1822 (Elongate glassy perchlet)
- Chanda notata (Blyth, 1860)
- Chanda pulcinella (Kottelat, 2003) (Humphead glassy perchlet)
- Chanda ranga Hamilton, 1822 (Indian glassy perchlet)
- Chanda robertsi (Datta & Chaudhuri, 1993)
- Chanda serrata (Dishma & Vishwanath, 2015)
- Chanda siamensis Fowler, 1937 (Indochinese glassy perchlet)
- Chanda tenasserimensis (Roberts, 1995)
- Chanda vollmeri (Roberts, 1995)
- Chanda waikhomi (Geetakumari & Basudha, 2012)

Synonyms

- Chanda lala Hamilton, 1822 valid as Pseudambassis lala (Hamilton, 1822)
