= Denariusa australis =

Conservation status
- Least Concern (IUCN 3.1)

Scientific classification
- Kingdom: Animalia
- Phylum: Chordata
- Class: Actinopterygii
- Division: Teleostei
- Order: Mugiliformes
- Family: Ambassidae
- Genus: Denariusa; Whitley, 1948
- Species: D. australis

Binomial name
- Denariusa australis (Steindachner, 1867)

Synonyms
- Apogon australis Steindachner, 1867

Species of ray-finned fish

Denariusa australis, known commonly as the pennyfish, is a species of ray-finned fish in the family Ambassidae, the Asiatic glassfishes. It is native to Papua New Guinea and Australia. This species grows to a length of 4.5 centimetres (1.8 in) SL.
