= Chanda robertsi =

Conservation status
- Data Deficient (IUCN 3.1)

Scientific classification
- Kingdom: Animalia
- Phylum: Chordata
- Class: Actinopterygii
- Order: Mugiliformes
- Family: Ambassidae
- Genus: Chanda; Bleeker, 1874
- Species: C. robertsi

Binomial name
- Chanda robertsi Datta & Chaudhuri, 1993

Synonyms
- Parambassis robertsi (Datta & Chaudhuri, 1993); Pseudambassis roberti Datta & Chaudhuri, 1993

Species of ray-finned fish

Chanda robertsi is a species of ray-finned fish in the family Ambassidae, the Asiatic glassfishes. It was the sole species in the genus Pseudambassis. It is endemic to Burma. The Catalog of Fishes classified this species as Parambassis robertsi between 2012 and 2024, but now classifies it as Chanda. The specific name honours the American ichthyologist Tyson R. Roberts but the specific name was misspelt as "roberti" throughout the initial description.
