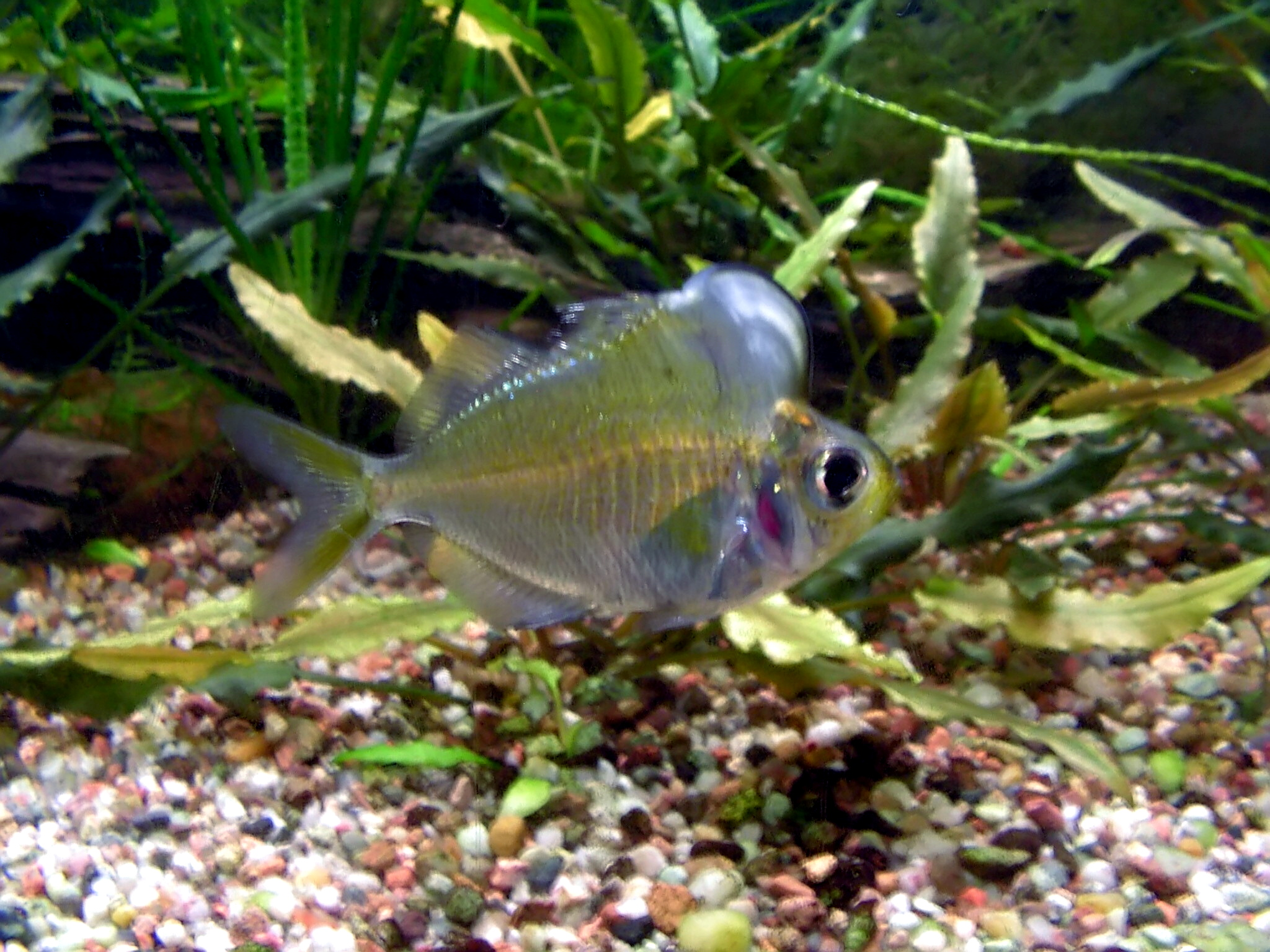

Conservation status
- Data Deficient (IUCN 3.1)

Scientific classification
- Kingdom: Animalia
- Phylum: Chordata
- Class: Actinopterygii
- Order: Mugiliformes
- Family: Ambassidae
- Genus: Chanda
- Species: C. pulcinella

Binomial name
- Chanda pulcinella (Kottelat, 2003)

Synonyms
- Parambassis pulcinella Kottelat, 2003

= Chanda pulcinella =

Humphead glassfish

Species of ray-finned fish

Chanda pulcinella, the humphead glassfish or humphead perchlet, is a species of Asiatic glassfish native to fast-flowing streams in the Ataran basin (itself a part of the Salween basin) in southeast Myanmar and west Thailand. It reaches a length of 10 cm (3.9 in) and is sometimes seen in the aquarium trade.

== Etymology ==
The specific name alludes to Pulcinella, the humpback from the comedia dell'arte.

== Description ==
Like other glass perch, Chanda pulcinella is largely colorless and transparent.

It grows to 8 cm (3.1 in) in length and has a prominent hump in front of the first dorsal fin formed by a very long, thin outgrowth of the supraoccipital spine. The supraoccipital is a central, dorsal ossification on the occipital bone . The hump occurs in both sexes, but is larger in males.

Dorsal and anal fins have gray or black outer edges, the first dorsal fin and the anal fin each have a row of dots towards the body. Both lobes of the forked caudal fins have black stripes. At the base of the first dorsal fin is a small black spot from which a black stripe extends to the head.

The first dorsal fin is supported by seven fin spines, the second by a fin spine and seven soft rays. The anal fin has three spines and 16 to 17 soft rays. The number of vertebrae is 25. The area behind the dorsal fins is scaleless.

The humphead glassfish lives in large clear-water rivers, especially near waterfalls and large rapids. It is territorial.
