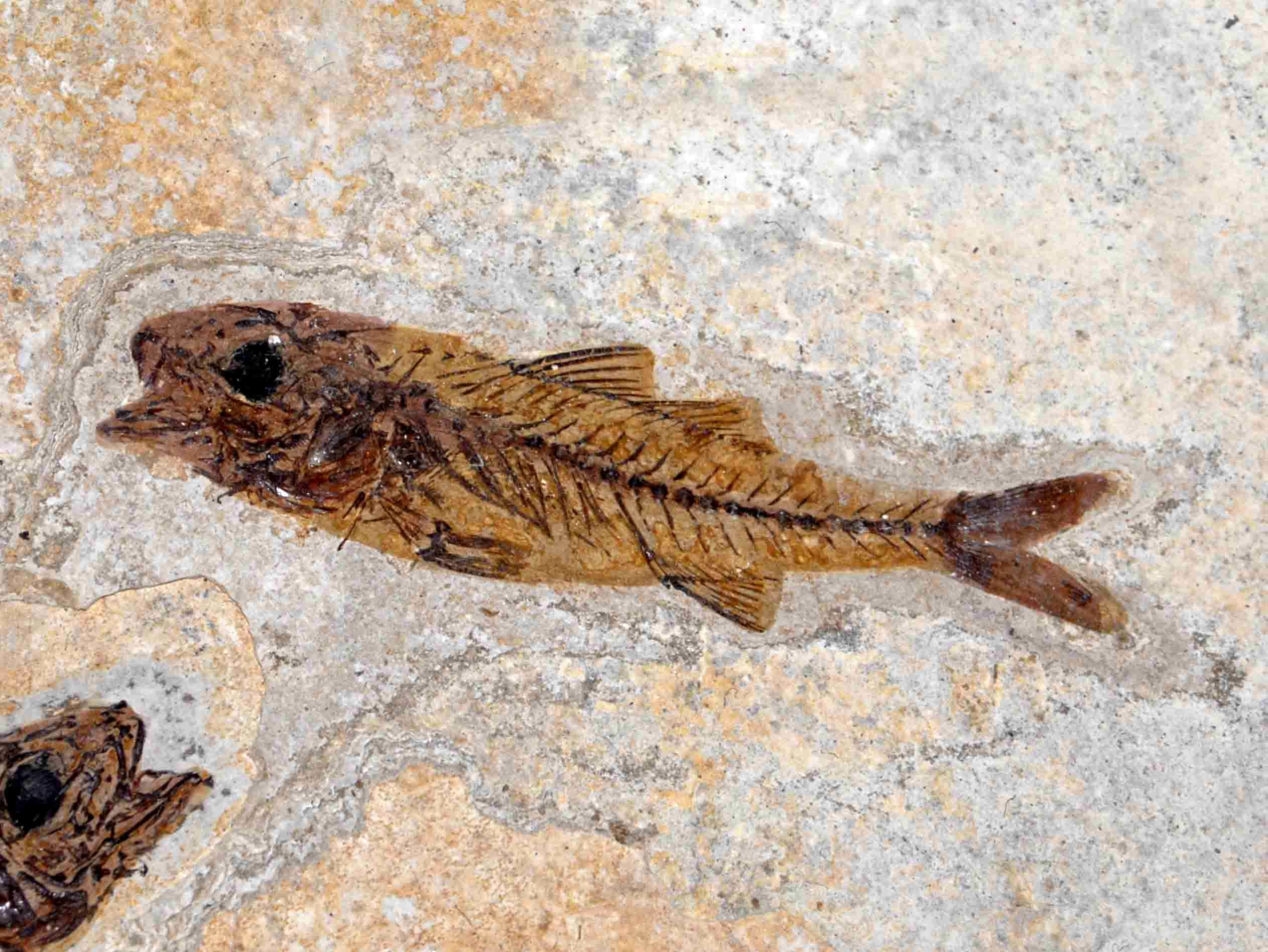
- Specimen of D. macrurus from France

Scientific classification
- Kingdom: Animalia
- Phylum: Chordata
- Class: Actinopterygii
- Division: Teleostei
- Order: Mugiliformes
- Family: Ambassidae
- Genus: †Dapalis; Gistl, 1848

Type species
- †Perca minuta de Blainville, 1818

Species
- See text

Synonyms
- †Smerdis Agassiz, 1833 (in part)

= Dapalis =

Dapalis Temporal range: Middle Eocene to Early Miocene

Extinct genus of fishes

Dapalis is an extinct genus of prehistoric glassfish known from the Middle Eocene to the Early Miocene. It is known from both freshwater and estuarine habitats of much of mainland Europe.

It is one of the oldest glassfishes known in the fossil record, and is thought to be a stem group member of the Ambassidae as it appears to predate the most recent common ancestor of modern glassfish, which likely evolved in the early Cenozoic in freshwater habitats of Australia. Fossils are abundant throughout Europe, especially during the late Paleogene and early Neogene, in the form of both body fossils and otoliths.

== Distribution ==
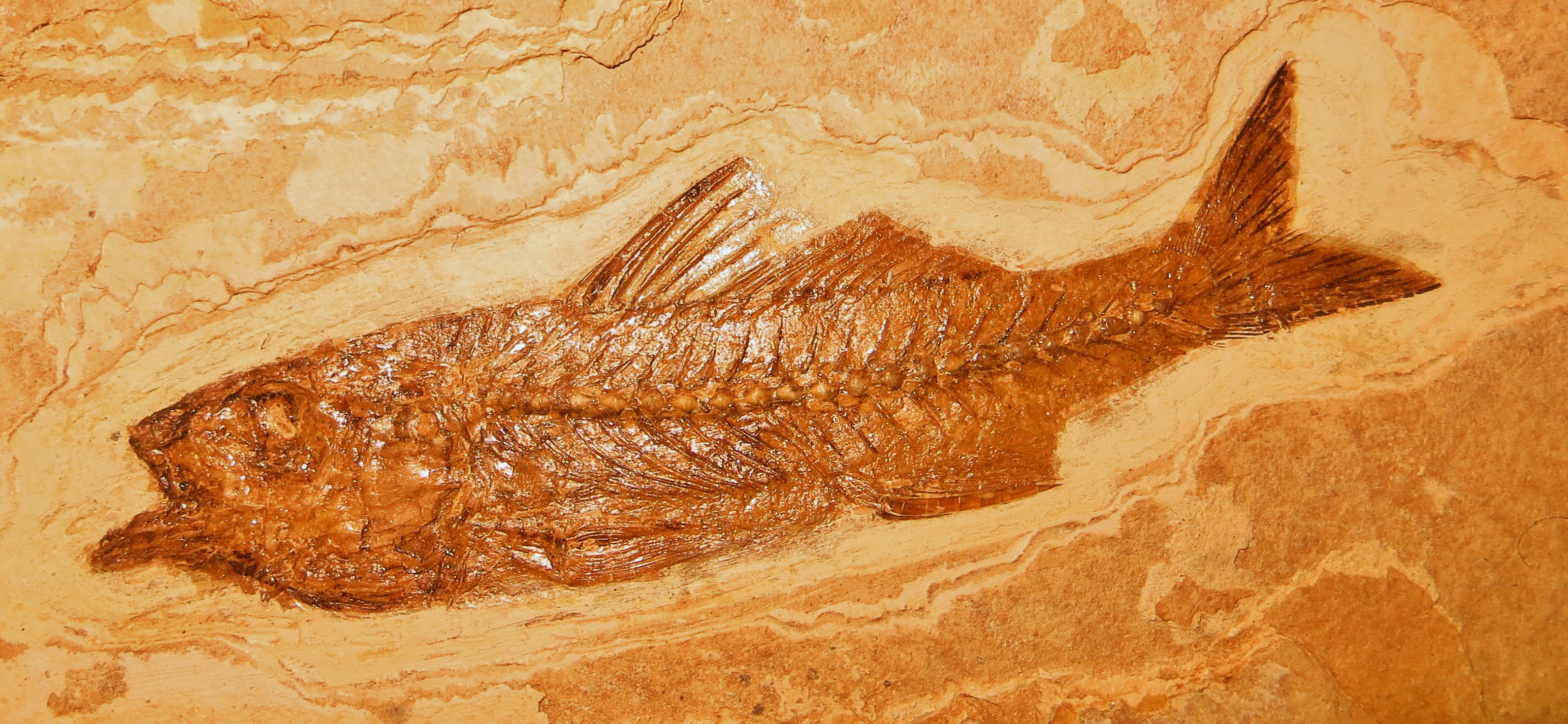
Specimen of D. macrurus

Dapalis was a common fish in estuarine and freshwater habitats of Europe from the mid-Paleogene to the early Neogene. When early marine ambassids first arrived to Europe in the Eocene, it would have been an island archipelago with the few freshwater habitats being restricted to these islands. Dapalis, as with several other early freshwater fish from Cenozoic Europe, descends from marine ancestors that colonized estuarine and eventually freshwater habitats.

Dapalis is the second most common fossil fish of the Aix-en-Provence lagerstatte in France, where large numbers of articulated specimens are known. A specific site dating to the latest Oligocene has extremely abundant fossils of an indeterminate Dapalis species that replaces the D. minutus of slightly earlier sites in the same region. A roadcut near Avignon has another exposure of the Aix-en-Provence formation, with extremely abundant D. minutus and another undescribed species, to the extent that a nearby blind alley is nicknamed the "Impasse des Dapalis".

A highly speciose assemblage of freshwater Dapalis is known from the Early Oligocene of Serbia, comprising at least 5 species known from articulated specimens with in-situ otoliths. This marks the most diverse assemblage of freshwater Dapalis and the most diverse fossil assemblage of Dapalis containing both otoliths and articulated skeletons. This group appears to have inhabited an isolated freshwater habitat and is highly morphologically distinct from other European Dapalis species, suggesting that they were either highly adapted to this environment or represented a unique lineage of Dapalis that arrived to Europe independently of other lineages.

Some fossil otoliths of Dapalis are abundant enough to be regional index fossils, with Dapalis formosus, an abundant species of the western Paratethys Sea, indicating the regional Ottnangian stage of the Miocene for example.

== Species ==
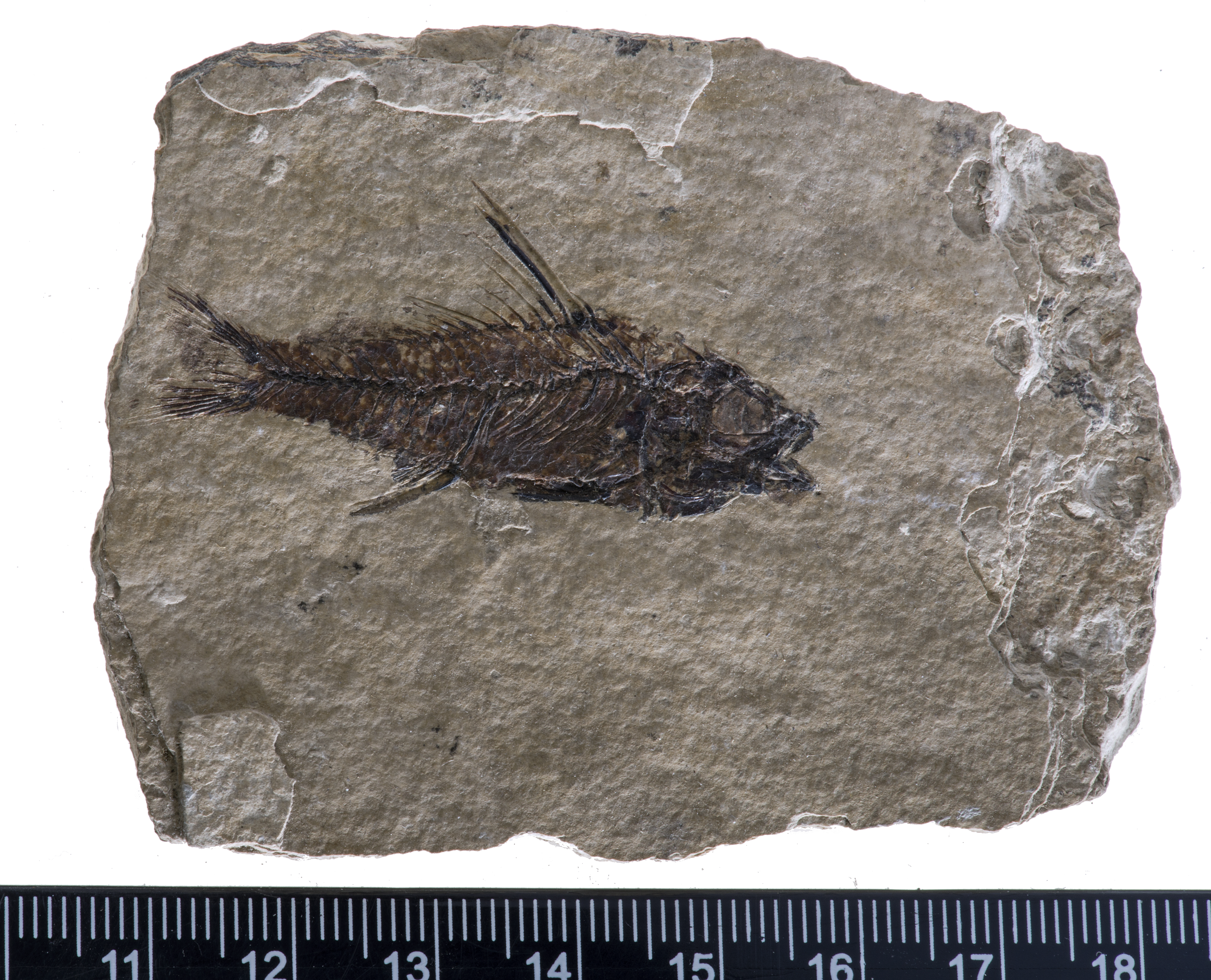
Specimen of D. minutus

The following species are known from both body fossils & otoliths. Many were initially classified in the preoccupied genus Smerdis, which was described based on an unrelated centropomid but included the earlier-described species D. minutus as the type species. Other species once classified in Smerdis likely do not belong to this genus.

Primarily based on Ahnelt & Bradić-Milinović (2024):

- D. absconditus Ahnelt & Bradić-Milinović, 2024 - Early Oligocene of Serbia [fossil specimens, otoliths]
- D. angustus Reichenbacher & Weidmann 1992 - Early Oligocene of France, Switzerland & Romania [otoliths]
- D. bradicae Schwarzhans et al., 2026 - Late Oligocene of Germany [Otolith]
- D. borkensis (Weiler, 1961) - Early Oligocene of Germany [otolith]
- D. carinatus Stinton & Kissling 1968 - Late Oligocene/Early Miocene (Chattian/Aquitanian) of France & Germany [otoliths]
- D. crassirostris (Rzehak, 1893) - Burdigalian of Germany [otolith]
- D. curvirostris (Rzehak 1893) - Burdigalian of Germany & the Czech Republic [otolith]
- D. formosus (von Meyer, 1848) - early Miocene of Switzerland, Germany, and possibly the Czech Republic [fossil specimens, otoliths]
- D. hungaricus (Schubert, 1912) - Middle Eocene (Lutetian) of Hungary [otolith]
- D. kaelini Reichenbacher, 1993 - Early Miocene of Germany [otolith]
- D. kuehni (Weinfurther, 1967) - Middle Miocene of Austria [otolith]
- D. macrurus (Agassiz ex Oken 1835) - late Oligocene of France (Campagne-Calavon Formation) & Bulgaria [fossil specimens, otoliths]
- D. minutus (de Blainville, 1818) (type species) - late Oligocene of France (Aix-en-Provence Formation) (type species) [fossil specimens, otoliths]
- D. octospinus Ahnelt & Bradić-Milinović, 2024 - Early Oligocene of Serbia [fossil specimens, otoliths]
- D. pauciserratus Ahnelt, Bradić-Milinović & Schwarzhans, 2024 - early Oligocene of Serbia [fossil specimen, otoliths]
- D. parvus Ahnelt & Bradić-Milinović, 2024 - Early Oligocene of Serbia [fossil specimens, otoliths]
- D. praecursor Gaudant, 2007 - Lutetian of France (Lutetian limestone) [fossil specimen, otoliths]
- D. quintus Ahnelt & Bradić-Milinović, 2024 - Early Oligocene of Serbia [fossil specimens, otoliths]
- D. rhenanus (Koken, 1891) - early Miocene of Germany [otolith]
- D. rhomboidalis Stinton & Kissling 1968 - middle Oligocene of Germany [otolith]
- D. transylvanicus Reichenbacher & Codrea, 1999 - Early Oligocene of Romania [otoliths]
- D. ventricosus Nolf & Reichenbacher, 1999 - Middle Eocene (Lutetian/Bartonian) of Italy [otolith]

The following species were originally classified in this genus but are not incorporated in later studies:

- D. bartensteini Malz 1978 - Early Miocene (Aquitanian) of Germany [otoliths]
- D. cappadocensi Menzel & Becker-Platen 1981 - Early Miocene (Aquitanian/Burdigalian) of Turkey [otoliths]
- D. distortus Nolf, 2003 - Late Cretaceous (Santonian) of Spain [otoliths]
- D. erici Nolf, Rana & Prasad, 2008 - Late Cretaceous (Maastrichtian) of India (Intertrappean Beds) [otoliths]

The former otolith-based species D. bhatiai and D. buffetauti from the Maastrichtian of India are now synonymized with one another and are thought to belong to the genus Anthracoperca. The species D. budensis is now placed in the percoid genus Oligoserranoides. Former species D. sandbergeri, D. rhoensis, and D. sieblosensis are now synonymized with one another and placed in the genus Dapaloides. Specimens of the former species Smerdis indica from Monte Bolca, Italy are now known to be of the percoid fish Cyclopoma. Fossil otoliths from New Zealand, placed in D. antipodus, are now tentatively placed in Ambassis.

== See also ==
- Prehistoric fish
- List of prehistoric bony fish
