= Denariusa =

Scientific classification
- Kingdom: Animalia
- Phylum: Chordata
- Class: Actinopterygii
- Division: Teleostei
- Order: Mugiliformes
- Family: Ambassidae
- Genus: Denariusa; Whitley, 1948

Type species
- Denariusa bandata Whitley, 1948

Genus of ray-finned fishes

Denariusa is a genus of ray-finned fish in the family Ambassidae, the Asiatic glassfishes. They are found in Australia and Papua New Guinea.

This genus includes fish commonly known as pennyfish. The genus name was derived from the Roman denarius coin, in a similar vein to Ambassis.

== Species ==
There are currently two recognized species in this genus:

- Denariusa australis (Steindachner, 1867)
- Denariusa bandata Whitley, 1948
