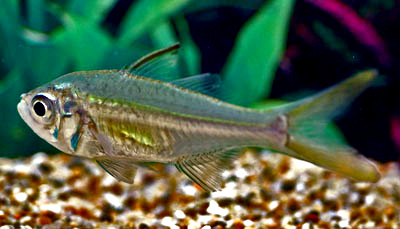

Conservation status
- Least Concern (IUCN 3.1)

Scientific classification
- Kingdom: Animalia
- Phylum: Chordata
- Class: Actinopterygii
- Order: Mugiliformes
- Family: Ambassidae
- Genus: Ambassis
- Species: A. miops

Binomial name
- Ambassis miops Günther, 1871

= Ambassis miops =

Species of ray-finned fish

Ambassis miops, commonly known as the flag-tailed glassfish, is a species of ray-finned fish in the family Ambassidae. It is widely distributed in the Indo-Pacific - Cook Islands, Fiji, French Polynesia, Indonesia, New Caledonia, Papua New Guinea, Philippines, Samoa, Solomon Islands, Timor-Leste and Vanuatu. It is found only in a few coastal sites along the North Queensland coast in Australia. A distinguishing feature of this species is a tiny spine is situated above the rear corner of the eye.
