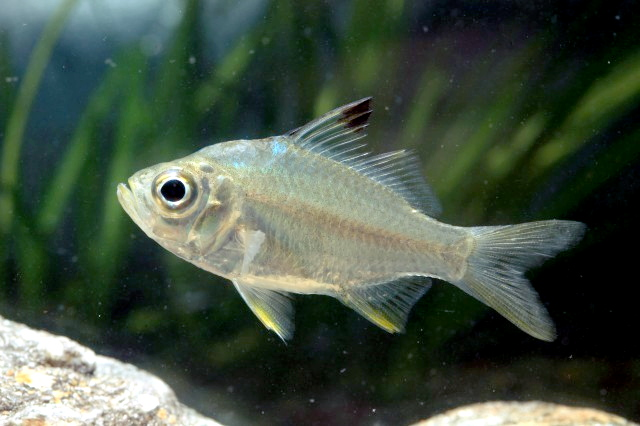

Conservation status
- Least Concern (IUCN 3.1)

Scientific classification
- Kingdom: Animalia
- Phylum: Chordata
- Class: Actinopterygii
- Order: Mugiliformes
- Family: Ambassidae
- Genus: Ambassis
- Species: A. nalua

Binomial name
- Ambassis nalua (Hamilton, 1822)

Synonyms
- Chanda nalua Hamilton, 1822

= Ambassis nalua =

Species of ray-finned fish

Ambassis nalua, the scalloped glassfish or scalloped perchlet, is a species of ray-finned fish in the genus Ambassis. It is native to the Indo-Pacific region, form India to Australia and New Guinea, where it occurs in bays, estuaries and mangrove-lined creeks.
