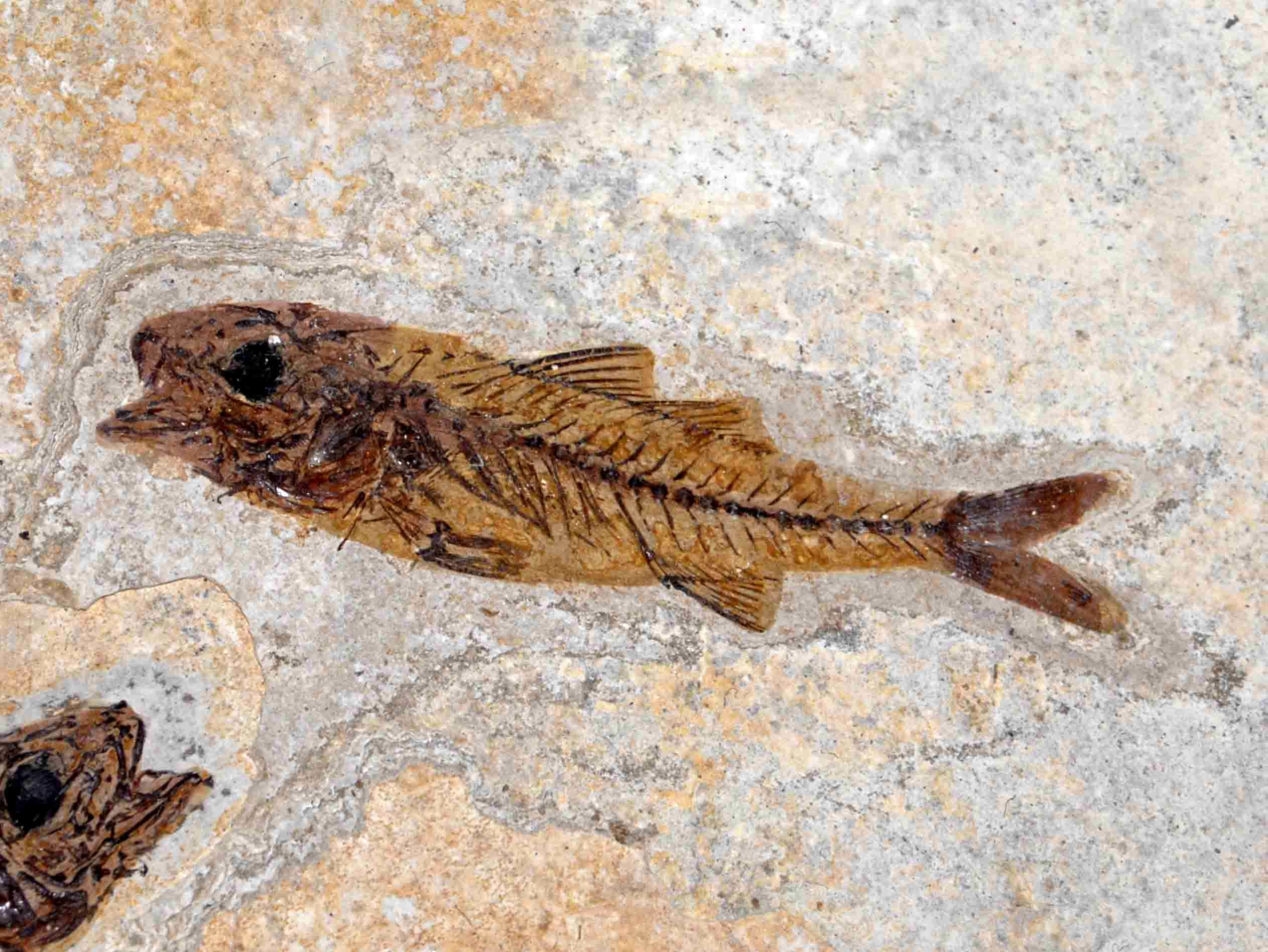
- Dapalis macrurus from Provence (France)

Scientific classification
- Kingdom: Animalia
- Phylum: Chordata
- Class: Actinopterygii
- Order: Mugiliformes
- Family: Ambassidae
- Genus: †Dapalis
- Species: †D. macrurus

Binomial name
- †Dapalis macrurus (Agassiz 1834)

= Dapalis macrurus =

Dapalis macrurus Temporal range: Early Oligocene

Extinct species of fish

Dapalis macrurus is an extinct species of prehistoric ray-finned fish. The only known site where it was found is the region around Céreste in the French Département Alpes-de-Haute-Provence, Provence-Alpes-Côte d’Azur, south-west France. Dapalis macrurus was common in some pits, together with plant-fossils and some other fish-remains. Size was between 3 and 20 cm

== Distribution ==
Fossils of this species have been found in the Oligocene of France.
