= Kokoda glass perchlet =

Conservation status
- Critically Endangered (IUCN 3.1)

Scientific classification
- Kingdom: Animalia
- Phylum: Chordata
- Class: Actinopterygii
- Order: Mugiliformes
- Family: Ambassidae
- Genus: Tetracentrum
- Species: T. caudovittatus

Binomial name
- Tetracentrum caudovittatus (Norman, 1935)

Synonyms
- Synechopterus caudovittatus Norman, 1935; Xenambassis simoni Schultz, 1945

Species of ray-finned fish

The Kokoda glass perchlet (Tetracentrum caudovittatus) is a species of ray-finned fish in the family Ambassidae. It is endemic to Papua New Guinea.
