= Parambassis apogonoides =

Conservation status
- Least Concern (IUCN 3.1)

Scientific classification
- Kingdom: Animalia
- Phylum: Chordata
- Class: Actinopterygii
- Order: Mugiliformes
- Family: Ambassidae
- Genus: Parambassis
- Species: P. apogonoides

Binomial name
- Parambassis apogonoides (Bleeker, 1851)

Synonyms
- Ambassis apogonoides Bleeker, 1851; Chanda apogonoides (Bleeker, 1851)

Species of ray-finned fish

Parambassis apogonoides, commonly known as the iridescent glassy perchlet, is a species of freshwater ray-finned fish from Southeast Asia.
