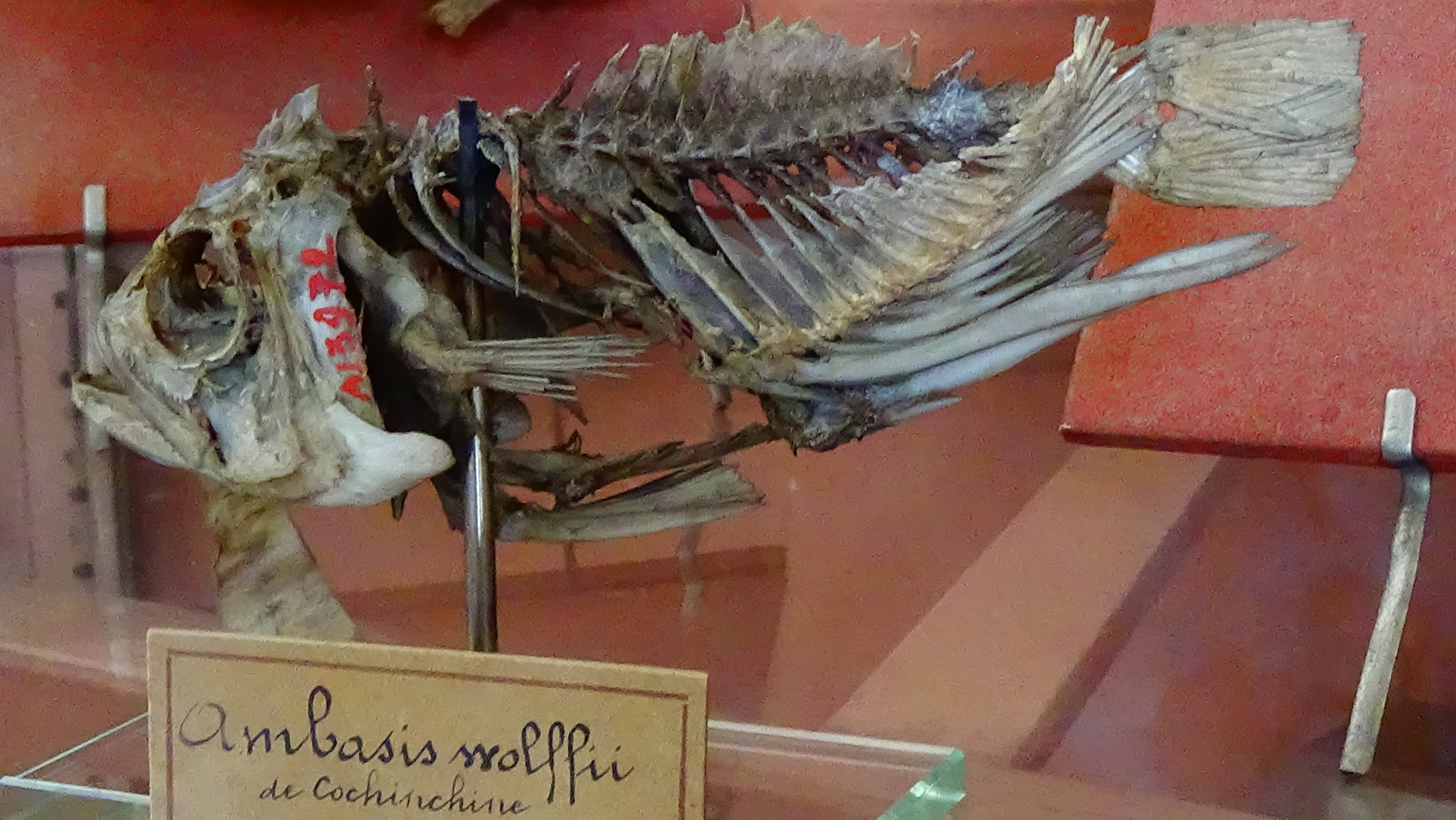
- mounted skeleton

Conservation status
- Least Concern (IUCN 3.1)

Scientific classification
- Kingdom: Animalia
- Phylum: Chordata
- Class: Actinopterygii
- Order: Mugiliformes
- Family: Ambassidae
- Genus: Parambassis
- Species: P. wolffii

Binomial name
- Parambassis wolffii (Bleeker, 1850)

= Parambassis wolffii =

Species of ray-finned fish

Parambassis wolffii, commonly known as the duskyfin glassy perchlet, is a species of freshwater ray-finned fish in the Asiatic glassfish family Ambassidae. It is native to Thailand and Indonesia. The specific name honours Bleeker's friend, the military surgeon Wolff.
