= Parambassis altipinnis =

High-finned glass perchlet

Conservation status
- Critically Endangered (IUCN 3.1)

Scientific classification
- Kingdom: Animalia
- Phylum: Chordata
- Class: Actinopterygii
- Order: Mugiliformes
- Family: Ambassidae
- Genus: Parambassis
- Species: P. altipinnis

Binomial name
- Parambassis altipinnis G. R. Allen, 1982

Species of ray-finned fish

Parambassis altipinnis, commonly known as the high-finned glass perchlet, is a species of ray-finned fish in the family Ambassidae. It is endemic to West Papua in Indonesia.
