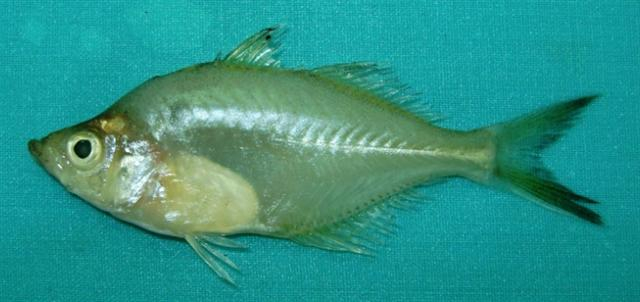

Conservation status
- Least Concern (IUCN 3.1)

Scientific classification
- Kingdom: Animalia
- Phylum: Chordata
- Class: Actinopterygii
- Order: Mugiliformes
- Family: Ambassidae
- Genus: Chanda; F. Hamilton, 1822
- Species: C. nama

Binomial name
- Chanda nama F. Hamilton, 1822

Synonyms
- Ambassis nama (Hamilton, 1822); Bogoda nama (Hamilton, 1822); Hamiltonia nama (Hamilton, 1822); Chanda bogoda Hamilton, 1822; Ambassis bogoda (Hamilton, 1822); Chanda phula Hamilton, 1822; Ambassis phula (Hamilton, 1822); Ambassis oblonga Cuvier, 1828; Equula ovata Swainson, 1839; Hamiltonia ovata (Swainson, 1839); Ambassis indica McClelland & Griffith, 1842

= Elongate glassy perchlet =

Species of ray-finned fish

The elongate glassy perchlet (Chanda nama) is a species of freshwater fish in the Asiatic glassfish family Ambassidae, the only species in the genus Chanda. It is native to an area of south Asia from Pakistan to Burma, in the Indomalayan realm.

The elongate glassy perchlet reaches a maximum total length of 11 centimetres (4.3 in).

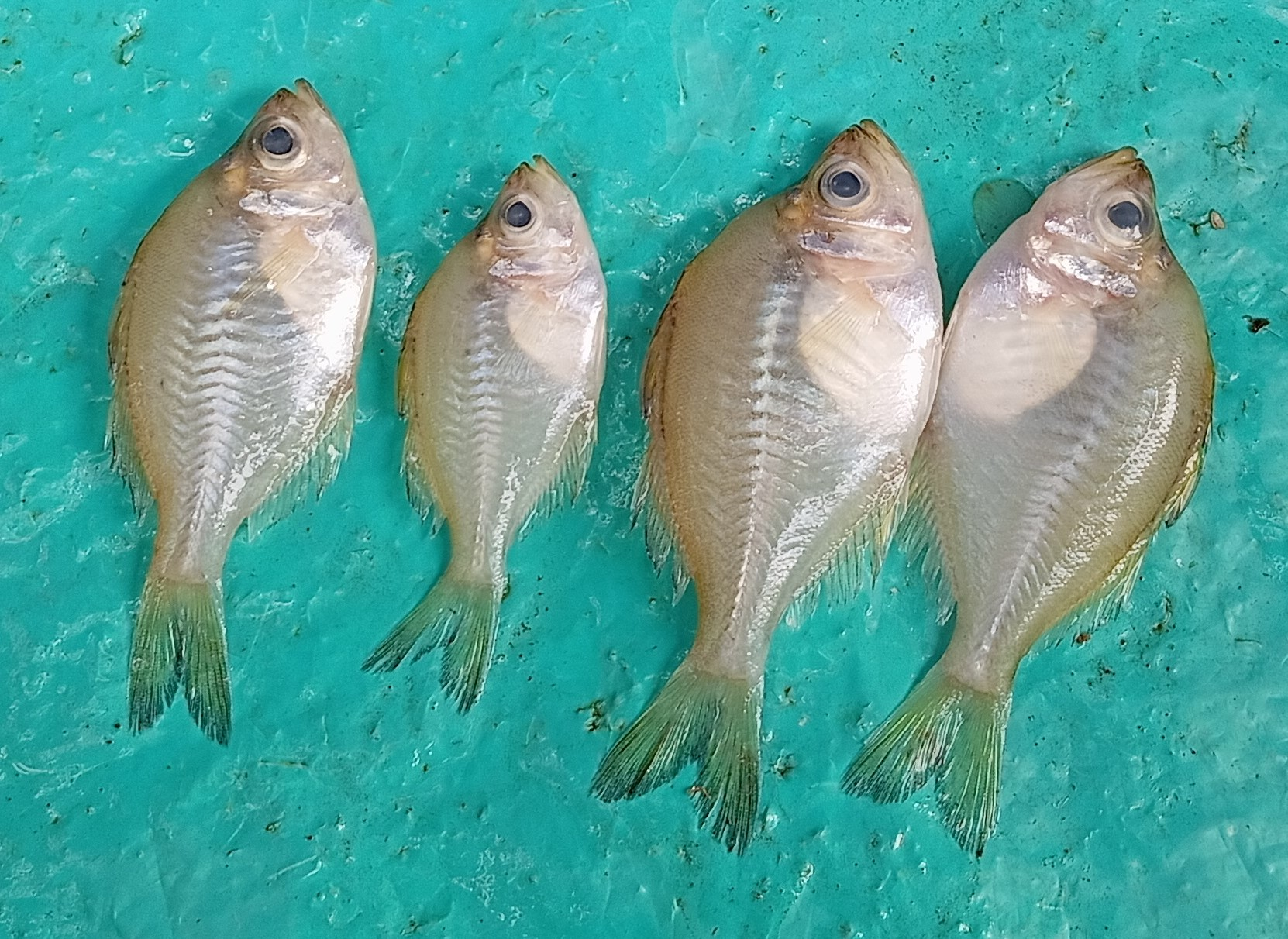
Elongate glassy perchlet, West Bengal, India

The species inhabits canals, ponds, streams, and flooded rice paddies, in both fresh and brackish water, and is found in particular abundance during the rainy season. The species feeds on mosquito larvae and worms and also eats the scales of other fishes (lepidophagy), the species may have potential use in controlling malaria and parasites.

The fish are harvested and sold for food in local markets.

Several other species of family Ambassidae were formerly classified in genus Chanda, including the well-known Indian glassy fish, Parambassis ranga, the "glassfish" of the aquarium trade; and the highfin glassy perchlet, Parambassis lala, once considered the type species of the genus.

The elongate glassy perchlet is known by a variety of names locally, including "perchlet" and several variations on its generic name ("chanda", "channa", etc.); internationally it is also known as the elongated glassfish.
