= Parambassis piratica =

Conservation status
- Least Concern (IUCN 3.1)

Scientific classification
- Kingdom: Animalia
- Phylum: Chordata
- Class: Actinopterygii
- Division: Teleostei
- Order: Mugiliformes
- Family: Ambassidae
- Genus: Parambassis
- Species: P. piratica

Binomial name
- Parambassis piratica T. R. Roberts, 1989

Synonyms
- Paradoxodacna piratica

Species of ray-finned fish

Parambassis piratica is a species of ray-finned fish in the family Ambassidae, the Asiatic glassfishes. It was described in 1989 and placed in a new monotypic genus of its own, Paradoxodacna, but was later moved into Parambassis. It is native to Indonesia, where it occurs in Sumatra and southern and western Borneo.

This species grows to a length of 9 centimetres (3.5 in) SL. It has specialized teeth and retrognathous jaws: the upper jaw is longer than the lower. It eats the scales of other fish. This habit inspired its species name, piratica.

This fish lives in tropical streams and rivers.
