= Ambassis fontoynonti =

Conservation status
- Data Deficient (IUCN 3.1)

Scientific classification
- Kingdom: Animalia
- Phylum: Chordata
- Class: Actinopterygii
- Order: Mugiliformes
- Family: Ambassidae
- Genus: Ambassis
- Species: A. fontoynonti

Binomial name
- Ambassis fontoynonti Pellegrin, 1932

Species of ray-finned fish

Ambassis fontoynonti, commonly known as the dusky glass perch, is a species of ray-finned fish in the family Ambassidae. It is endemic to rivers in eastern Madagascar. Its natural habitat is rivers. It is threatened by habitat loss. The specific name honours the pathologist Maurice Fontoynont (1869-1948) who was president of the Malagasy Academy.
