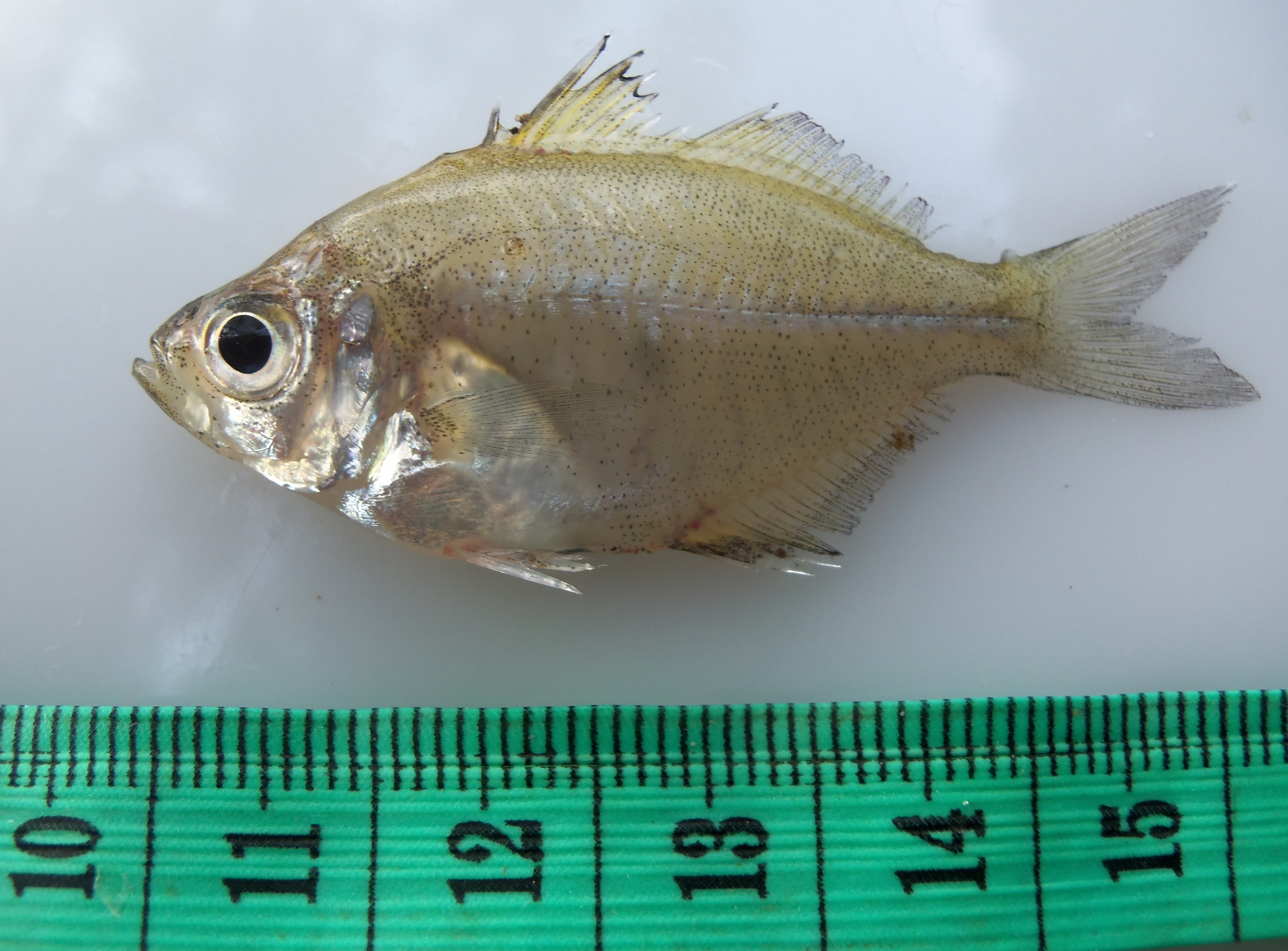
- Indonesia, Toba Lake, 8-19-2014, 6.2 cm,

Conservation status
- Least Concern (IUCN 3.1)

Scientific classification
- Kingdom: Animalia
- Phylum: Chordata
- Class: Actinopterygii
- Division: Teleostei
- Order: Mugiliformes
- Family: Ambassidae
- Genus: Chanda
- Species: C. siamensis

Binomial name
- Chanda siamensis Fowler, 1937

Synonyms
- Ambassis siamensis (Fowler, 1937); Chanda punctulata Fraser-Brunner, 1955; Parambassis siamensis (Fowler, 1937); Parambassis punctulata (Fraser-Brunner, 1955)

= Chanda siamensis =

Species of ray-finned fish

Chanda siamensis, the Siamese glassfish, is a species of freshwater ray-finned fish in the Asiatic glassfish family Ambassidae. It is native to the mainland Southeast Asia in Thailand, Cambodia, Vietnam, and Laos; records from Singapore and Java (Indonesia) probably are introductions. Its range includes the Mekong, Mae Klong, and Chao Phraya basins. It grows to 7.5 cm (3.0 in) standard length, although typical length is about 4 cm (1.6 in).

In the aquarium fish trade, fish are often injected with dyes to give them bright colors such as blue, yellow, and orange. These are commonly called "rainbow fish" to make them appear more attractive. However, after some time, these artificial colors gradually fade away on their own.
