= Gymnochanda =

Scientific classification
- Kingdom: Animalia
- Phylum: Chordata
- Class: Actinopterygii
- Order: Mugiliformes
- Family: Ambassidae
- Genus: Gymnochanda; Fraser-Brunner, 1955

Type species
- Gymnochanda filamentosa Fraser-Brunner, 1955

Species
- 5, see text

Genus of ray-finned fishes

Gymnochanda is a genus of ray-finned fishes in the family Ambassidae, the Asiatic glassfishes. They are native to turbid fresh water habitats near peat or swamp forests in Peninsular Malaysia, Borneo, Sumatra and Belitung Island.

They are among the smallest members of the family, reaching a maximum standard length of 2.2–3.8 cm (0.9–1.5 in) depending on the exact species involved. They have no scales and are transparent, revealing the silvery sheen of the peritoneum lining the abdominal cavity. They are sexually dimorphic, with males bearing longer fins and brighter colors than females.

== Species ==
There are 5 species in the genus:

- Gymnochanda filamentosa Fraser-Brunner, 1955
- Gymnochanda flamea T. R. Roberts, 1995
- Gymnochanda limi Kottelat, 1995
- Gymnochanda ploegi H. H. Tan & K. K. P. Lim, 2014
- Gymnochanda verae H. H. Tan & K. K. P. Lim, 2011
