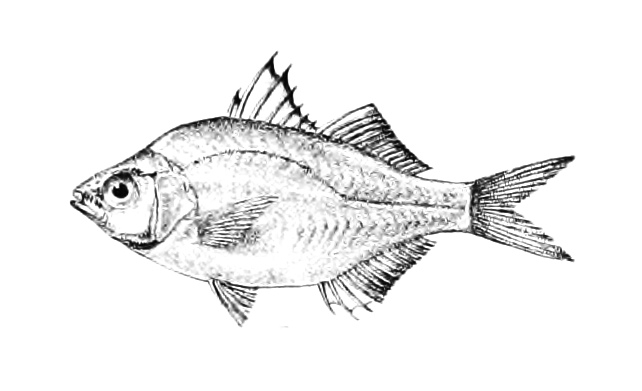
- Illustration from 1878
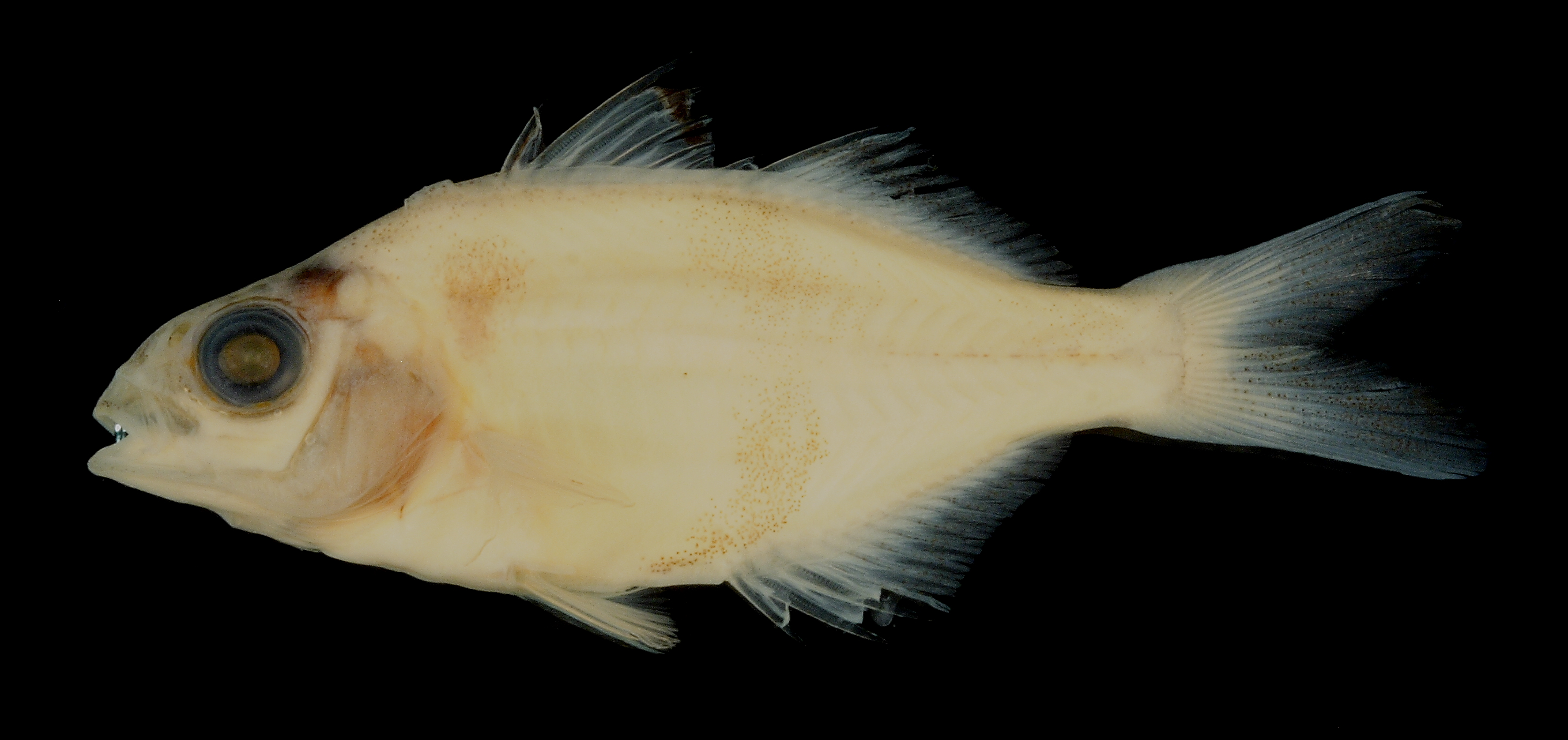
- Preserved

Conservation status
- Least Concern (IUCN 3.1)

Scientific classification
- Kingdom: Animalia
- Phylum: Chordata
- Class: Actinopterygii
- Order: Mugiliformes
- Family: Ambassidae
- Genus: Chanda
- Species: C. baculis

Binomial name
- Chanda baculis F. Hamilton, 1822

Synonyms
- Ambassis baculis; Channa baculis (lapsus); Parambassis beculis; Pseudambassis baculis

= Chanda baculis =

Species of fish

Chanda baculis, also known as Himalayan glassy perchlet, is a species of freshwater ray-finned fish in the Asiatic glassfish family Ambassidae and can reach a maximum length of 7 centimetres (2.8 in).

== Distribution and habitat ==
It is found in the Himalayan and Indo-Gangetic plains and occurs in ponds, ditches, pools and rivers.
