= Tetracentrum =

Scientific classification
- Kingdom: Animalia
- Phylum: Chordata
- Class: Actinopterygii
- Clade: Ovalentaria
- Order: Mugiliformes
- Family: Ambassidae
- Genus: Tetracentrum; W. J. Macleay, 1883

Type species
- Tetracentrum apogonoides W. J. Macleay, 1883

Synonyms
- Negambassis Whitley, 1935; Synechopterus Norman, 1935; Xenambassis Schultz, 1945

Genus of ray-finned fishes

Tetracentrum is a genus of ray-finned fish in the family Ambassidae, the Asiatic glassfishes. They are all native to freshwater in New Guinea.

== Species ==
There are currently three recognized species in this genus:

- Tetracentrum apogonoides W. J. Macleay, 1883 (Four-spined glass perchlet)
- Tetracentrum caudovittatus (Norman, 1935) (Kokoda glass perchlet)
- Tetracentrum honessi (L. P. Schultz, 1945) (Honess' glass perchlet)
