= Naziritor =

Scientific classification
- Kingdom: Animalia
- Phylum: Chordata
- Class: Actinopterygii
- Order: Cypriniformes
- Family: Cyprinidae
- Subfamily: Torinae
- Genus: Naziritor; Mirza & M. N. Javed, 1985

Type species
- Tor zhobensis Mirza, 1967

Genus of freshwater fish

Naziritor is a small genus of freshwater ray-finned fish belonging to the family Cyprinidae, which includes the carps, barbs and related fishes. The fishes in this genus are found in South Asia.

== Species ==
The following species are classified within Naziritor:

- Naziritor chelynoides (McClelland, 1839) (Dark mahseer)
- Naziritor zhobensis (Mirza, 1967) (Zhobi mahseer)
