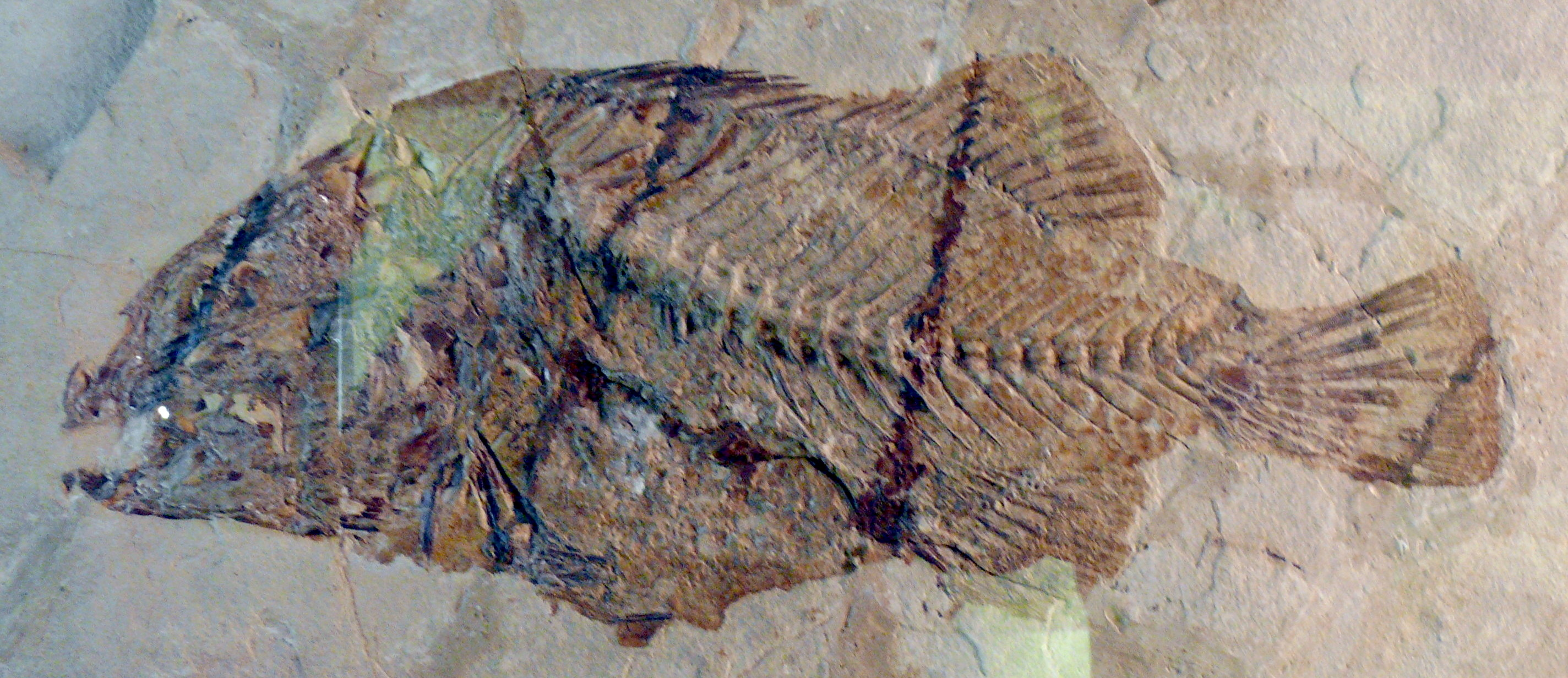
- Specimen of C. gigas

Scientific classification
- Kingdom: Animalia
- Phylum: Chordata
- Class: Actinopterygii
- Clade: Percomorpha
- Genus: †Cyclopoma; Agassiz, 1833

Species
- †C. folmeri Weems, 1999; †C. gigas Agassiz, 1833; †C. spinosum Agassiz, 1833

Synonyms
- Smerdis Agassiz, 1833 (in part)

= Cyclopoma =

Cyclopoma Temporal range: Ypresian to Lutetian

Extinct genus of fishes

Cyclopoma (from Greek: κύκλος cyclos, 'circular' and Greek: πῶμᾰ pôma 'cover') is an extinct genus of marine percomorph fish from the Eocene. It is known from the Ypresian to the Lutetian of Europe and eastern North America.

It is alternatively classified in either the Percichthyidae (which otherwise contains only species from South America and Australia) or in the Centropomidae (represented by modern snooks).

The following species are known:

- †C. folmeri Weems, 1999 - Ypresian of Virginia, USA (Nanjemoy Formation)
- †C. gigas Agassiz, 1833 - Ypresian of Monte Bolca, Italy (=Amia indica Volta, 1796, Smerdis micracanthus Agassiz, 1833)
- †C. spinosum Agassiz, 1833 - Ypresian of Monte Bolca, Italy (not recognized in more recent reviews)

An indeterminate species is known from the Lutetian-aged Lutetian limestone of France.

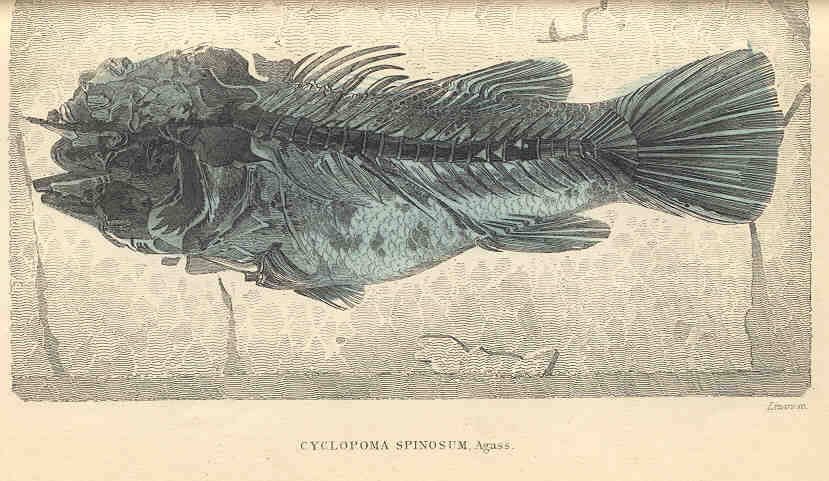
Agassiz's famous C. spinosum specimen

As its name suggests, C. gigas was a large fish that could reach up to 0.5 metres (1.6 ft) in length. It likely inhabited brackish waters close to river mouths.

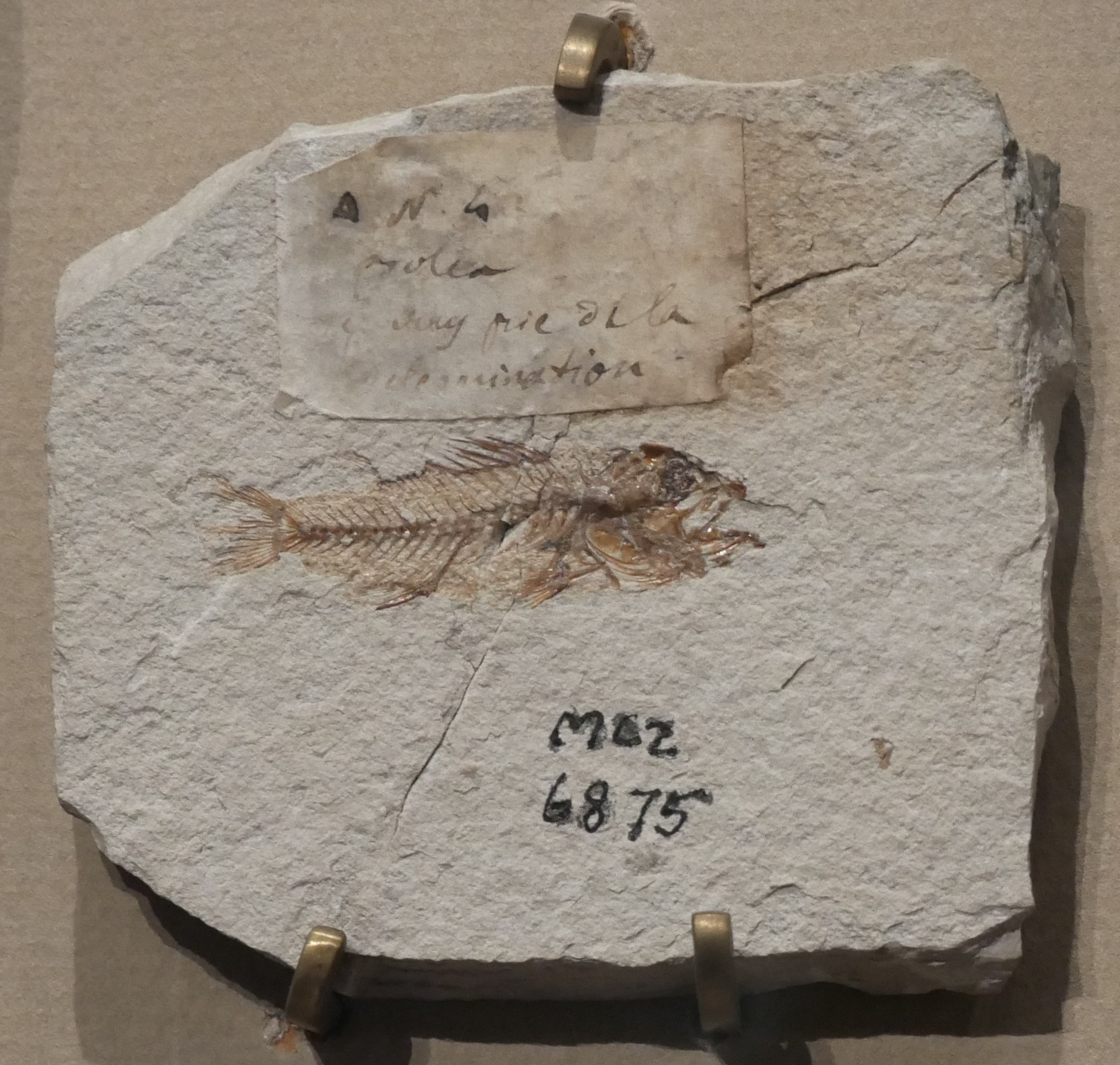
Small individual of Cyclopoma sp. from Monte Bolca

It has been alleged that Louis Agassiz struggled with excavating the type specimen of C. spinosum, despite continuously studying it. For two nights, he dreamed of the specimen appearing fully restored, and on the third night, sketched his vision of the restored specimen while half-awake. When he continued preparing the fossil specimen the following day, the fully excavated specimen was allegedly found to be exactly as he had dreamed and sketched.

== See also ==
- List of prehistoric bony fish genera
- Prehistoric fish
