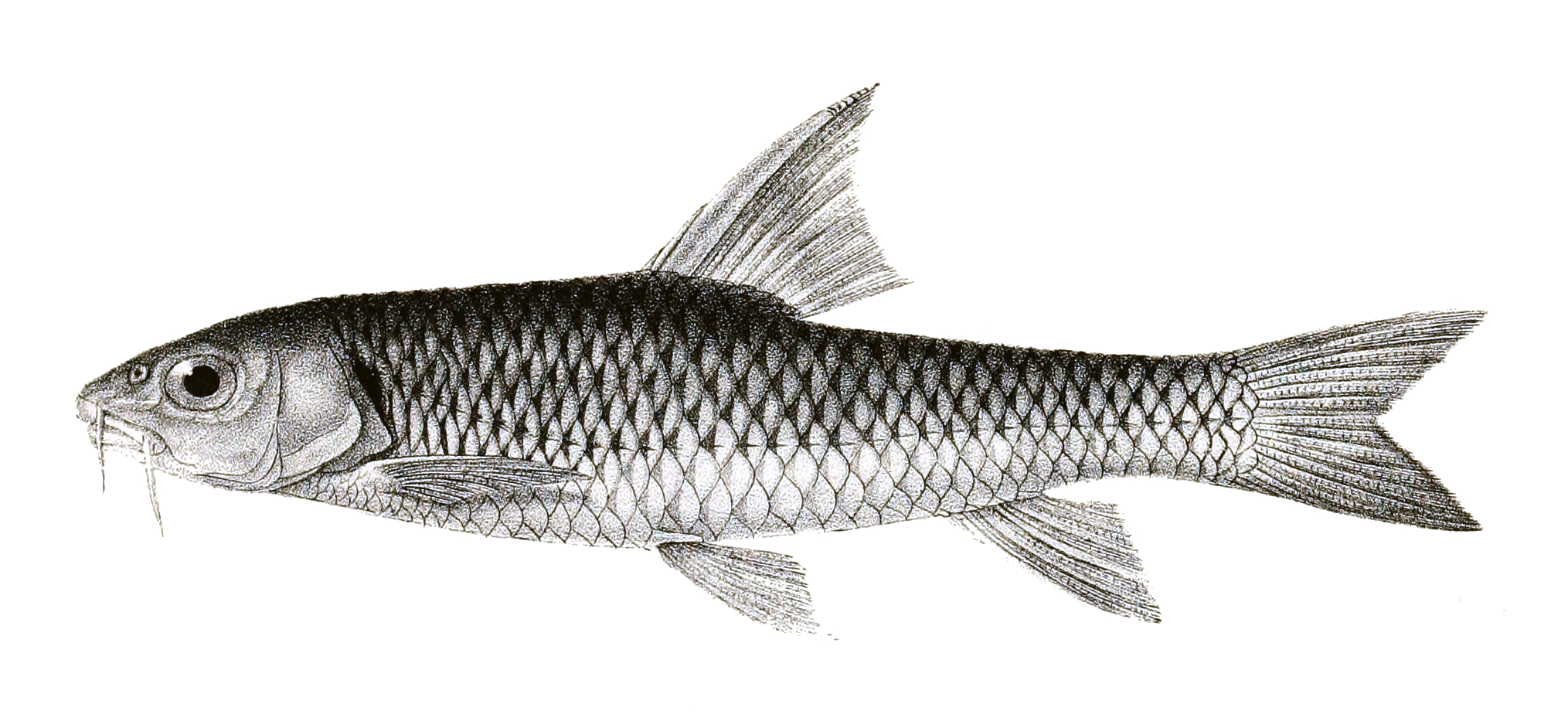

Conservation status
- Vulnerable (IUCN 3.1)

Scientific classification
- Kingdom: Animalia
- Phylum: Chordata
- Class: Actinopterygii
- Order: Cypriniformes
- Family: Cyprinidae
- Genus: Naziritor
- Species: N. chelynoides

Binomial name
- Naziritor chelynoides (McClelland, 1839)

Synonyms
- Barbus chelynoides McClelland, 1839; Puntius chelynoides McClelland, 1839; Tor chelynoides McClelland, 1839; Barbus chilinoides Günther, 1868; Puntius chilinoides Günther, 1868; Tor chilinoides Günther, 1868

= Naziritor chelynoides =

Species of fish

Naziritor chelynoides, the dark mahseer, is a species of ray-finned fish in the genus Naziritor. It is found in India and Nepal.
