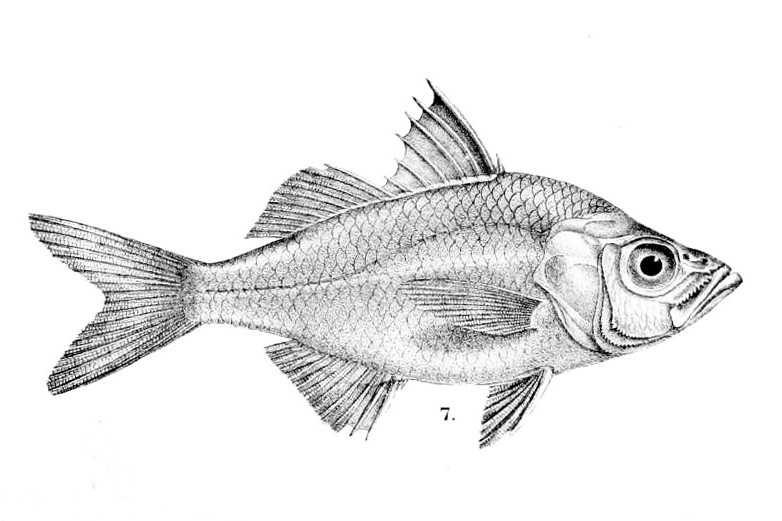
- Parambassis dayi

Scientific classification
- Kingdom: Animalia
- Phylum: Chordata
- Class: Actinopterygii
- Clade: Ovalentaria
- Order: Mugiliformes
- Family: Ambassidae
- Genus: Parambassis; Bleeker, 1874

Type species
- Ambassis apogonoides Bleeker, 1851

Synonyms
- Acanthoperca Castelnau, 1878; Paradoxodacna Roberts, 1989; Whitleyia Fowler & Bean, 1930

= Parambassis =

Genus of ray-finned fishes

Parambassis is a genus of freshwater fish in the Asiatic glassfish family Ambassidae of order Perciformes. The type species is the Iridescent glassy perchlet (Ambassis apogonoides). These fishes originate mostly from Southeast Asia, but the species range across the Indomalayan and Australasian realms, from Pakistan, China and India south through Indonesia and New Guinea. Although primarily found in fresh water, a few species can also be seen in brackish water. The Parambassis species range in maximum size from 4–24 cm (1.5–9.5 in), but they are similar in appearance, with a lozenge-shaped form, typical perciform fins, and semitransparent or transparent body. Several of the species are common food fish in local markets, and some are kept as aquarium fish.

== Species ==
There are currently 11 currently recognized species in this genus:

- Parambassis altipinnis G. R. Allen, 1982 (High-finned glassy perchlet)
- Parambassis apogonoides (Bleeker, 1851) (Iridescent glassy perchlet)
- Parambassis confinis (M. C. W. Weber, 1913) (Sepik glassy perchlet)
- Parambassis dayi (Bleeker, 1874) (Day's glassy perchlet)
- Parambassis gulliveri (Castelnau, 1878) (Giant glassfish)
- Parambassis kapuasensis Ghazali, Lavoué, Sukmono, Wibowo, Hubert & Nor, 2026 (Kapuas glass perchlet)
- Parambassis macrolepis (Bleeker, 1856)
- Parambassis seruyanensis Ghazali, Lavoué, Sukmono, Wibowo, Hubert & Nor, 2026 (Seruyan glass perchlet)
- Parambassis sumatrana Ghazali, Lavoué, Sukmono, Wibowo, Hubert & Nor, 2026 (Sumatra glass perchlet)
- Parambassis thomassi (F. Day, 1870) (Western Ghats glassy perchlet)
- Parambassis wolffii (Bleeker, 1850) (Dusky-fin glassy perchlet)

Synonyms

- Parambassis piratica (Roberts, 1989); valid as P. macrolepis
