= Dapaloides =

Dapaloides Temporal range: Early Oligocene to Early Miocene

Scientific classification
- Kingdom: Animalia
- Phylum: Chordata
- Class: Actinopterygii
- Division: Teleostei
- Order: Perciformes
- Genus: †Dapaloides; Gaudant, 1985

Species
- †D. sieblosensis (Winkler, 1880); †D. miloni Gaudant, 1989

Extinct genus of fishes

Dapaloides is an extinct genus of prehistoric estuarine ray-finned fish that lived during the early Oligocene to the early Miocene epoch. Many of the remains now assigned to this genus were previously assigned to Dapalis. It was previously classified as a "percichthyid" under a former treatment of the family, but is now treated as an indeterminate perciform.

It contains two species known from Europe:

- †D. sieblosensis (Winkler, 1880) - Rupelian to Early Miocene of Germany (=Smerdis sieblosensis Winkler, 1880, S. sandbergeri Winkler, 1880, S. rhoenensis Winkler, 1880, Perca macrantha Winkler, 1880) [body fossils and otoliths]
- †D. miloni Gaudant, 1989 - Rupelian of Brittany, France [body fossils and otoliths]

== See also ==
- Prehistoric fish
- List of prehistoric bony fish
