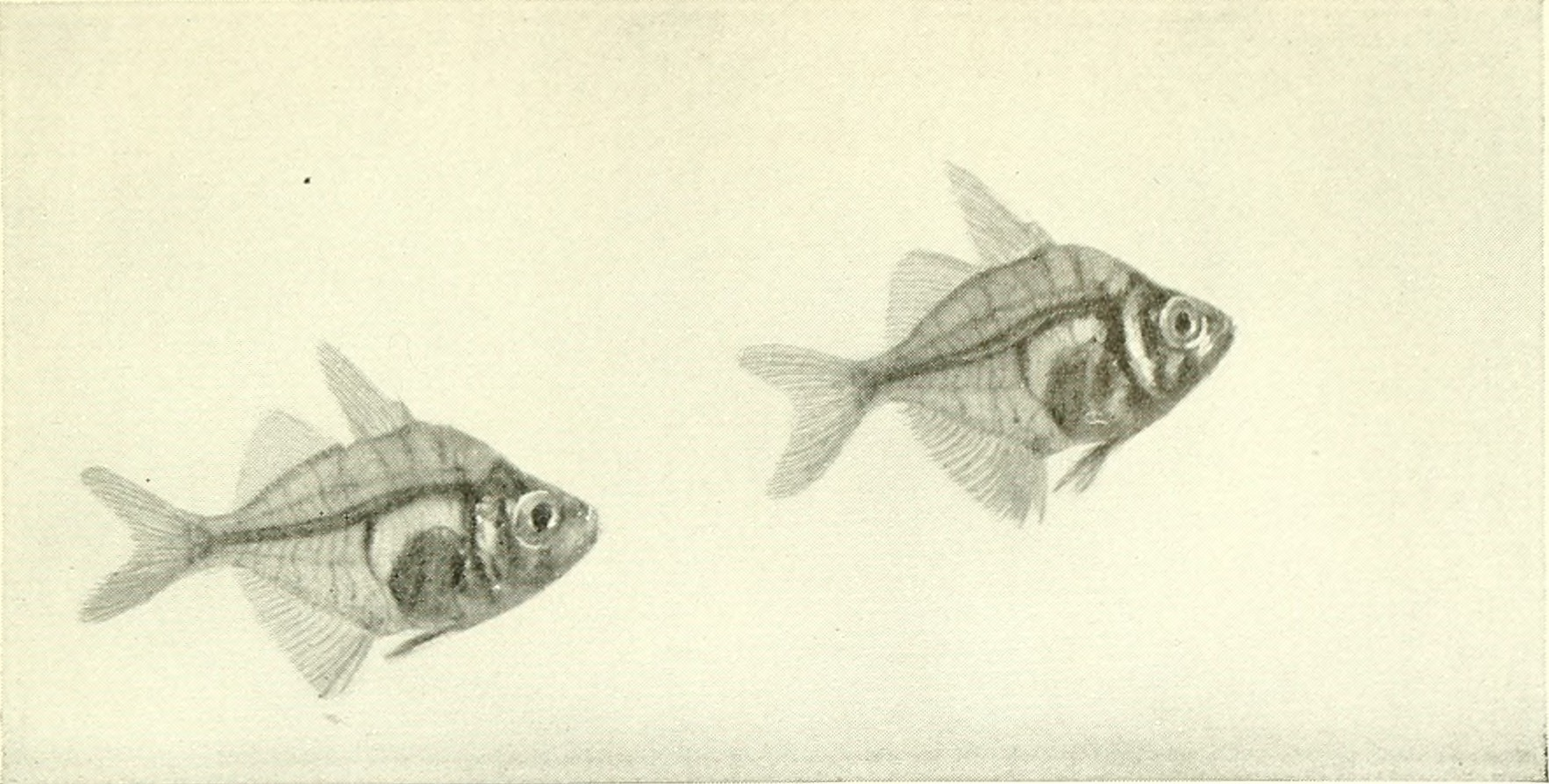
- Illustration from The Complete Aquarium (book; 1936)

Conservation status
- Near Threatened (IUCN 3.1)

Scientific classification
- Kingdom: Animalia
- Phylum: Chordata
- Class: Actinopterygii
- Order: Mugiliformes
- Family: Ambassidae
- Genus: Pseudambassis; Bleeker, 1874
- Species: P. lala

Binomial name
- Pseudambassis lala (Hamilton, 1822)

Synonyms
- Ambassis alta Cuvier; Chanda lala Hamilton, 1822; Pseudambassis lala (Hamilton, 1822); Parambassis lala

= Pseudambassis lala =

Species of ray-finned fish

Pseudambassis lala, commonly known as the highfin glassy perchlet, is a species of ray-finned fish in the family Ambassidae. It is endemic to South Asia: India, Bangladesh, Nepal and Myanmar, possibly Pakistan. It is the only member of the genus Pseudambassis.
