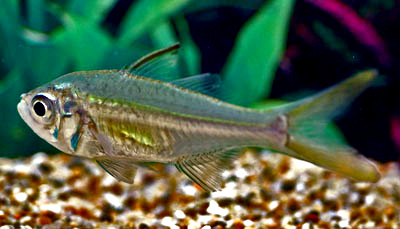
- Ambassis miops

Scientific classification
- Kingdom: Animalia
- Phylum: Chordata
- Class: Actinopterygii
- Division: Teleostei
- Order: Mugiliformes
- Family: Ambassidae
- Genus: Ambassis; G. Cuvier, 1828

Type species
- Centropomus ambassis Lacépède, 1802

Synonyms
- Konopickia Whitley, 1937; Priopidichthys Whitley, 1935; Priopis Kuhl & van Hasselt, 1830

= Ambassis =

Genus of ray-finned fishes

Ambassis is a genus of ray-finned fish in the family Ambassidae, the Asiatic glassfishes. They are found widely in the Indo-Pacific region, with species in fresh, brackish and coastal marine waters.

This genus includes fish known commonly as glassies, perchlets, and common glassfishes. The genus name was derived from the specific epithet ambassis of "Aspro ambassis" Commerçon 1767-1771, which in turn derives from the vernacular name “l’ambasse”, later "l'ambache", used by Philibert Commerçon in his unpublished notes for a small, common fish at Île Bourbon (Réunion). Valenciennes (1867) reported that Commerçon used the term to mean “deux sous”, a 19th-century French euphemism for a cheap or worthless thing, referring to the fish’s abundance and low value. FishBase, However, implies it is from the Greek anabasis, meaning 'climbing up'.

See The dictionary definition of deux sous at Wiktionary.

== Species ==
There are currently 19 recognized species in this genus:

- Ambassis ambassis (Lacépède, 1802) – Commerson's glassy
- Ambassis bleekeri Maugé, 1984
- Ambassis buruensis Bleeker, 1856 – Buru glass perchlet
- Ambassis buton Popta, 1918 – Buton glassy perchlet
- Ambassis denticulata Klunzinger, 1870
- Ambassis dussumieri G. Cuvier, 1828 – Malabar glassy perchlet
- Ambassis fontoynonti Pellegrin, 1932 – dusky glass perch
- Ambassis interrupta Bleeker, 1853 – long-spined glass perchlet
- Ambassis kopsii Bleeker, 1858 – Kops' glass perchlet
- Ambassis macracanthus Bleeker, 1849 – estuarine glass perchlet
- Ambassis marianus Günther, 1880 – estuary perchlet
- Ambassis miops Günther, 1872 – flag-tailed glass perchlet
- Ambassis nalua (F. Hamilton, 1822) – scalloped perchlet
- Ambassis natalensis Gilchrist & W. W. Thompson, 1908 – slender glassy
- Ambassis octava Ghazali, Lavoué, Nor, Muhammad-Rasul & Tan, 2023 – Malaysian glass-perchlet
- Ambassis telkara Whitley, 1935
- Ambassis thermalis Cuvier, 1829
- Ambassis urotaenia Bleeker, 1852 – banded-tail glassy perchlet
- Ambassis vachellii J. Richardson, 1846 – Vachelli's glass perchlet

Synonyms

- Ambassis commersonii (Lacépède, 1802); valid as A. ambassis
- Ambassis gymnocephalus (Lacépède, 1802) (bald glassy); valid as A. ambassis
