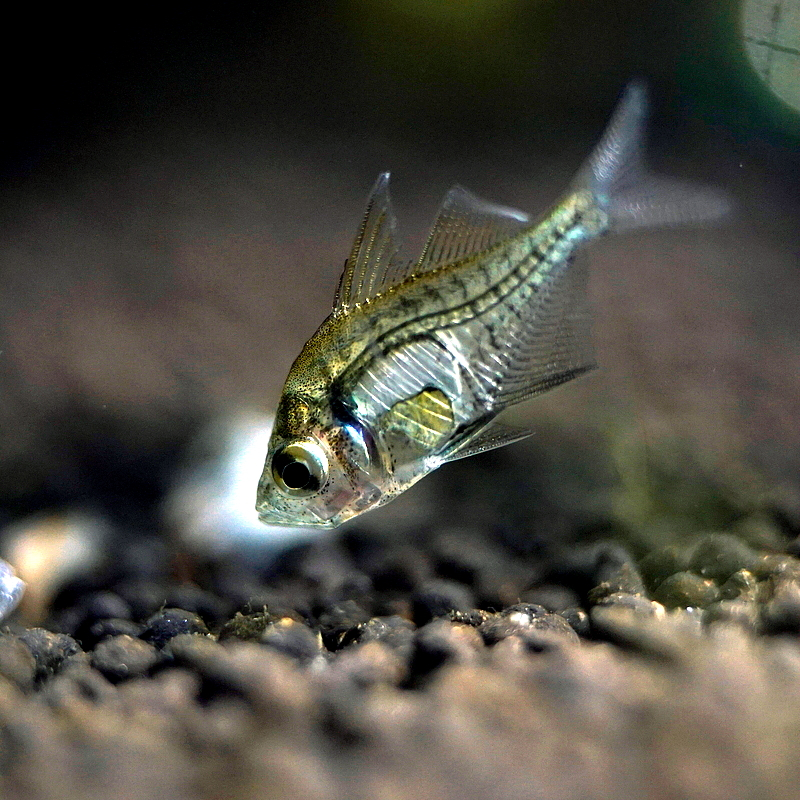

Conservation status
- Least Concern (IUCN 3.1)

Scientific classification
- Kingdom: Animalia
- Phylum: Chordata
- Class: Actinopterygii
- Order: Mugiliformes
- Family: Ambassidae
- Genus: Parambassis
- Species: P. ranga

Binomial name
- Parambassis ranga (F. Hamilton, 1822)

Synonyms
- Chanda ranga F. Hamilton, 1822

= Parambassis ranga =

Species of ray-finned fish

Parambassis ranga, commonly known as the Indian glassy fish, Indian glassy perch, or Indian X-ray fish, is a species of freshwater ray-finned fish in the Asiatic glassfish family Ambassidae. It is native to an area of South Asia from Pakistan to Vietnam, Malaysia and Bangladesh.

The Indian glassy fish has an extraordinarily transparent body, revealing its bones and internal organs; the male develops a dark edge to the dorsal fin. The fish grows to a maximum overall length of 80 mm (3.1 in).

It occurs in standing water, especially in impoundments, and it breeds prolifically during the rainy season. The species feeds on crustaceans, annelid worms, and other invertebrates. It is, in turn, prey for larger fish, including snakeheads (family Channidae).

The Indian glassy fish is not important as a food fish for humans, but is very common in the aquarium trade.

Formerly classified as Chanda ranga, the species is also known as the Indian glassfish, Indian glass perch, and Siamese glassfish.

== In the aquarium ==
Glassfish have been kept in aquarium for many years, but have a reputation for being delicate and difficult to keep. This may be related to a persistent myth that these fish need brackish water. In the wild, they more commonly inhabit fresh water, and in captivity do well in slightly soft to moderately hard dGH 7–19, slightly acidic to slightly alkaline water pH 6.5–7.5. They can tolerate a temperature range of 20–30 °C (68–86 °F).

These fish swim at the middle and lower levels of the tank, and will take most small live and frozen foods. In general, they tend not to eat dried foods (such as flake). The fish reproduce by laying the eggs (females) and then the males fertilize the eggs.

=== Dyed glassfish ===
Indian glassy fish sold to hobbyists have often been "painted", which involves injecting coloured dye into the fish's transparent tissue to make them more attractive to hobbyists. These coloured fish are often called "disco fish". Inexperienced fishkeepers are often tricked into believing such fish are natural and not told that the process is not painless and causes kidney damage to the fish.

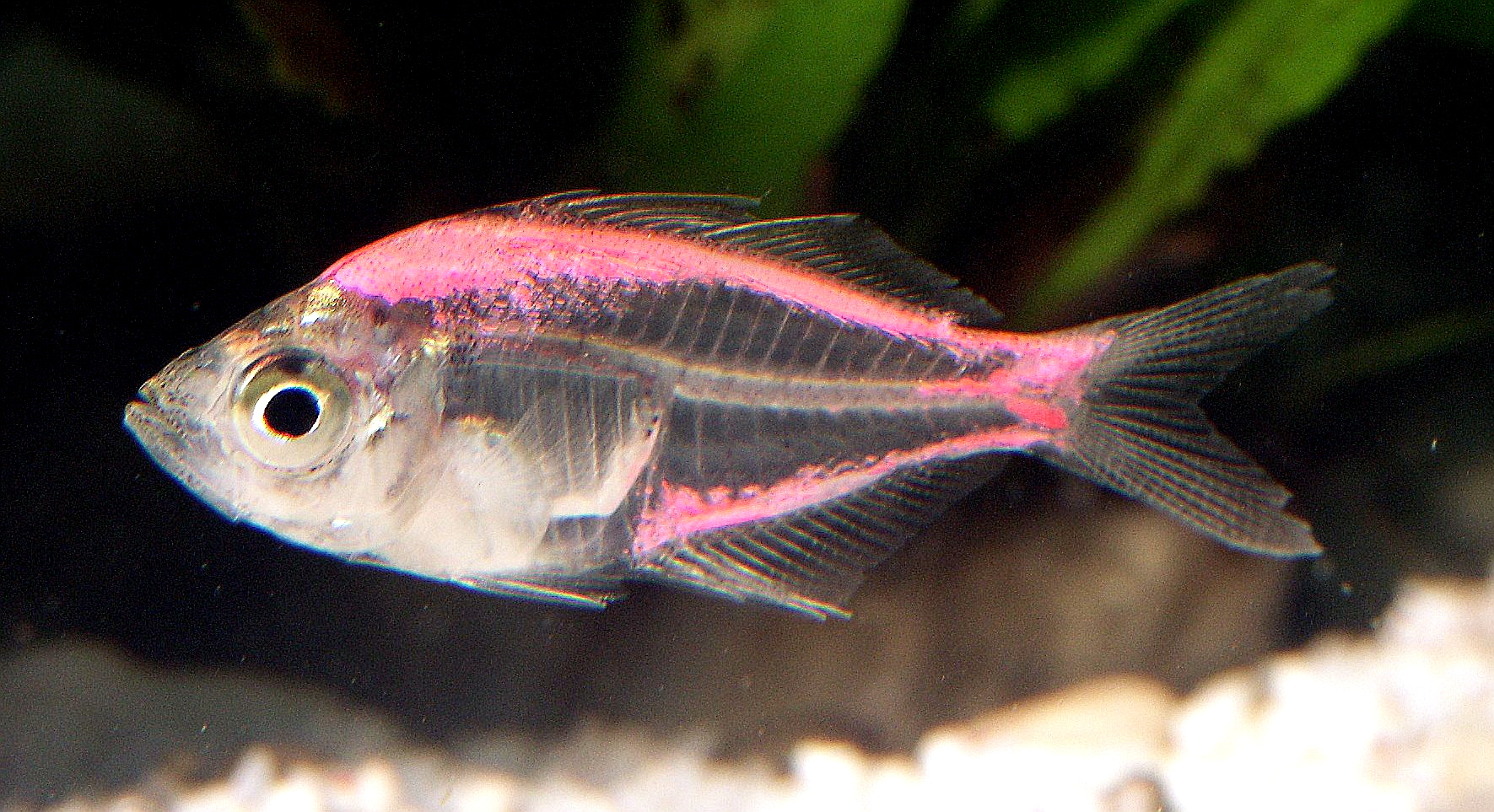
A 'painted' glassfish

Fish thus treated have suffered trauma and are susceptible to disease, including Ichthyophthirius multifiliis infection, fin rot, and the viral disease lymphocystis. The artificial coloration often fades within a short time. Healthy, unpainted specimens may live three to four years in captivity, but such individuals may be difficult to find in some localities.

== See also ==
- Indian glass barb
- Cyanogaster
- Danionella cerebrum
- Barreleye fish
- Glass frog
- Sea angel
