= Zhobi mahseer =

Conservation status
- Endangered (IUCN 3.1)

Scientific classification
- Kingdom: Animalia
- Phylum: Chordata
- Class: Actinopterygii
- Order: Cypriniformes
- Family: Cyprinidae
- Genus: Naziritor
- Species: N. zhobensis

Binomial name
- Naziritor zhobensis Mirza, 1967

Synonyms
- Tor zhobensis Mirza, 1967

Species of fish

The Zhobi mahseer (Naziritor zhobensis) is a species of freshwater ray-finned fish belonging to the family Cyprinidae, which includes the carps, barbs and related fishes. The Zhobi mahseer is endemic to Pakistan. It was described by Dr. Muhammad Ramzan Mirza as Tor zhobensis in 1967 with its type locality given as the basin of the Zhob River in Pakistan.

== See also ==
- Mahseer
