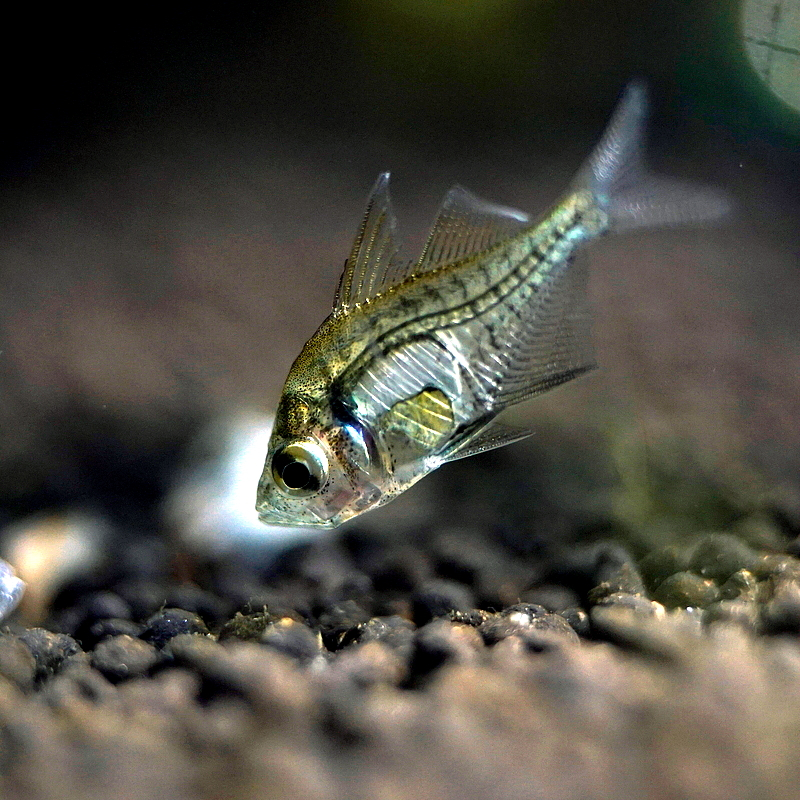
- Indian glassy fish, Parambassis ranga

Scientific classification
- Kingdom: Animalia
- Phylum: Chordata
- Class: Actinopterygii
- Order: Mugiliformes
- Family: Ambassidae; Klunzinger, 1870

Genera
- Ambassis; Chanda; Denariusa; Gymnochanda; Parambassis; Pseudambassis; Pseudoambassis; Tetracentrum; †Dapalis; †Kapurdia; †Neodapalis

= Ambassidae =

Asiatic glassfishes Temporal range: Ypresian to present

Family of ray-finned fishes

The Asiatic glassfishes are a family, the Ambassidae, of freshwater and marine ray-finned fishes. Some species are known as perchlets.

The family has also been called Chandidae, and some sources continue to use the name, but as Ambassidae was used earlier, it has precedence over Chandidae, which was first used in 1905.

== Taxonomy ==
This family was formerly classified in the order Perciformes but most authorities currently consider this order to be paraphyletic. Currently the Ambassidae are of uncertain affinities (incertae sedis) within the subseries Ovalentaria.

== Description ==
The largest species reaches a maximum size around 26 cm (10 in). Many of the species are noted for their transparent or semitransparent bodies, which makes them desirable for the aquarium trade. The Indian glassy fish (Parambassis ranga) is transparent, but showier specimens that had been injected with artificial coloring were sold as novelty pets in the 1990s. Since then, these "painted fish" have become much less popular, with more fishkeepers seeking naturally pigmented specimens.

The species in the family are native to Asia, Oceania, the Indian Ocean, and the western Pacific Ocean. The family includes eight genera and about 51 species.

== Fossils ==
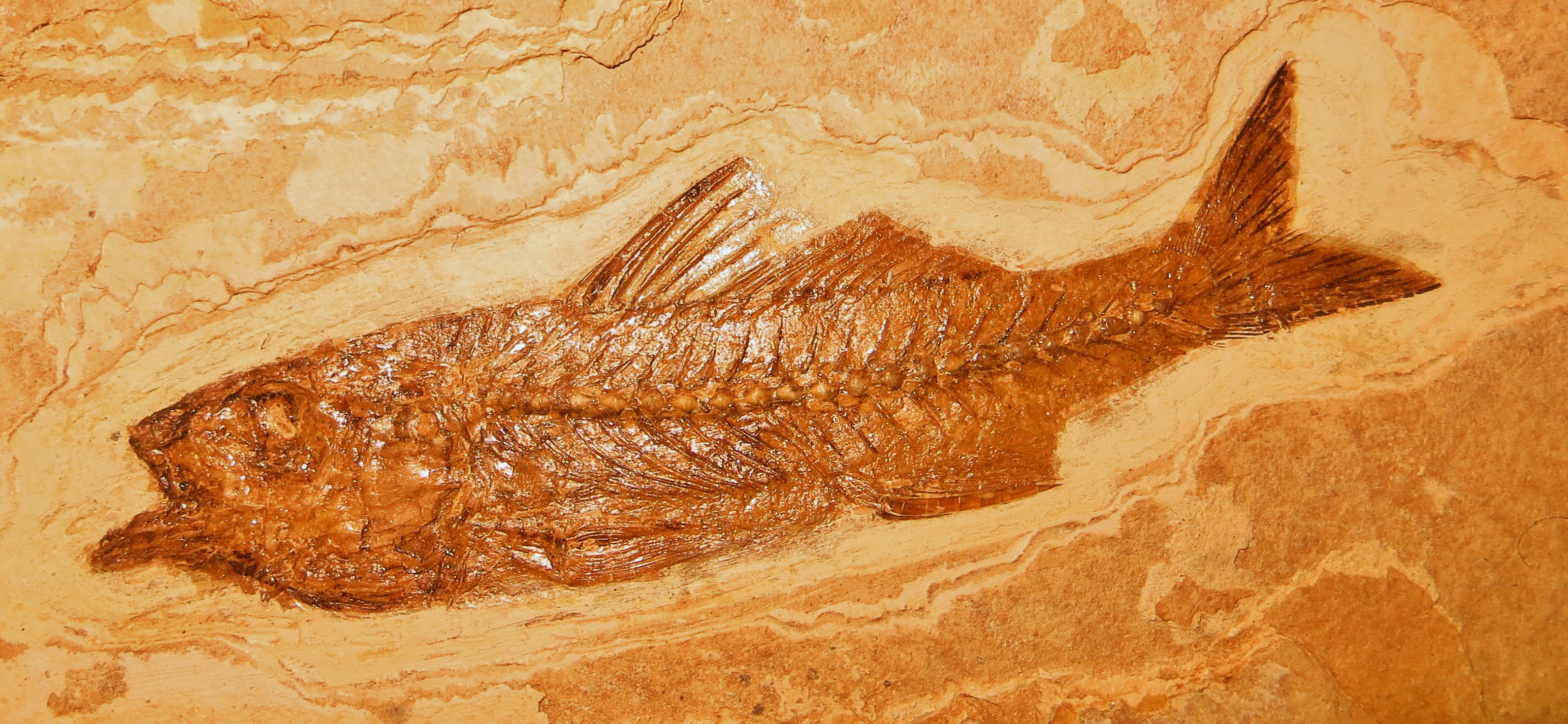
Dapalis macrurus

The earliest fossil remains of this family are from the Early Eocene, with the fossil genus Kapurdia from the early Eocene of Rajasthan, India and otoliths of Ambassis antipodus from the Early Eocene of New Zealand. One of the most notable fossil members of the family is Dapalis, which appears to be a stem group-glassfish that was dominant in freshwater and estuarine ecosystems throughout Europe from the Middle Eocene to Middle Miocene, with 21 species known from both fossil skeletons and otoliths.
