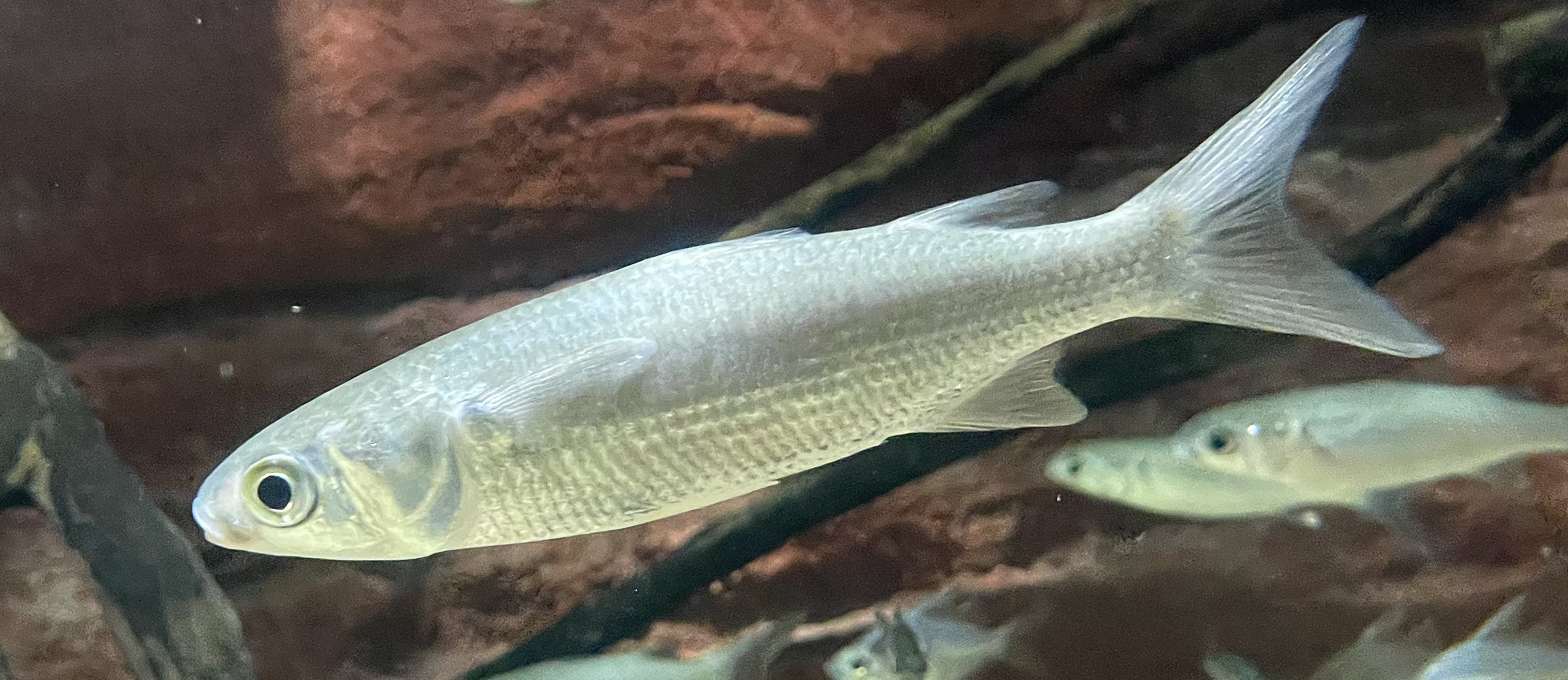
- Yellow-eye mullet (Aldrichetta forsteri)

Scientific classification
- Kingdom: Animalia
- Phylum: Chordata
- Class: Actinopterygii
- Division: Teleostei
- Clade: Ovalentaria
- Order: Mugiliformes; Günther, 1880

Families
- Mugilidae; Ambassidae

= Mugiliformes =

Mugiliformes Temporal range: Early Eocene–recent

Order of fishes

Mugiliformes is a small order of percomorph fish in the clade Ovalentaria.

This order is recognized by the Catalog of Fishes (2025). It contains only two families:

- Mugilidae Jarocki, 1822 - mullets (57 species)
- Ambassidae Klunzinger, 1870 - Asiatic glassfishes (75 species)

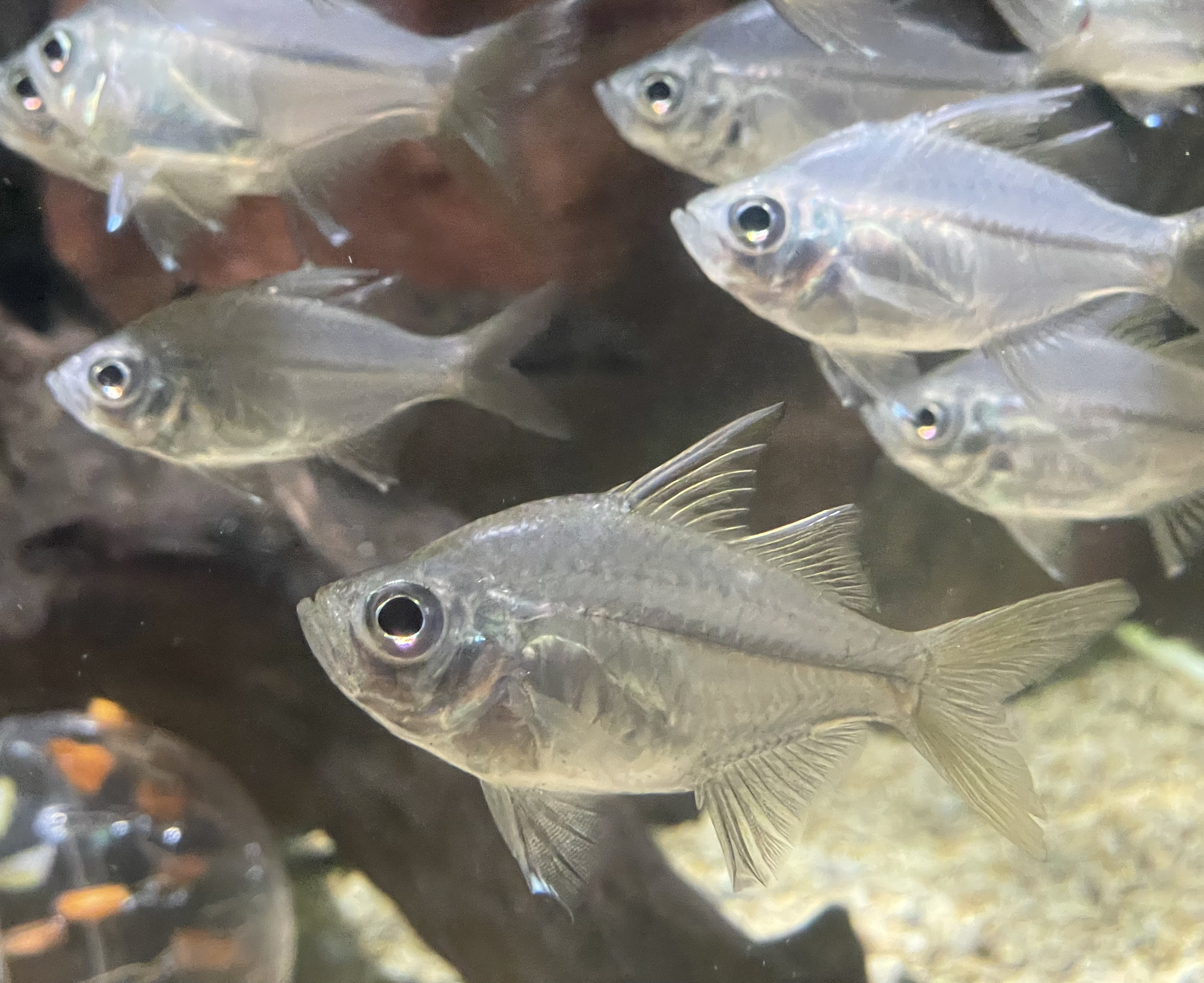
Agassiz's perchlet (Pseudombassis agassizii)

Until recently, this order was restricted to only the mullets, but phylogenetic studies support the Asiatic glassfishes (previously placed as incertae sedis within the Ovalentaria) being their closest relatives. The order is thought to be the sister group to the Blenniiformes. Other authors instead treat this order as a clade within an expanded Blenniiformes, and also find the Congrogadidae to be allied with the mullet-glassfish clade.
