= Calich Pond =

Pond in Alghero, Sardinia, Italy

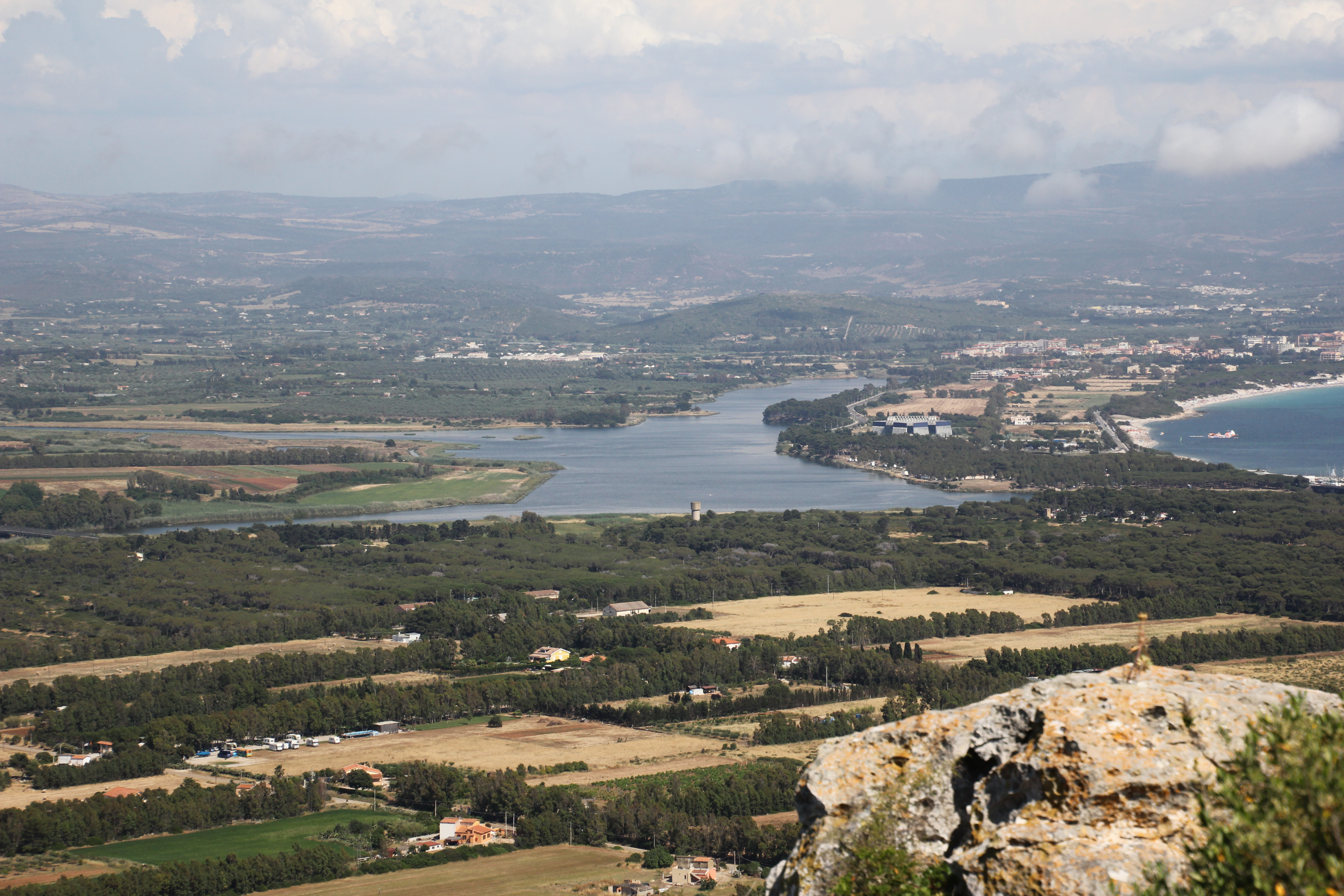
- Alghero - Calich Pond
- Interactive map of Calich Pond
- Location: Alghero, Sassari, Sardinia, Italy
- Coordinates: 40°35′46″N 08°17′59″E
- Primary inflows: Rio Barca (with Rio Filibertu, Rio Sassu, and Rio Serra), Oruni Canal, and Rio Calvia.
- Primary outflows: Fertilia Canal
- Max. length: 25 km (16 mi)
- Max. width: 03 km (1.9 mi)
- Surface area: 1 km^{2} (0.39 sq mi)
- Average depth: 1 m (3 ft 3 in)
- Max. depth: 2 m (6 ft 7 in)
- Water volume: 0,001 km^{3} (0.24 cu mi)
- Surface elevation: 0 m (0 ft)

The Calich is pond among the coastal wetlands of Alghero and Sardinia.

It overlooks the Alghero roadstead, extending from the outskirts of the city behind Maria Pia beach to the hamlet of Fertilia, before which it is connected to the Sardinian Sea by a canal, where the remains of the Roman bridge can be found. The pond is divided into sectors of the Calich proper, from the far western end to the Rio Barca, and the Calighet (small Calich), to the far eastern end. Landward, the pond is girdled by the Calich road 291 dir.

The most common diction is “pond of Calich,” but the forms “Calich pond,” “lagoon of Calich,” and “Estany del Càlic” in Algherese, as well as the form “Kalich” are equally employed. The pond gave its name to the Villaggio Calich, the first nucleus of the Fascist settlement of Fertilia, not to be confused with the Villaggio Calik Blu campsite located on the other side of the canal.

The area of the Calich pond is outside SCI ITB 010042, but included in the Capo Caccia SPA.

== Flora ==
Along the banks of the Calich pond, halophilic species such as sea fennel (Crithmum maritimum), sharp-leaved limonium (Limonium acutifolium), helichrysum, Balearic spurge (Euphorbia pithyusa), timel (Thymelaea hirsuta), spiny cornflower (Centaurea horrida), and Astragalus massiliensis grow. When the salinity of the soil decreases, shrubs and herbs such as sea rush (Juncus maritimus), bushy lemon tree (Limoniastrum monopetalum), sea aster (Aster tripolium), common sea lavender (Limonium vulgare), common reed (Phragmites australis), and sea club rush (Bolboschoenus maritimus) appear. The aquatic vegetation is represented by species such as spiral pondweed (Ruppia cirrhosa) and algae such as Enteromorpha intestinalis, Enteromorpha compressa, Chaetomorpha aerea, Lamprothamnium papulosum, Cladophora vagabunda, and sea lettuce (Ulva rigida).

== Fauna ==
The Calich pond is populated by various species of fish, although large die-offs often occur due to eutrophic conditions. The most common species are the mullet (Liza ramado), the golden mullet (Liza aurata), the grey mullet (Liza saliens), the bosega mullet (Chelon labrosus), and the grey mullet (Mugil cephalus). There are also sea bream (Sparus aurata), white seabream (Diplodus sargus), annular seabream (Diplodus annularis), sea bass (Dicentrarchus labrax), sole (Solea vulgaris), and eel (Anguilla anguilla).
