= Grey mullet =

Grey mullet can mean any of several fish in the family Mugilidae (the mullets) and having a greyish hue:

- Golden grey mullet, Chelon auratus
- Thicklip grey mullet, Chelon labrosus
- Thinlip grey mullet, Chelon ramada
- Leaping grey mullet, Chelon saliens
- Flathead grey mullet, Mugil cephalus
- Sand grey mullet, Myxus elongatus
- Boxlip grey mullet, Oedalechilus labeo
