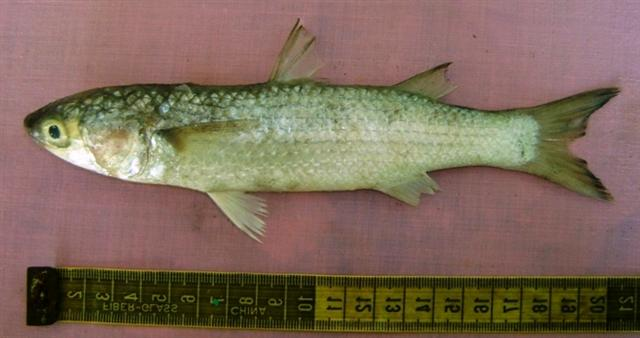

Conservation status
- Data Deficient (IUCN 3.1)

Scientific classification
- Kingdom: Animalia
- Phylum: Chordata
- Class: Actinopterygii
- Division: Teleostei
- Order: Mugiliformes
- Family: Mugilidae
- Genus: Planiliza
- Species: P. carinata

Binomial name
- Planiliza carinata (Valenciennes, 1836)

Synonyms
- Mugil carinatus Valenciennes, 1836; Liza carinatus (Valenciennes, 1836); Chelon carinatus (Valenciennes, 1836)

= Planiliza carinata =

Species of fish

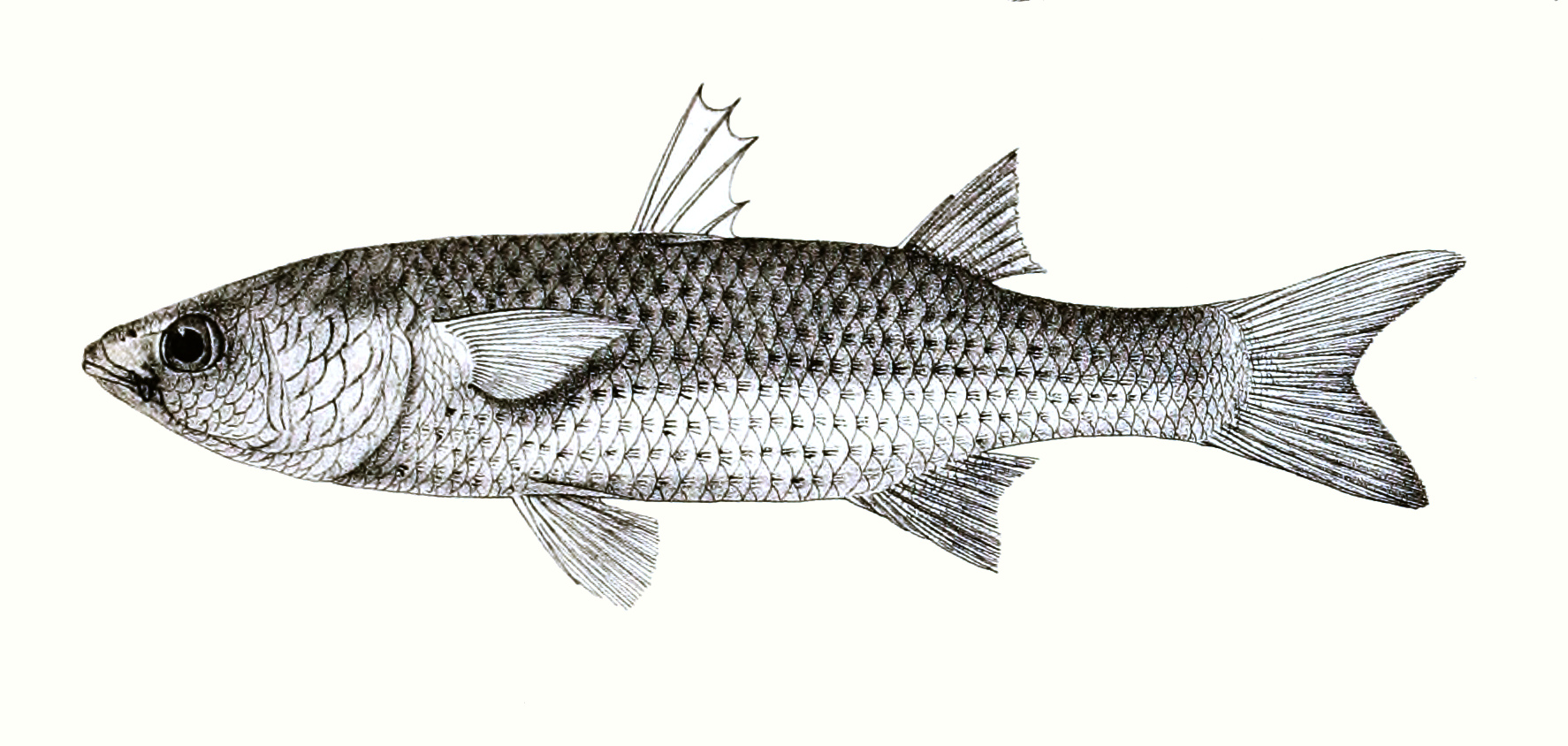
Mugil carinatus Ford 74

Planiliza carinata, the keeled mullet, is a species of grey mullet from the family Mugilidae which is found in the western Indian Ocean and eastern Mediterranean Sea. It colonised the Mediterranean by Lessepsian migration from the Red Sea through the Suez Canal. The keeled mullet is a species of minor importance in commercial fisheries.

== Description ==
Planiliza carinata has a broad head with the mouth being as wide as the head, there is a well-developed adipose eyelid which covers most of the pupil. The upper lip is thin. its height being smaller than diameter of the pupil and the corner of the mouth reaches to nearly below the front of the eye. The pectoral fin's tip lies below the origin of the first dorsal fin, axillary scale rudimentary. There are 31-39 scales on the lateral line and the scales on head extend as far forward as the anterior nostrils. It is greyish blue on the back and silvery on the flanks and belly. The dorsal fin has 5 spines and 8-9 rays while the anal fin has 3 spines and 9 rays. It grows to 30 cm (12 in) standard length but 15 cm (5.9 in) is the more normal size.

== Distribution ==
Planiliza carinata occurs in the western Indian Ocean, centred on the Red Sea. It has colonised the Mediterranean through the Suez Canal, where it is still common in the canal and its associated salt lakes, by Lessepsian migration, the first record was in the 1920s off Port Said, Egypt and has now extended as far north as south-eastern Turkey and west along the North African coast as far as Libya It has also been recorded in the freshwater Sea of Galilee in Israel where it was probably introduced among fry collected in a nearby estuary to stock the lake.

== Biology ==
Planiliza carinata is a pelagic and euryhaline species, which is also tolerant of wide temperature variations, occurring mainly in marine coastal waters migrating inshore to lagoons and estuaries where there is abundant macrophyte vegetation in the spring, moving out to deeper coastal waters in the winter. The juveniles are associated with drifting seaweed. A study in the Great Bitter Lake found that the lifespan of L. carinata is normally three years but that the most rapid growth occurs in the first year of life. Males reach sexual maturity at 12.5 cm (4.9 in) in total length while the females attain sexual maturity at 13.4 cm (5.3 in). A female may lay 24500 to 115258 eggs and the spawning season of L. carinata in Suez Bay may extend from November to March. The eggs are pelagic and non-adhesive. It feeds mainly on benthic algae and small molluscs.

=== Parasites ===
The following flatworm species have been found on P. carinata as endoparasites:

- Elliptobursa megasacculum
- Haplosplanchnus lizae
- Lasiotocus lizae
- Pseudohapladena lizae
- Saccocoelioides lizae
- Schikhobalotrema megaovus

The following flatworm species have been found as ectoparasites:

- Ligophorus bipartitus
- Ligophorus campanulatus
- Ligophorus lebedevi
- Ligophorus mamaevi
- Ligophorus simpliciformis
- Ligophorus surianoae

The copepod Caligus apodus has also been recorded as ectoparatsites.

== Human use ==
Planiliza carinata is normally caught as a by catch when fishing for other mullets and is normally smaller in size than the target species, fresh fish are normally grilled. has a lower growth rate than other mullet species but there is a high market demand in Egypt, leading to high prices, for this species, especially when processed as salted fish.

== Taxonomy ==
Planiliza carinata was named in 1836 by Achille Valenciennes as Mugil carinatus in the book Histoire naturelle des poissons. Vol. 11. by G. Cuvier, & A. Valenciennes. It was unclear what the distribution with and it was recorded from as far east as Japan. It was shown that there was a monophyletic group of three similar species which formed a species complex, Liza carinata in the Red Sea area, L. klunzingeri in the Indian Ocean from the Tigris-Euphrates Delta east to Bombay and L. affinis which is found in the western Pacific and eastern Indian Ocean (Hainan).

Recent taxonomic work on the family Mugilidae has resulted in a reorganisation the family and it has been proposed that many of the Indo-Pacific species previously assigned to the genera Liza and Chelon, as well as Paramugil parmatus, be placed in the resurrected genus Planiliza
