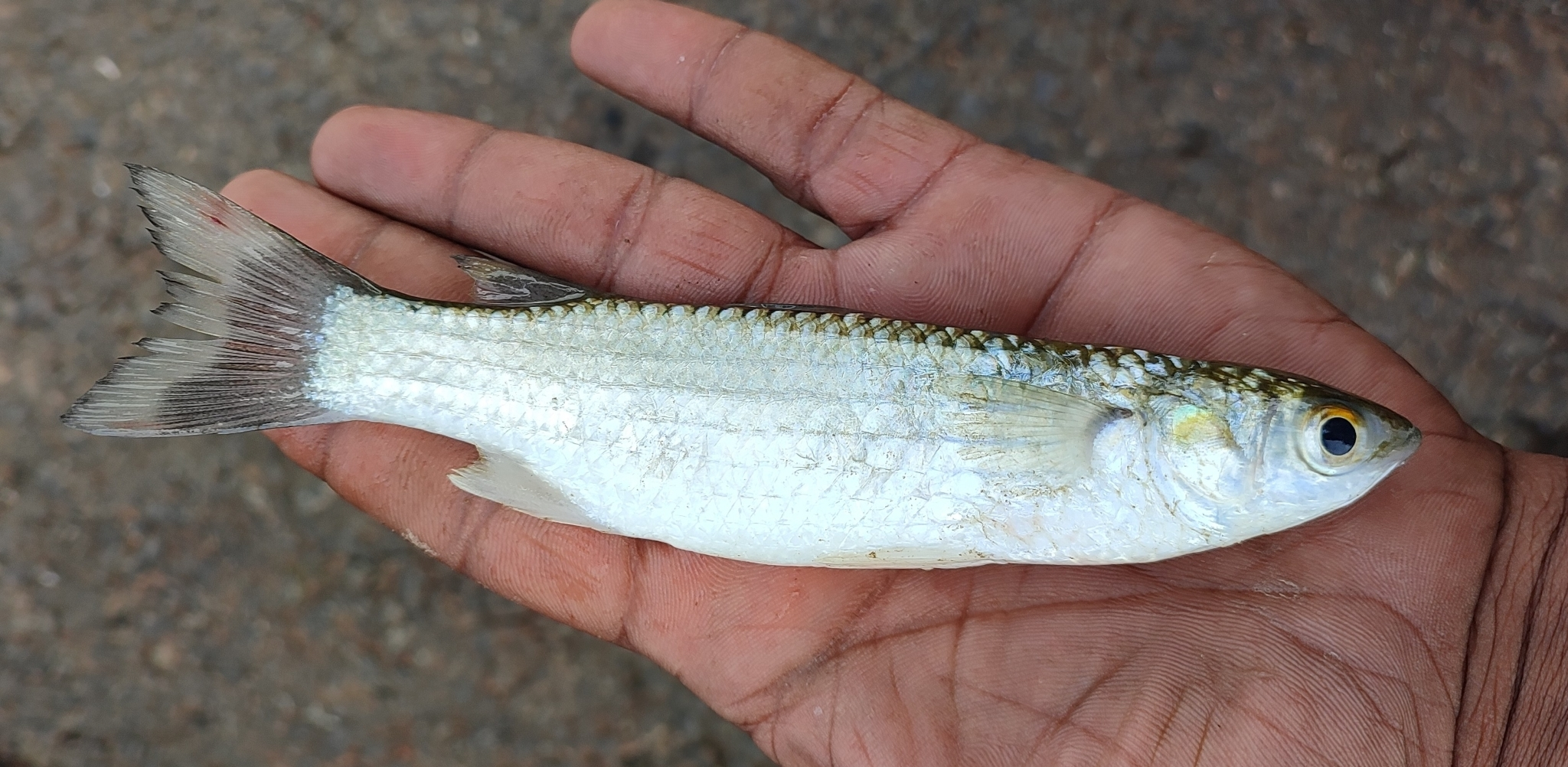

Scientific classification
- Kingdom: Animalia
- Phylum: Chordata
- Class: Actinopterygii
- Order: Mugiliformes
- Family: Mugilidae
- Genus: Planiliza
- Species: P. parsia

Binomial name
- Planiliza parsia (Hamilton, 1822)

Synonyms
- Mugil parsia Hamilton, 1822; Chelon parsia (Hamilton, 1822); Liza parsia (Hamilton, 1822); Myxus parsia (Hamilton, 1822); Mugil olivaceus Day, 1876

= Planiliza parsia =

Species of ray-finned fish

Planiliza parsia, the goldspot mullet, is a species of ray-finned fish in the family Mugilidae. It is one of 15 species in the genus Planiliza. This species is found in the Indian Ocean in shallow coastal waters of Pakistan, India, Sri Lanka and the Andaman Islands. It also lives in lagoons, estuaries, and tidal rivers.

== Description ==
This species reaches a maximum length of 16 cm (6.3 in).

It is oviparous like other members of its genus.
