= Diamond mullet =

Conservation status
- Least Concern (IUCN 3.1)

Scientific classification
- Kingdom: Animalia
- Phylum: Chordata
- Class: Actinopterygii
- Division: Teleostei
- Order: Mugiliformes
- Family: Mugilidae
- Genus: Planiliza
- Species: P. alata

Binomial name
- Planiliza alata (Steindachner, 1892)

Synonyms
- Mugil alatus Steindachner, 1892; Chelon alatus (Steindachner, 1892); Liza alata (Steindachner, 1892); Mugil diadema Gilchrist & Thompson, 1911; Liza diadema (Gilchrist & Thompson, 1911); Pteromugil diadema (Gilchrist & Thompson, 1911); Moolgarda (Planiliza) ordensis Whitley, 1945; Liza ordensis (Whitley, 1945)

Species of ray-finned fish

The diamond mullet (Planiliza alata) is a species of mullet and is also known as the Ord River mullet or bucket mullet. This species lives in both brackish or freshwater. Adult fish are found in estuaries, coastal waters and in some cases, ascending rivers into fresh water.

== Description ==
This mullet is silvery gray, being paler below. It has a yellow iris and reaches a length of up to 75 cm (30 in).

== Distribution ==
The diamond mullet has an Indo-West Pacific distribution which extends from the eastern coast of Africa, including South Africa, through Madagascar and the Mascarenes east to Tonga and Marquesas Islands in French Polynesia and south to northern Western Australia and the Gulf of Carpentaria in western Queensland. It has also been reported inland on the Zambezi.

It is a tropical species that inhabits inshore marine habitats including estuaries. It also travels hundreds of kilometres up rivers.
