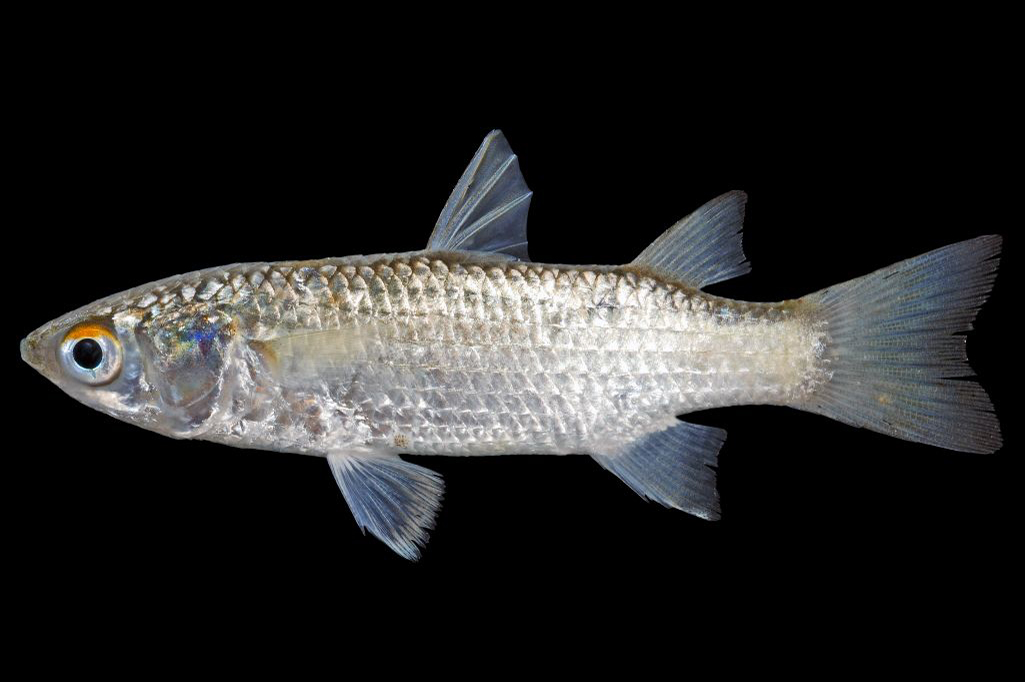

Conservation status
- Least Concern (IUCN 3.1)

Scientific classification
- Kingdom: Animalia
- Phylum: Chordata
- Class: Actinopterygii
- Order: Mugiliformes
- Family: Mugilidae
- Genus: Planiliza
- Species: P. subviridis

Binomial name
- Planiliza subviridis (Valenciennes, 1836)

Synonyms
- Chelon subviridis (Valenciennes, 1836); Mugil dussumieri Valenciennes, 1836; Mugil subviridis Valenciennes, 1836

= Greenback mullet =

Species of fish

Greenback mullet (Planiliza subviridis) is a species of ray-finned fish in the family Mugilidae.

== Range ==
The species is a slender, cylindrical fish with a small mouth, large eyes, and swift, agile movements, often found schooling along Indo-Pacific coasts (from the Red Sea and Persian Gulf to Samoa and northern Japan).

== Diet ==
It feeds on phytoplankton, zooplankton, and organic detritus, reaching up to 40 cm (16 in) in length with an average of 25 cm (10 in).

== Agriculture ==
In Thailand, the Department of Fisheries promotes it as an aquaculture species, typically raised in earthen ponds at 10–20 fish/m², often polycultured with species such as green scat, clams, or mud crabs. Fed twice daily on formulated feed with less than 25% protein, they reach 50–200 g (1.8–7.1 oz) in 6–10 months, selling for 150–160 baht/kg.

Its flesh is high in protein (20.5 g per 100 g, comparable to salmon) and contains only 64 mg cholesterol per 100 g.
