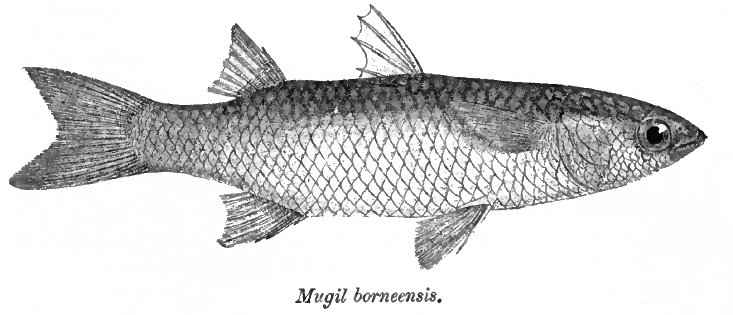

Conservation status
- Least Concern (IUCN 3.1)

Scientific classification
- Kingdom: Animalia
- Phylum: Chordata
- Class: Actinopterygii
- Division: Teleostei
- Order: Mugiliformes
- Family: Mugilidae
- Genus: Planiliza
- Species: P. macrolepis

Binomial name
- Planiliza macrolepis (A. Smith, 1846)

Synonyms
- Liza macrolepis (A. Smith, 1846); Chelon macrolepsis (A. Smith, 1846); Liza akame Tanaka, 1916; Liza pescadorensis Oshima, 1922; Liza troscheli (Bleeker, 1858-59); Mugil borneensis Bleeker, 1851; Mugil macrolepis A. Smith, 1846; Mugil pescadorensis (Oshima, 1922); Mugil poicilus Day, 1865; Mugil rodericensis Günther, 1876; Mugil smithii Günther, 1861; Mugil troscheli Bleeker, 1858-59; Mugil troschelii Bleeker, 1858-59

= Largescale mullet =

Species of ray-finned fish

The largescale mullet (Planiliza macrolepis) is a species of ray-finned fish in the family Mugilidae. It is found in the Indo-Pacific.

== Description ==
The largescale mullet is greenish-grey above and silvery grey beneath. The fins are bluish-grey with darker edges. The top of the back is nearly straight when viewed from the side while the underside is rounded. The first dorsal fin has 4-5 spines with 8 or 9 soft rays and the anal fin has 3 spines with about 9 soft rays.

== Distribution ==
The largescale mullet is found in shallow coastal areas in the Indo-Pacific region including estuaries and water with low salinity.
