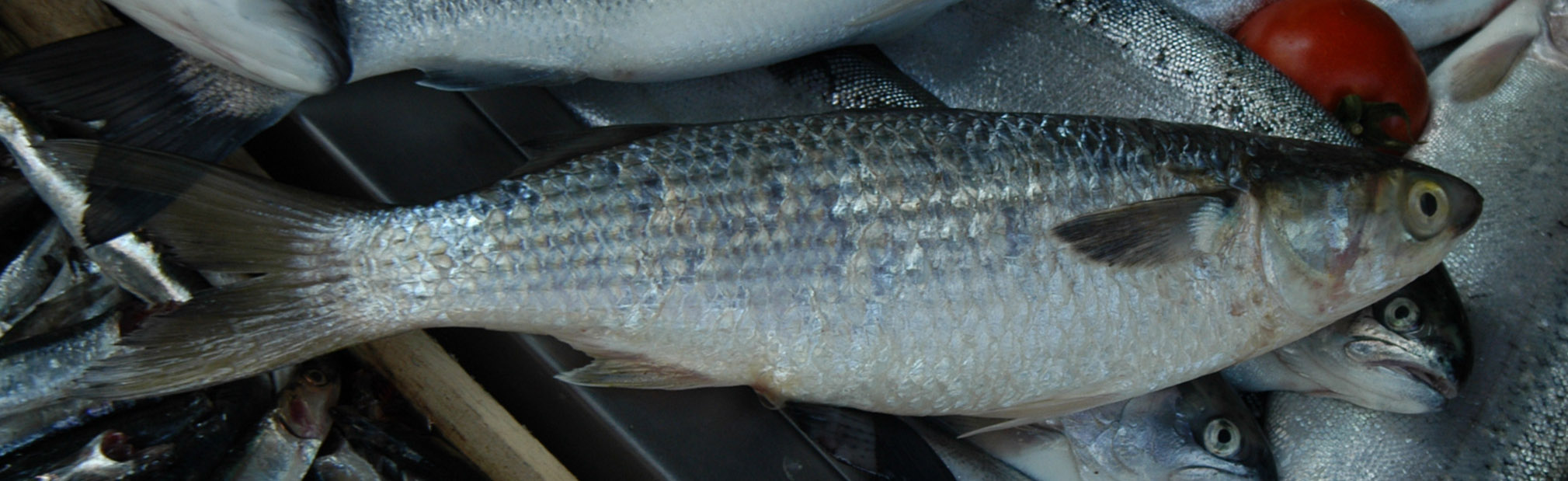
- Thicklip Grey Mullet (C. labrosus)

Scientific classification
- Kingdom: Animalia
- Phylum: Chordata
- Class: Actinopterygii
- Order: Mugiliformes
- Family: Mugilidae
- Genus: Chelon; Artedi, 1793

Type species
- Mugil chelo Cuvier, 1829

= Chelon =

Genus of ray-finned fishes

Chelon is a genus of mullets found in coastal marine waters, estuaries and rivers in the Atlantic Ocean and Arabian Sea.

== Anatomy ==
Chelon possesses the elongated body and dorsal fins typical of the order Mugiliformes, with frontal fins defined by four spines and anal fins with soft rays. The maximum sizes described vary between 15 cm (5.9 in) for the Cape Verde mullet and 32 cm (13 in) for the thicklip grey mullet.

== Habitat ==
They are catadromous fishes, meaning that they can be found in lagoons and rivers as well as the sea during the reproductive season, fundamentally feeding on algae and diatoms.

== Taxonomy ==
Recent cladistic analysis recovered Chelon as paraphyletic with respect to Liza, so some species of Liza were reassigned to Chelon and Liza synonymized with Chelon.

=== Species ===
The following species are classified in the genus Chelon:

- Chelon auratus (A. Risso, 1810) (Golden grey mullet)
- Chelon bandialensis Diouf, 1991 (Diassanga mullet)
- Chelon bispinosus (S. Bowdich, 1825) (Cape Verde mullet)
- Chelon dumerili (Steindachner, 1870) (Grooved mullet)
- Chelon labrosus (A. Risso, 1827) (Thicklip grey mullet)
- Chelon melinopterus (Valenciennes, 1836) (Otomebora mullet)
- Chelon natalensis (Castelnau, 1861)
- Chelon parsia (Hamilton, 1822) (Goldspot mullet)
- Chelon persicus Senou, Randall & Okiyama, 1995 (Persian mullet)
- Chelon ramada (A. Risso, 1827) (Thinlip grey mullet)
- Chelon richardsonii (A. Smith, 1846) (South African mullet)
- Chelon saliens (A. Risso, 1810) (Leaping mullet)
- Chelon tricuspidens (J. L. B. Smith, 1935) (Striped mullet)

== See also ==
- Planiliza
- The suffix -chelon
