= Chelon tricuspidens =

Scientific classification
- Kingdom: Animalia
- Phylum: Chordata
- Class: Actinopterygii
- Order: Mugiliformes
- Family: Mugilidae
- Genus: Chelon
- Species: C. tricuspidens

Binomial name
- Chelon tricuspidens (J. L. B. Smith, 1935)

Synonyms
- Mugil tricuspidens J. L. B. Smith, 1935; Heteromugil tricuspidens (J. L. B. Smith, 1935); Liza tricuspidens (J. L. B. Smith, 1935)

Species of ray-finned fish

Chelon tricuspidens, the striped mullet, is a species of ray-finned fish from the family Mugilidae. It is found in southern Africa where its known range comprises Mossel Bay and the Kosi Estuary in South Africa. Its habitatis muddy areas in estuaries. This species and the Diassanga mullet (Chelon bandialensis) are closely related and these two taxa seem to have separated when the Benguela Current, as it exists today, was formed about 3-12 million years ago.
