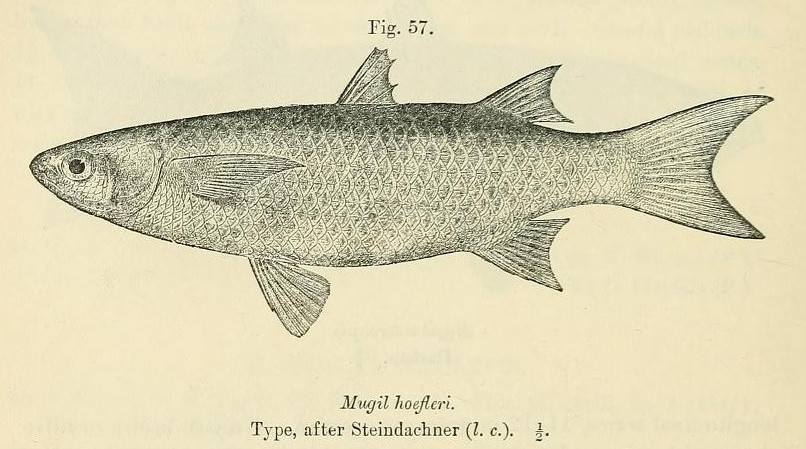

Conservation status
- Data Deficient (IUCN 3.1)

Scientific classification
- Kingdom: Animalia
- Phylum: Chordata
- Class: Actinopterygii
- Order: Mugiliformes
- Family: Mugilidae
- Genus: Chelon
- Species: C. dumerili

Binomial name
- Chelon dumerili (Steindachner, 1870)

Synonyms
- Mugil dumerili Steindachner, 1870; Liza dumerili (Steindachner, 1870); Mugil brasiliensis Agassiz, 1831; Mugil hoefleri Steindachner, 1882; Liza hoefleri (Steindachner, 1882); Liza alosoides Fowler, 1903; Mugil canaliculatus J. L. B. Smith, 1935; Strializa canaliculatus (J. L. B. Smith, 1935)

= Grooved mullet =

Species of fish

The grooved mullet (Chelon dumerili) is a species of ray-finned fish, a grey mullet from the family Mugilidae. It is found in the coastal waters of the eastern Atlantic Ocean off the western coast of Africa, as far north as Mauritania, and into the western Indian Ocean.

== Description ==
The grooved mullet has a total of five spines in its dorsal fins and eight or nine soft rays, the anal fin has three spines and eight or nine soft rays. The anal fin and the lower lobe of the caudal fin are coloured whitish or greyish. The body is coated in ctenoid scales apart from the scales in front of the anterior dorsal fin which are cycloid, extending to the front nostril or slightly beyond it. Its scales are small and numerous and there are 33–41 scales in a longitudinal series, not including those on the caudal peduncle, and 11–14 scale rows between pelvic and anterior dorsal fin. It grows up to 40 cm (16 in) in length.

== Distribution ==
The grooved mullet is found on the Atlantic coast of Africa from Mauritania in the north to the mouth of the Cunene River in Namibia. An allopatric population is found in the south-western Indian Ocean from False Bay in the Western Cape to southern Mozambique.

== Habitat and ecology ==
The grooved mullet is found in brackish and marine waters in estuaries and coastal shallows. It is a very adaptable species and has been recorded in both freshwater and hypersaline environments. Spawning occurs offshore and the fry move inshore while feeding on zooplankton. The adults sift food such as organic detritus, blue-green algae, diatoms, gastropods, and foraminifera from the substrate, usually coarse sand.

== Uses ==
The grooved mullet is fished for by commercial fisheries and mullets are used in aquaculture in Africa but it is not known if this involves this species. More research is needed to determine the conservation status of the grooved mullet and of its taxonomy.

== Taxonomy and naming ==
The two populations of grooved mullet are allopatric, and genetic sampling showed that haplotypes from West Africa were very different from those sampled in South Africa and that the two populations should be treated as sister species. The Atlantic species would retain the name Chelon dumerili as the type locality is Saint-Louis, Senegal while the name Chelon natalensis (Castelnau, 1861) or C. canaliculatus (J. L. B. Smith, 1935) have been suggested for the Indian Ocean taxon, although pending taxonomic revision this taxon has been designated as Chelon Species B.

The specific name honours the French ichthyologist and herpetologist Auguste Duméril (1812–1870) of the Muséum national d'histoire naturelle who lent Franz Steindachner specimens of fishes collected in Senegal.
