= Diassanga mullet =

Conservation status
- Data Deficient (IUCN 3.1)

Scientific classification
- Kingdom: Animalia
- Phylum: Chordata
- Class: Actinopterygii
- Order: Mugiliformes
- Family: Mugilidae
- Genus: Chelon
- Species: C. bandialensis

Binomial name
- Chelon bandialensis (Diouf, 1991)

Synonyms
- Liza bandialensis Diouf, 1991

Species of fish

The Diassanga mullet (Chelon bandialensis) is a species of ray-finned fish, grey mullet from the family Mugilidae. It is found in the eastern Atlantic around the coasts of West Africa.

== Description ==
The Diassanga mullet has a rounded, rather robust body with a pointed head which is about a quarter of the length of the body. The eye is surrounded by a small rim of adipose tissue, and its upper lip has a thickness equal to a third of the diameter of the eye while the lower lip is much thinner. It has a silvery blueish-grey back with paler flanks which are marked with seven longitudinal grey lines. The anal and dorsal fins are yellow, as is the caudal fin but this has a black margin. They grow to 43.9 centimetres (17.3 in) in standard length.

== Distribution ==
The Diassanga mullet is an eastern Atlantic species which occurs in the coastal waters of Senegal, Gambia and Guinea-Bissau.

== Habitat and ecology ==
The Diassanga mullet is a relatively large and uncommon species within its distribution, where it occurs in shallow coastal waters and estuaries with sandy substrates. It breeds in estuaries. Its larval and juvenile stages are unknown.

== Taxonomy and naming ==
The Diassanga mullet and the southern African striped mullet (Chelon tricuspidens) are closely related, and these two taxa seem to have separated when the Benguela Current, as it exists today, was formed about 3-12 million years ago. The specific name refers to the Bandiala, one of the constituent rivers of the Sine-Saloum in Senegal.

== Conservation ==
This species is exploited via some subsistence fisheries; the total grey mullet catch in west Africa in 2010 was 30,257 tons. The IUCN classify this species as Data Deficient, and state that more research is needed into its current population size and trend as well as its habitats, ecology, life history and any threats to its population.
