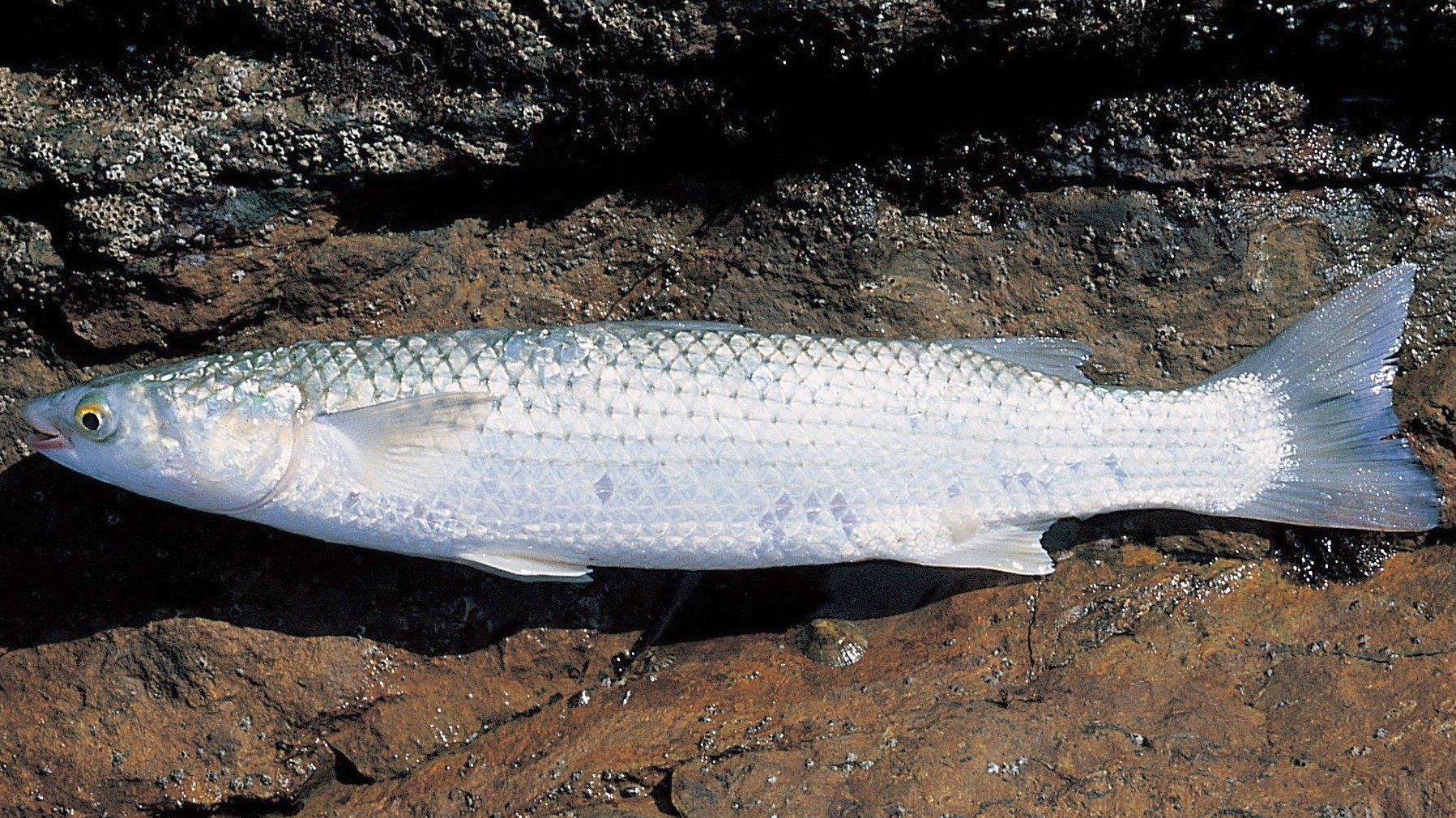

Scientific classification
- Kingdom: Animalia
- Phylum: Chordata
- Class: Actinopterygii
- Order: Mugiliformes
- Family: Mugilidae
- Genus: Planiliza
- Species: P. haematocheilus

Binomial name
- Planiliza haematocheilus (Temminck & Schlegel, 1845)

Synonyms
- Mugil haematocheilus Temminck & Schlegel, 1845; Mugil haematochilus Temminck & Schlegel, 1845; Chelon haematocheilus (Temminck & Schlegel, 1845); Liza haematocheilus(Temminck & Schlegel, 1845); Liza haematocheila (Temminck & Schlegel, 1845); Liza haematochila (Temminck & Schlegel, 1845); Liza menada Tanaka, 1916; Liza borealis Popov, 1930; Liza joyneri borealis Popov, 1930; Liza menada borealis Popov, 1930; Liza so-iuy (Basilewsky, 1855); Mugil so-iuy Basilewsky, 1855; Mugil soiuy Basilewsky, 1855

= So-iuy mullet =

Species of ray-finned fish

The so-iuy mullet (Planiliza haematocheilus), also known as the haarder, redlip mullet or so-iny mullet, is a species of ray-finned fish in the family Mugilidae.

Previously the species was included in the genus Mugil (as Mugil soiuy), but is now considered a member of the genus Planiliza.

== Range ==
The natural range of the species is in the Northwest Pacific, from Hokkaido and the Amur River in the north along the coasts of Korea and China to Vietnam in the south. Introduced by humans for aquaculture in the Sea of Azov and the Black Sea before entering the northern Aegean Sea, where it was first recorded in 1998, via the Sea of Marmara.

== Parasites ==
There are 69 known species of parasites of Planiliza haematocheilus.
