= Otomebora mullet =

Conservation status
- Least Concern (IUCN 3.1)

Scientific classification
- Kingdom: Animalia
- Phylum: Chordata
- Class: Actinopterygii
- Order: Mugiliformes
- Family: Mugilidae
- Genus: Chelon
- Species: C. melinopterus

Binomial name
- Chelon melinopterus (Valenciennes, 1836)

Synonyms
- Mugil melinopterus Valenciennes, 1836; Chelon melinopterus (Valenciennes, 1836); Ellochelon melinoptera (Valenciennes, 1836); Planliza melinoptera (Valenciennes, 1836); Planliza melinopterus (Valenciennes, 1836); Liza melinoptera (Valenciennes, 1836); Mugil ceramensis Bleeker, 1853; Liza ceramensis (Bleeker, 1853); Mugil compressus Günther, 1861; Mugil anpinensis Oshima, 1922; Ellochelon luciae Penrith & Penrith, 1967; Liza luciae (Penrith & Penrith, 1967)

Species of ray-finned fish

The Otomebora mullet (Chelon melinopterus), the giantscale mullet or St. Lucia mullet, is a species of ray-finned fish in the family Mugilidae. It is found in the Indo-Pacific Region.
