= Fertilia =

- Frazione of Alghero
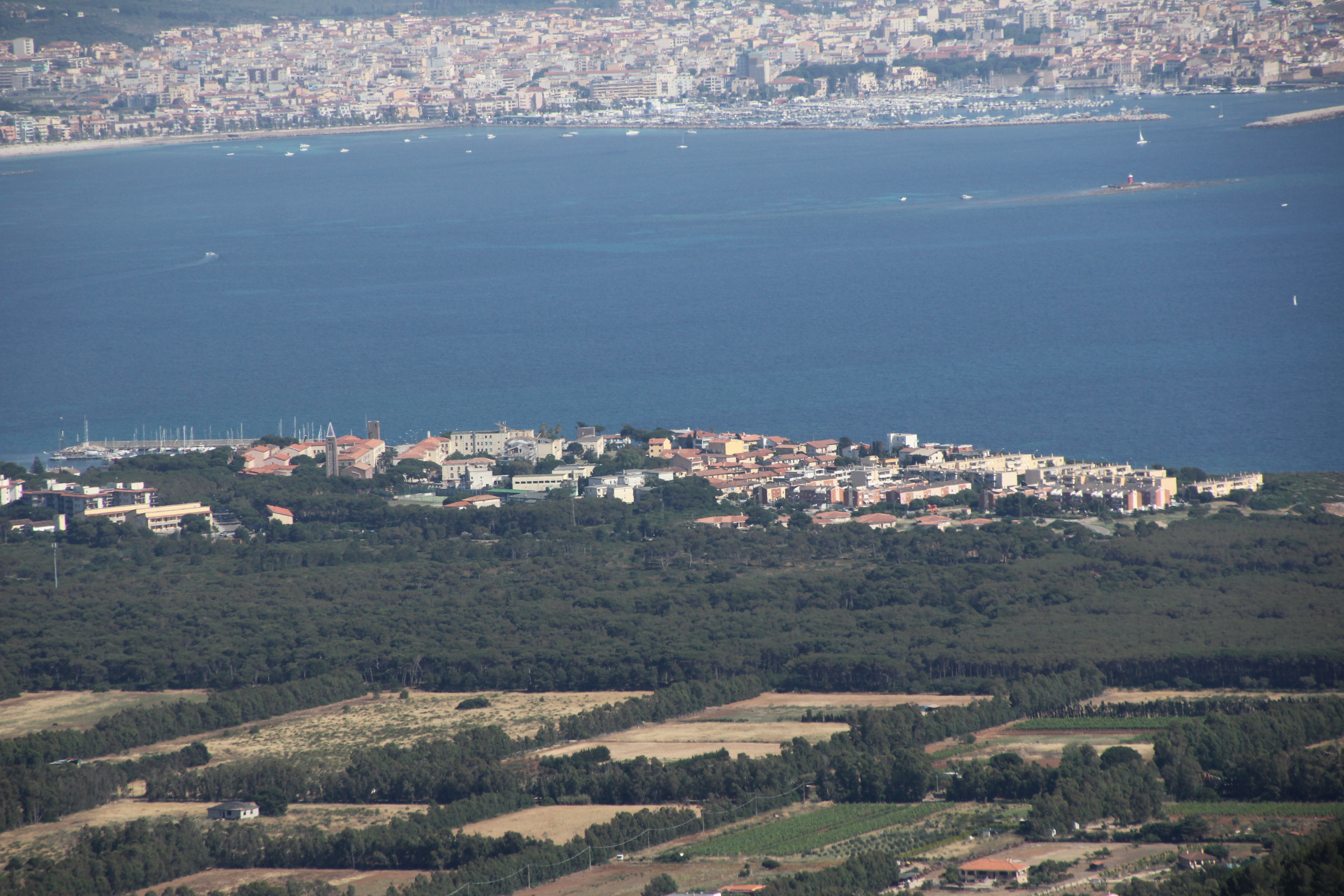
- Interactive map of Fertilia
- Country: Italy
- Region: Sardinia
- County: Municipality of Alghero
- City: Alghero
- Established: 1933

Population (2011)
  - Total: 966
- Website: http://www.comune.alghero.ss.it/

Fertilia [fer-tì-lia] is a frazione (hamlet) in the municipality of Alghero in the province of Sassari, Sardinia, Italy that was built in the 1930s. Due to a development program made by the Fascist regime, people from the Province of Ferrara were brought into the settlement, which has resulted in a sizeable community in the hamlet speaking the Ferrarese dialect. Fertilia lies between Fertilia Airport and the city of Alghero.

== History ==
The transformation of the Nurra marshland began in the late 19th century with the reclamation of the Calich coastal lagoon, thanks to the work of inmates from the nearby Alghero prison and the Cuguttu penal colony. The work continued in 1927 with the construction of the Calik Village designed by Pier Luigi Carloni.

The village of Fertilia was officially founded on March 8, 1936, with the laying of the foundation stone of the parish church, by the Ferrara Colonization Board, established on October 7, 1933 by the fascist regime to respond to the overpopulation of the Province of Ferrara and to reduce social tensions. It was originally populated by immigrants from north east Italy (Veneto and Friuli-Venezia Giulia).

After the first arrivals of Ferrarese emigrants, the outbreak of World War II effectively paralyzed the colonization effort, leaving most of the buildings virtually unused. During the war, Fertilia became one of the concentration camps for Slavs, mostly Croats.

After the Second World War, it was the Istrian and Dalmatian exiles who populated the village, making it a microcosm similar to the Catalan-speaking one of Alghero.

Inheriting the Venetian tradition of its newcomers, the village was dedicated to Saint Mark the Evangelist, and a winged lion, his symbol, stands proudly in the center of the belvedere. A distinctive feature of the village is that all the streets and squares recall historical places or events in the Veneto and Julian March regions.

== Monuments and places of interest ==
The village, built according to a project by the 2PST group Concezio Petrucci, Mosè Tufaroli, Emanuele Filiberto Paolini and Riccardo Silenzi, stands in a sober style, typical of the architecture of the fascist period and everything is built with pink trachyte that recalls the buildings of other foundation towns such as Carbonia and Arborea.

Created on the model of Ebenezer Howard's garden city, it retains the characteristics of the rationalism architecture.

=== Religious architecture ===
==== San Marco ====
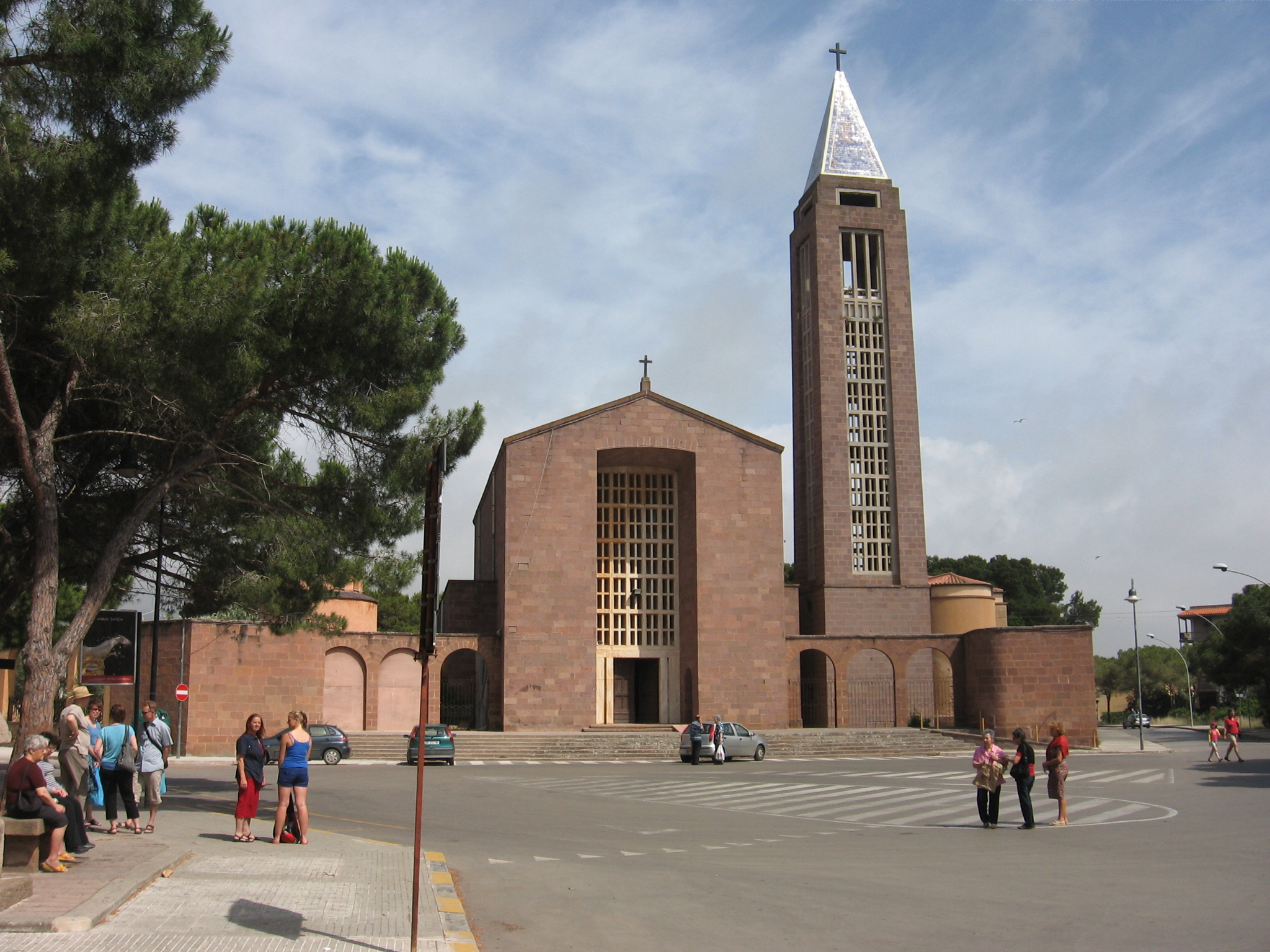
San Marco, the main church

Church of San Marco: the parish church of San Marco is the main place of worship in Fertilia. Originally dedicated to the Sacred Heart, with the arrival of Venetian settlers it was also associated with Saint Mark the Evangelist.

The church was designed by the architect Arturo Miraglia. Construction began on March 8, 1936. It is characterized by a gabled façade interrupted by a deep round arched space which encloses the entrance with a large glass window.

In 1957 the bell tower (22 metres) was added, which clearly recalls similar Venetian structures: the upper part in fact recalls the bell tower of St Mark's Basilica in Venice.

Inside, the most important work is the mosaic on the high altar of the Risen Christ with Angels. Commissioned in 1939, it was created by the Sardinian painter Giuseppe Biasi, one of the island's most important artists. The four evangelists in the presbytery arch are an early work by Sergio Zidda. Almost the entire rest of the building was decorated by the famous Sassari sculptor-ceramist Giuseppe Silecchia. The baptistery was painted in 1950 by Dante Pantaleoni.

=== Roman bridge ===
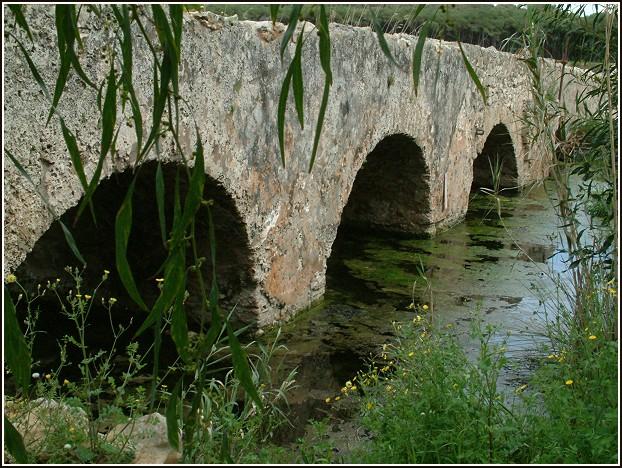
The Roman bridge over Calich Pond

Near Fertilia, on the Calich Pond, there is an ancient Roman bridge rebuilt in the Middle Ages. Excavations and on-site studies have shown that the foundations of the first seven arches date back to the Roman period.

== Gallery ==
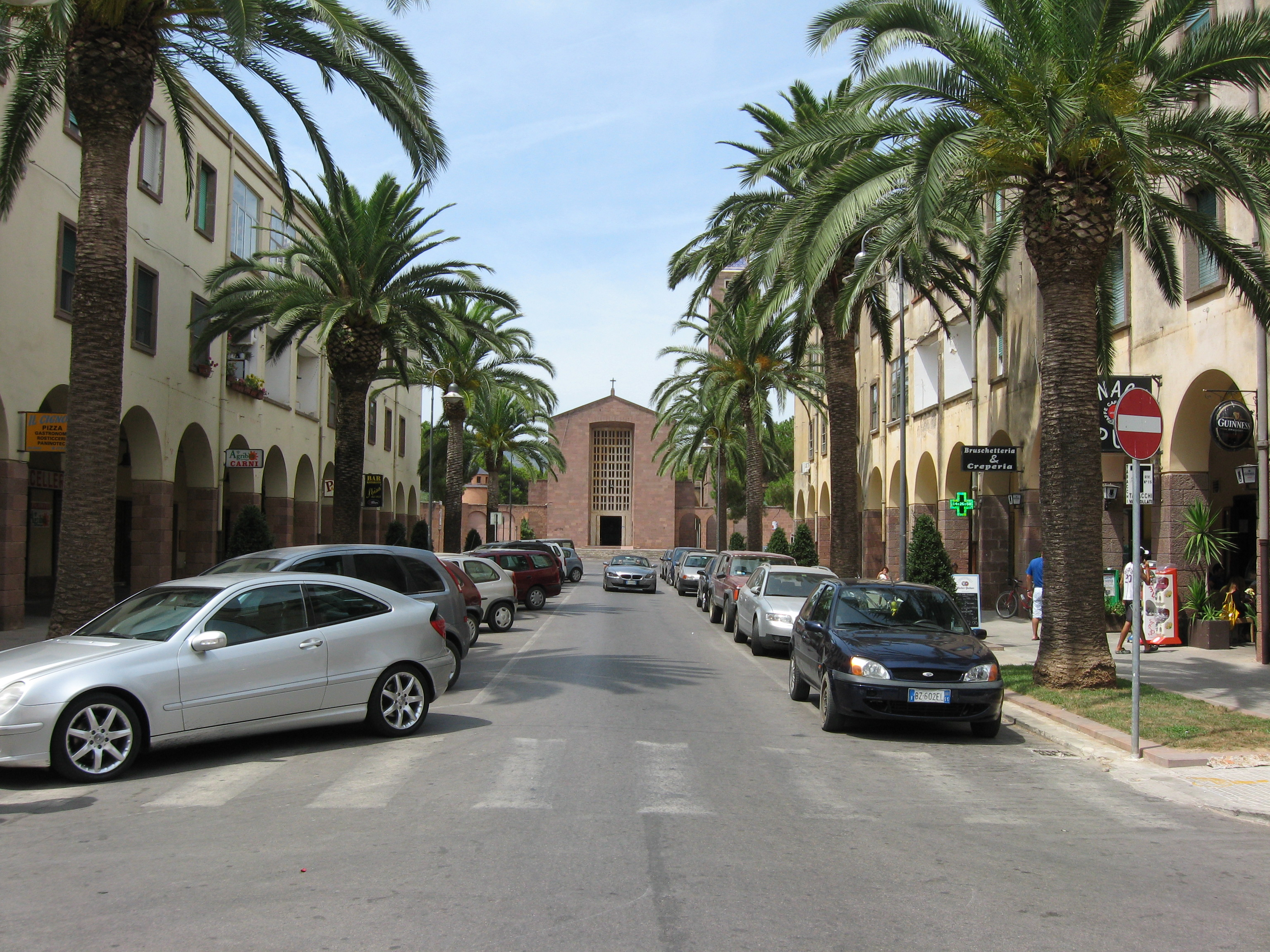
View of Fertilia

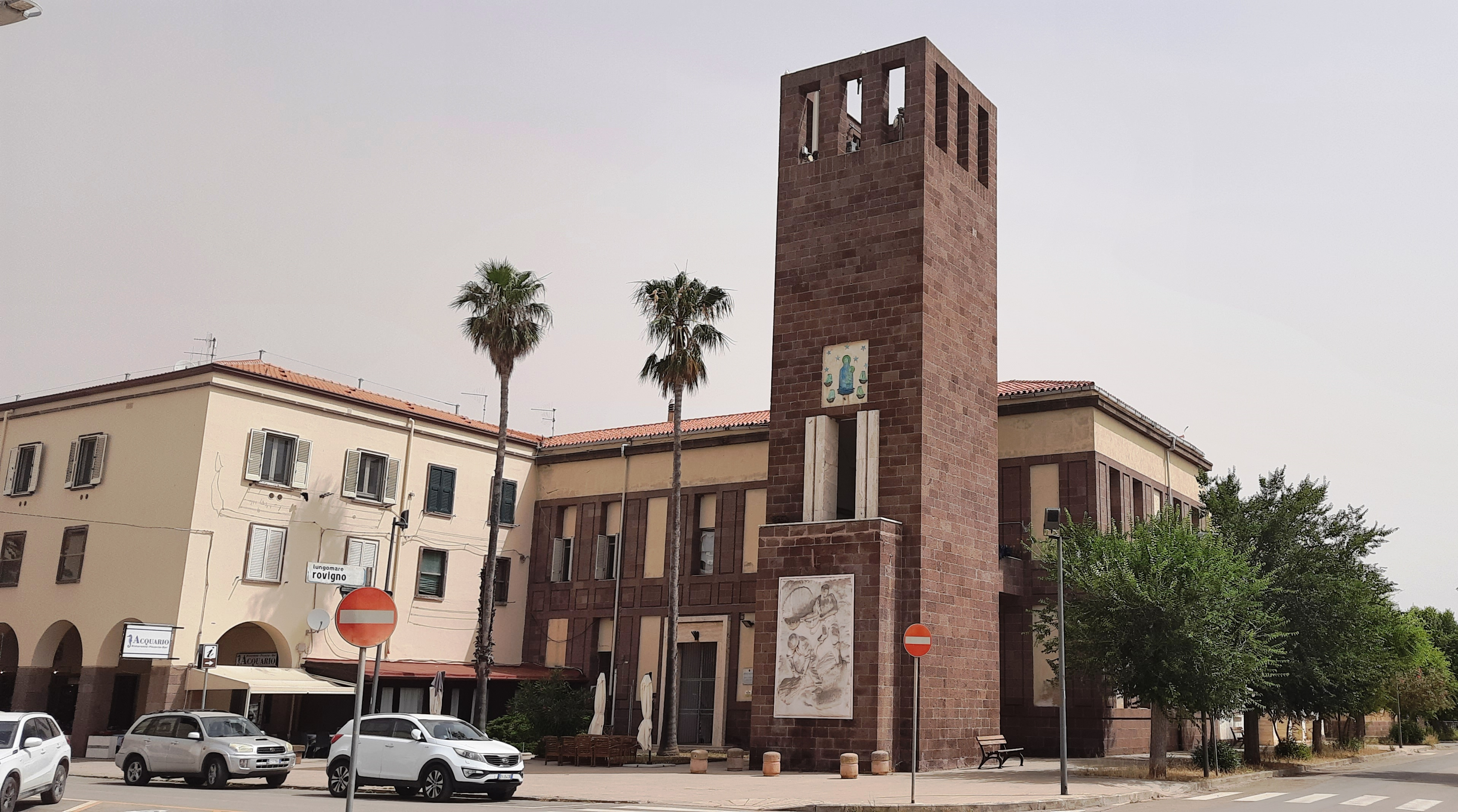
Municipal Tower, formerly the Littoria Tower

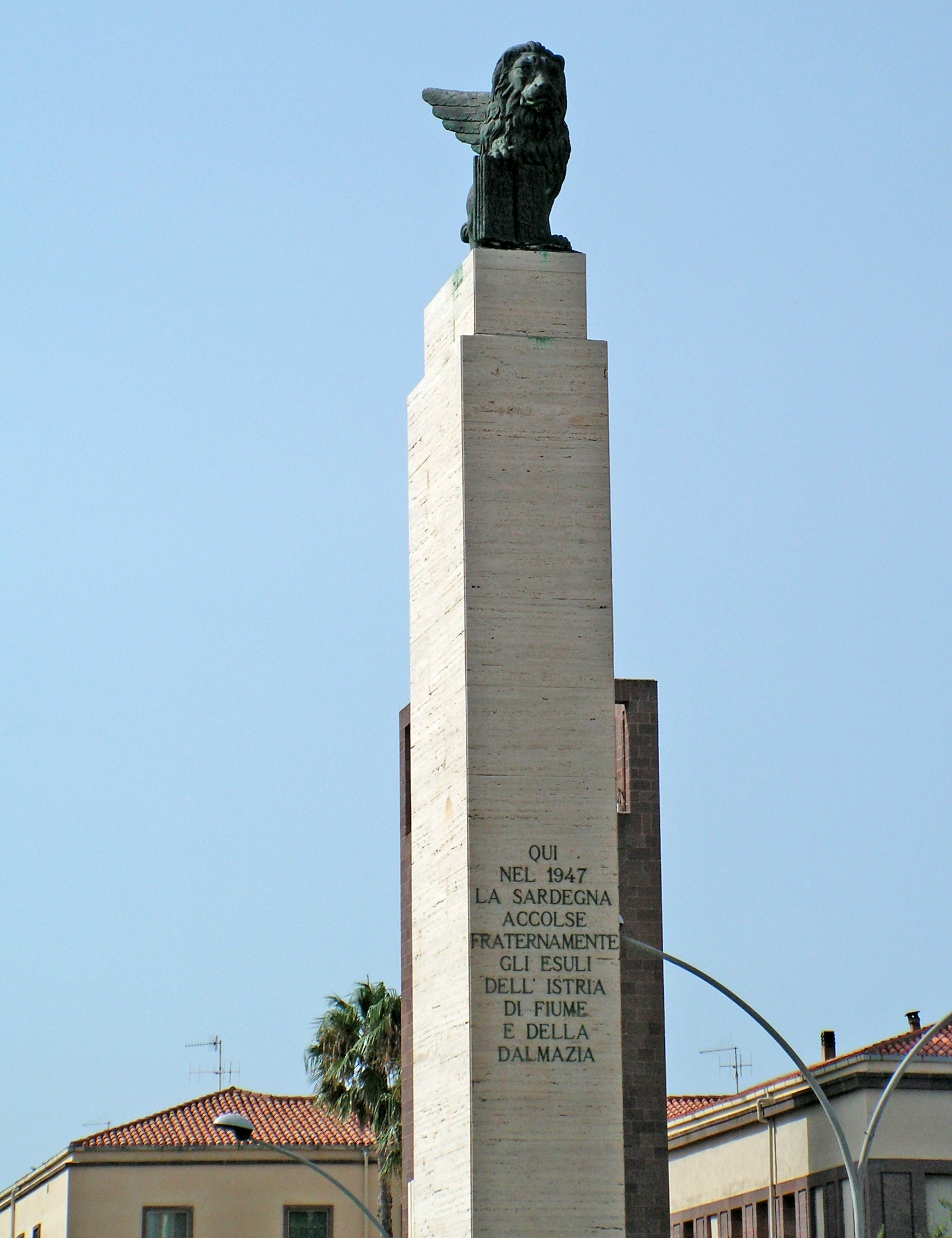
Commemorative column of the Istrian Exodus

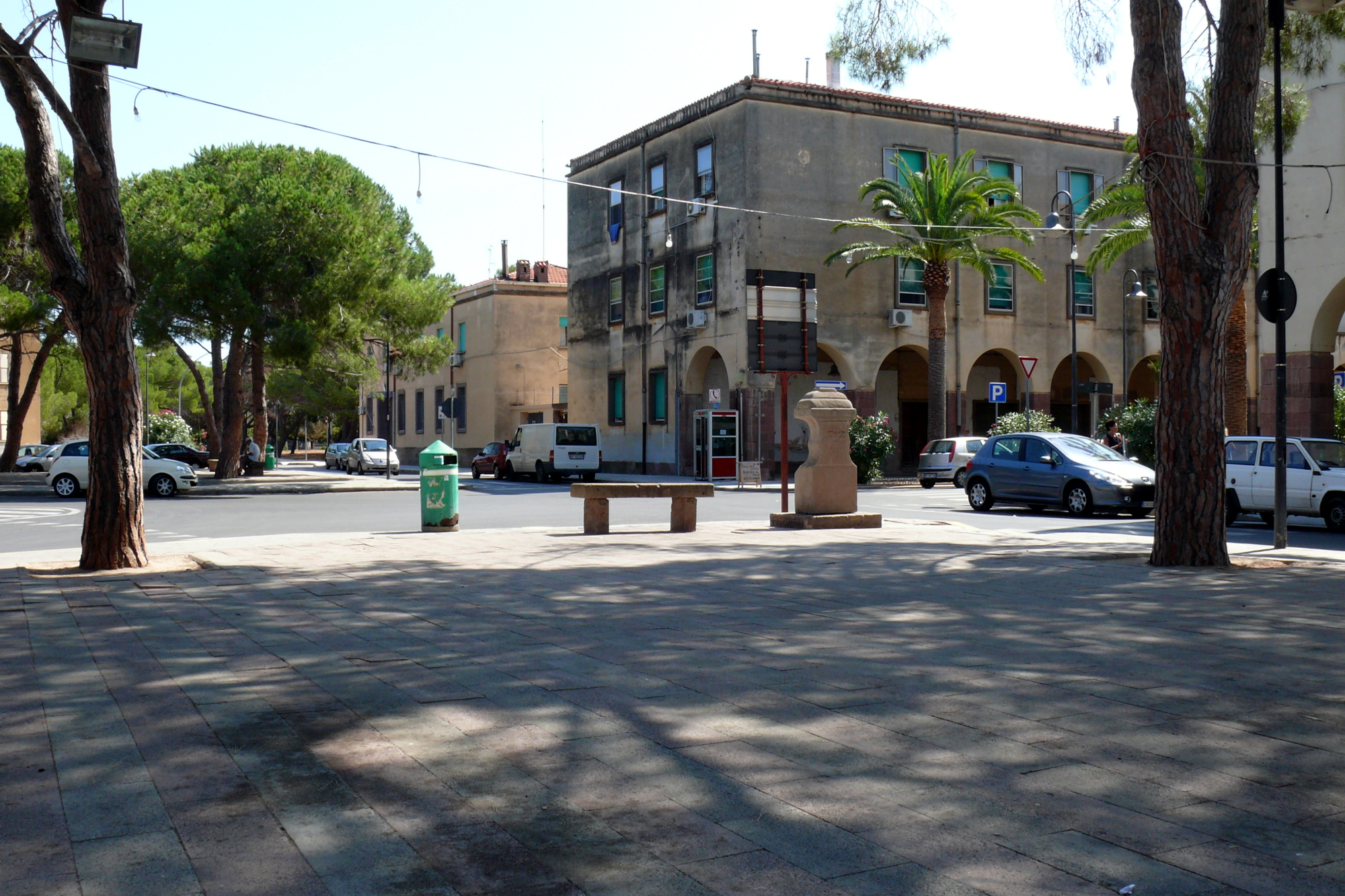
View of Piazza Venezia Giulia

== Bibliography ==
- G. Peghin, E. Zoagli, "Fertilia. Storia e fondazione di una città moderna", in A. Lino, Le città di fondazione della Sardegna, Cagliari, 1998
- G. Peghin, Architettura e città tra avanguardia e tradizione, Alghero, 2005
- E. Valsecchi, Da Alghero a Fertilia, Alghero, 2006
