= Chelon bispinosus =

Conservation status
- Least Concern (IUCN 3.1)

Scientific classification
- Kingdom: Animalia
- Phylum: Chordata
- Class: Actinopterygii
- Order: Mugiliformes
- Family: Mugilidae
- Genus: Chelon
- Species: C. bispinosus

Binomial name
- Chelon bispinosus (S. Bowdich, 1825)

Species of ray-finned fish

Chelon bispinosus (Cape Verde mullet) is a ray-finned fish of the family Mugilidae. It is one of seven species in the genus Chelon. It is endemic to waters near Cape Verde in the east central Atlantic Ocean. This species is found in the neritic zone.

== Description ==
This species reaches a maximum length of 15 cm.

It is oviparous like other members of its genus.
