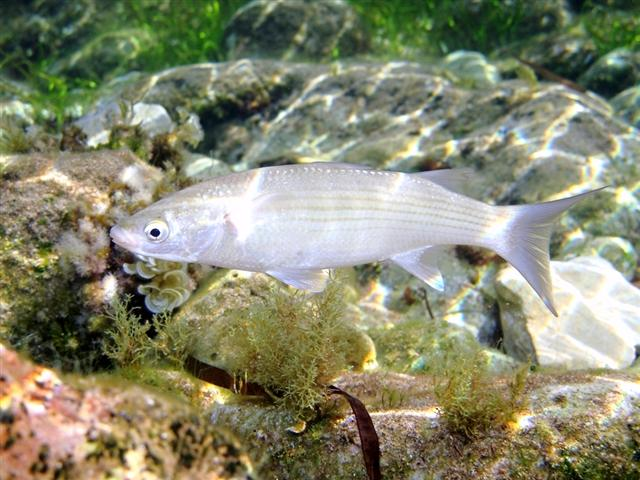

Conservation status
- Near Threatened (IUCN 3.1)

Scientific classification
- Kingdom: Animalia
- Phylum: Chordata
- Class: Actinopterygii
- Division: Teleostei
- Order: Mugiliformes
- Family: Mugilidae
- Genus: Chelon
- Species: C. labrosus

Binomial name
- Chelon labrosus (A. Risso, 1827)
- Chelon labrosus range

Synonyms
- Mugil labrosus Risso, 1827; Crenimugil labrosus (Risso, 1827); Mugil chelo Cuvier, 1829; Chelon chelo (Cuvier, 1829); Liza chelo (Cuvier, 1829); Mugil curtus Yarrell, 1836; Mugil corrugatus Lowe, 1838; Mugil buosega Nardo, 1847; Mugil septentrionalis Günther, 1861

= Thicklip grey mullet =

Species of fish

The thicklip grey mullet, Chelon labrosus, is a coastal fish of the family Mugilidae. It typically is about 32 cm (13 in) long, with 75 cm (30 in) being the maximum recorded. It is named after its thick upper lip and silvery-grey appearance.

It is a common fish of shallow, sheltered coasts, estuaries, and around power station and sewer outfalls; it can also enter fresh water areas.

It lives in the northeastern Atlantic Ocean from Iceland to Senegal and Cape Verde, including the Mediterranean Sea and the southwestern Black Sea. This species is partially migratory, heading northwards in summer.

It feeds mainly on benthic diatoms, epiphytic algae, small invertebrates and detritus.

The thicklip grey mullet lays its eggs in winter. Both eggs and fry are pelagic.

== Human interaction ==
The thicklip grey mullet is valued both as a food fish and as a tenacious game fish.

== Parasites ==
As most species of fish, the thicklip grey mullet is infected by a variety of parasite species. A 2023 paper showed that it harbors eleven species of Myxobolus (Myxozoa).
