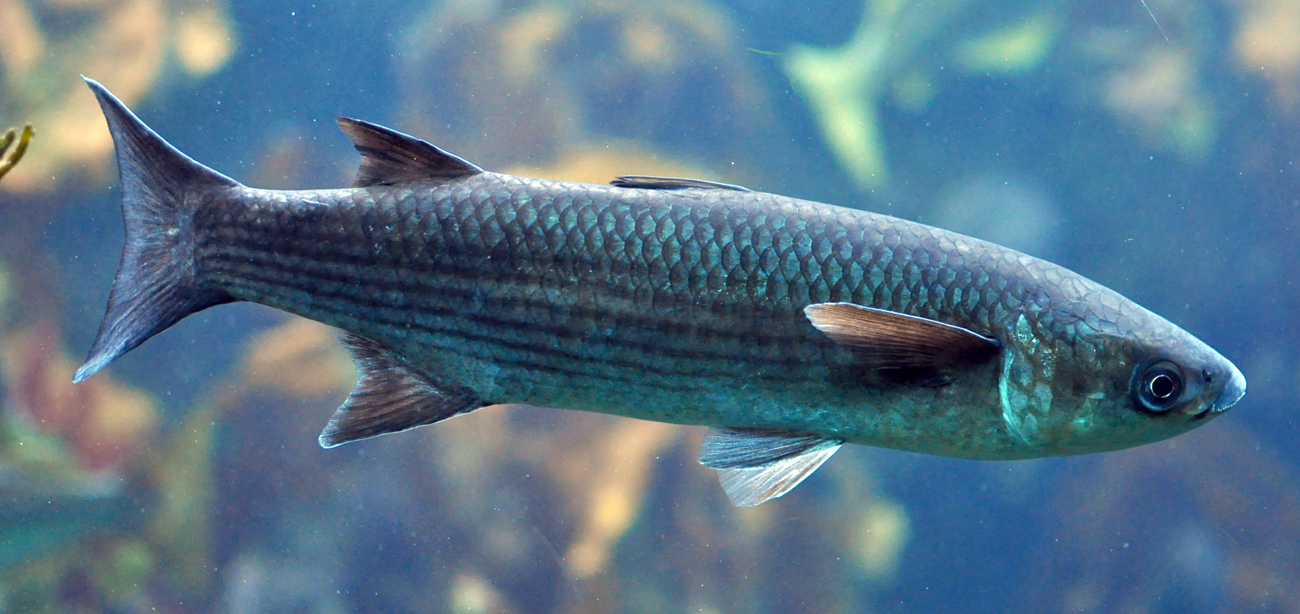

Conservation status
- Near Threatened (IUCN 3.1)

Scientific classification
- Kingdom: Animalia
- Phylum: Chordata
- Class: Actinopterygii
- Division: Teleostei
- Order: Mugiliformes
- Family: Mugilidae
- Genus: Chelon
- Species: C. saliens

Binomial name
- Chelon saliens (Risso, 1810)

Synonyms
- Liza saliens (Risso, 1810); Liza saliens furcata Popov, 1930; Mugil saliens Risso, 1810; Mugil verselata Nardo, 1847

= Leaping mullet =

Species of fish

The leaping mullet (Chelon saliens) is a species of fish in the family Mugilidae. It is found in coastal waters and estuaries in the northeast Atlantic, ranging from Morocco to France, and including the Mediterranean and Black Sea. It has been introduced to the Caspian Sea.

== Description ==
The leaping mullet is greyish brown above and silvery beneath, with golden reflections on the flank. The fins are orangish-brown.

== Distribution ==
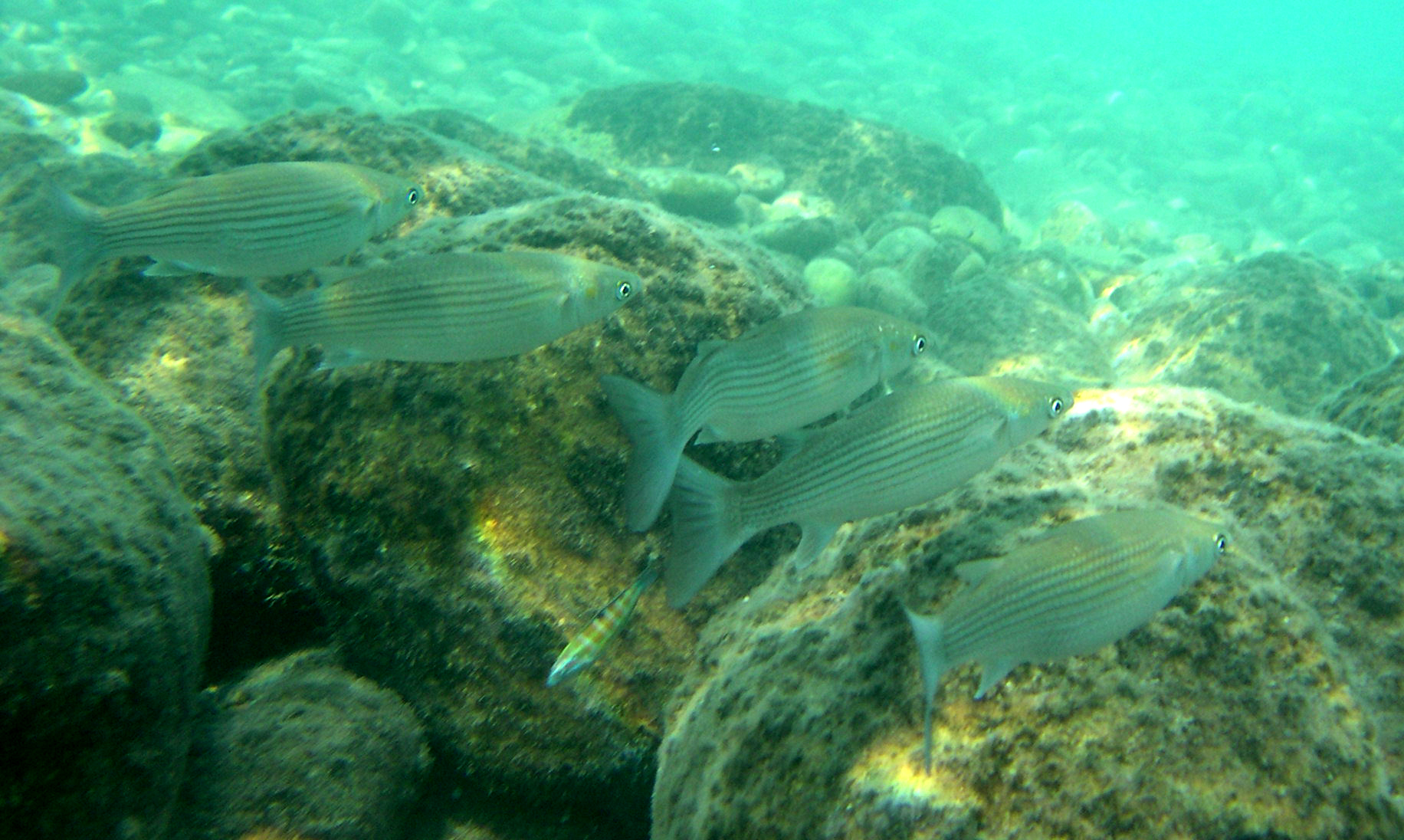
Leaping mullet

The leaping mullet is found in shallow coastal areas of the northeastern Atlantic Ocean, as far north as the Bay of Biscay, and the Mediterranean Sea. It also occurs in the Black Sea and Sea of Azov, and it was introduced into the Caspian Sea in the 1930s and has become established in both.

== Biology ==
The leaping mullet breeds in the summer. Between five hundred and two thousand eggs are produced and fertilisation is external. The eggs are pelagic and include a large oil drop. The newly hatched fry feed get their nourishment from the yolk sac and grow rapidly. Juveniles feed on zooplankton at first and then benthic organisms. Males are mature at three years while females are mature in four. The adults are detrivores which, in addition to feeding on sand, also eat algae and vegetable matter.
