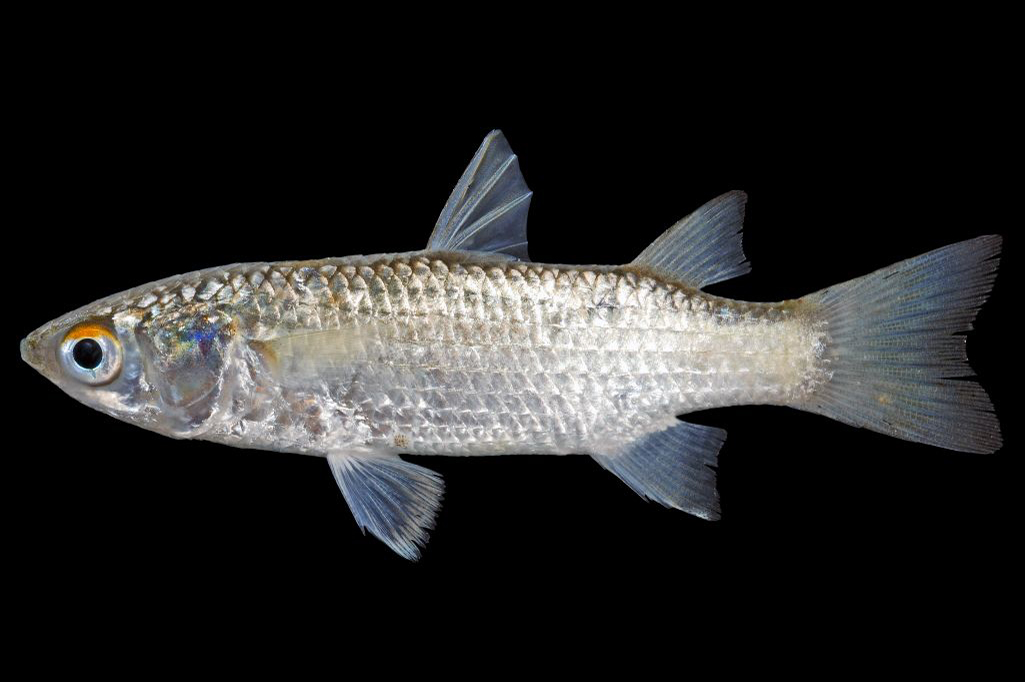
- Planiliza subviridis

Scientific classification
- Kingdom: Animalia
- Phylum: Chordata
- Class: Actinopterygii
- Division: Teleostei
- Order: Mugiliformes
- Family: Mugilidae
- Genus: Planiliza; Whitley, 1945

Type species
- Planiliza alata (Steindachner, 1892)

= Planiliza =

Genus of ray-finned fishes

Planiliza is a genus of mullets found in coastal marine waters, estuaries and rivers in the Indo-Pacific.

== Taxonomy ==
The genus Planiliza was resurrected for nearly all Indo-Pacific species previously assigned to Liza because DNA-based cladistic analyses recovered Liza as polyphyletic, with some species placed as sister to the Chelon type species and nearly all Indo-Pacific species to Planiliza.

=== Species ===
The following species are classified under Planiliza:

- Planiliza abu (Heckel, 1843) (Abu mullet)
- Planiliza alata (Steindachner, 1892) (Diamond mullet)
- Planiliza carinata (Valenciennes, 1836) (Keeled mullet)
- Planiliza haematocheilus (Temminck & Schlegel, 1845) (So-iny Mullet)
- Planiliza klunzingeri (F. Day, 1888) (Klunzinger's mullet)
- Planiliza lauvergnii (Eydoux & Souleyet 1850) (Eastern keelback mullet)
- Planiliza macrolepis (A. Smith, 1846) (Largescale mullet)
- Planiliza mandapamensis J. M. Thomson, 1997 (Indian mullet)
- Planiliza ordensis (Whitley, 1945)
- Planiliza planiceps (Valenciennes, 1836) (Tade gray mullet)
- Planiliza subviridis (Valenciennes, 1836) (Greenback mullet)
