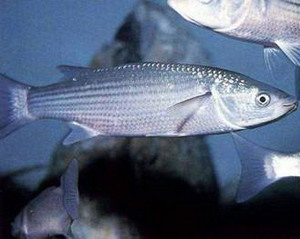

Conservation status
- Near Threatened (IUCN 3.1)

Scientific classification
- Kingdom: Animalia
- Phylum: Chordata
- Class: Actinopterygii
- Order: Mugiliformes
- Family: Mugilidae
- Genus: Chelon
- Species: C. ramada

Binomial name
- Chelon ramada (Risso, 1827)

Synonyms
- Mugil ramada Risso, 1827; Liza ramada (Risso, 1827); Mugil capito Cuvier, 1829; Liza capito (Cuvier, 1829); Mugil britannicus J. Hancock, 1830; Mugil dubahra Valenciennes, 1836; Mugil caustelus Nardo, 1847; Mugil petherici Günther, 1861; Liza alosoides Fowler, 1903; Myxus maroccensis Mohr, 1927

= Thinlip mullet =

Species of fish

The thinlip mullet (Chelon ramada) is a species of fish in the family Mugilidae. It is found in shallow European waters and is a migratory species.

== Description ==
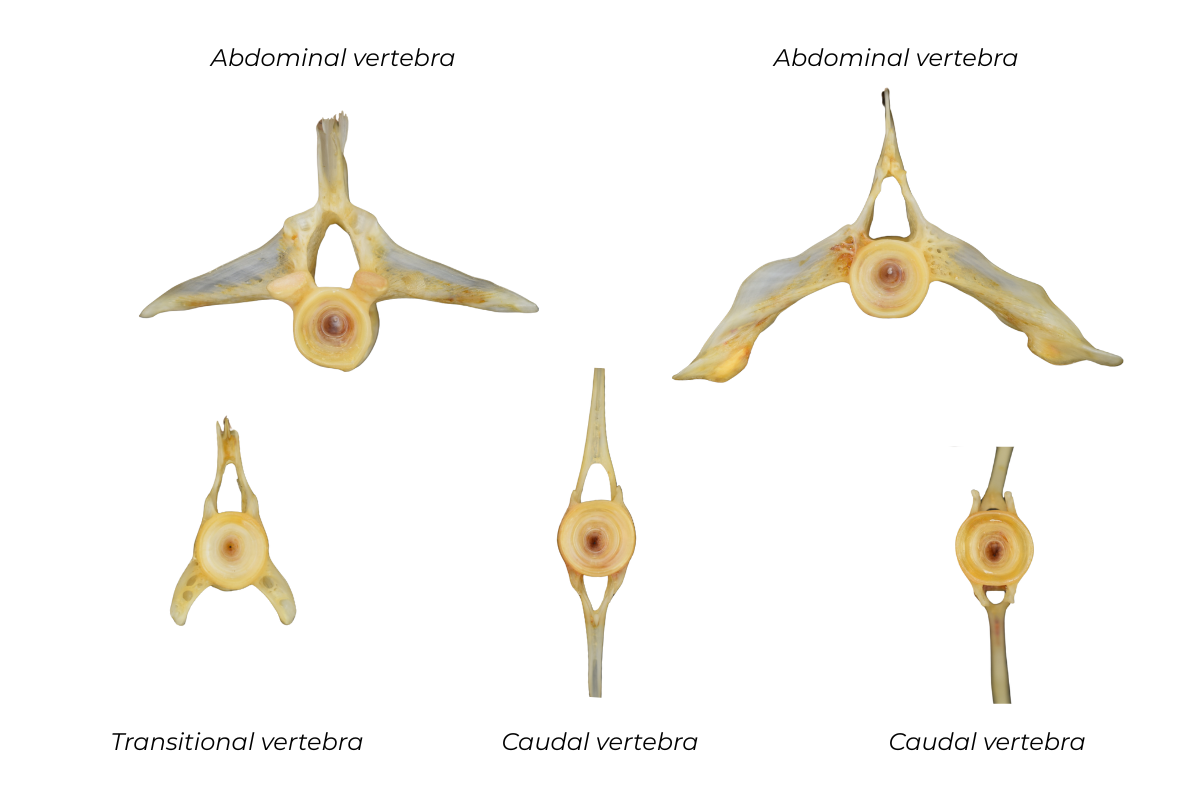
Vertebral types of the thinlip grey mullet (Chelon ramada)

The thin lip mullet has an elongate body compressed laterally. The head is short and flattened and the mouth is broad with a narrow upper lip and no tubercles. There are two dorsal fins. It is steely blue above and paler beneath. The scales are large and there is no externally visible lateral line.

Its maximum length is around 70 cm, with the common specimen being around 35 cm. The largest specimens recorded weighed over three kilograms.

Spawning takes place at sea, near the coast between September and February.

== Distribution ==
The thinlip mullet is found in the eastern Atlantic Ocean from Cape Verde and Senegal north to the Baltic Sea. It is also found in the Mediterranean Sea, Black Sea and Azov Sea.

It is a pelagic species, usually occurring inshore, entering lagoons and estuaries, and rivers. It feeds on epiphytic algae, detritus, and small benthic or planktonic organisms. It is common between 0–10m, rarely deeper than that.

== Fishing ==
Thinlip mullet is commercially caught mainly with gill nets, trammel nets, beach seines and sometimes cast nets. In recreational fishing, spearguns and rods and reels with floats are used. Hooks are baited with bread, various pastes, fish guts and similar baits. One must be careful when pulling and reeling in larger mullets since hooks can sometimes hook only soft lips and catch can be easily lost.

== Cuisine ==
Meat is white, tender and very soft. Since Thinlip mullet can be found in polluted waters too, taste and quality of the meat vary. Specimen caught in clear waters have great taste and can be prepared in many ways. It is the best barbecued with some olive oil and lemon juice and as part of mixed fish stew with boiled potatoes and/or polenta.
