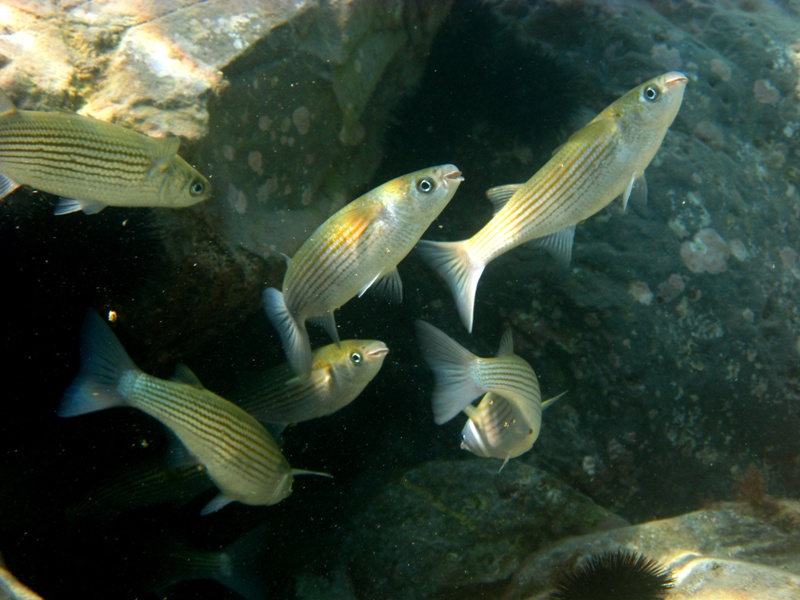

Conservation status
- Least Concern (IUCN 3.1)

Scientific classification
- Kingdom: Animalia
- Phylum: Chordata
- Class: Actinopterygii
- Order: Mugiliformes
- Family: Mugilidae
- Genus: Oedalechilus; Fowler, 1903
- Species: O. labeo

Binomial name
- Oedalechilus labeo G. Cuvier, 1829

Synonyms
- Mugil labeo Cuvier, 1829; Liza labeo (Cuvier, 1829)

= Boxlip mullet =

Species of ray-finned fish

The boxlip mullet (Oedalechilus labeo) is a species of ray-finned fish in the mullet family which is found in the eastern Atlantic from Gibraltar to Morocco, it is found in the Mediterranean Sea but not the Black Sea. It is the only species in the monospecific genus Oedalechilus.
