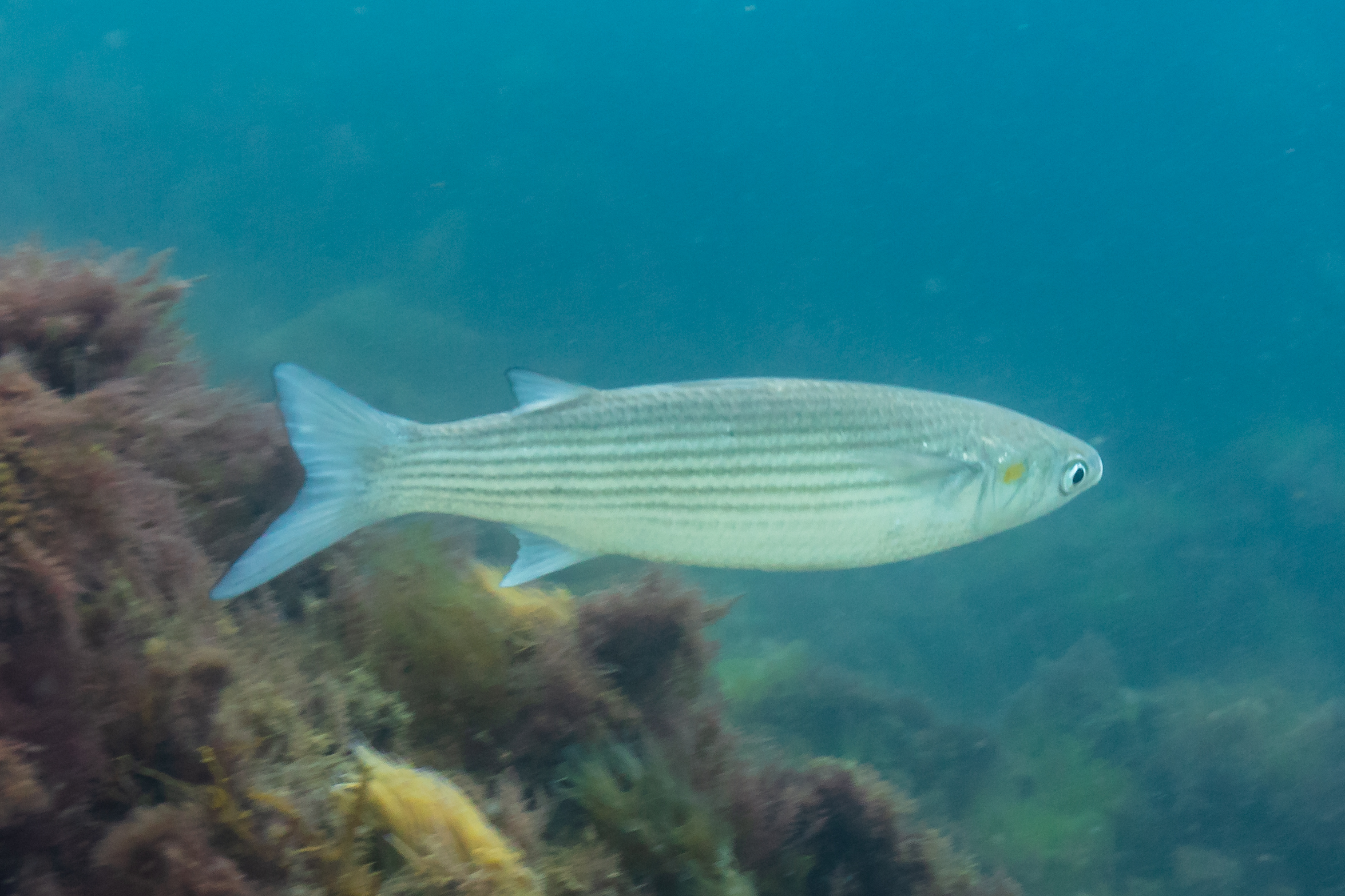

Conservation status
- Near Threatened (IUCN 3.1)

Scientific classification
- Kingdom: Animalia
- Phylum: Chordata
- Class: Actinopterygii
- Order: Mugiliformes
- Family: Mugilidae
- Genus: Chelon
- Species: C. auratus

Binomial name
- Chelon auratus (Risso, 1810)

Synonyms
- Chelon aurata (Risso, 1810); Liza aurata (Risso, 1810); Liza auratus (Risso, 1810); Mugil auratus Risso, 1810; Mugil breviceps Valenciennes, 1836; Mugil cryptocheilos Valenciennes, 1836; Mugil cryptochilus Valenciennes, 1836; Mugil lotreganus Nardo, 1847; Mugil maderensis Lowe, 1839; Mugil octoradiatus Günther, 1861; Planiliza aurata (Risso, 1810)

= Golden grey mullet =

Species of fish

The golden grey mullet (Chelon auratus) is a species of euryhaline ray-finned fish belonging to the family Mugilidae, the mullets or grey mullets. This species is found in the Eastern Atlantic Ocean and the Mediterranean Sea Basin. The golden grey mullet is a target for both commercial and recreational fisheries.

== Description ==
It has hydrodynamic, very elegant elongated, more or less cylindrical body, with strong tail-fin. It has dark grey back that transit into silver white toward the belly with several grey horizontal stripes. Golden spot is present in gill covers.

Its maximum length is around 60 centimetres (24 in) and weight around 1.5 kilograms (3 lb 5 oz), but commonly it is much smaller fish with average specimen having 30 centimetres (12 in) in length.

Reproduction takes place in the sea, from July to November.

== Habitat ==
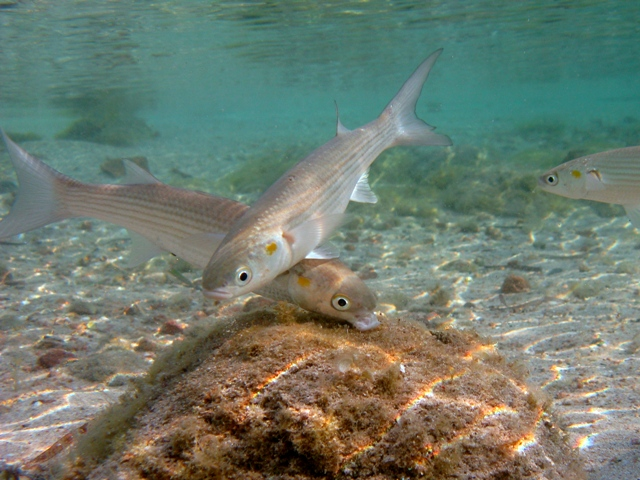
Chelon auratus feeding in shallows

It is present in Eastern Atlantic from Scotland to Cape verde, in the Mediterranean and Black Sea and in coastal waters from southern Norway and Sweden (but not Baltic) to Morocco. It is rare off coasts of Mauritania. It has been introduced into the Caspian Sea.

Golden grey mullet is a neritic species, usually inshore, entering lagoons, ports and estuaries, but rarely moves into freshwater. It feeds on small benthic organisms, detritus and occasionally insects and plankton.

It ranges from shallows to depths of about 20 metres (70 ft), but it is most common between 1–10 metres (0–30 ft). It prefers sandy bottoms covered with various vegetation and smaller rocks where it can find its food and protection from predators like larger eels, European sea bass, Common dentex and similar predatory species.

== Fishing ==
In many countries there is a minimum allowed fish length for golden grey mullet of 20 centimetres (7.9 in). In some estuaries it is main target of both commercial fishery and recreational fishermen.

Commercially it is caught using special nets for mullets that allows catching specimen that jump over first net line. The average annual catch of golden grey mullet in Croatian waters is 50 tonnes (49 long tons; 55 short tons). In sport and recreational fishing, it is often caught on rod and reel, using rigs with floats and hooks baited with paste made out of flour, cheese and fish guts, but sometimes will accept bread, cheese and similar baits.

== Cuisine ==
Meat is white, soft and very tender. Taste depends on fishing location. Golden grey mullet can be pan fried, especially smaller fish. Barbequed with some olive oil, lemon juice and parsley is often considered a delicacy.

Also, it can be used as part of mixed fish stew.
