= Giovanni Domenico Nardo =

Italian naturalist (1802–1877)

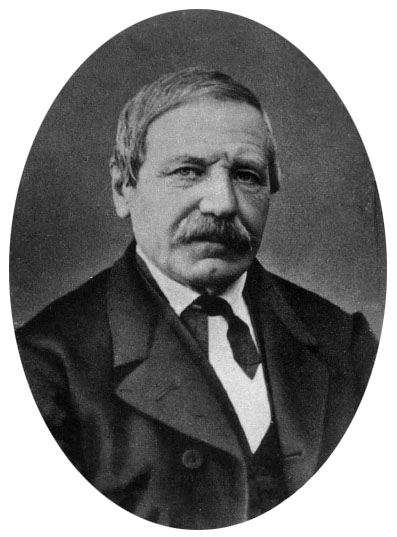
- Born: 4 March 1802; Venice
- Died: 7 April 1877 (aged 75)
- Education: University of Padua
- Scientific career
- Fields: Botany & Zoology
- Author abbrev. (botany): Nardo
- Author abbrev. (zoology): Nardo

Giovanni Domenico Nardo (4 March 1802 – 7 April 1877) was an Italian naturalist from Venice, although he spent most of his life in Chioggia, home port of the biggest fishing flotilla of the Adriatic. He learned taxidermy and specimen preparation from his uncle, an abbot. He went in a high school in Udine and studied medicine in Padua, where he reorganized the zoological collections. In 1832 he reorganized the invertebrate collection at the Imperial Natural History Museum in Vienna and in 1840 he became Fellow of the Istituto Veneto di Scienze, Lettere ed Arti, an academy whose aim is "to increase, promulgate, and safeguard the sciences, literature and the arts". Nardo wrote hundreds of scientific publications ranging from medicine and social sciences, philology, technology, physics, but mostly on Venetian and Adriatic zoology. In marine biology, Nardo wrote on algae, marine invertebrates, fishes and sea turtles. A vast collection of his manuscripts and his personal library is preserved in the Natural History Museum of Venice.

== Taxon described by him ==
According to the World Register of Marine Species (WoRMS), Nardo is the naming authority for 144 marine taxa.

- See Category:Taxa named by Giovanni Domenico Nardo

== Publications ==
- Giovanni Domenico Nardo: Prospetto della fauna marina volgare del Veneto estuario..Venezia : G. Antonelli, 1847.(book) (in Italian)
- Giovanni Domenico Nardo: Sinonimia moderna delle specie registrate nell' opera intitolata: "Descrizione de' crostacei, de' testacei e de' pesci che abitano le lagune e golfo veneto rappresentati in figure à chiaro-scuro ed a colori dall' Abate S. Chieregheni.Venezia, 1847.(book) (in Italian)
- Giovanni Domenico Nardo: Sunto di alcune osservazioni anatomiche sull'intima struttura della cute de' pesci comparativamente considerata e sulle cause fisiologiche e fisico-chimiche della loro colorazione e decolorazione. Venezia : presso la segreteria dell'I.R. Istituto nel Palazzo Ducale, 1853 (Venezia : G. Cecchini). (in Italian)
- Giovanni Domenico Nardo: Notizie sui Mammali viventi nel mare Adriatico e specialmente sui Fisetteri presi in esso nello scorso secolo e nel presente. Venezia : Tip. Cecchini, 1854. Estratto da: Atti dell'i. r. Istituto veneto di Scienze, Lettere ed Arti, v. 4., ser. 2., puntata 4. (in Italian)
- Giovanni Domenico Nardo: Annotazioni illustranti cinquantaquattro specie di crostacei (Podottalmi, Stomapodi, Endriottalmi e Succhiatori) del Mare Adriatico precedute dalla storia antica e recente della carcinologia adriatica. Venezia : presso la segreteria dell'I.R. Istituto nel Palazzo Ducale : G. Antonelli, 1869.
- Giovanni Domenico Nardo: Note rischiaranti il valore significativo di alcune voci etrusche. Venezia : G. Antonelli, 1870. (in Italian)
- Giovanni Domenico Nardo: La pesca del pesce ne' Valli della Veneta Laguna al tempo delle prime bufere invernali detto volgarmente (Fraima) : monologo didascalico in versi nel dialetto de' pescatori chioggiotti colla versione nella lingua comune d'Italia : giuntovi un saggio di canti popolari nello stesso dialetto e di altri componimenti riferibili a costumanze di Chioggia con dichiarazione di molte voci volgari e con raffronti opportuni a filologico studio..Venezia : Tip. del Commercio di Marco Visentini, 1871. (book) (in Italian)
- Giovanni Domenico Nardo: Congetture sulla derivazione mitologica dell'antico nome volgare veneto arcumbè e del suo sinonimo italiano arco baleno che etimologicamente vi corrisponde. Venezia : Tipografia del Commercio di Marco Visentini, 1872. (in Italian)
- Giovanni Domenico Nardo: Sui vantaggi che possono aversi dal mettere a profitto le sabbie incolte del Litorale e le Maremme dell'Estuario veneto. Venezia : Tip. del giornale Il Tempo, 1874.
- Giovanni Domenico Nardo: Vocaboli e modi di dire greci dai quali sembrano derivare forme proprie del dialetto veneti, che si presentano come materiali di studio. Venezia : Tipografia Grimaldi e C., 1875
- Giovanni Domenico Nardo: Relazione sopra due opere sulla lingua romena offerte in omaggio al R. Istituto Veneto di Scienze dal prof. L. Frollo con una nota ed un elenco di voci romene confrontate con forme usate nel dialetto dei pescatori di Chioggia. Venezia : Tipografia Grimaldo e C., 1876.
