= History of Smooth Island (Tasmania) =

This article outlines the history of Smooth Island, popularly known as Garden Island, in Norfolk Bay, Tasmania. The names come from the island's gently undulating topography and lush vegetation in comparison with the stony mainland. It has been privately owned since 1864.

== History ==
=== Before European settlement ===
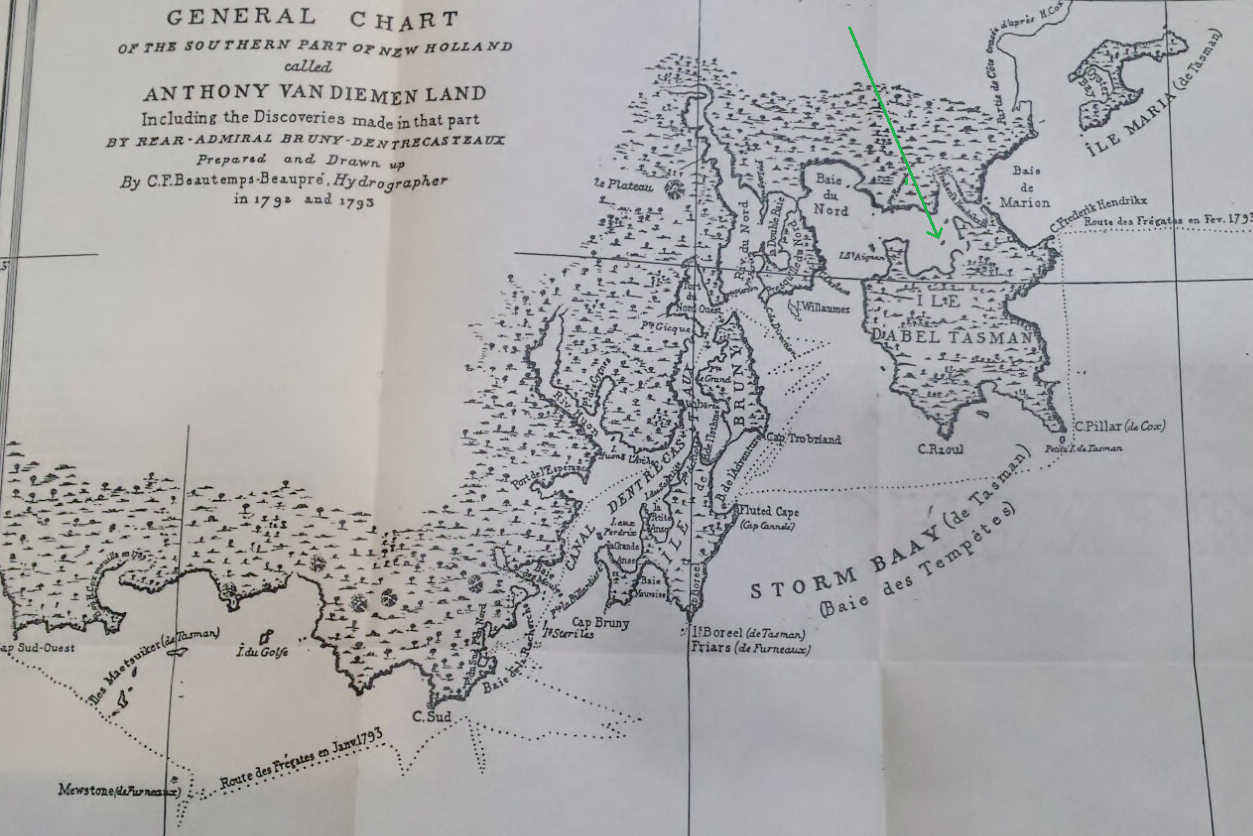
1793: D'Entrecasteaux's map of Norfolk Bay after a brief exploration. Smooth Island, which he had not named, is indicated with a green arrow.

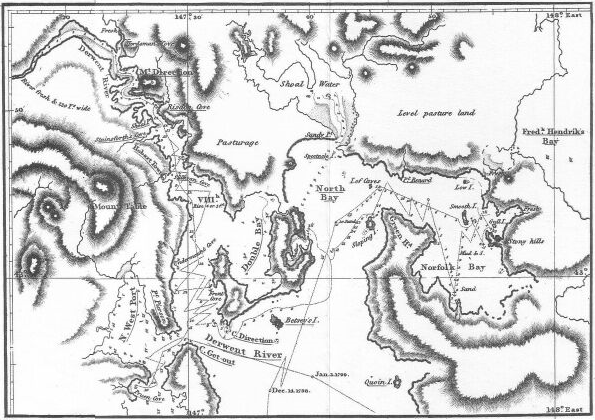
Matthew Flinders' 1798 map of Norfolk Bay shows his passage around Smooth Island.

Prior to European settlement, the Forestier Peninsula to the east of Smooth Island is believed to have been occupied by the Pydairrerme band of the Oyster Bay (Paredarerme) tribe of Aboriginal Tasmanians. They spoke the Paredarerme language. There is no recorded evidence of any remaining Paredarerme people in the region after the 1830s.

=== European settlement ===
In 1793 Jean-Baptiste Philibert Willaumez (of the Antoine Bruni d'Entrecasteaux expedition) was the first European to discover Smooth Island. The island is found on d'Entrecasteaux's maps, though it is unnamed.

On 15 December 1798 Matthew Flinders was the first Briton to set foot on Smooth Island. He stopped to take bearings and spent two nights on the island. He described his impression of the island:

[They] moved on to another island which, from a distance, appeared unusually attractive. At close quarters, the island seemed every bit as beautiful as it did from afar. Its surface was smooth and the texture of its soil contained a richness which is rarely found in uncultivated land. It was estimated that there must have been at least one hundred acres of good, yielding agricultural ground. But the unhappy and unforseen part of this seemingly natural course taken by the sloop was the denial of the sighting by the ship's personnel of an isthmus which would have been of great importance to them.
But "Smooth Island", as they so aptly named it, was indeed delectable and aforded them two delightful days in exploring its scenery and absorbing its charm and beauty. They observed that the Aborigines paid this scenic spot many visits because of its garden-like qualities as compared with the stony-like terrain of the mainland which, although well-wooded and contained many kangaroos, seemed harsh and uninviting in comparison to their "Garden Island", a title it eventually acquired.

Flinders charted the island and his passage through the region on the map Chart of Terra Australis – By M Flinders – 1798–1799 – South Coast, Sheet VI. He described his initial impression of sailing eastwards from Doughboy Island in Frederick Henry Bay towards Norfolk Bay:

The country on the eastern side of the bay, is stony; and, wherever we landed, is wretchedly barren. The islands have a better appearance. Smooth Island, contains about one hundred acres of ground, that might answer for a garden: its soil is shallow and sandy.

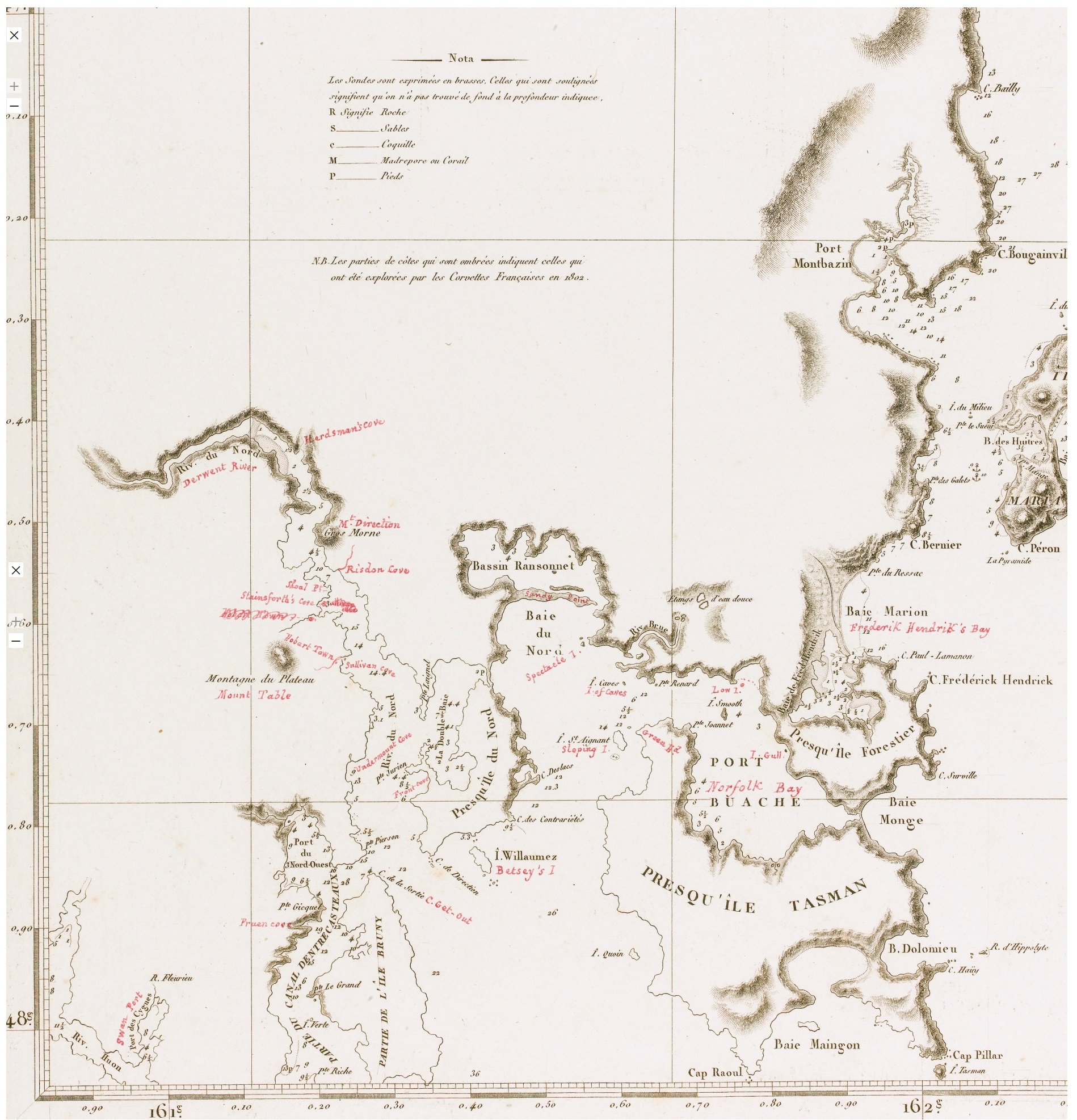
1812: Freycinet, Louis-Claude de Saulces from Voyage de Découvertes aux Terres Australes (English: Discovery Trip to the Southern Lands), navigation and geography atlas. Paris: Dépôt général des cartes et plans de la marine.

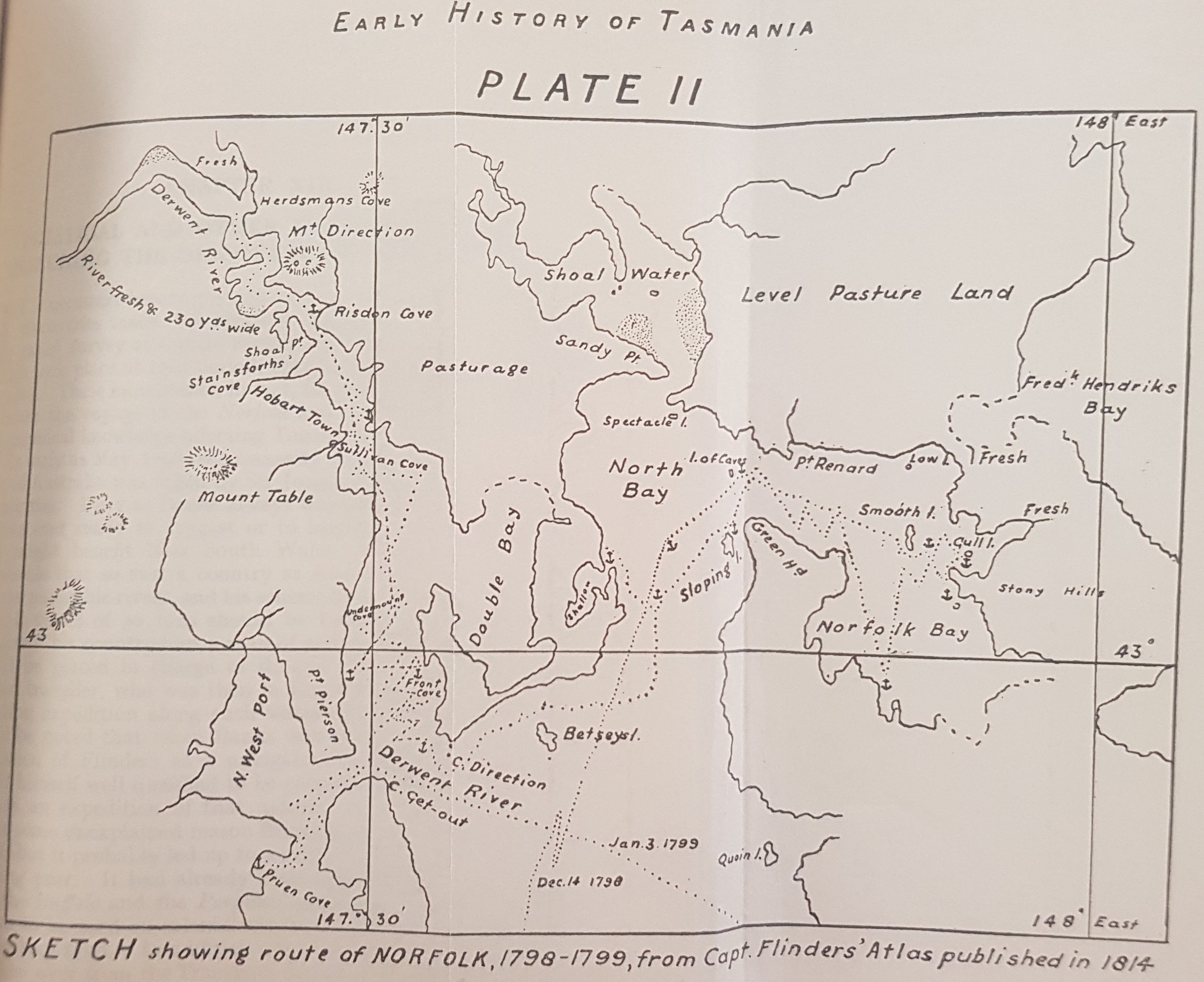
A sketch of Capt. Flinder's voyage through Norfolk Bay, Tasmania in 1814

He appeared surprised by the nautical ability of the Aboriginal Tasmanians:

The natives of Frederick Henry Bay, have some mode of conveyance by water; for they had visited Betsey's Island, the Isle of Caves, Smooth Island, and Gull Island; and, perhaps, the others. It has been a received opinion, that the inhabitants of this part of Van Diemen's Land have no canoes; and, had our observations been confined to the Derwent River, we should have joined in that opinion.

In A Voyage to Terra Australis he wrote, "Smooth Island [...] is three-quarters of a mile long, and covered with grass and a few small trees. It has been visited by the natives, as had the Isle of Caves; but from the eggs of gulls found upon both, I judge they do not go often." In the same text he also said, "Of the four islands in the bay, Smooth and Gull islands were found superior in fertility to the mainland: the first contains about 40 acres [16 ha] of tolerable pasturage".

In Matthew Flinders narrative of a voyage in the sloop Norfolk, 7 October 1798 – 12 January 1799 he wrote, "In the afternoon we weighed and steered for a smooth beautiful looking island up the opening which bore from E.5°.30' to 10°.40' south from the Isle of Caves; and measured another base in the same manner as before; their distance asunder is five miles and three-quarters. On landing upon this smooth island in the evening we did not find the goodness of the soil equal to its appearance: it would however make a fine large Garden, there being more than a hundred acres of culturable ground upon it. December. 16. Sunday. In the morning I again landed to take bearings from another part of the island; after which, we weighed and ran to the south side of a point which lays one mile and a half to the S.Eward; the wind fresh from the Northward. From a hill, that stands a little within this point, I had a good view of the form of the bay in its neighbourhood. Monday. 17th. In the evening we ran round to the north side of the point, there being every appearance of a southerly Gale coming on; but it continued moderate, and in the morning we landed upon the Islet called Gull Island in the chart."

=== 1800s ===
==== Role in the Risdon Cove convict settlement ====
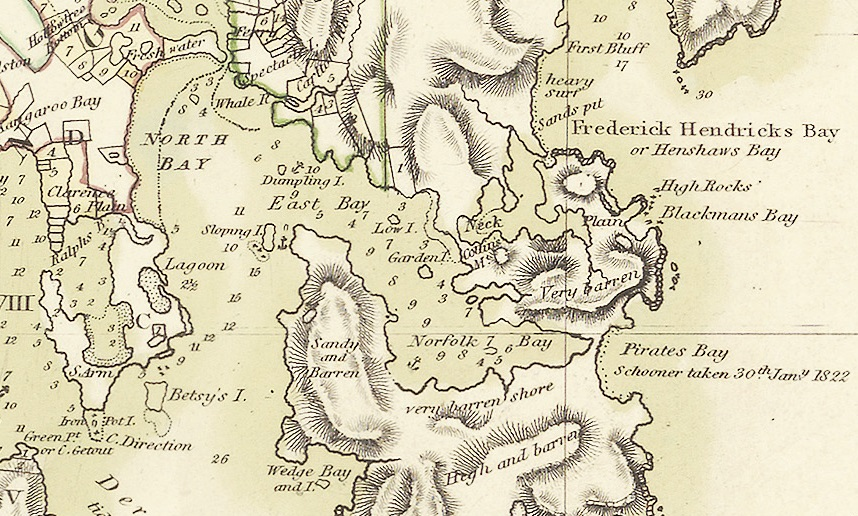
1824: Thomas Scott's map of Norfolk Bay. Smooth Island is labelled 'Garden Island'

In summary:

- 22 April 1804: an attempted mutiny occurred at Risdon Cove convict settlement
- 28 April: Bowen (the Commandant of Risdon settlement) personally took eight Irish prisoners to Smooth island using his own boat.
  - Bowen then subsequently explored the Huon River for several days, on a recreational basis.
- 3 May: (in Bowen's absence): Risdon was attacked by aborigines.
- 6 May: The King instructed Collins to take command of Risdon settlement
- 8 May: Collins gave Bowen orders to remove the convicts from Smooth Island.
- 9 August: The Risdon settlement was relocated to Sullivans Cove, whilst Bowen and the majority of the convicts were transferred back to Sydney.

From "Early History of Tasmania", Volume 2, by Ronald Worthy Giblin:

On April the 22nd a small mutiny occurred over the old question of mounting guard, and he also learned that there was a plot amongst the prisoners to take possession of the Risdon settlement, a movement which they hoped would be joined by others from Sullivan Cove. Strong measures were taken to deal with this menace; the mutinous soldiers were sent by Collins to Sydney in the cutter Integrity, which had succeeded in getting to Sullivan Cove from Kent's Bay, and on the 28th April Bowen went off in his boat to Norfolk Bay, taking eight of the 'daring flagitious and desperate characters,' as Collins described them, 'all Irish,' as Knopwood wrote in his journal, to place them on Smooth Island (Plate II, Vol. I). We must note the process which thus reached this climax. England shoots a lot of its refuse across the seas to 'Botany Bay.' Super-saturation having taken place there, and an equal desire having arisen to get rid of some of the worst of the rubbish, it was sent across the water to Risdon. As there are no means at Risdon of dealing with desperate characters, the picked element, that is, the worst, are put upon an island with a month's provisions. Increase the output from England and some substitute will have to be found for that island, because you cannot go on marooning desperadoes in bulk if you have no walls or stockades to contain them. And the 'refuse' was as diverse in character as were the social classes in England.(page 16)

When Bowen had deposited his firebrands on Smooth Island, he made an excursion, presumably for pleasure, to the Huon River. His absence from his post was unfortunate, because on the 3rd May an event took place at Risdon, a collision between the Europeans there and a large body of natives, which might possibly have been handled differently and better had the Commandant been present. This was the first important clash of a long series between British and blacks on the island."(page 17)

On 6 May 1804 the King requested Collins take over command of the Risdon settlement from Bowen. Upon taking over, Collins decided to relocate the Risdon settlement to Sullivan Cove, leaving Bowen in charge of Risdon until the move had completed. On 8 May Collins issued the following instructions to Bowen:

(..) the eight men placed by Bowen on Smooth Island were brought back and kept at work under strict supervision, and full preparations were made for the despatch to Sydney of all those people whom the Lieutenant-Governor had no wish to retain. In the end nine prisoners only, chiefly mechanics, were considered worth keeping at the Derwent. (..) The Ocean sailed for Sydney on the 9th August, taking Commandant John Bowen, (..) and the main gang of convicts. (..) The departure of the ship marked the end of Risdon Cove as a settlement, and the condition of the site was changed to one better befitting it, the peaceful solitude of farm land.(page 21)

Collins reported to the Secretary of State, Lord Hobart, in July 1804, that he had retained only nine of the Risdon Cove prisoners, "Eight of whom had been banished...to an Island in Storm Bay, upon suspicion of harbouring some Mutinous design". Being mostly of the "class of United Irishmen" he sent them to Port Jackson "not choosing to introduce any such description of People among those I brought with me, until my Military Force shall be better calculated from its Strength to Watch over them"

In 1824 Thomas Scott conducted a survey of Tasmania, producing a detailed map of Tasmania (including the Norfolk Bay region).

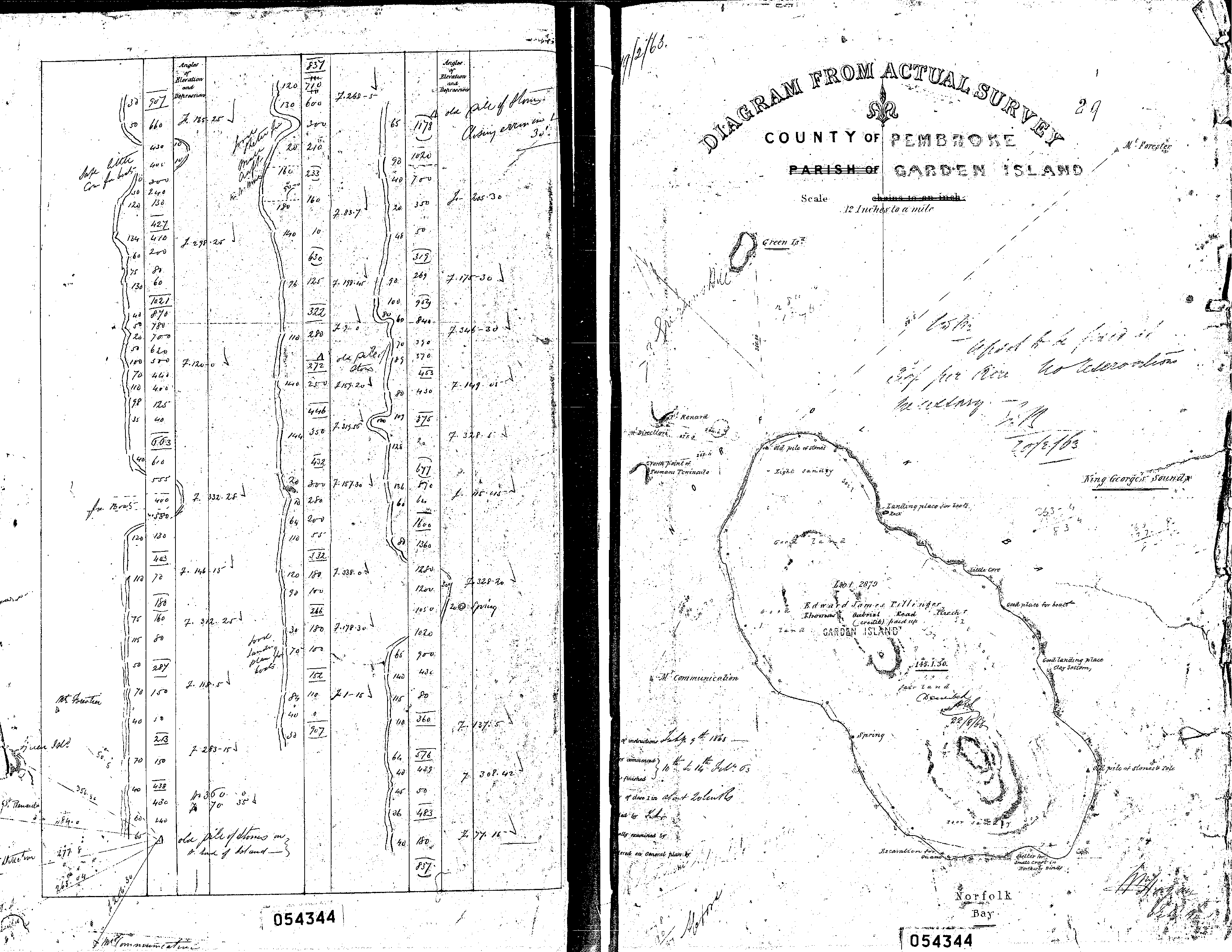
1863: Official surveyance report of Smooth Island

On 15 February 1836 Smooth Island was defined as lying within the county of Pembroke.

On 10 February 1837 Captain Charles O'Hara Booth (commandant of Port Arthur penal settlement) woke on Slopin Main and travelled to Smooth Island (called Garden Island) to spend the day hunting with his associate, Ramsay.

Rose betimes – dilly dally'd until 8 A.M. crossed to Garden Island took Guns & Dogs – Ramsay & self bagged 15 Couple & a half – Shot between us six couple – Self killed 5 out of 7 Shots – got into Settlement pretty tired by 8 1/2 P.M. Snoozed like tops – black as tinkers.

On 17 September 1839, Smooth Island was offered for sale as part of the 'Estate of Fulham'.

THE ESTATE OF FULHAM. COMPRISING about 3000 Acres, situate at East Bay Neck, bounded by the Bay, Crown Land, and Messrs. Crocker and Steele. As an Agricultural Farm, this Estate possesses advantages rarely to be met with; 250 acres of rich wheat land is already in the highest state of cultivation, enclosed and subdivided with substantial fencing. The Homestead is most substantial and complete, with good garden and excellent water. The Residence (newly erected) comprises 15 apartments, suitable for a family of the first respectability. The produce can be shipped from the barn door. The title is unexceptionable; Garden Island is included in the Grant. For further particulars, apply to T. Y. LOWES. N.B. – A liberal credit will be given, at 8 per cent, interest, and any quantity of stock may be taken at a valuation by the purchaser.

Captain Charles O'Hara Booth liked the idea of owning an island; in 1839 he applied to the Land and Survey Department to buy Smooth Island but was informed that, although a lease could be arranged, ownership of all islands was reserved for the government.

A publication from 2011 indicates Smooth Island may have been used to grow vegetables for the Port Arthur penal settlement, which was in operation from 1833 to 1853. However this claim cannot yet be verified.

On 19 February 1863, Thomas Reid commissioned the surveyor general, James Erskine Calder, to assess the island. In his survey, Calder determined the island was 146 acres (59 ha), lightly timbered, with about 40 acres (16 ha) suitable for agriculture with little or no clearing. He believed that the remaining portion of the land could be cleared or burned-off for pasture. He rated the island's water to be of good quality but unproven for the demands of cattle. The eastern shore of the island was found to have the best landings, and had been improved in four places, Calder believed, for whaling operations carried out on Norfolk Bay. There had been some mineral exploration for blue granite and iron, though no beds were found. Calder evaluated the island as "well worth £2 per acre".

On 14 April 1863 Smooth Island, which was classed as agricultural Crown land at the time, was designated for sale at public auction on 23 April the following year, in accordance with the Waste lands Act. Several key clauses of the act were described. It was initially listed for a minimum sale price of £227. Thomas Gabriel Reid commissioned a detailed survey of the island which took place between 10 and 14 July 1863 (see survey report inset). It appears Thomas Gabriel Reid purchased the island on 21 April 1864 for only £155. A "Thomas G. Read" was recorded as living in the nearby town of Sorell in 1866. On 31 October 1894, Thomas Gabriel Read died at New Norfolk at 70 years of age. He was the second son of Captain G. F. Read. Thomas Gabriel Read was a notable gold-miner. A detailed biography of Thomas Gabriel Read is available.

On 8 November 1869, Lieutenant Colonel Mundy said, "the pretty wooded Garden Island [was] lying in the jaws of [Norfolk Bay]", suggesting that clearfelling had not yet occurred on the island.

On 4 April 1870, a sailor traveling past Smooth Island wrote in a local newspaper,

Garden Island is the peaceful abode of two or three families, and its cultivated appearance renders its name quite apropos. Water is plentiful, but in dry seasons brackish, and the place is well adapted for the rearing of stock, a matter not lost sight of.

On 14 March 1878, a newspaper article reported "[In] Norfolk Bay, about two miles from East Bay Neck, lies Garden Island, which is under cultivation, and yields excellent crops".

On 26 July 1878, Smooth Island was sold at auction for £400. Prior to its sale, real estate agents had advertised it as:

[...] containing 145 acres [59 ha] of the most superior land, nearly all of which has been cultivated, and is now most luxuriantly grassed, and well watered in the driest season. [...] For richness of soil and the production of heavy root and grain crops, this property has no equal in Tasmania.

On 5 August 1878, Garden Island's new owner, James Quested, published a notice in newspapers warning that he would prosecute any fishermen, craftsman or others trespassing upon the island.

On 15 November 1883, Captain Haughton Forrest liquidated James Quested's assets at Sorell police station.

IN THE SUPREME COURT OF TASMANIA. SMALL DEBTS ACT JURISDICTION. DALY V. QUESTED. WRIT of Fi. Fa., dated 21st day of August, 1880, received 23rd day of August, 1880; levy made on 2nd day of September, 1880, on all defendant's right, title, and interest on and to 145 acres of land (more or less), and the appurtenances thereon, situate at Garden Island, in the County of Pembroke, in the Colony of Tasmania, which will be sold by me by public auction, at the Police Office, Sorell, at noon, on MONDAY, the 15th day of November, 1880, unless the execution be previously satisfied. Dated the 25th day of October, 1880. H. FORREST, Bailiff of the Court of General Sessions, Sorell.

On 2 June 1883, the island was again advertised for private sale.

FOR PRIVATE SALE, GARDEN ISLAND, in Norfolk Bay, occupied by Mr. Quested. It contains 145 acres of superior land, well sub-divided, a considerable portion under cultivation; with homestead. The Pinafore passes three times a week. ROBERTS & Co, Murray-street

On 14 June 1884, a local newspaper reported, "Garden Island, of about 100 acres, situated about a mile off the northern limit of King George Sound", Forestier's Peninsula, is occupied, and appears to have good soil by the newly-turned sod of the paddocks, and has upon it the buildings and paraphernalia of the average farm." On 19 November 1889, an advertisement in a local newspaper offered "100 prime fat wethers from Garden Island". From 3 December 1893 until December 1894, the island was advertised for private sale:

On 14 July 1894, Captain Jones and his crew of whale hunters (on the whaling barque Taranna) "shifted their quarters from Slopen Island Sloping Island to Garden Island, as it [was] believed that 3 whales had been sighted in the vicinity of the Sounds". The expedition was unsuccessful and returned to Hobart on 16 July 1894.

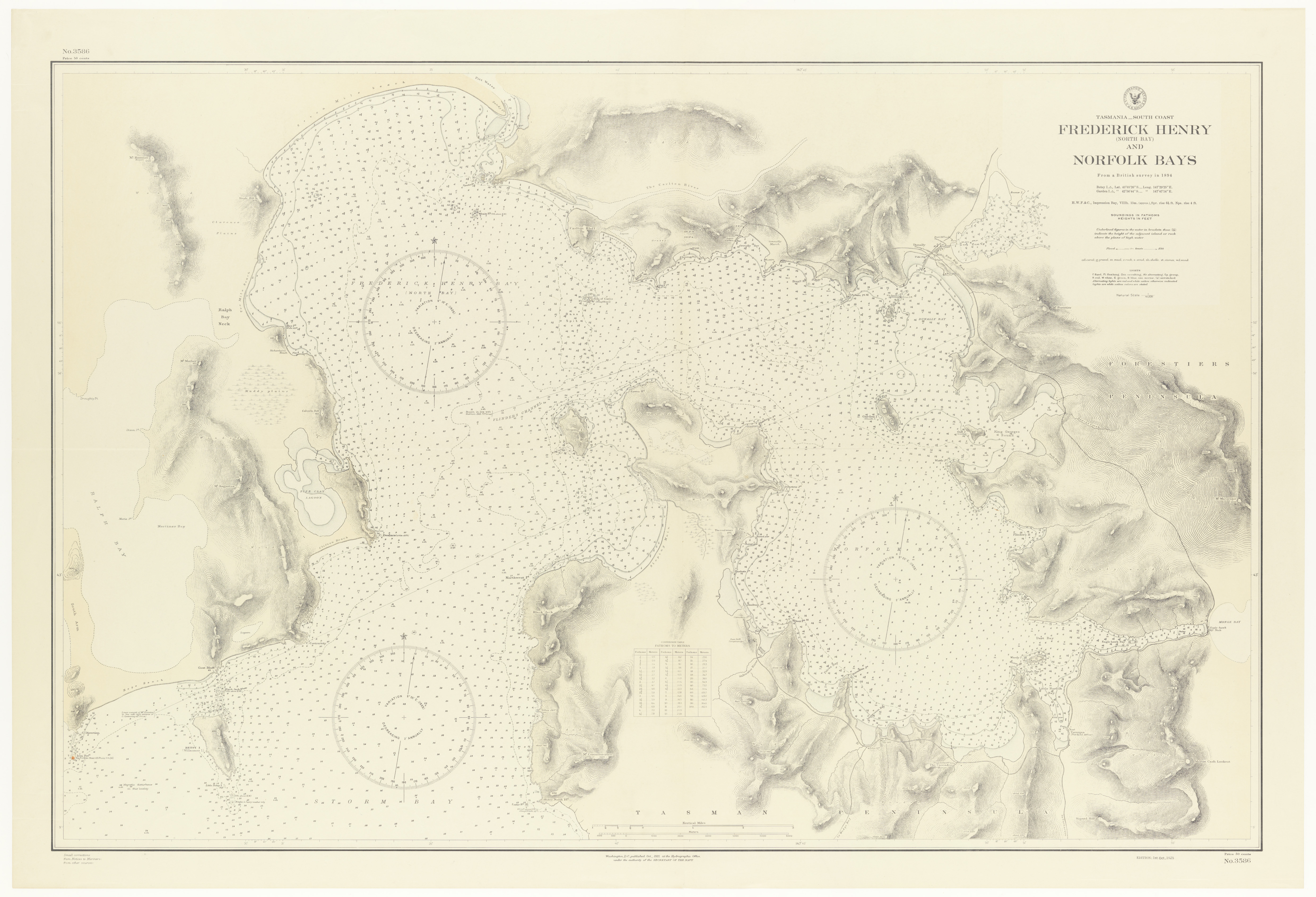
1894: British survey map of Norfolk Bay showing Smooth Island

On 8 December 1894, the island was advertised for sale. The description suggests that fresh water was available on the island, corresponding with the "Spring" found the survey map of 1863.

In January 1895, a real estate agent was used. It appears that all trees had been cleared from the island by this stage. The island was advertised as, "146 Acres Grass Land, suitable for cultivation. Easy Terms. R. DARLING, Agent, 54, Murray-street.". advertised the sale of Garden Island livestock in September 1895.

The British conducted a survey of Norfolk Bay and Frederick Henry Bay (a.k.a. North Bay) in 1894, producing the map seen to the right. It was published on 1 October 1925

=== 1900s ===
On 4 January 1900 a reader of the Mercury demanded a lighthouse be placed on Garden Island. Smooth Island was owned by Samuel Nicholas Wellard in the early 1900s. He was a well-known sheep breeder who lived in Forcett, Tasmania. He died in August 1934.

On 16 November 1903, the Commissioner of Police (Mr G. Richardson) received a telegram, intimating that the fishing boat Stella had been lost off Smooth Island. A man named Netherton, and another, were drowned. No particulars were available. However, this was subsequently found to be a false report and both men and their boat were found safe.

On 7 August 1905, a report describes docking at Smooth Island during one of the first passages through the Denison Canal:

Storm Bay and Norfolk Bay were successively passed, and then we came in sight of Garden Island, opposite Dunalley, which thoroughly deserves its name, and the long jetty, doomed to disappear, where hitherto passengers have been discharged. Here we took on board an old fisherman, who has been 30 years in these parts, and knows the depth of every inch of the way.

On 21 August 1914, Chris Wellard, a nephew of Smooth Island's owner, died mysteriously after sailing away from the island. The Mercury reported on 25 August that Chris Wellard, a resident of Forester's Peninsula, had conveyed sheep from Smooth Island to the S.S. Breone then cast off with the intention of returning to the mainland. Three days later his boat was found several miles away, floating upside-down, with one of the three dogs he'd had with him sitting on the keel. On 2 September the Mercury reported that after transporting sheep to the Breone, Wellard returned to the island and loaded his dinghy with some 300 kg of fish manure, a lamb and three dogs. The Breone offered to tow Wellard to the mouth of King George's Sound on the west side of Forestrier's Peninsula, which was near Wellard's home. However, once underway, the dinghy began taking water over its bow and was cast off. Wellard at once turned back toward the island's jetty, which was only 200 yards away, while the Breone lost sight of him around a point. On 4 September, S. N. Wellard wrote that the fish manure, which had unusually been loaded in the bow of the boat, would have become much heavier as it absorbed water. He suggested that his nephew had tried to lighten the dinghy and caused it to imbalance, the front going down before it rolled.

In August 1917, 92 head of cattle, "fattened on Garden Island, down Port Arthur way" were exported to Victoria. Several livestock-clearing sales occurred throughout 1919. These references suggest the clearing sale was due to the recent sale of the island. The family which owned the island (immediately prior to the current owners) acquired it in 1927.

In 1920, a marine guide provided the following description of Garden Island:

Garden Island, about 1 1/2 miles southward of Low Island, is nearly 3/4 mile long north-northwest and south-southeast and 1/4 mile wide. It is 140 feet high and clear of trees except a clump on the south end, it contains a few acras of very good pasture land; near the north point are some farm buildings. On the east side of Garden Island and northward of it to Dunally Bay, the water is shallow; but good ancorage in from 4 to 5 fathoms may be had in northwest wings under the southeast corner of the island.

In 1936 the Tasmanian Game Protection and Acclimatisation Society, assisted by the Animals and Birds Protection Board, imported 110 European grey partridges to Tasmania from England, at a cost of £150. These were liberated with Tasmania at Smooth Island, Marrawah, Whiteford and Colebrook. By 1950 these birds had disappeared. The European grey partridge is not established anywhere in Australia, at present.

Newspaper articles from the 1940s suggest that the Bellerive Yacht Club held an annual boat race around Smooth Island.

On 9 April 1946, Barclay Gray posted the following notice in a local newspaper:

No hunting or shooting allowed on Fulham, Garden or Low Island. Trespassers prosecuted. S B. Gray, Dunalley.

Prior to change of ownership, Smooth Island was primarily used as pasturage for livestock. It is reported that on some occasions up to 600 sheep would graze on the island simultaneously.

==== Marine survey ====
Between February 1995 and December 1996, a beam trawl was placed within the Zostera tasmanica site on the Smooth Island's east coast.

Beam trawl results at Smooth Island
Species	Count	% of catch
Little Rock Whiting (Neoodax balteatus)	1262	49.86
Bridled Leatherjacket (Acanthaluteres spilomelanurus)	966	38.17
Spotted Pipefish (Stigmatopora argus)	90	3.56
Soldierfish (Gymnapistes marmoratus)	56	2.21
Crested Weedfish (Cristiceps australis)	45	1.78
Southern Cardinal Fish (Vincentia conspersa)	21	0.83
Port Phillip Pipefish (Vanacampus phillipi)	15	0.59
Sand Flathead (Platycephalus bassensis)	14	0.55
Girdled Goby (Nesogobius sp.1)	12	0.47
Orange-Spotted Goby (Nesogobius hinisbyi)	7	0.28
Red Cod (Pseudophycis bachus)	6	0.24
Toothbrush Leatherjacket (Acanthaluteres vittiger)	6	0.24
Red Rock Cod (Helicolenus barathri)	5	0.20
Half-Banded Pipefish (Mitotichthys semistriatus)	4	0.16
Adelaide Weedfish (Heteroclinus adelaidae)	4	0.16
Common Weedfish (Heteroclinus perspicillatus)	4	0.16
Six-Spined Leatherjacket (Meuschenia freycineti)	4	0.16
Castelnau's Goby (Nesogobius pulchellus)	2	0.08
Greenback Flounder (Rhombosolea tapirina)	2	0.08
Pot Bellied Seahorse (Hippocampus abdominalis)	1	0.04
Spotted Flounder (Ammotretis rostratus)	1	0.04
Richardson's Hardyhead (Atherinason hepsetoides)	1	0.04
Long Snouted Flounder (Ammotretis rostratus)	1	0.04
Brownstriped Leatherjacket (Meuschenia australis):	1	0.04
Pigmy Leatherjacket (Brachaluteres jacksonianus)	1	0.04
Total	2531	100

=== 2000s ===
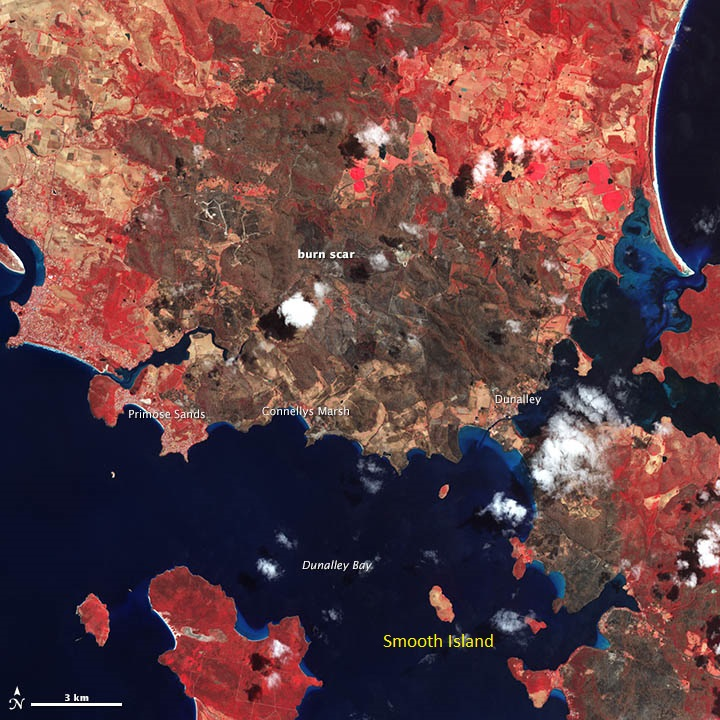
2013: False colour fire map of Norfolk Bay (black regions were burned, red regions were unaffected). Smooth Island is highlighted.

Between 2003 and 2007 Smooth Island was subleased to a local oyster farmer to transport oyster stock to and from a processing facility in Boomer Bay.

During 2004, Smooth Island was advertised for sale, with the following description:

This beautiful unhabitated island is located in Norfolk Bay in the Tasman Municipality of Southern Tasmania. Norfolk Bay is a picturesque waterway with superb sailing and cruising grounds, sandy beaches, excellent fishing, a wide variety of birdlife. It enjoys pure air and the natural beauty of the rural surroundings of the Tasman Peninsula. Smooth Island can be accessed by boat from any point, and the township of Dunalley is close by. Tasmania's capital city of Hobart and the International airport is within easy commuting distance. The Island has an area of 58 Ha or 145 acres or thereabouts, gently undulating with some trees and pasture for winter grazing. It only takes a couple of minutes by boat to arrive at the island and on the lee side there is an old stone and timber jetty that is in need of repair, but the concrete piers and the stone section are very solid. Once ashore you feel a real sense of freedom as the only noise comes from the prolific bird life. There is a shearwater rookery (mutton birds) and quail by the hundreds and as you wander through the low grass suddenly the quail will take to the air or you will hear the sounds of some of the local native hens. This island has been with the one family since 1927 and is truly a remarkable bird life sanctuary. In times past the owners have had up to 600 sheep on the island during winter, but this was ceased several years ago. There are no snakes, rabbits or native animals on the island with the exception of a few blue tongue lizards and of course the birds. There are several stands of trees on various parts of the island and a beautiful old pine tree down near the jetty. There is a chimney on the lee side of the island which is the remains of a homestead long since burnt down. There is also a tower with a beacon to guide boats. This facility is maintained by Marine and Safety Tasmania. The waters surrounding the island are crystal clear and unpolluted. The potential for a tourism development (subject to Council approval) on this green field location is fantastic as it would give privacy, seclusion and relaxation away from the hustle and bustle of normal life, but the most attractive aspect of the whole island is the stunning views across the bay from all points of the island to the largely undeveloped vista. Appointment to inspect this property would need to be arranged with the agent at least 3 days prior.

On 24 January 2006, The Mercury (Hobart) reported:

HOPES are fading for finding a missing fisherman alive after a boating mishap in Norfolk Bay near Dunalley.

Police conducted extensive sea and land searches yesterday with a team of divers searching the bottom of the bay near Fulham Island.

Two men aged in their 40s fell into the water on Saturday night when their 13-foot aluminium dinghy capsized.

One of the men, from Hobart, swam to Fulham Island, where he was rescued by a passing boat on Sunday morning. The other man, from Murdunna, is still missing, feared drowned.

Both men were not wearing life jackets.

Acting Inspector Brian Edmonds said the rescued man was in good health but traumatised by the experience.

On 25 January 2006, Daily Telegraph (Sydney) reported:

HOPES were fading yesterday of finding a missing fisherman alive after a boating accident in southern Tasmania.

Police divers resumed a scaled-down search yesterday morning around Fulham and Smooth Islands, near where the man's dinghy capsized in strong winds on Saturday.

His fishing companion managed to stay with the upturned boat and swim to Fulham Island where he was rescued on Sunday morning.

The missing Tasman Peninsula resident, in his 40s, has not been seen since the accident.

As time passes, the chances of finding him alive are reduced, a police spokeswoman said.

Four police boats and SES volunteers on Monday made a grid search of land and sea around Frederick Henry Bay.

The island was reportedly priced at A$1,650,000 in 2010.

Satellite imagery indicates that the 2013 Tasmanian bushfires did not burn Smooth Island.

During 2013, Smooth Island was advertised for sale, with the following description:

Easily accessible from Hobart by sea-faring boat or trailered craft, a place where privacy is total, a beautiful environment second to none and less than one hour from Hobart. Smooth Island is located in Norfolk Bay surrounded by the historic landscapes of Forestier and Tasman peninsulas. The island is just a short boat ride from launching ramps, with ramps as close as Murdunna and Dunalley. On its eastern side there is a jetty located in an anchorage that is nicely sheltered from north-westerly through to south-westerly winds. A deeper water anchorage on the western shoreline provides good shelter from winds with an easterly component. The island has been farmed for many years and currently provides winter grazing for up to 600 hoggets [young sheep]. In addition to the pasture there are some forest trees, mainly Eucalyptus globulus and Allocasuarina stricta. There are also some old established Macrocarpas at the site where a cottage once stood. The vegetation concentrated around the shoreline contributes to a very pleasant and inviting coastal margin along which shelter can be found in almost any weather. The island is home to a number of seabirds. At the southern and south-western end there is a substantial mutton bird rookery. The magnetic sea eagles and wedge-tailed eagles are also frequent visitors to Smooth Island. Other birds common to the island include pacific gulls, kelp gulls, quail, a variety of terns, silver gulls, oyster catcher cormorants and gannets. The waters immediately surrounding the island provide good fishing, with flathead, trumpeter, perch, cod and Australian salmon being the principal species available. Dolphins are frequent visitors and whales have occasionally been sighted close to the island. Smooth Island would make for a wonderful hideaway lifestyle. At 58.86 ha there is sufficient land to run a substantial number of either sheep or cattle. At present it is being used primarily as winter grazing (April–Oct) for 600 hoggets. These are landed on the eastern shoreline where the jetty and stock races are located. For someone contemplating a pseudo self-sufficient lifestyle the island offers a unique opportunity. Or... on the other hand it would be an excellent location for that weekend shack with a difference. It represents a remote location but with the convenience of relatively easy access to the hotel at nearby Dunalley along with the local supermarkets, service station, hairdressers, golf course, P.O., bakery and dining options available in that village. Imagine owning your very own Island? This is a rare opportunity to make a dream your reality. surrounded by waterfront, rare opportunity to own your own private island. Only approximately 5 mins by boat to choice of public boat ramps

In November 2013, after just 19 days on the market, Smooth Island was sold for $875,000–900,000 to a couple from Victoria. They planned to revegetate the island, build a home, and retire there.

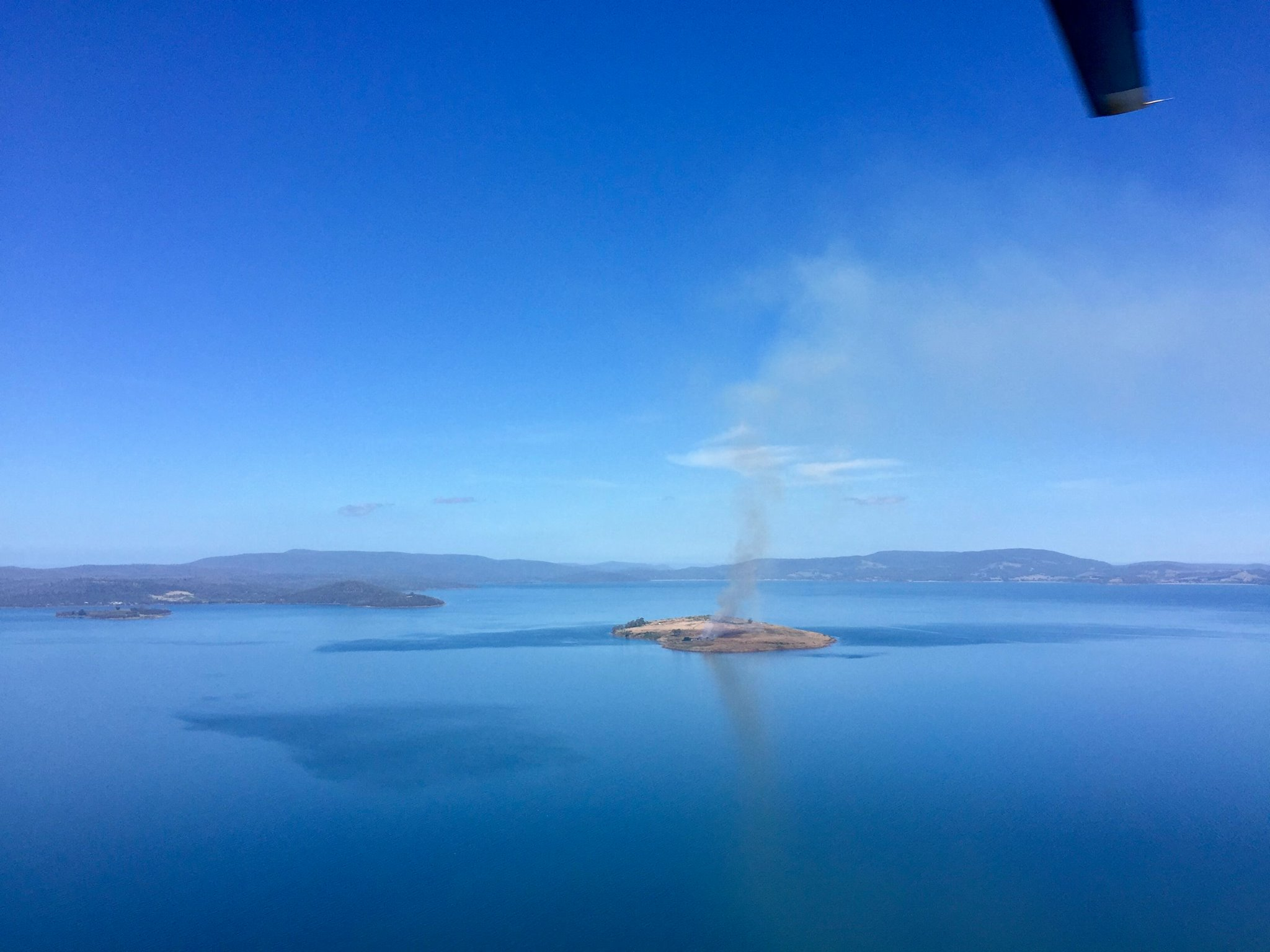
Structure fire on Smooth Island, 2018

On 16 January 2018, a structure on Smooth Island was damaged by fire.

On 9 April 2018, the Aircraft Noise Ombudsman published recommendations after investigating noise complaints from residents of Dunalley and Smooth Island following changes to flight paths into Hobart Airport

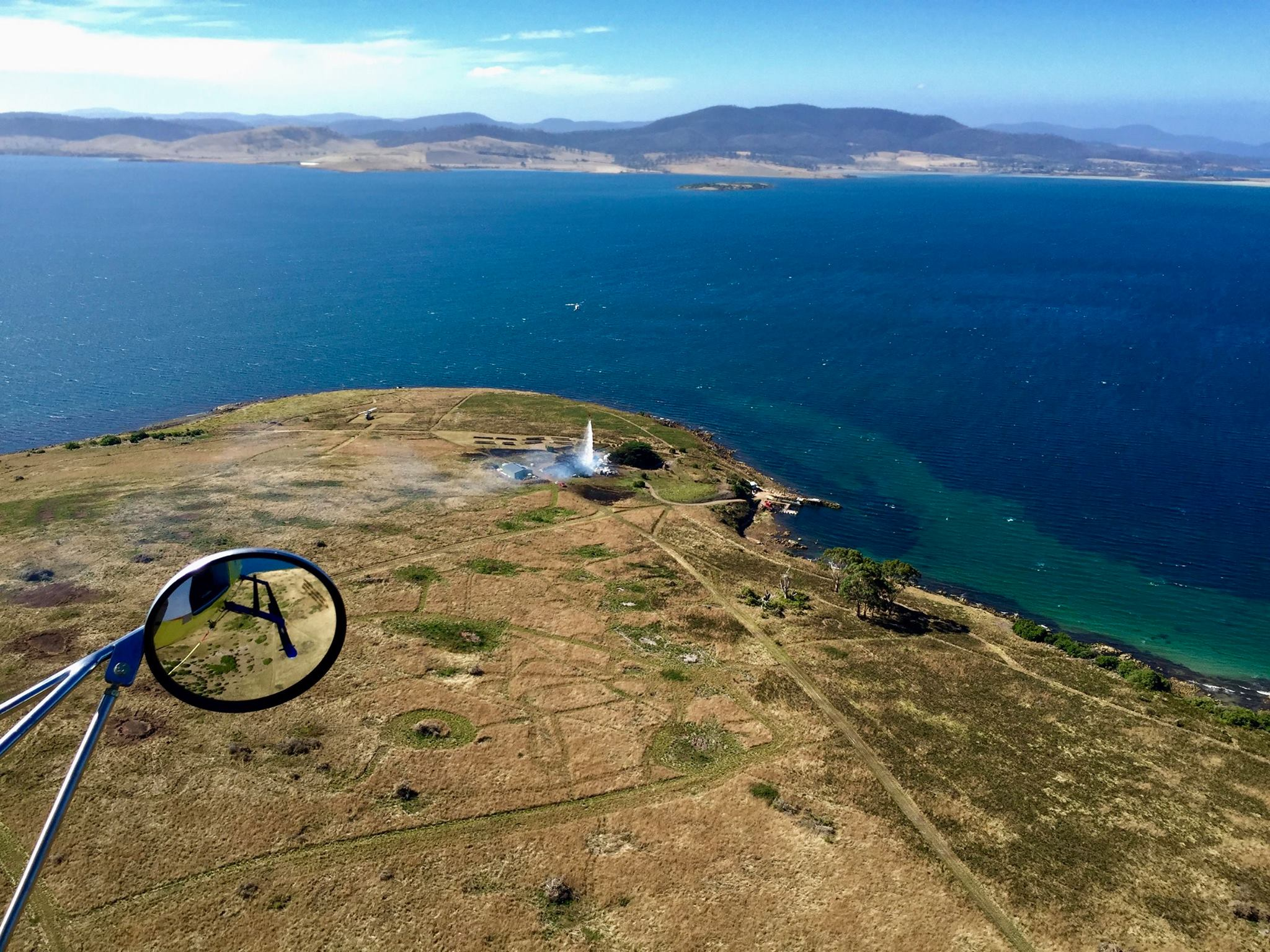
Water-bombing helicopters fighting Smooth Island fire

On 15 January 2019, dry lightning struck a large tree on the middle of the east coast of the island. This spread to adjacent trees and caused a 1-acre grass fire which was contained independently by the owners. On 16 January 2019, the local fire service attended and completed a 'blackout', to fully extinguish any residual smouldering embers.

== Owners ==
Previous owners and property transactions
Date purchased	Purchase price	Owner name	Notes and references
21 April 1864	£155	Thomas Gabriel Read	Biography
10 October 1866	£163 s11 d11	Edward James Pillinger	Info from Ancestry.com. Circumstances of death.
23 April 1878	£300	Henry Charles Vimpany	Title deed; Vimpany was a bootmaker.
19 August 1878	£400	James Quested	Title deed; further information. Information obtained from Ancestry.com.
(? 25 October to 15 November 1880, public auction, Sorell Police Station)		Captain Haughton Forrest	Policeman; he ordered James Quested to liquidate all of his possessions at public auction. (Captain Forrest himself became the winning bidder at this auction. No concerns about a potential conflict of interest appear to have been raised publicly.) Biography. His name was spelled "Houghton Forrest" in many newspaper records.
11 February 1881		George Herbert Bailey	Title deed. Bailey purchased the property from Houghton Forrest. Bailey sold all his possessions and left the colony on 17 March 1882.
16 January 1884		Captain Thomas de Hoghton	Title deed. Obituaries. Information obtained from Ancestry.com. Name has been spelled "de Hoghton", "de Houghton" and "de Haughton" Capt de Haughton had not lived on the island by 1891 (but intended to).
4 October 1897		Samuel Nicholas Wellard	Title deed. Information obtained from Ancestry.com
28 August 1915		Arthur Charles Vince	Title deed.
24 October 1919		Norfolk John Wise	Title deed.
20 October 1926		Henry George Gray	Title deed.
30 November 1931		Barclay Gray	Title deed.
4 December 1973		Fulham Pty Ltd	Title deed.
22 February 1995		A. B. Gray	
5 December 2013		Advanced Electro Dynamics Pty Ltd	Title deed.

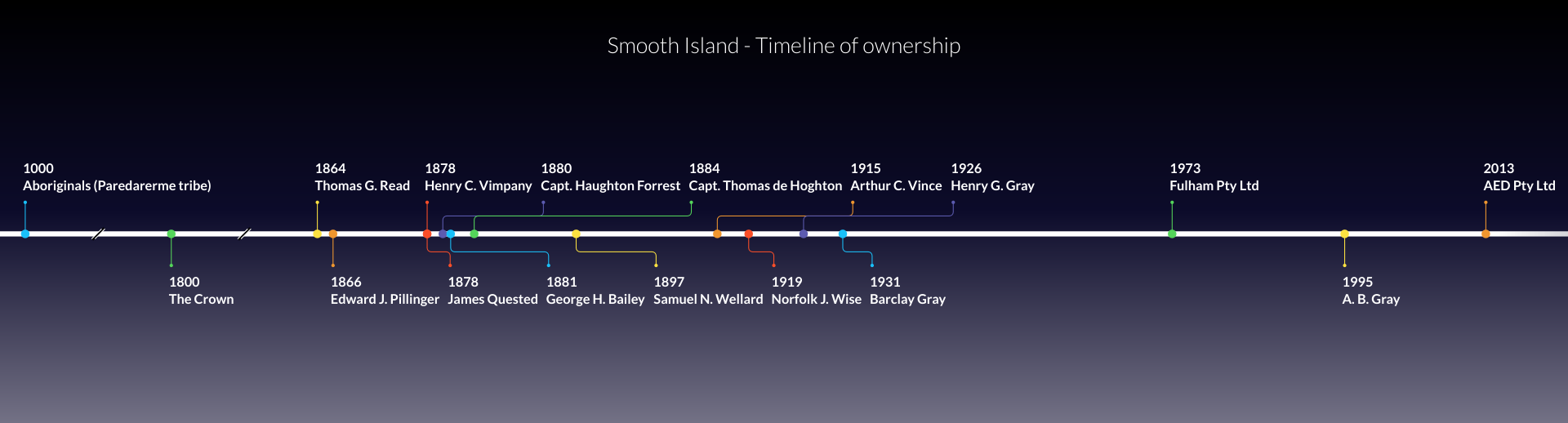
Smooth Island – timeline of ownership

=== Thomas Gabriel Read ===
Tasmanian gold prospector Thomas Gabriel Read started the Otago gold rush. He was born in Tasmania, the second son of Captain G. F. Read. Between 1861 and 1864 he was prospecting for gold in New Zealand. He received a reward of £1,000 and had returned to Tasmania in 1864, where he purchased Smooth Island. He purchased it from the government sale of crown land for £155, a significant discount from the £227 asking price advertised the week beforehand. Thomas Read was said to have taken up farming by 1865. He married Amelia Mitchell on 2 January 1869. He was admitted to a psychiatric hospital from 1887 until he died in 1894.

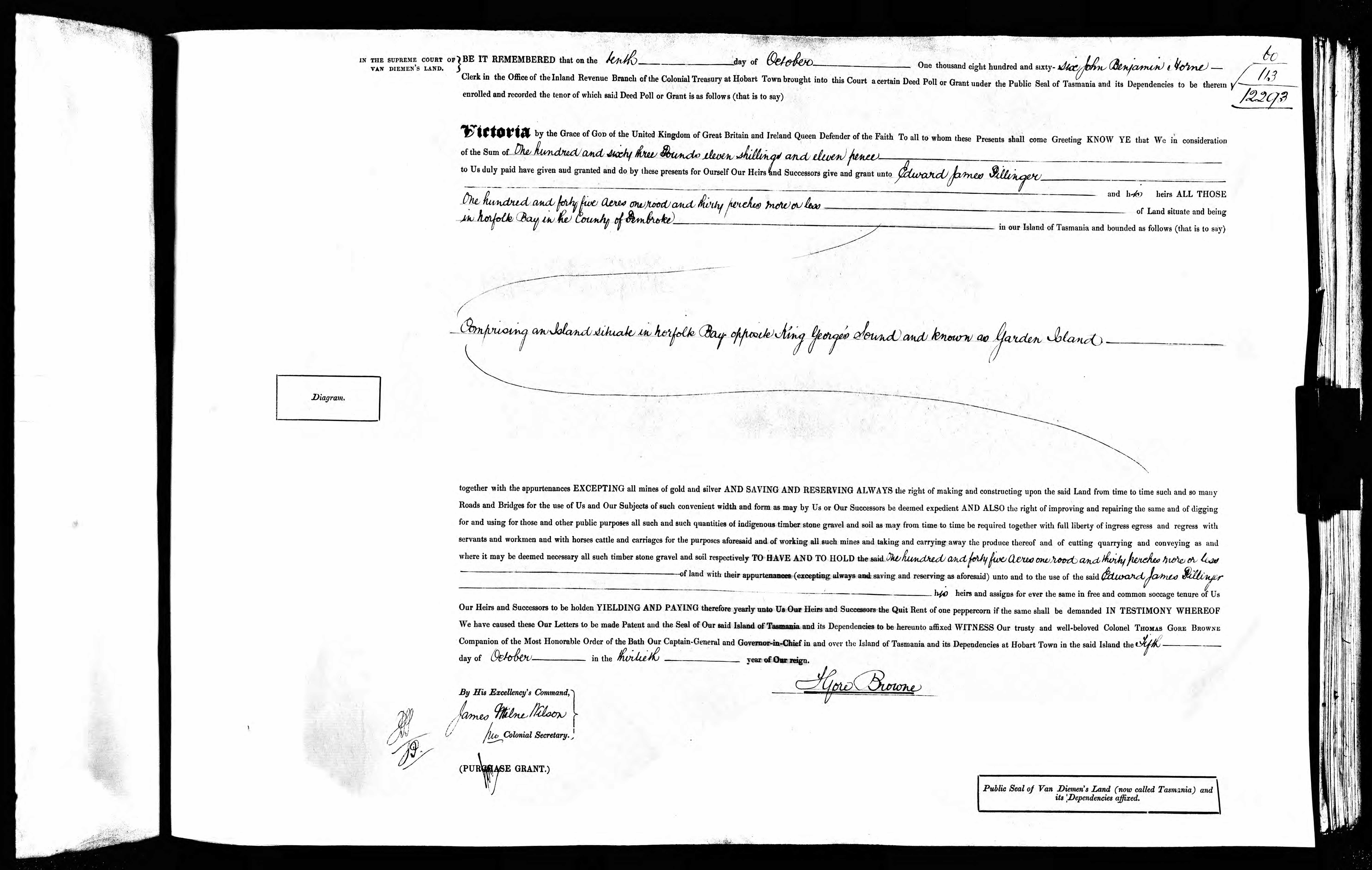
Edward James Pillinger's land grant for Smooth Island, 1866

Property title: Edward James Pillinger

=== Edward James Pillinger ===
Property title: Henry Charles Vimpany

Edward James Pillinger married on 5 September 1857 to Amelia Little, who was related to Mr E Vimpany. Pillinger claimed to live on the island 20 August 1867, and the Pillingers had a daughter, of unknown name, born 22 July 1874. Pillinger was engaged in a financial dispute with Read, the island's previous owner. Pillinger was found dead in Mr Neil Lewis's run in Milford, Cambridge on 8 June 1878, in an advanced state of decomposition. He was 50 years old. An inquest returned an open verdict, however given a partly empty bottle of strychnine was found near the corpse, poisoning was presumed to be the cause of death. Mr Pillinger's wife, Amelia, died on Smooth Island on 1 October 1876 after a 'short and painful' illness. Mr Pillinger probably sold the island between 1877 and 1878. Edward Pillinger was the brother-in-law of Mr Vimpany.

=== Henry Charles Vimpany ===
Vimpany died 22 December 1909.

=== James Head Quested ===
Property title: James Quested

James Head Quested was born in 1819 in Kent, England to Jane Seath (1791–1881, died in Hobart) and James Quested (1791–1877, died in Hobart). On 6 January 1827 his father was sentenced to life imprisonment for aiding and abetting smugglers; he was transported from London to Tasmania on the ship Governor Ready and received a conditional pardon on 9 March 1839.

James Head Quested became a master mariner and married Anne Mack (a.k.a. Ann Macnamara) on 17 October 1842 in Hobart. The couple lived on Smooth Island. In 1851 James Head Quested joined the Bendigo gold rush with John Rowlands (of Brushy Plains) and a man named 'Bannan' – the group was "fairly successful" there. Quested owned the ship Boomerang and traded between Tasmania, New Zealand and mainland Australia. He testified that a man boarded his ship in a drunk and quarrelsome manner. When the Boomerang was shipwrecked, Quested was accused of exaggerating the severity of the damage to obtain undue charity from the public.

Quested subsequently moved to Garden Island (he either rented it from Mr E Vimpany or purchased it himself) and started a butchering business. On 13 April 1871, James Quested's sheep dog died. He suspected it had been poisoned and offered a £10 reward for information leading to a conviction. Anne Mack was a drunk, had a very long, elaborate criminal record and was known to have a "very infirm temper". The Daly and Quested families had a long, bitter history of petty conflict which frequently aired in public, beginning at least during 1872. In 1872 Anne Mack reportedly had a public quarrel with John Daly, where she broke windows, used foul language and threw meat bones at him. On 15–16 May 1877, Mack was sentenced to 2 months of manual labor for maliciously wounding her daughter, Sarah Quested, with a knife.

On 28 May 1878, James Quested submitted a notice in a newspaper calling for all his financial accounts (debts and credits) to be settled, stating that his solicitor would seek to recover any debt not repaid by 10 June 1878. In spite of his financial difficulties, on 19 August 1878, Quested took the unusual decision to "purchase Smooth Island from Henry Vimpany for £400." Quested obtained at least four mortgages on the property and lost a court case (Adkins v. Quested, 1880) over unpaid wages. In late 1880, Quested was summoned to appear in court as part of these financial disputes. Quested was forced to sell the island via public auction on 15 November 1880 due to court order (Daly v. Quested, 1880). Police superintendent Houghton Forrest (Bailiff of the court of requests for the municipality of Sorell), who forced Quested to sell the island, purchased the island himself. (The title deed shows on 5 February 1881, Houghton Forrest transferred £70 to George Herbert Bailey, the island's future owner).

On 18 November 1880 Quested continued to occupy the house and 145 acres of land, paying £25 rent annually to E Vimpany. In 1881 he was arrested for disobeying a court summons and found liable for underpaying the wages of an employee. Quested continued to occupy the homestead on Smooth Island while it was owned by George Herbert Bailey (who held the deed from 11 February 1881 to 16 January 1884), and reportedly still lived on the island until at least 6 June 1883. There is no known record suggesting Quested occupied the island during any of Capt Thomas de Houghton's period of ownership (16 Jan 1884 to 4 October 1897). In 1886 Jamed Quested was charged with deserting his illegitimate child in Prahran, Victoria. Quested died 30 March 1892 (At Walker street, Redfern, Sydney). He was buried at Church of England section B No.47 at Cornelian Bay Cemetery, Hobart.

=== Captain Haughton Forrest ===
Capt Forrest seems to have lived in Sandy Bay and moved to the region in approximately 1876. Forrest was an artist but also Superintendent of Police. He was appointed Bailiff of Crown lands (also known as Bailiff of the Court of Requests) for the municipality of Sorell. He had to deal with a rebellion in Sorell, led by Mr Trooper Newitt, over a pay dispute. Forrest and Newitt went to court over the disputed cost of boat transport to Smooth Island (called Garden Island). The details of this dispute are as follows: In 1880, Newitt, a policeman of the Sorell municipality, had to go to Smooth Island to summon Quested and Townsend, another man living on the island, to court. Newitt had to pay a boatsman to transport him and attempted to reclaim this cost in court from Forrest, the police superintendent and his superior officer in Sorell. Between 25 October 1880 and 15 November 1880, Captain Forrest then proceeded to sell Quested's title, rights and interest in Smooth Island at a public auction at Sorell police station. The title deed shows, on 5 February 1881, Haughton Forrest transferred £70 to George Herbert Bailey, the island's future owner. It is likely that Captain Forrest acquired possession of the island for 3 to 4 months before it was then sold to Bailey.

Property title: George Herbert Bailey

=== George Herbert Bailey ===
The title deed shows that Bailey purchased the island from Forrest on 11 February 1881. Bailey sold his possessions on 17 March 1882, before leaving the colony.

Property title of Captain Thomas de Hoghton

=== Captain Thomas de Hoghton ===
Thomas de Hoghton was born on 24 October 1845. In 1861 de Hoghton was a cadet in the Royal Navy, and lived in Portsea, Hampshire in 1871. He married Julia Georgina Read on 29 March 1881 in Plenty, Tasmania. Capt de Hoghton owned the island between 16 January 1884 and 4 October 1897. In 1891 media reported that he lived in Cirencester, Gloucestershire, but on 5 December 1891, newspapers then reported that Capt de Hoghton intended to return to Tasmania and begin living on the island. Thomas had attempted to sell the island between 9 December 1893 and 12 January 1895. However, it may not have sold during this period. On 15 April 1911 he made comments in a newspaper relating to workers rights. He may have kept the island until just prior to his death, in line with a clearing sale in 1919. Further advertisements indicate another clearing sale occurred on 29 October 1919, after the island was reportedly sold. Thomas died 29 June 1920 at age 74 at his residence in Cleveland, Holebrook-place (Pontville). Julia died on 18 July 1928.

Property title: Samuel Nicholas Wellard

=== Samuel Nicholas Wellard ===
Samuel Wellard was born 27 October 1849 in Hobart to Thirza "Theresa" Champion (1812–1855) and Samuel Nicholas Wellard (1812–1859). He married Harriet Morey on 15 June 1871. He died 23 August 1934 in Bellerive, Tasmania. He publicly expressed opinions on the Ralph Bay Neck Canal. Charles, Samuel's nephew, accidentally died near Smooth Island. Samuel's brother, Walter Wellard, lived nearby in Murdunna from 1897 to 1937, until his death. Samual was said to have given up the lease of Smooth Island on 16 October 1901. Samuel's will was executed 6 June 1935 and all Samuel's property was assigned to Annie Wellard, the daughter of his brother Walter William Wellard.

Property title: Arthur Charles Vince

=== Arthur Charles Vince ===
Initially, Vince was a butcher. On 4 December 1915, Vince was the plaintiff in a court case claiming £27/10 against the Hobart Meat Supply So., in the civil sittings of the Supreme Court. On 24 October 1923, Vince filed a petition for liquidation of his affairs. On 26 August 1930 he was the plaintiff in a case against Thomas Adams, accusing him of theft of various items, including several fowls.

Vince was not a good driver. He pled guilty to driving an unlicensed motor vehicle and for not stopping at an intersection, on 22 May 1931. On 7 August 1932, Arthur Vince was involved in a serious traffic accident on the Huon Highway, when his milk lorry collided with Benjamin Kyle Price's car. Vince's wife, Eva Ellen Vince, attempted to sue Price for damages on grounds of negligent driving. On 6 December 1935, Arthur Vince was fined for driving a motor vehicle with insufficient brakes. On 3 June 1935, Arthur Charles Vince was involved in another accident on the Huon Highway, again while driving his milk lorry. On this occasion he collided with Mrs T. Fitzgerald's car. On 3 December 1941, Arthur (or his son by the same name) was charged with driving his milk lorry at an excessive speed (60 mph) and also for driving his tractor (with spiked wheels) on the Huon Highway.

On 8 June 1943, Vince gave evidence at a Milk Inquiry Committee at Parliament House, Hobart. On 9 February 1944, Vince was fined for selling milk which was of insufficient standard. On 18 October 1944, Vince used his lorry to transport milk from Thomas Henry Tennant's dairy farm to Hobart, for sale by an agent. Tennant was charged with diluting the milk with 18% water, prior to it being transported by Vince. Vince was not found guilty. On 20 October 1948, Eva Helen Vince died, survived by her husband, Arthur, and children, Arthur and Barbara. Eva's estate was transferred to her husband, Arthur. On 18 February 1952, Arthur was charged with cruelty for failing to prevent 5 of 13 head of cattle from falling off the tray of his lorry, thus causing death to 2 of the cattle. The magistrate eventually dismissed the charge, saying it was a borderline case.

Property title: Norfolk John Wise

=== Norfolk John Wise ===
Norfolk John Wise married Elizabeth Reid McDowell on 7 June 1899. The Governor General appointed Wise a Special Magistrate of the Commonwealth of Australia, for the purposes of the Invalid and Old-age Pensions Act 1908–1918. He died 5 April 1944.

=== Barclay Gray ===
Barclay commissioned a survey for phosphate rock on the island in 1941.

== Gallery ==
=== Historic photographs ===
North coast (25 April 2013)

West coast (Date unknown – between 1940 and 1970??): Libraries Tasmania - AA375-1-888

== Original extended quotations ==
- European settlement
  - Flinders on his impressions of Smooth Island:
    - "[They] moved on to another island which, from a distance, appeared unusually attractive. At close quarters, the island seemed every bit as beautiful as it did from afar. Its surface was smooth and the texture of its soil contained a richness which is rarely found in uncultivated land. It was estimated that there must have been at least one hundred acres of good, yielding agricultural ground. But the unhappy and unforeseen part of this seemingly natural course taken by the sloop was the denial of the sighting by the ship's personnel of an isthmus which would have been of great importance to them. But "Smooth Island", as they so aptly named it, was indeed delectable and afforded them two delightful days in exploring its scenery and absorbing its charm and beauty. They observed that the Aborigines paid this scenic spot many visits because of its garden-like qualities as compared with the stony-like terrain of the mainland which, although well-wooded and contained many kangaroos, seemed harsh and uninviting in comparison to their "Garden Island", a title it eventually acquired."
  - Flinders on the terrain and native visits:
    - "The country on the eastern side of the bay, is stony; and, wherever we landed, is wretchedly barren. The islands have a better appearance. Smooth Island, contains about one hundred acres of ground, that might answer for a garden: its soil is shallow and sandy." "The natives of Frederick Henry Bay, have some mode of conveyance by water; for they had visited Betsey's Island, the Isle of Caves, Smooth Island, and Gull Island; and, perhaps, the others. It has been a received opinion, that the inhabitants of this part of Van Diemen's Land have no canoes; and, had our observations been confined to the Derwent River, we should have joined in that opinion."
  - Flinders on the characteristics of Smooth Island:
    - "Smooth Island [...] is three-quarters of a mile long, and covered with grass and a few small trees. It has been visited by the natives, as had the Isle of Caves; but from the eggs of gulls found upon both, I judge they do not go often."
    - "Of the four islands in the bay, Smooth and Gull islands were found superior in fertility to the mainland: the first contains about 40 acres [16 ha] of tolerable pasturage."
  - Flinders' voyage narrative on the sloop Norfolk:
    - "In the afternoon we weighed and steered for a smooth beautiful looking island up the opening which bore from E.5°.30' to 10°.40' south from the Isle of Caves; and measured another base in the same manner as before; their distance asunder is five miles and three-quarters. On landing upon this smooth island in the evening we did not find the goodness of the soil equal to its appearance: it would however make a fine large Garden, there being more than a hundred acres of culturable ground upon it. December. 16. Sunday. In the morning I again landed to take bearings from another part of the island; after which, we weighed and ran to the south side of a point which lays one mile and a half to the S.Eward; the wind fresh from the Northward. From a hill, that stands a little within this point, I had a good view of the form of the bay in its neighbourhood. Monday. 17th. In the evening we ran round to the north side of the point, there being every appearance of a southerly Gale coming on; but it continued moderate, and in the morning we landed upon the Islet called Gull Island in the chart."
