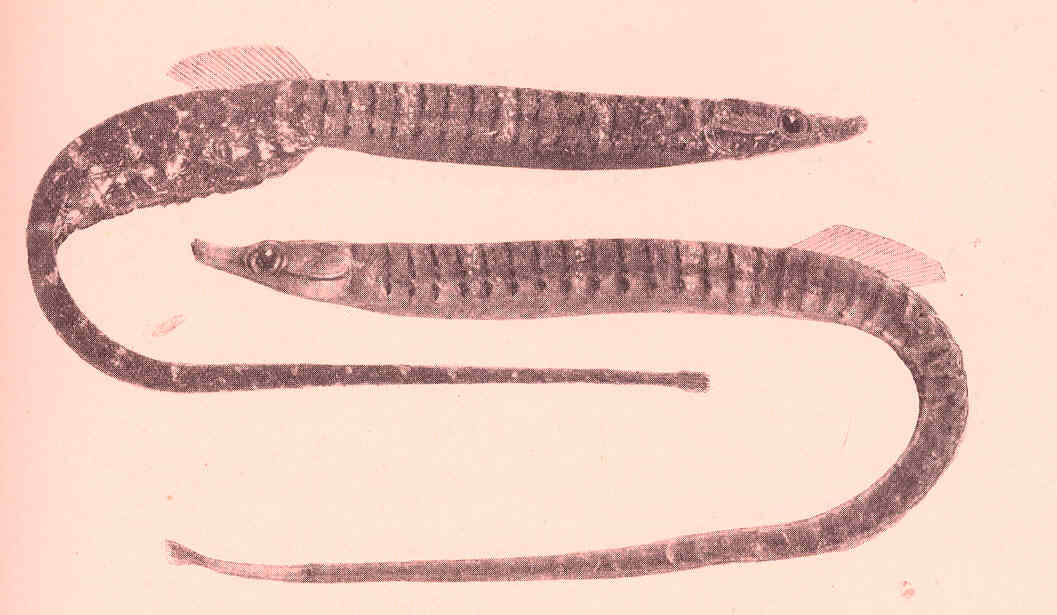
- Vanacampus vercoi

Scientific classification
- Kingdom: Animalia
- Phylum: Chordata
- Class: Actinopterygii
- Order: Syngnathiformes
- Family: Syngnathidae
- Subfamily: Syngnathinae
- Genus: Vanacampus; Whitley, 1951

Type species
- Syngnathus vercoi Waite & Hale, 1921

= Vanacampus =

Genus of fishes

Vanacampus is a genus of pipefishes endemic to the ocean waters around the Australian coasts.

== Species ==
The currently recognized species in this genus are:

- Vanacampus margaritifer (W. K. H. Peters, 1868) (mother-of-pearl pipefish)
- Vanacampus phillipi (A. H. S. Lucas, 1891) (Port Phillip pipefish)
- Vanacampus poecilolaemus (W. K. H. Peters, 1868)
- Vanacampus vercoi (Waite & Hale, 1921) (Verco's pipefish)
