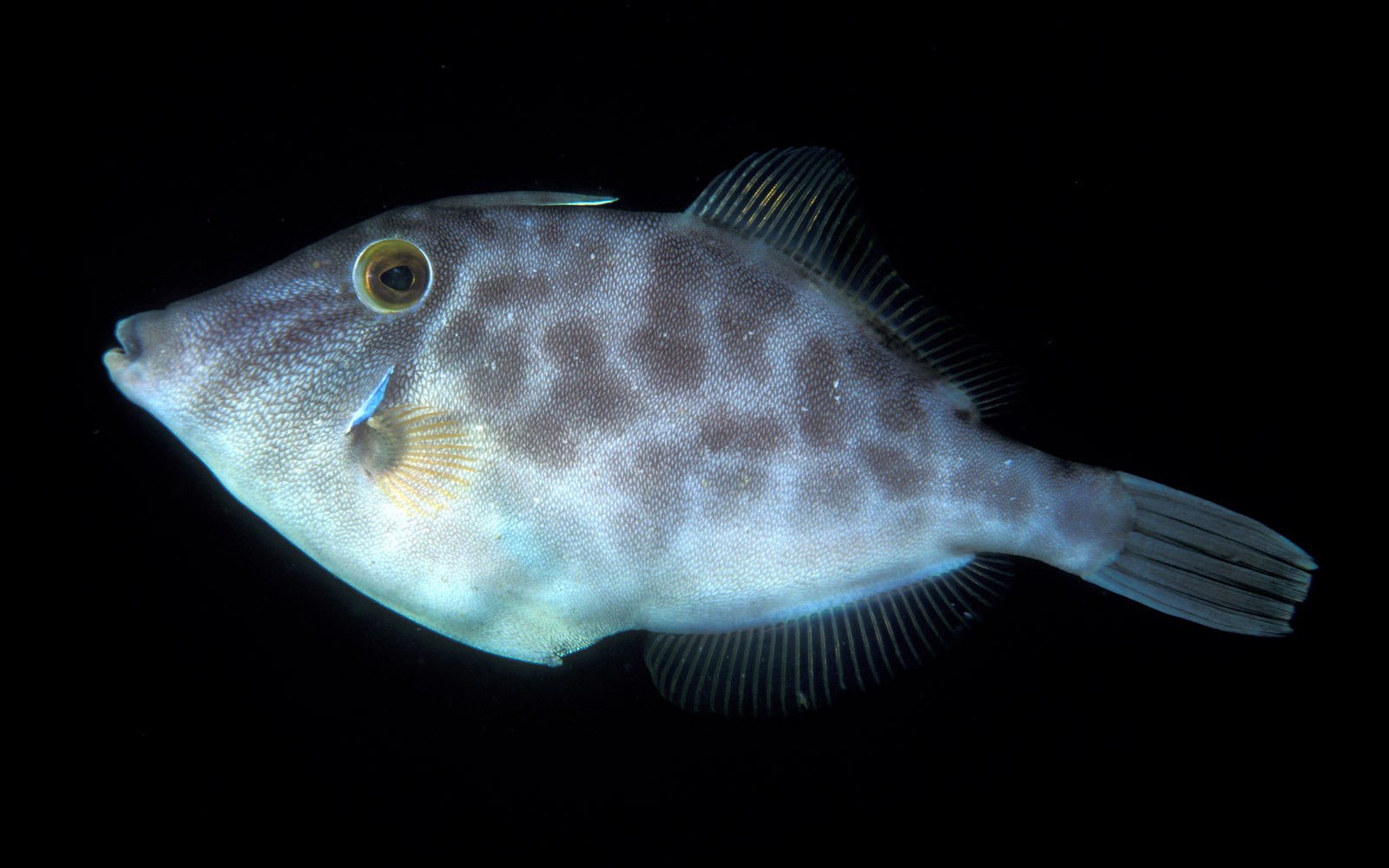

Conservation status
- Least Concern (IUCN 3.1)

Scientific classification
- Kingdom: Animalia
- Phylum: Chordata
- Class: Actinopterygii
- Order: Tetraodontiformes
- Family: Monacanthidae
- Genus: Meuschenia
- Species: M. scabra

Binomial name
- Meuschenia scabra (J. R. Forster, 1801)

Synonyms
- Meuschenia scaber; Parika scaber

= Smooth leatherjacket =

Species of fish

The smooth leatherjacket or velvet leatherjacket (Meuschenia scabra) is a filefish of the family Monacanthidae, found off eastern Australia and all around New Zealand to depths of about 100 m (330 ft), on rocky weedy reef areas. Its length is between 25 and 31 cm (10 and 12 in). In New Zealand it is simply known as leatherjacket as it is the only fish of this family commonly found there, by the Māori language name kōkiri, or by its commercial name cream fish.

== Distribution ==
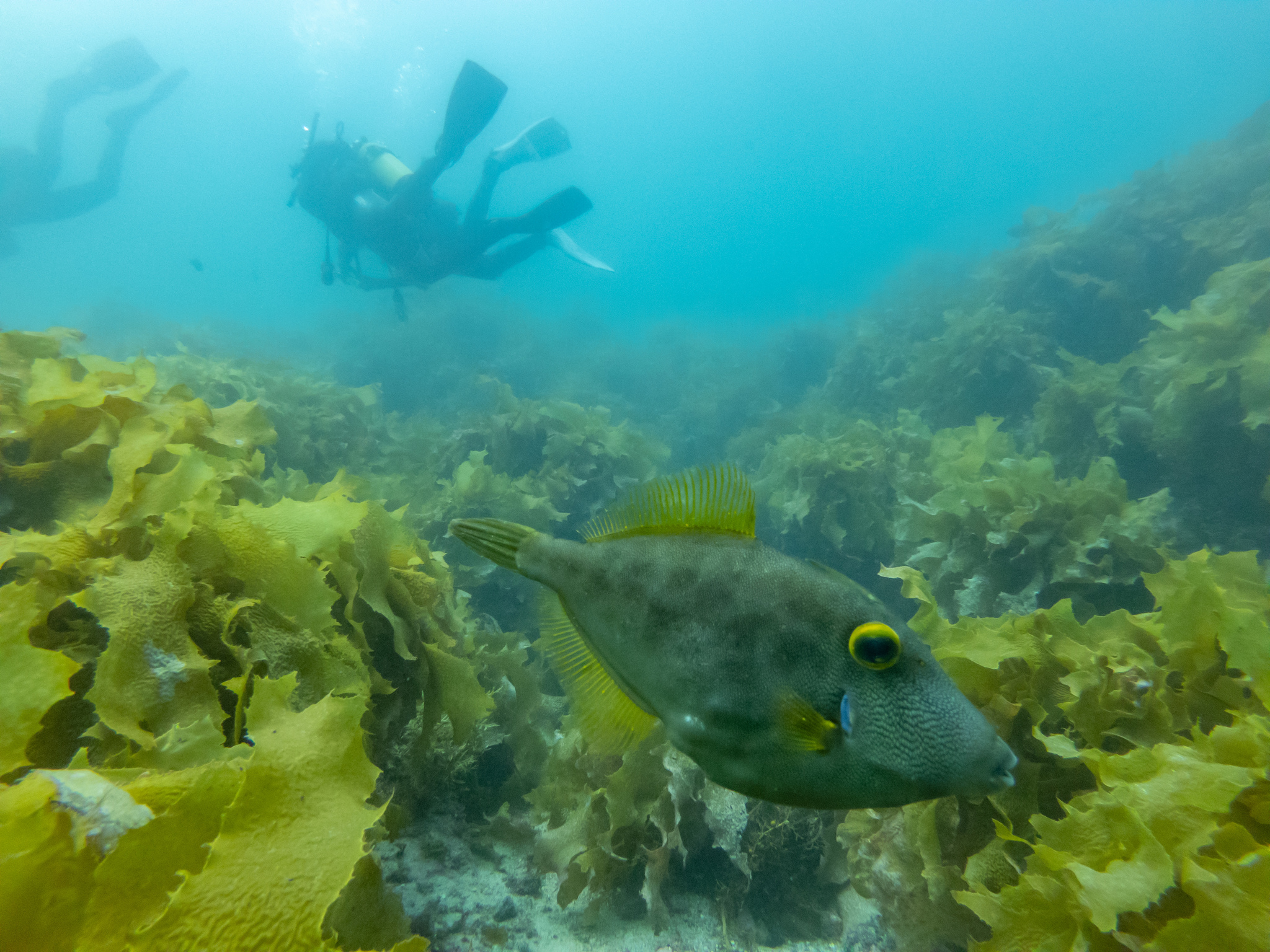
Meuschenia scabra in a kelp forest in the Bay of Islands

The species is found from Cape Naturaliste, Western Australia, to Sydney, New South Wales, around Tasmania, and around the waters of New Zealand.

== Behaviour ==
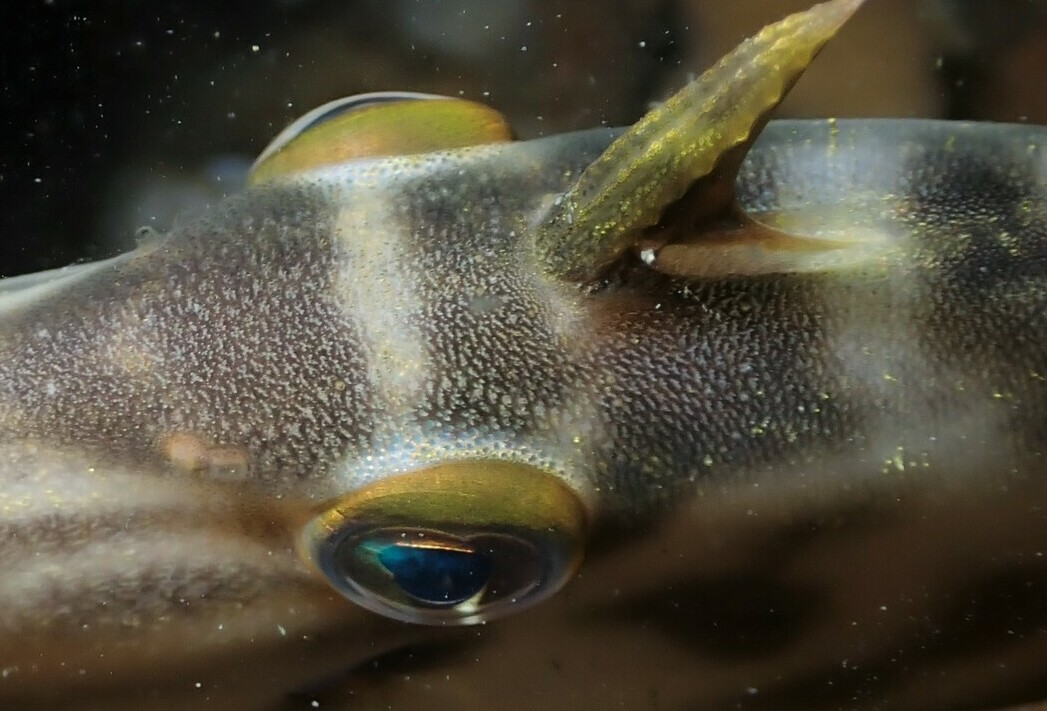
The velvet leatherjacket is known for its sandpaper-like skin

Leatherjackets have a hard, sandpaper-like exterior which they use as a defense mechanism, which causes the fish to swim slowly. Because of this, the diet of leatherjackets is atypical, focusing on slow-moving species such as sponges, sea squirts and barnacles.

Smooth leatherjackets are monogamous.

== In a human context ==
Leatherjackets developed a reputation for being bold among Māori in New Zealand, who named the fish kōkiri, a Polynesian word used to describe species such as triggerfish. The fish was one of the most commonly found in middens from the archaic period of Māori history. Yellowfish liver was known as a delicacy among Māori.

The fish developed a poor reputation among early European fishermen in New Zealand, as the fish would often eat bait without being caught due to their small mouths. The fish were difficult to sell, with many fishmongers removing the heads and skin of fish. Over time, the name cream fish was adopted as a more palatable name for the fish, which boosted sales.

== See also ==
- Leather jack
