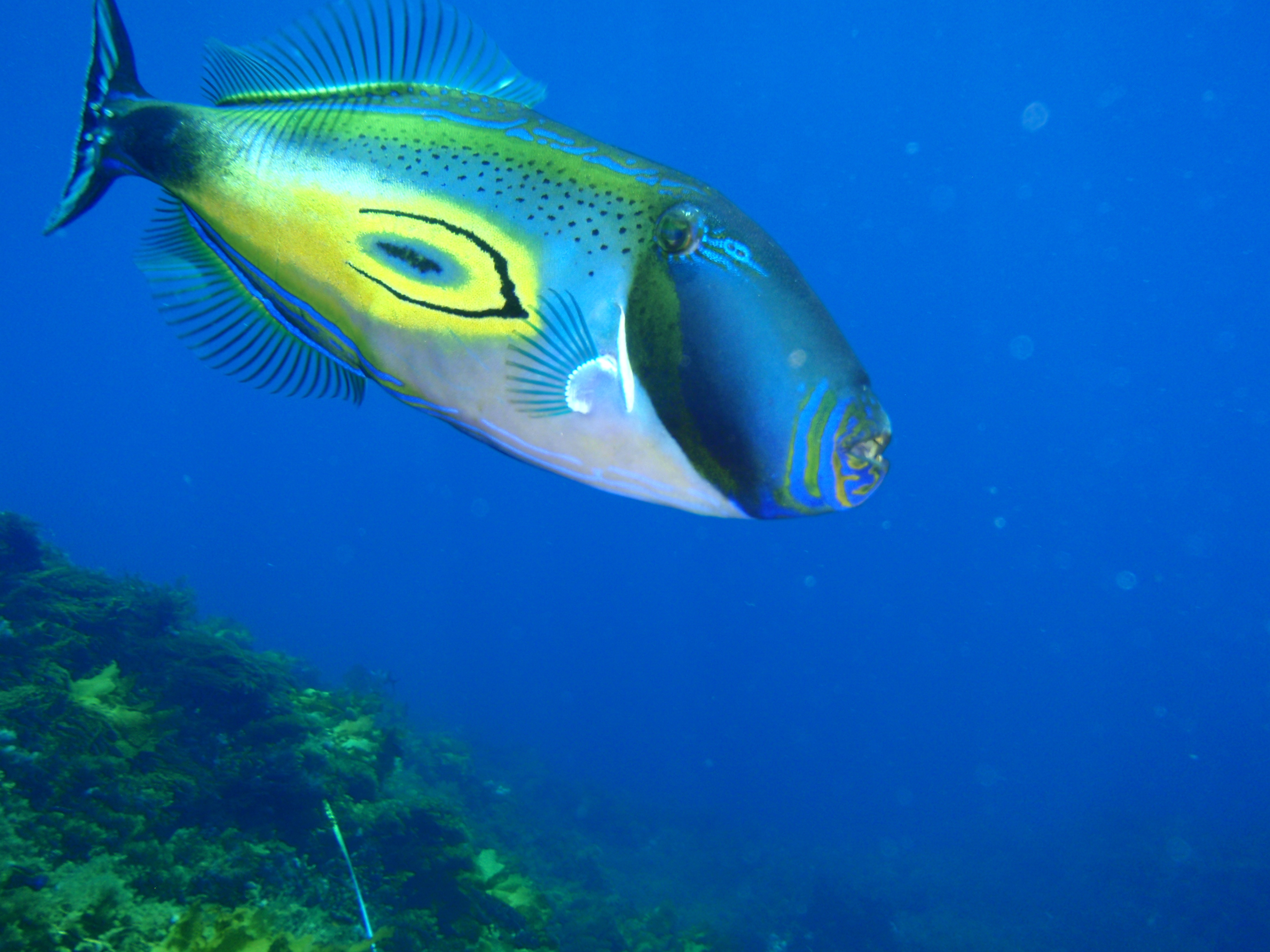

Conservation status
- Least Concern (IUCN 3.1)

Scientific classification
- Kingdom: Animalia
- Phylum: Chordata
- Class: Actinopterygii
- Order: Tetraodontiformes
- Family: Monacanthidae
- Genus: Meuschenia
- Species: M. hippocrepis

Binomial name
- Meuschenia hippocrepis (Quoy & Gaimard, 1824)

= Meuschenia hippocrepis =

Species of fish

Meuschenia hippocrepis, commonly called the horseshoe leatherjacket, is a filefish endemic to the eastern Indian Ocean, in the temperate waters off the south and west of Australia. It grows to a length of about 51 cm (20 in). Its common name comes from a distinct horseshoe-shaped marking on their side. It occasionally makes its way into the aquarium trade.

== Distribution ==
The fish occurs from the Houtman Abrolhos, Western Australia, to Wilsons Promontory, Victoria, and south to Bicheno, Tasmania.

It is often found around rocky reefs, and in deeper bays and estuaries.
