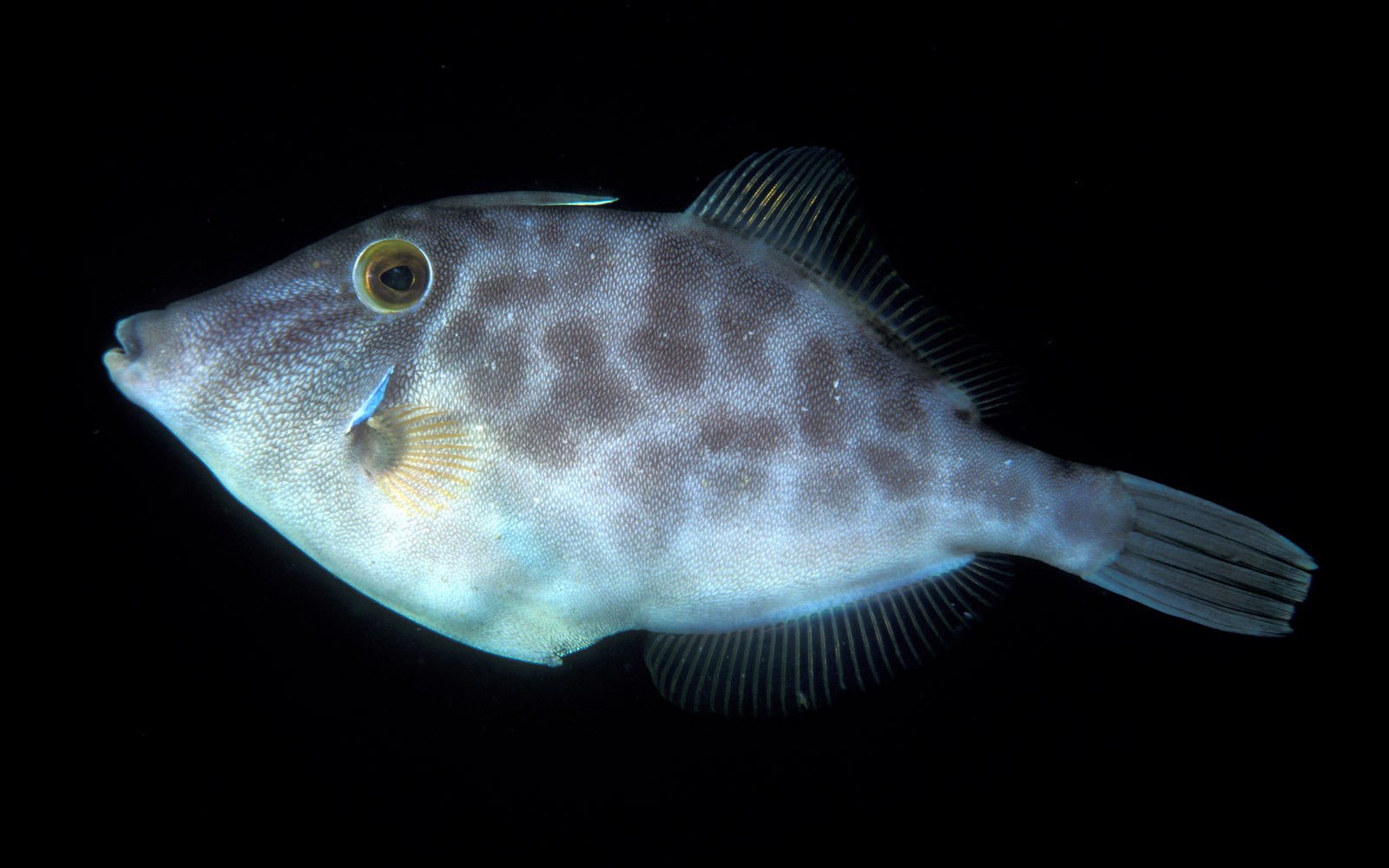
- Meuschenia scabra

Scientific classification
- Kingdom: Animalia
- Phylum: Chordata
- Class: Actinopterygii
- Division: Teleostei
- Order: Tetraodontiformes
- Family: Monacanthidae
- Genus: Meuschenia; Whitley, 1929

Synonyms
- Allomonacanthus (subgenus of Navodon) Fraser-Brunner, 1941; Laputa Whitley, 1930; Navodon Whitley, 1930; Parika Whitley, 1955

= Meuschenia =

Genus of fishes

Meuschenia is a genus of filefishes native to the coastal waters around Australia. There are nine species from the temperate southern half of Australia.

== Species ==
There are currently 9 recognized species in this genus:

Species	Common name	Image
Meuschenia australis (Donovan, 1824)	Southern leatherjacket	
Meuschenia flavolineata Hutchins, 1977	Yellow-striped leatherjacket	
Meuschenia freycineti (Quoy & Gaimard, 1824)	Six-spined leatherjacket	
Meuschenia galii Hutchins, 1977	Blue-lined leatherjacket	
Meuschenia hippocrepis (Quoy & Gaimard, 1824)	Horse-shoe leatherjacket	
Meuschenia scabra (J. R. Forster, 1801)	Velvet leatherjacket	
Meuschenia trachylepis (Günther, 1870)	Yellowfin leatherjacket	
Meuschenia venusta Hutchins, 1977	Stars and stripes leatherjacket	
Meuschenia xanthopterus (Xu & Zhan, 1988)		

== Gallery ==
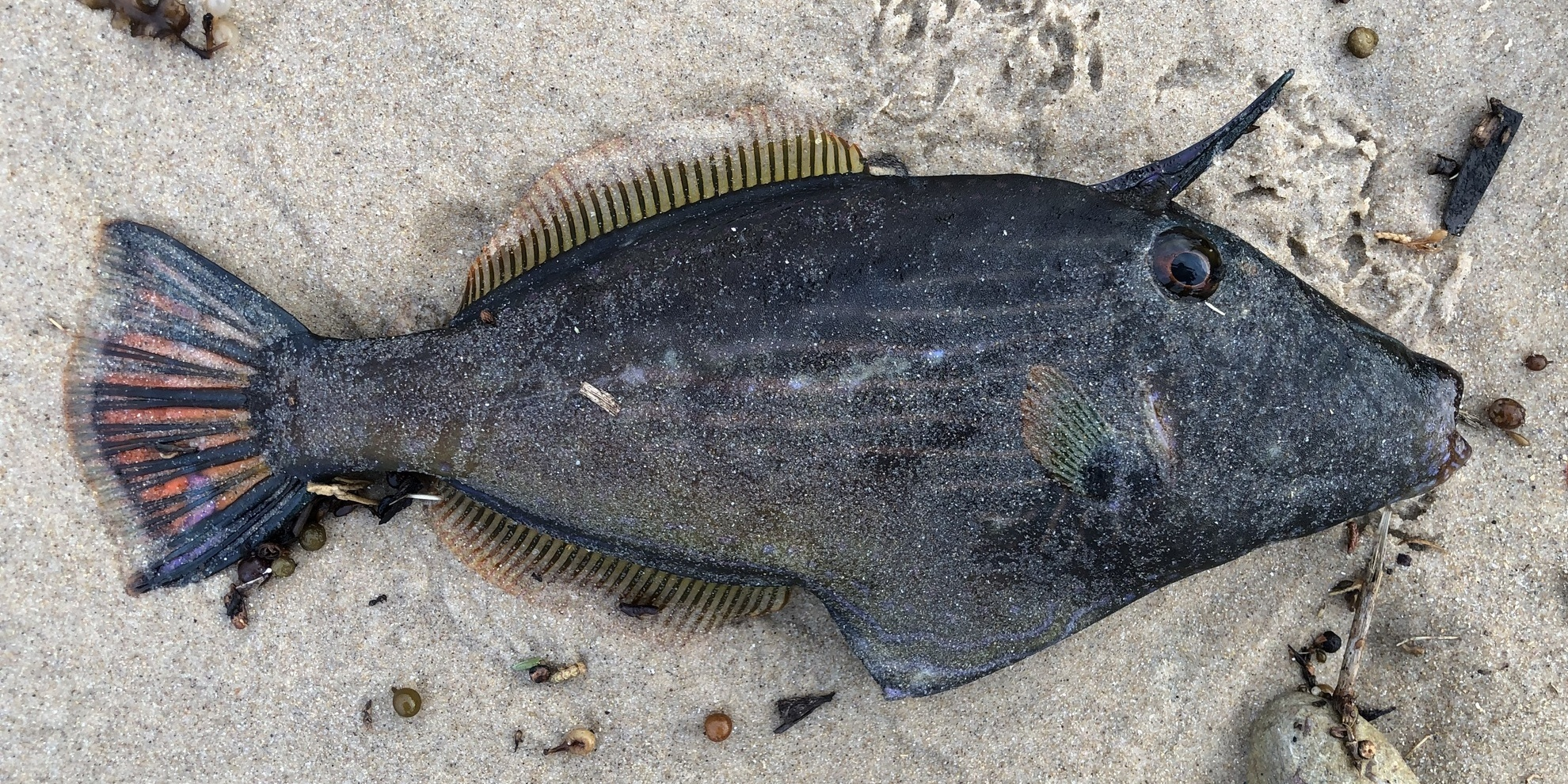
M. galii

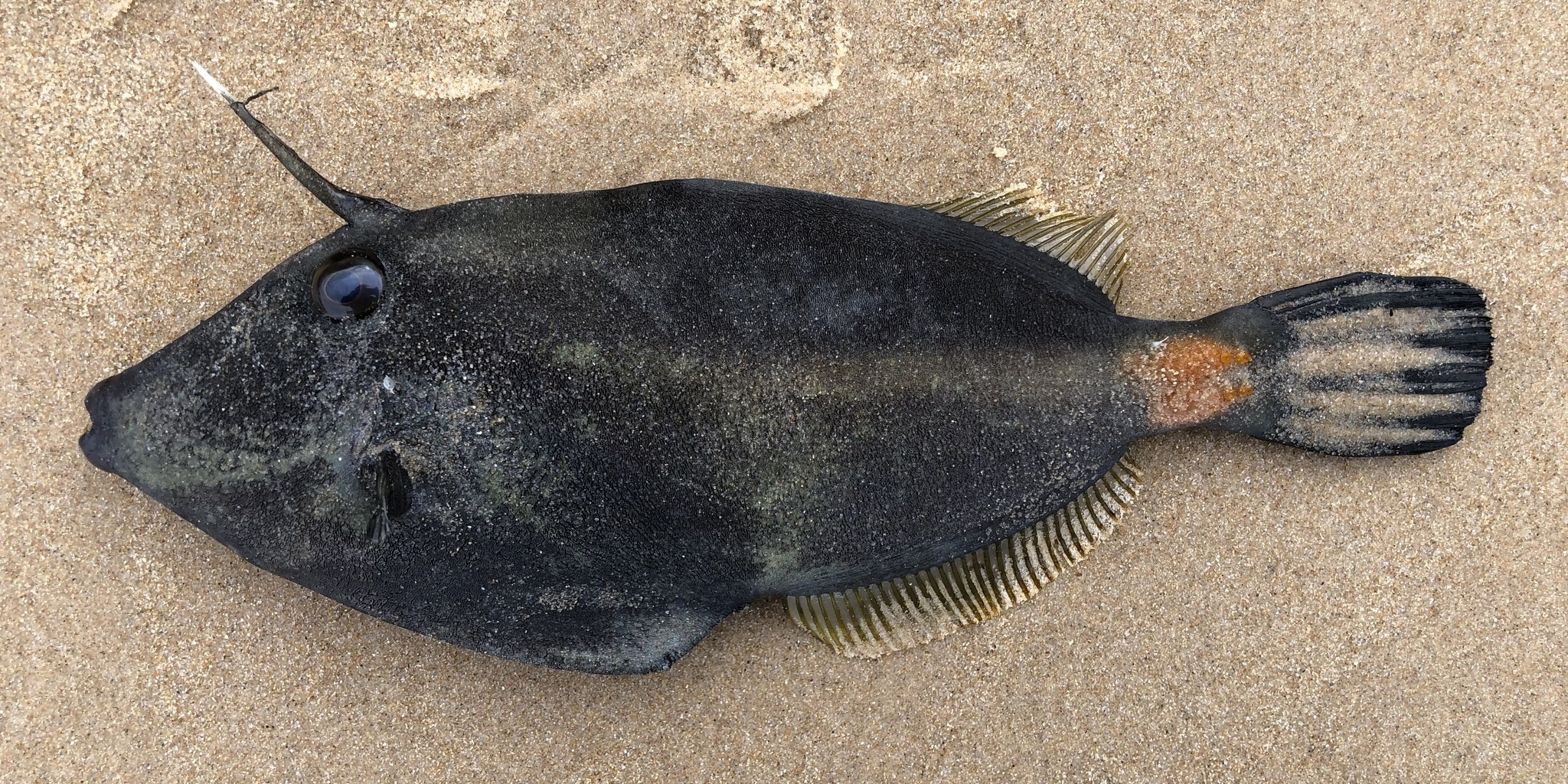
M. flavolineata

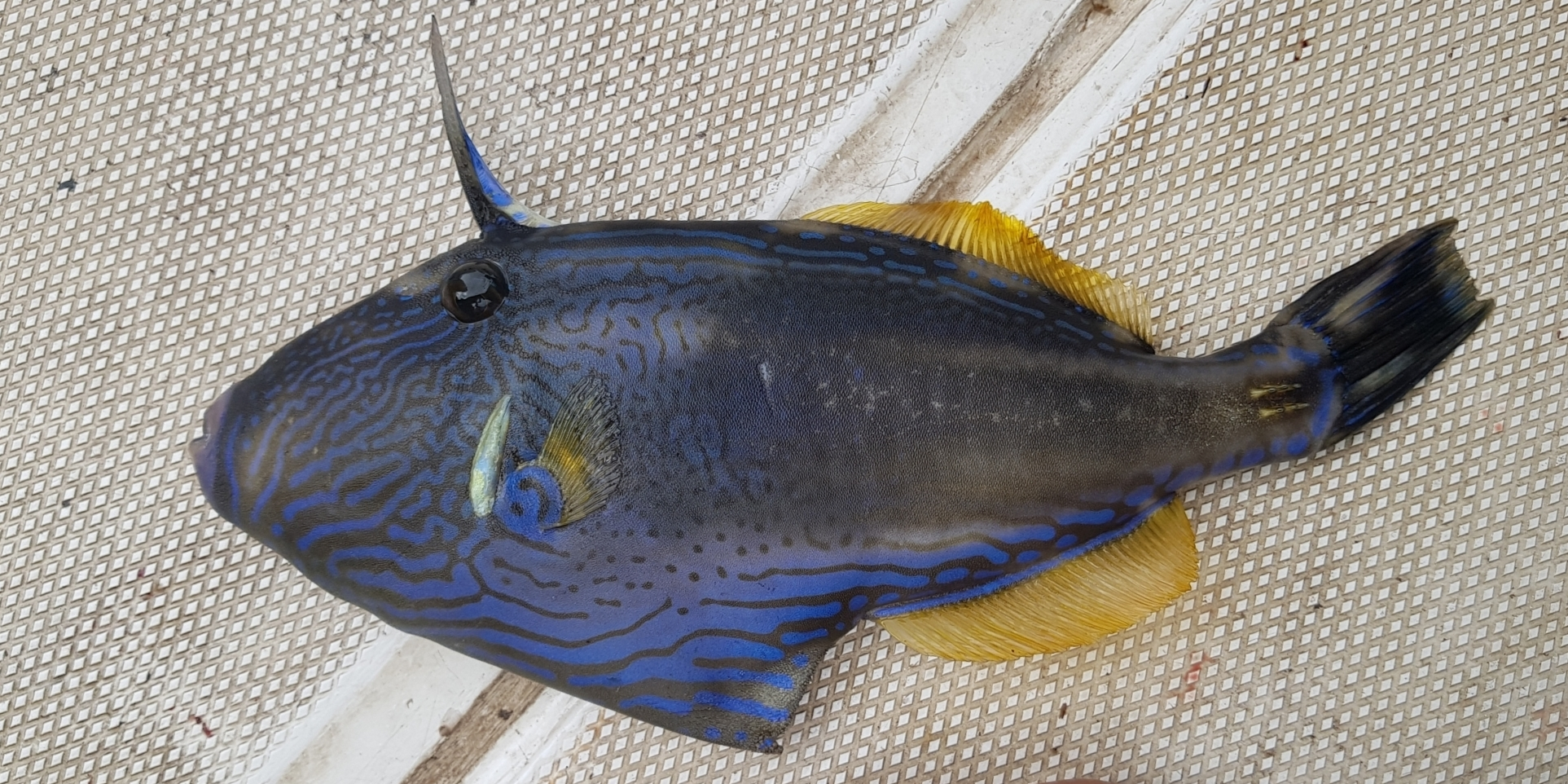
M. freycineti

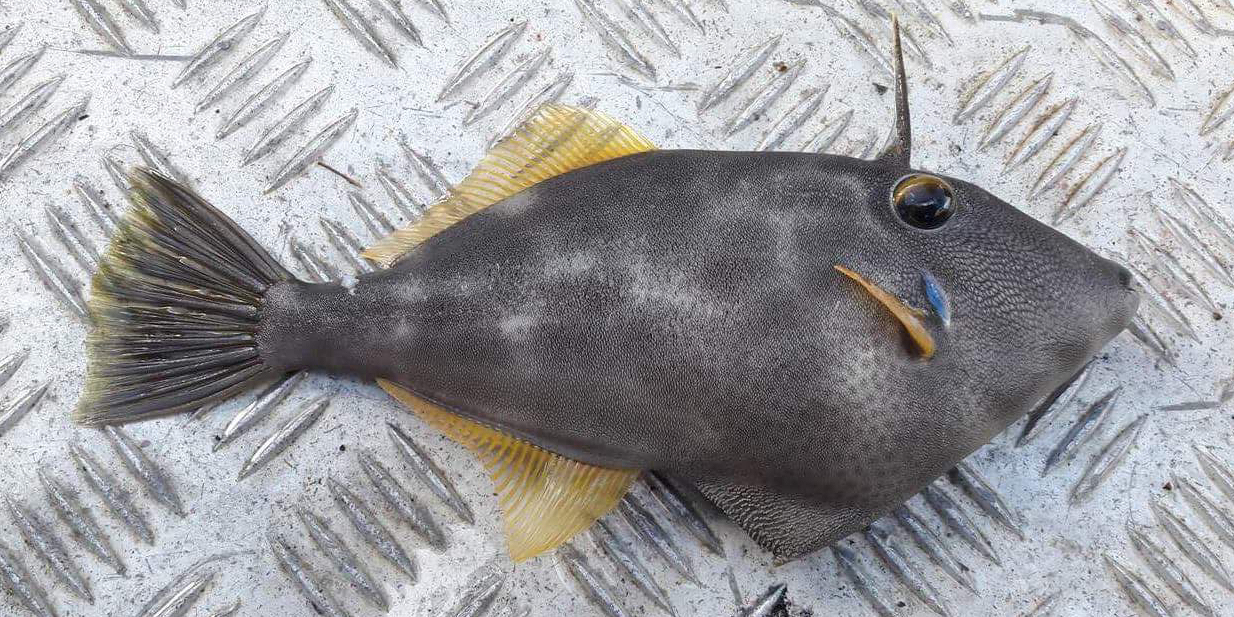
M. scabra

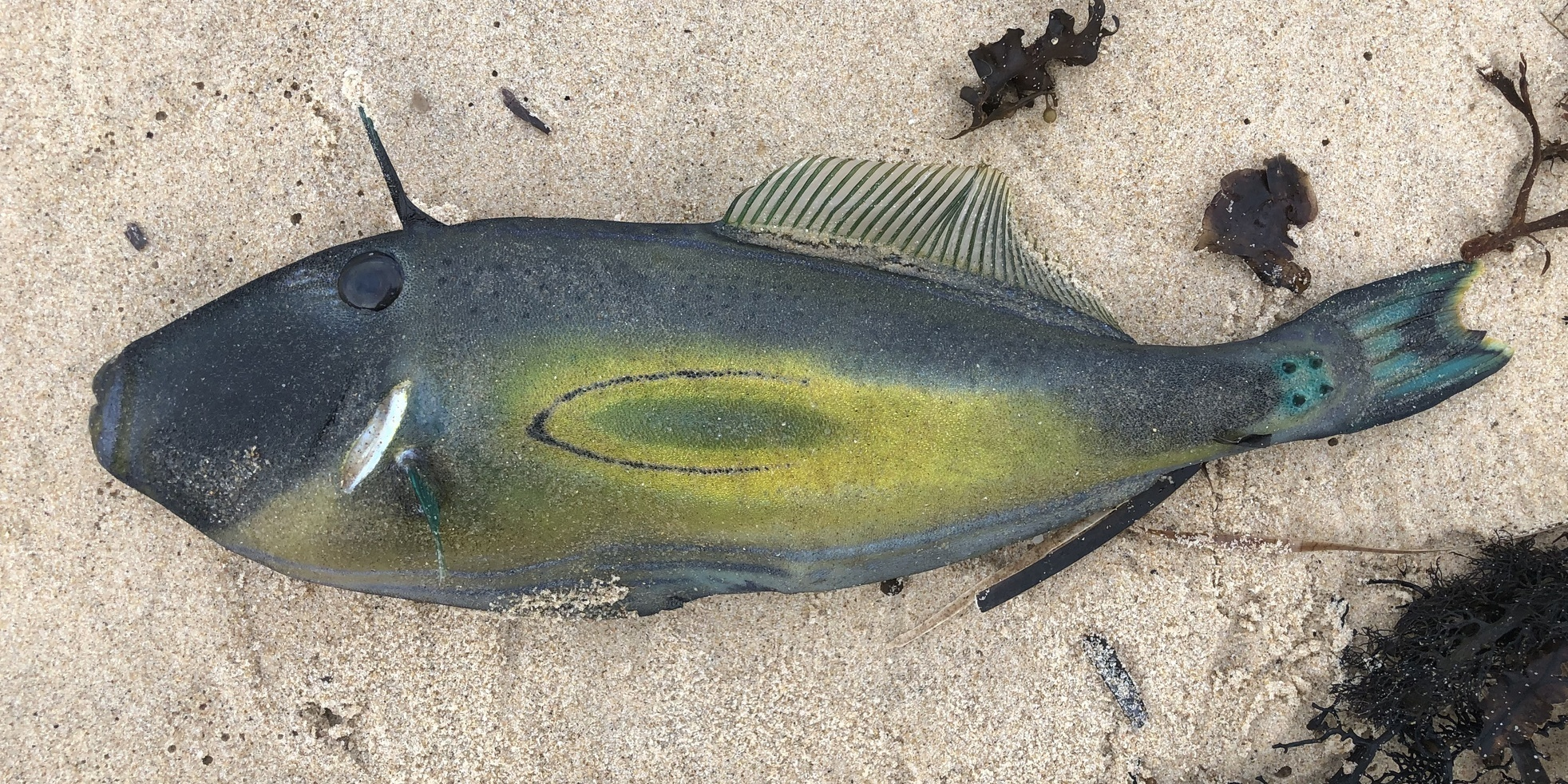
M. hippocrepis

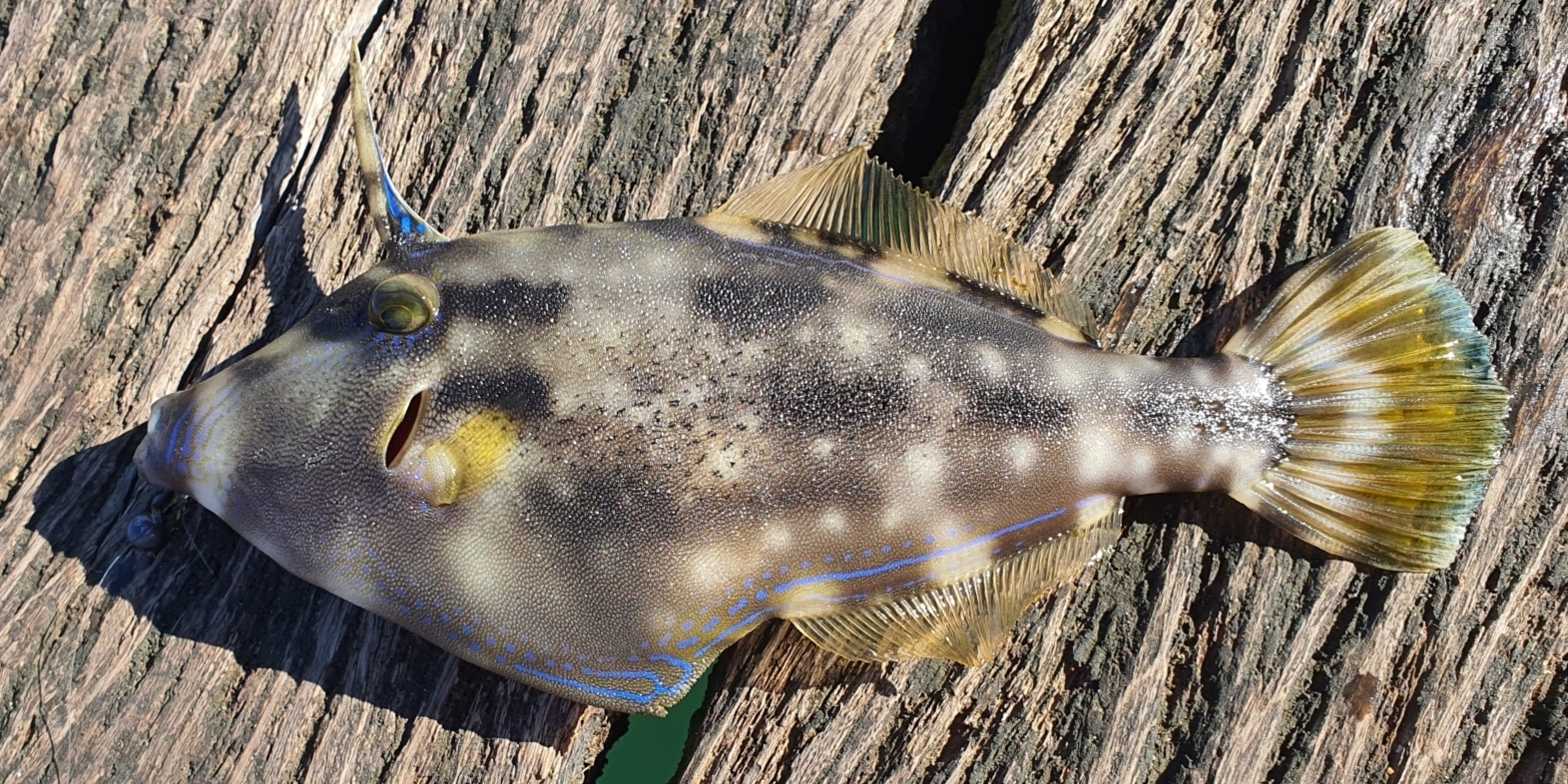
M. trachylepis
