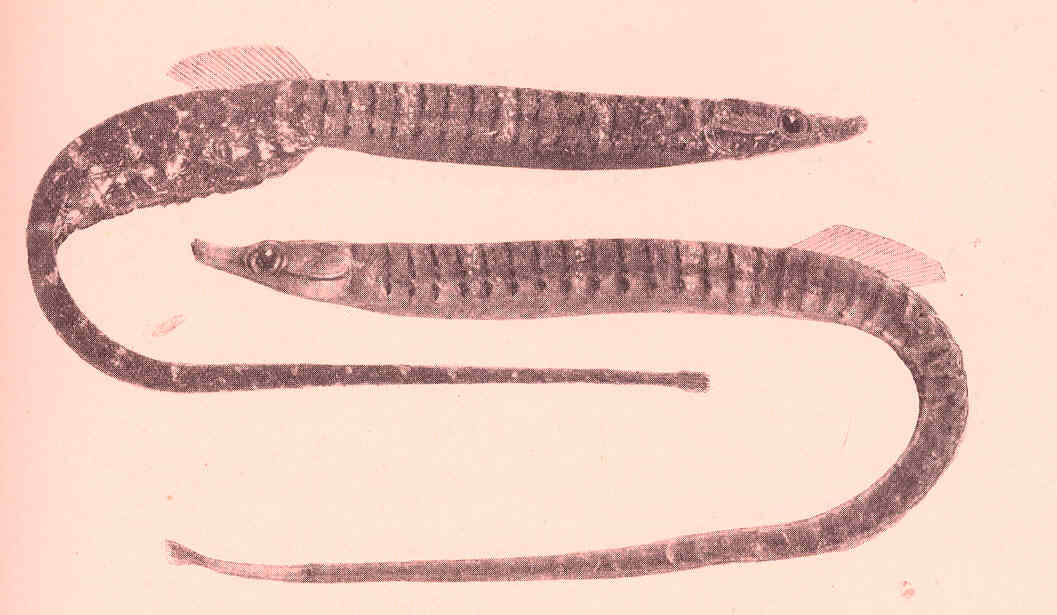
- Syngnathus vercoi

Conservation status
- Least Concern (IUCN 3.1)

Scientific classification
- Kingdom: Animalia
- Phylum: Chordata
- Class: Actinopterygii
- Order: Syngnathiformes
- Family: Syngnathidae
- Genus: Vanacampus
- Species: V. vercoi

Binomial name
- Vanacampus vercoi Waite & Hale, 1921

= Vanacampus vercoi =

Verco's pipefish

Species of fish

Vanacampus vercoi, also known as Verco's pipefish, is a species of marine fish belonging to the family Syngnathidae. They can be found inhabiting seaweed and seagrass beds in addition to tidepools at depths between 2–4 meters from Spencer's Gulf to Encounter Bay, South Australia. Their diet likely consists of small crustaceans such as amphipods and copepods. Reproduction occurs through ovoviviparity in which the males brood eggs before giving live birth.
