= Vanacampus margaritifer =

Mother-of-pearl pipefish

Conservation status
- Least Concern (IUCN 3.1)

Scientific classification
- Kingdom: Animalia
- Phylum: Chordata
- Class: Actinopterygii
- Order: Syngnathiformes
- Family: Syngnathidae
- Genus: Vanacampus
- Species: V. margaritifer

Binomial name
- Vanacampus margaritifer Peters 1868

Species of fish

Vanacampus margaritifer, also known as the mother-of-pearl pipefish, is a species of marine fish belonging to the family Syngnathidae. They can be found inhabiting seaweed and seagrass beds in addition to rocky reefs along the southern and eastern coast of Australia from Brisbane to Perth. Their diet likely consists of small crustaceans. Reproduction occurs through ovoviviparity in which the males brood eggs before giving live birth.
