= King George Sound (Tasmania) =

Sound in Tasmania, Australia

Coordinates: 42°56′45″S 147°50′50″E

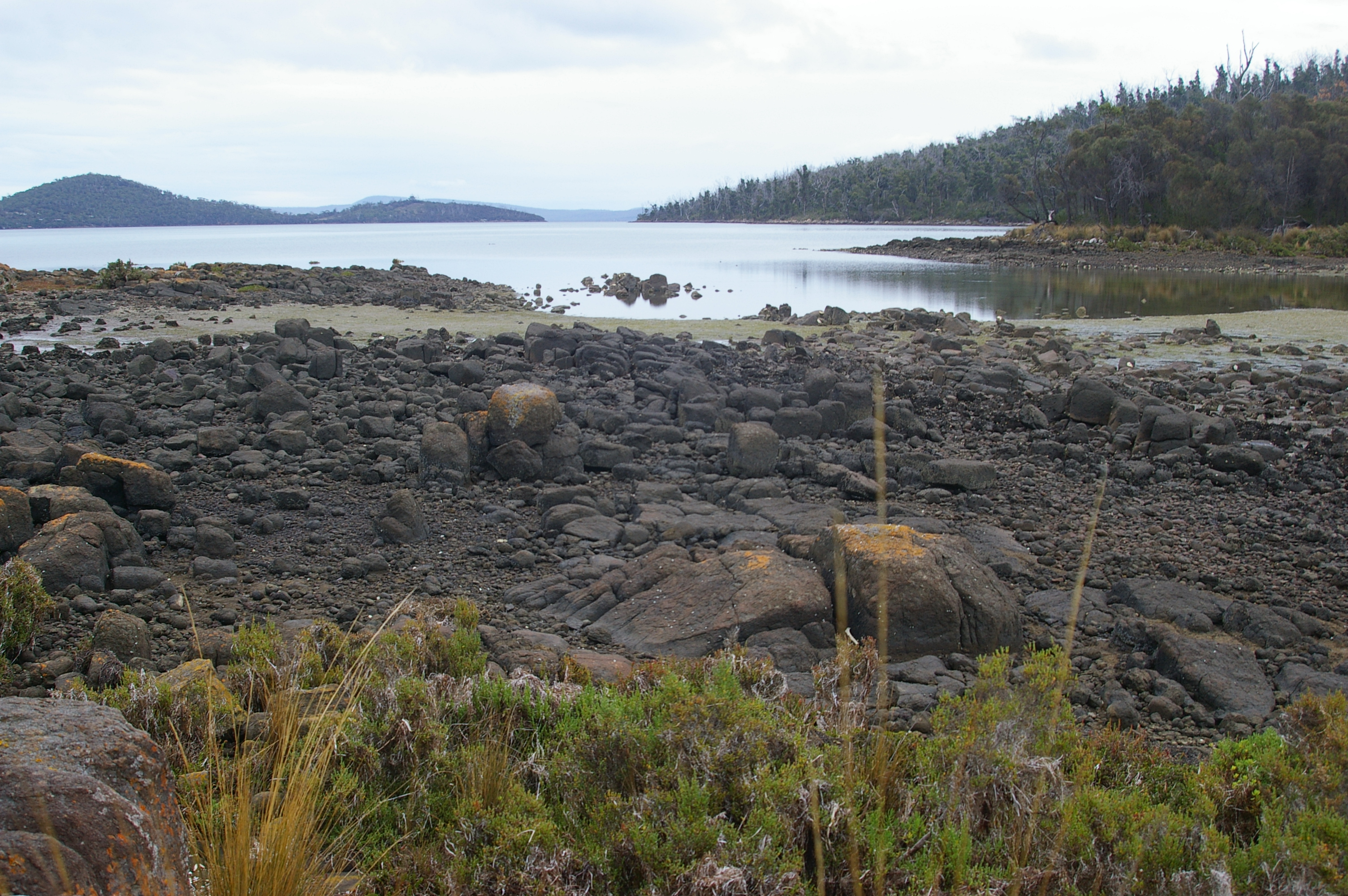
King George Sound

King George Sound, also referred to as King George's Sound, is a body of water within Norfolk Bay, in Tasmania, Australia. It opens into Norfolk Bay at King George Island and extends to the town of Murdunna.

In 1863, a newspaper reported on "an island known as Garden Island, situate in Norfolk Bay and King George's Sound".

The southern part of the mouth of King George Sound lies Flinder's trench, which used to be of significance to the local shellfish industry. There is a shellfish industry in the area, specifically for the Pacific oyster (Magallana gigas).
