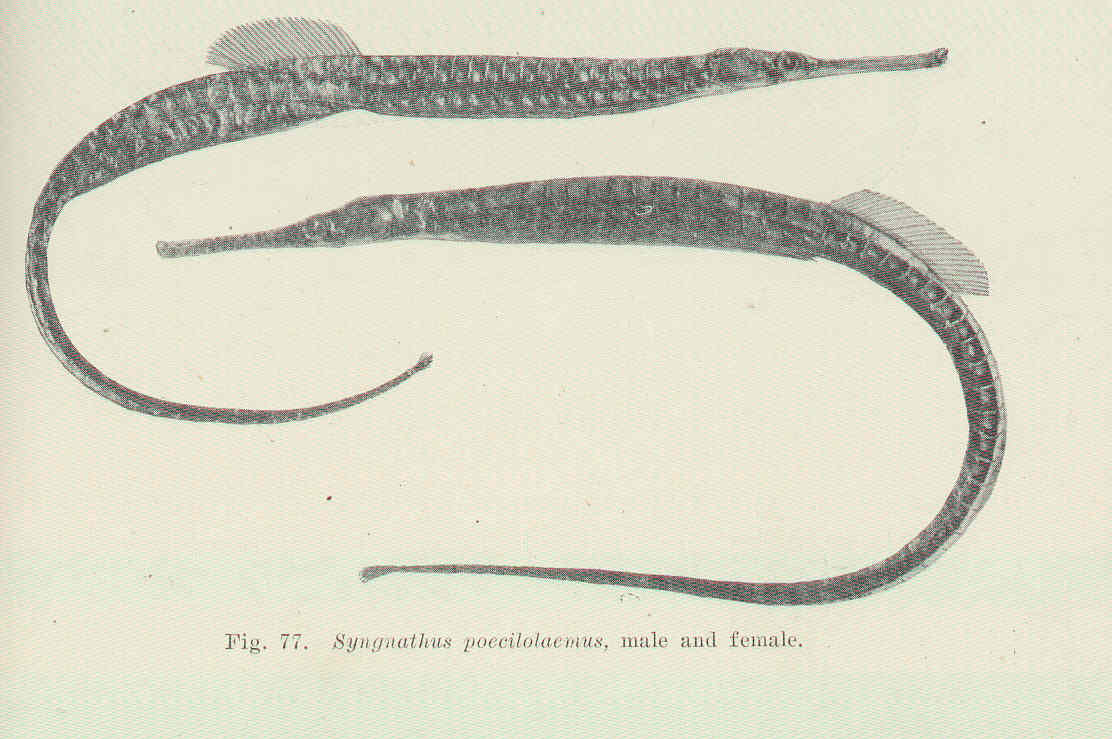
- Syngnathus poecilolaemus

Conservation status
- Least Concern (IUCN 3.1)

Scientific classification
- Kingdom: Animalia
- Phylum: Chordata
- Class: Actinopterygii
- Order: Syngnathiformes
- Family: Syngnathidae
- Genus: Vanacampus
- Species: V. poecilolaemus

Binomial name
- Vanacampus poecilolaemus Peters 1868

= Vanacampus poecilolaemus =

Australian long-nosed pipefish

Species of fish

Vanacampus poecilolaemus, also known as the Australian long-nosed pipefish, is a species of marine fish belonging to the family Syngnathidae. They can be found inhabiting seaweed and seagrass beds of estuaries along the southern coast of Australia including the northern coast of Tasmania. Their diet likely consists of small crustaceans such as mysid shrimps. Adults of this species can reach up to 30 cm in length. Reproduction occurs through ovoviviparity in which the males brood eggs before giving live birth to roughly 40-50 offspring.
