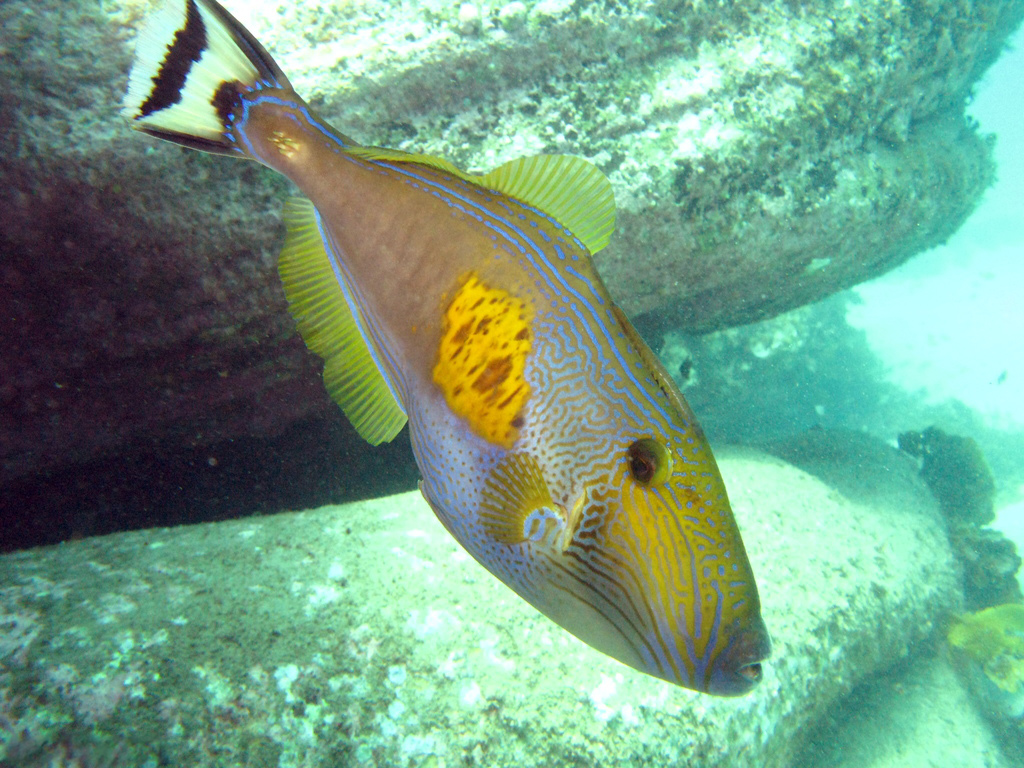

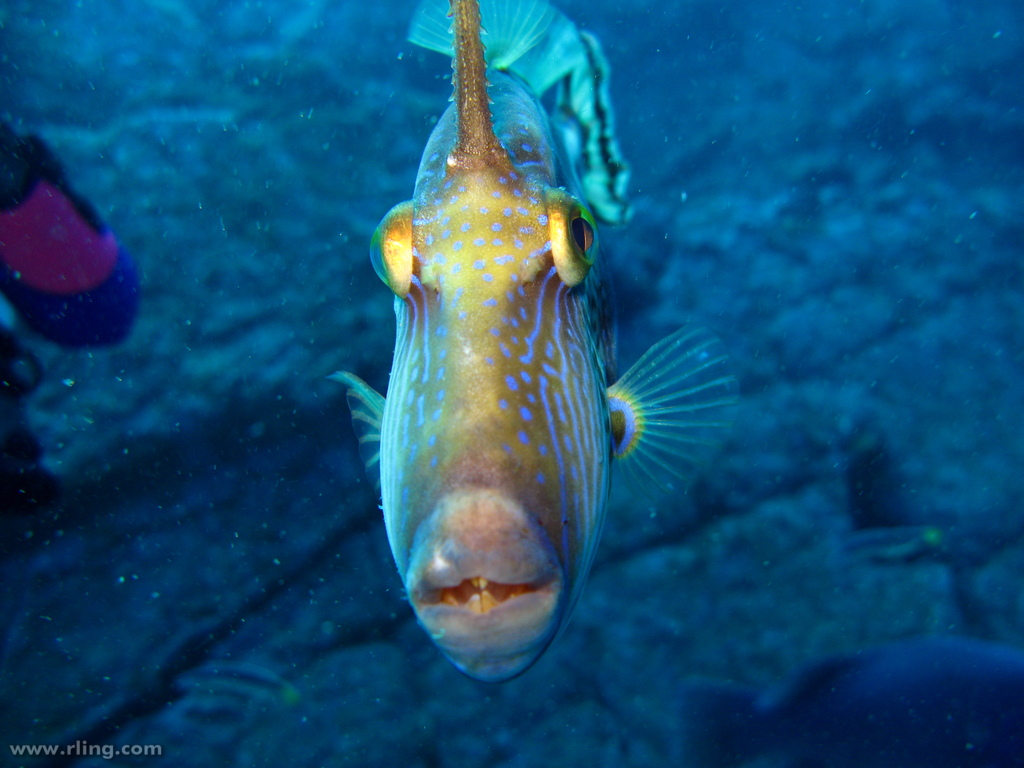

Conservation status
- Least Concern (IUCN 3.1)

Scientific classification
- Kingdom: Animalia
- Phylum: Chordata
- Class: Actinopterygii
- Order: Tetraodontiformes
- Family: Monacanthidae
- Genus: Meuschenia
- Species: M. freycineti

Binomial name
- Meuschenia freycineti (Quoy & Gaimard, 1824)

Synonyms
- Balistes freycineti Quoy & Gaimard, 1824; Meuschenia skottowei Whitley, 1934; Monacanthus multiradiatus Günther, 1870; Stephanolepis freycineti (Quoy & Gaimard, 1824); Thamnaconus frecyneti (Quoy & Gaimard, 1824)

= Meuschenia freycineti =

Species of fish

Meuschenia freycineti, commonly called the sixspine leatherjacket. Other names include, Freycinet's leatherjacket, grey leatherjacket, orange-spotted leatherjacket, reef leatherjacket, six-spine leatherjacket, six-spined leatherjacket, Skottowe's leatherjacket and variable leatherjacket. It grows to a length of about 60 cm (24 in). It is a filefish.

== Distribution ==
It is endemic to temperate waters of southern Australia.
