= Thomas Scott (Tasmania) =

Thomas Scott was formerly the Assistant Surveyor-General of Van Diemen's Land (now Tasmania). He was responsible for a significant survey of Tasmania in 1824 which led to the production of the most detailed map of the region at the time.
