= James Head Quested =

English-born Australian ship owner and trader

James Quested was an Australian pioneer, ship owner, and trader.

Quested owned and traded his ship Boomerang between Tasmania, New Zealand, and Australia. Subsequently, he purchased a butchering business. He owned Smooth Island, near Dunalley. In 1851 he, together with John Rowlands, of Brushy Plains, and a man named Bannan, joined the gold diggings' rush to Bendigo, Victoria, and was fairly successful there. His later years were wholly spent on the Mainland. He migrated from Kent, England in 1821. His family was actively involved with famous bushrangers of Tasmania.

Member Of Pioneer Family Dies In Sydney. Mr James Quested, third generation of a Tasmanian pioneer family, died in Sydney on Saturday. Born on Jan. 14, 1854, he was a son of the late Capt James Quested, who owned and traded the ship Boomerang between Tasmania, New Zealand, and Australia. For many years Mr Quested conducted a butchering business in Sydney. Capt Quested's father, the late Mr James Quested, was a pioneer settler at Brushy Plains (new Runny-mede). Migrating from England in May, 1829, in the sailing ship Mellish (424 tons, Capt Ross), the Quested family landed at Hobart Town after having transhipped in Sydney on Sept. 5. 1829. They resided at Muddy Plains (now Sandford) and the Oak Tree, Cherry Tree Opening, near Sorell, before settling at Guinea Pig farm, Brushy Plains, about 1840. Descendants of the family are legion in Tasmania.
