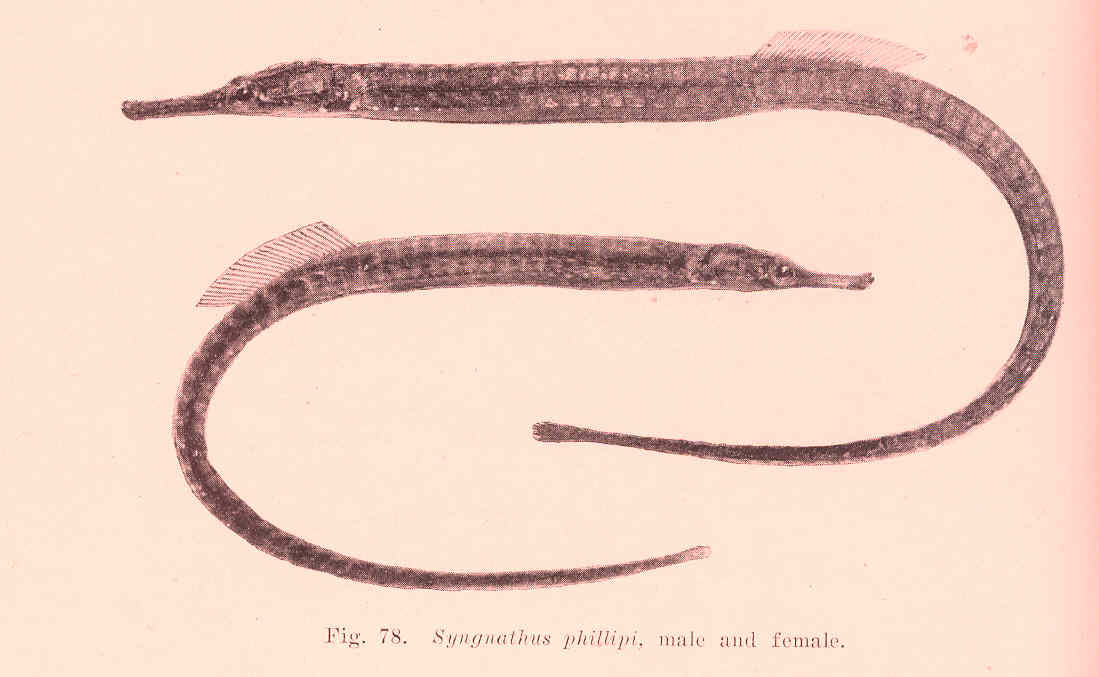
- Syngnathus phillipi

Conservation status
- Least Concern (IUCN 3.1)

Scientific classification
- Kingdom: Animalia
- Phylum: Chordata
- Class: Actinopterygii
- Order: Syngnathiformes
- Family: Syngnathidae
- Genus: Vanacampus
- Species: V. phillipi

Binomial name
- Vanacampus phillipi Lucas 1891

= Vanacampus phillipi =

Port Phillip pipefish

Species of fish

Vanacampus phillipi, also known as the Port Phillip pipefish, is a species of marine fish belonging to the family Syngnathidae. They can be found inhabiting seaweed and seagrass beds along the southern coast of Australia from Perth to Jervis Bay, New South Wales including the coast of Tasmania. Their diet consists of small crustaceans such as copepods, amphipods, and mysid shrimps. Reproduction occurs through ovoviviparity in which the males brood eggs before giving live birth to 50 or less offspring.
