= Flinder's trench =

Coordinates: 42.96472°S 147.83166°E

Flinder's trench is a region within Norfolk Bay, to the south of King George Island (Tasmania), Australia, which used to demarcate the northernmost extent of a region which was rich with mussels and other oceanic invertebrates. This region extended to Smooth Island (Tasmania) and as far south as Taranna. The region was subjected to unregulated fishing practices and dredging, leading to substantially reduced shellfish populations.
