= S. flavescens =

S. flavescens may refer to:

- Salix flavescens, a willow native to western North America
- Scarus flavescens, a parrotfish native to the Atlantic Ocean
- Sesamia flavescens, an owlet moth
- Setophaga flavescens, a bird endemic to the Bahamas
- Silaus flavescens, a perennial plant
- Silene flavescens, a flowering plant
- Sitona flavescens, a broad-nosed weevil
- Solmaris flavescens, a jellyfish with a dome-shaped bell
- Sophora flavescens, a plant used in traditional Chinese medicine
- Staphylinus flavescens, a rove beetle
- Stathmopoda flavescens, a concealer moth
- Stenaroa flavescens, an owlet moth
- Stenospermation flavescens, a flowering plant
- Stigmella flavescens, a Turkmen moth
- Streptostyla flavescens, a land snail
- Styposis flavescens, a New World spider
- Syngnathus flavescens, a seaweed pipefish
