= Storer =

Storer is a surname. Notable people with the surname include:

- Anthony Morris Storer (1746–1799), English man of fashion, politician and collector
- Arthur Storer (1645–1687), America's first colonial astronomer
- Bellamy Storer (Ohio politician) (1796–1875), American politician
- Bellamy Storer (ambassador) (1847–1922), American politician and ambassador, son of the above, husband of Maria Longworth Storer
- Bill Storer (1867–1912), English cricketer and footballer
- Bill Storer (footballer) (born 1942), Australian rules footballer
- Byron Storer (born 1984), American National Football League coach and former player
- Charles Storer (painter) (1817–1907), American painter
- Charlie Storer (1891–?), English footballer
- Christopher Storer (born c. 1981), American filmmaker
- Courtney Storer (born c. 1984), American chef and television producer
- Clement Storer (1760–1830), American politician, senator from New Hampshire
- David Storer (born 1968), English cricketer
- David Humphreys Storer (1804–1891), American physician and zoologist, dean of the Faculty of Medicine of Harvard Medical School
- Dennis Storer (1932–2007), American rugby and soccer coach, head coach of the United States national rugby union team
- Edward Storer (1880–1944), English writer, translator and poet
- Elizabeth Storer:
  - Elizabeth "Biz" Storer, wife and research assistant of American ornithologist Raymond Andrew Paynter Jr.
  - Elizabeth "Liz" Storer, American politician (fl.2023)
- Enoch Storer (1838–1880), English first-class cricketer
- Francis Humphreys Storer (1832–1914), American chemist, professor and dean, son of David H. Storer
- George Storer (1814–1888), English Member of Parliament
- Graham Storer, New Zealand footballer in the 1970s
- Greg Storer, Australian 21st century country music singer, brother of Sara Storer
- Harry Storer Sr. (1870–1908), English football goalkeeper and first-class cricketer
- Harry Storer Jr. (1898–1967), English football player and manager and cricketer, son of the above
- Henry Sargant Storer (1796–1837), British artist and engraver, son of James Sargant Storer
- Horatio Storer (1830–1922), American physician and anti-abortion activist, son of David H. Storer
- Inez Storer (born 1933), American painter and mixed-media artist
- Jack Storer (born 1998), English footballer
- Jackie Storer (1908–1932), English footballer
- James Storer (born 1982), Australian-born Fijian international rugby league footballer
- James Sargant Storer (1771–1853), English draughtsman and engraver
- Jen Storer (born 1961), Australian children's book author
- John Storer (1796–1867), American merchant and philanthropist
- Kyle Storer (born 1987), English footballer
- Liz Storer, American politician who assumed office in 2023
- Maria Longworth Storer (1849–1932), American ceramics painter and entrepreneur, founder of Rookwood Pottery, wife of the politician and ambassador Bellamy Storer
- Maria Henry (died 1795), née Storer, American stage actor
- Melvin Storer (1921–2003), United States Navy shipfitter
- Michael Storer (born 1997), Australian road cyclist
- Norman Storer (born 1933), former motorcycle speedway rider
- Richard Storer (born 1948), English cricketer
- Robert Treat Paine Storer (1893–1962), American football player for Harvard University
- Robert Vivian Storer (1900–1958), Australian venereologist, sex educator, and writer
- Robert W. Storer (1914–2008), American ornithologist
- Sara Storer (born 1973), Australian country music singer
- Stuart Storer (born 1967), English football manager and former player
- Thomas Storer (c. 1571–1604), English poet and mathematician
- Thomas Storer (1938–2006), Navajo American mathematician
- Tim Storer (born 1969), Australian politician and businessman
- Tracy I. Storer (1889–1973), American zoologist
- Trevor Storer (1930–2013), British entrepreneur
