= Storer (disambiguation) =

Storer is a surname. It may also refer to:

- J. Storer Clouston (1870–1944), Scottish author and historian
- Mount Storer, Enderby Land, Antarctica
- Storer Reef, off the coast of South Georgia Island, Antarctica
- Storer Broadcasting, an early 20th-century United States broadcasting company
- Storer College, a historically black college in West Virginia
- Storer v. Brown, a United States Supreme Court case

== See also ==
- Storer House (disambiguation)
- Storer's Regiment of Militia, an American Revolutionary War military unit
