= Robert Storer =

Robert Storer may refer to:

- Robert Vivian Storer (1900–1958), Australian venereologist, sex educator, and writer
- Robert W. Storer (1914–2008), American ornithologist
- Robert Treat Paine Storer (1893–1962), American football player for Harvard University
