= Syngnathus chihiroe =

Conservation status
- Data Deficient (IUCN 3.1)

Scientific classification
- Kingdom: Animalia
- Phylum: Chordata
- Class: Actinopterygii
- Order: Syngnathiformes
- Family: Syngnathidae
- Genus: Syngnathus
- Species: S. chihiroe

Binomial name
- Syngnathus chihiroe Matsunuma, 2017

Species of fish

Syngnathus chihiroe is a species of pipefish which was described in 2017 following the collection of a single specimen in the East China Sea off Yakushima, southern Japan, from a depth of 160–162 metres (525–531 ft). The specimen has different counts of fin rays and a relatively short snout which distinguished it from the only other congener in the area Syngnathus schlegeli.
