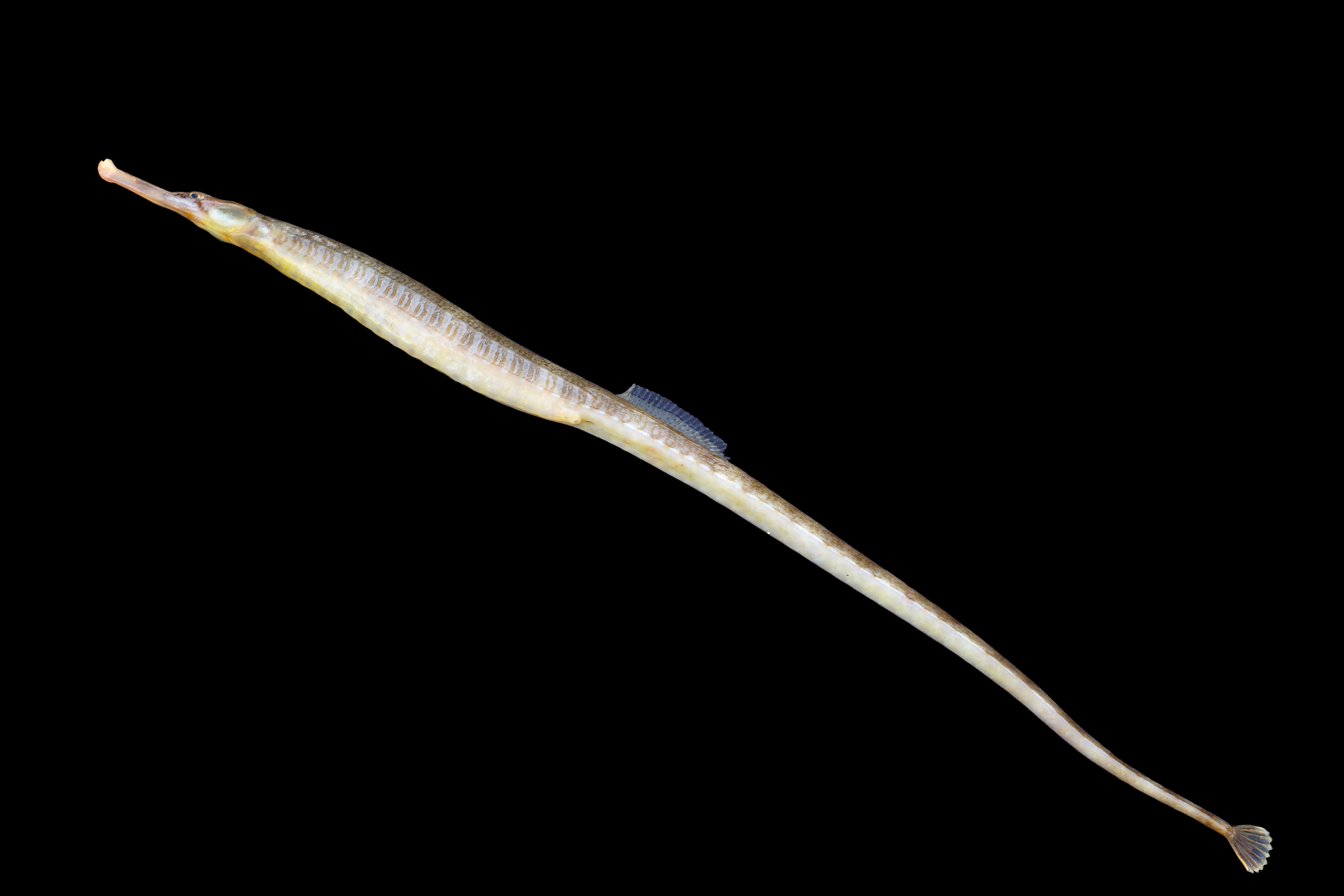
- Syngnathus acus

Scientific classification
- Kingdom: Animalia
- Phylum: Chordata
- Class: Actinopterygii
- Division: Teleostei
- Order: Syngnathiformes
- Family: Syngnathidae
- Subfamily: Syngnathinae
- Genus: Syngnathus; Linnaeus, 1758

Type species
- Syngnathus acus Linnaeus, 1758

Synonyms
- Acus Swainson, 1839; Dermatostethus Gill, 1862; Siphostoma Rafinesque, 1810; Syrictes Jordan & Evermann, 1927; Tigricampus Whitley, 1934; Tiphle Rafinesque, 1810

= Syngnathus =

Syngnathus Temporal range: 33.9–0 Ma Oligocene to Recent

Genus of fishes

Syngnathus is a genus of fish in the family Syngnathidae found in marine, brackish and sometimes fresh waters of the Atlantic, Indian and Pacific Ocean. Fossils of these species are found from the Oligocene to the Pleistocene. They are known from various localities of Greece, Italy, Germany and United States. The name comes from Ancient Greek σύν (sún), meaning "together", and γνάθος (gnáthos), meaning "jaw", referring to the fused jaw that the species (and the entire family) have in common.

== Species ==
There are currently 36 recognized species in this genus:

- Syngnathus abaster A. Risso, 1827 (Black-striped pipefish)
- Syngnathus acus Linnaeus, 1758 (Greater pipefish)
- Syngnathus affinis Eichwald, 1831
- Syngnathus auliscus (Swain, 1882) (Barred pipefish)
- Syngnathus californiensis D. H. Storer, 1845 (Kelp pipefish)
- Syngnathus caribbaeus C. E. Dawson, 1979 (Caribbean pipefish)
- Syngnathus carinatus (C. H. Gilbert, 1892)
- Syngnathus caspius Eichwald, 1831
- Syngnathus chihiroe Matsunuma, 2017
- Syngnathus dawsoni (Herald, 1969)
- Syngnathus exilis (R. C. Osburn & Nichols, 1916) (Bar-cheek pipefish)
- Syngnathus floridae (D. S. Jordan & C. H. Gilbert, 1882) (Dusky pipefish)
- Syngnathus folletti Herald, 1942
- Syngnathus fuscus D. H. Storer, 1839 (Northern pipefish)
- Syngnathus leptorhynchus Girard, 1854 (Bay pipefish)
- Syngnathus louisianae Günther, 1870 (Chain pipefish)
- Syngnathus macrophthalmus Duncker, 1915
- Syngnathus makaxi Herald & C. E. Dawson, 1972 (Yucatán pipefish)
- Syngnathus pelagicus Linnaeus, 1758 (Sargassum pipefish)
- Syngnathus phlegon A. Risso, 1827
- Syngnathus rostellatus Nilsson, 1855 (Nilsson's pipefish)
- Syngnathus safina Paulus, 1992
- Syngnathus schlegeli Kaup, 1856 (Seaweed pipefish)
- Syngnathus schmidti A. M. Popov, 1928
- Syngnathus scovelli (Evermann & Kendall, 1896) (Gulf pipefish)
- Syngnathus springeri Herald, 1942 (Bull pipefish)
- Syngnathus taenionotus Canestrini, 1871
- Syngnathus temminckii Kaup, 1856 (Long-snout pipefish)
- Syngnathus tenuirostris Rathke, 1836 (Narrow-snouted pipefish)
- Syngnathus typhle Linnaeus, 1758 (Broad-nosed pipefish)
- Syngnathus variegatus Pallas, 1814
- Syngnathus watermeyeri J. L. B. Smith, 1963 (Estuarine pipefish)
