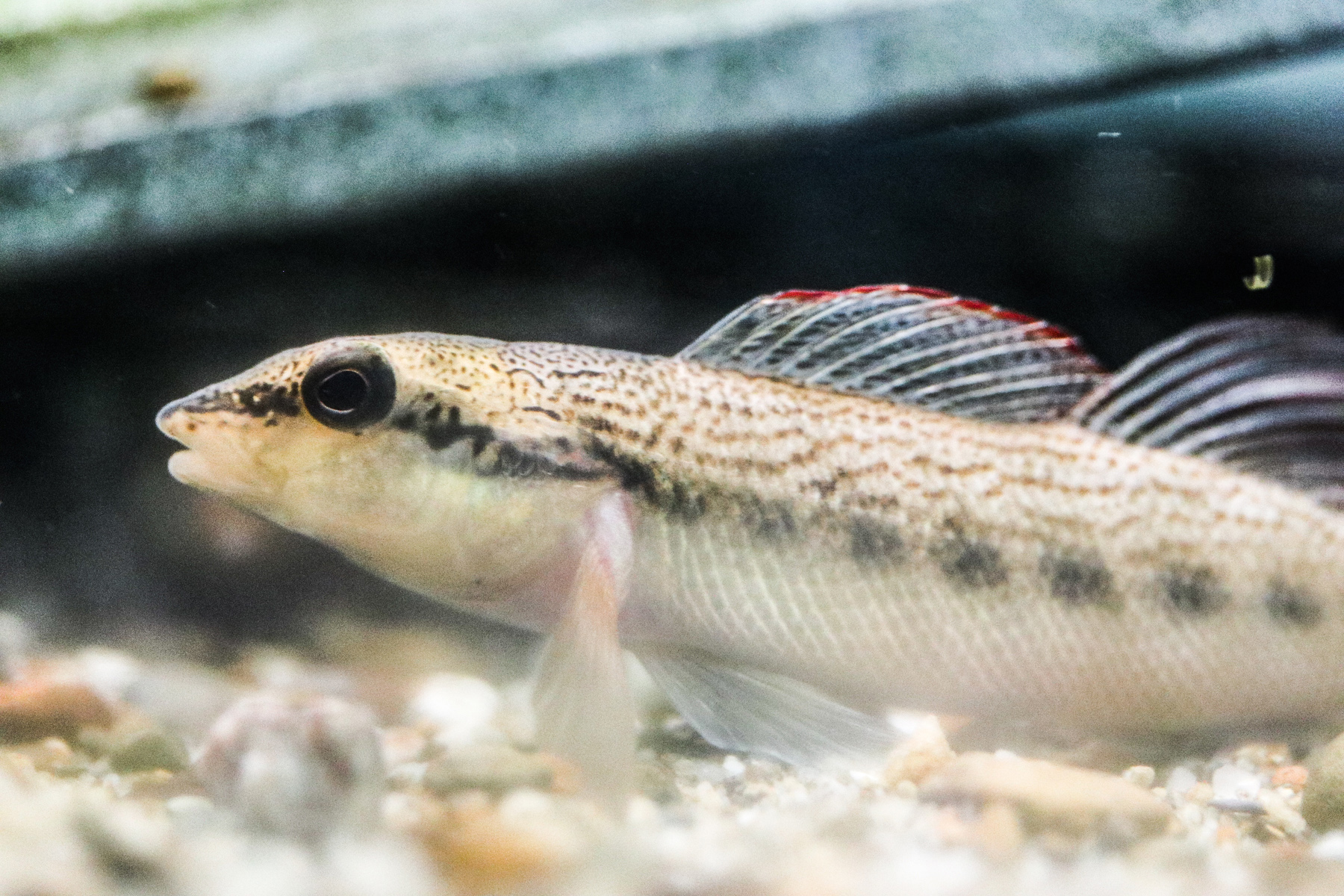
- Ashy darter (Allohistium cinereum)

Scientific classification
- Kingdom: Animalia
- Phylum: Chordata
- Class: Actinopterygii
- Order: Perciformes
- Family: Percidae
- Subfamily: Etheostomatinae
- Genus: Allohistium; Bailey, 1955

Type species
- Etheostoma cinerea Storer, 1845

= Allohistium =

Genus of fishes

Allohistium is a genus of freshwater ray-finned fish which is classified in the subfamily Etheostomatinae, commonly known as the darters, part of the family Percidae which also includes the perches, ruffes and pikeperches. They are found in the rivers of Virginia, Kentucky, Tennessee and Georgia, in the Tennessee River, Duck River and Cumberland River drainages.

== Taxonomy ==
Allohistium was originally erected as a subgenus of Etheostoma. Some authorities still regard Allohistium in this way.

== Species ==
Currently, three species in this genus are recognized:

- Allohistium anas MacGuigan, Taylor, Ghezelayagh, Wood, Simmons, Mollish et Near, 2025
- Allohistium cinereum Storer, 1845 (Ashy darter)
- Allohistium maydeni Powers & Kuhajda, 2012 (Redlips darter)
