= Pelagic pipefish =

Conservation status
- Data Deficient (IUCN 3.1)

Scientific classification
- Kingdom: Animalia
- Phylum: Chordata
- Class: Actinopterygii
- Order: Syngnathiformes
- Family: Syngnathidae
- Genus: Syngnathus
- Species: S. phlegon

Binomial name
- Syngnathus phlegon A. Risso, 1827

Species of fish

Pelagic pipefish (Syngnathus phlegon) is a pipefish species of the family Syngnathidae.

== Distribution ==
This species inhabits the Mediterranean Sea and the Black Sea as well as the nearby waters of the eastern Atlantic Ocean.

== Description ==
This marine pelagic-neritic fish can reach a total length of 20.0 cm. The general shape of the body is very similar to that of congeners like Syngnathus abaster. It is characterized by the presence of spines along the bony rings surrounding the body. The basic color is blue with white belly and a dark spot on each ring.

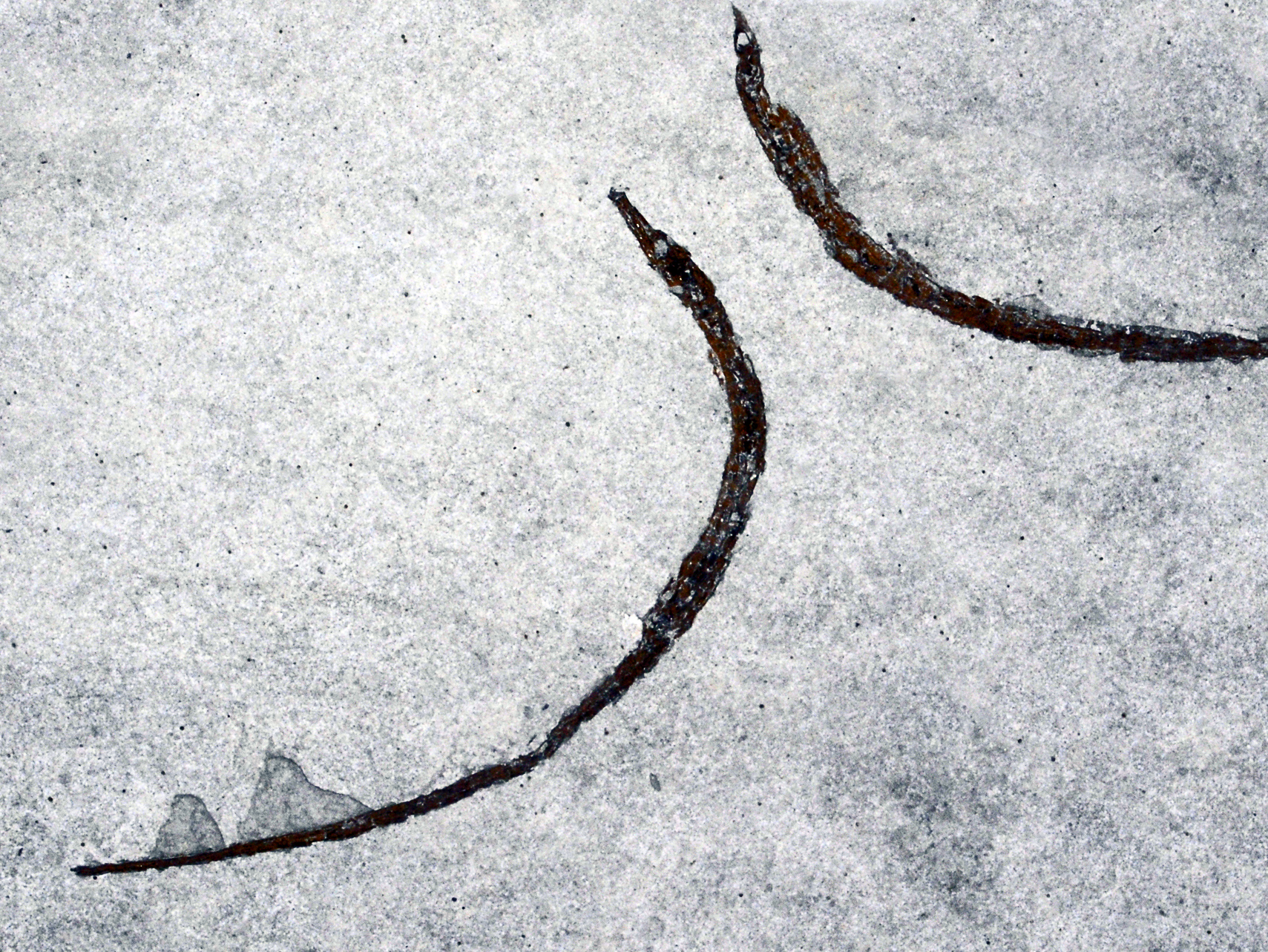
Fossil of Syngnathus phlegon from Pliocene of Italy

== Biology ==
The pelagic pipefish is mainly an offshore species which occurs in pelagic and coastal waters, often in small groups. This species is ovoviviparous: the males bear the fertilised eggs laid by the females in a brood pouch found under the tail.
