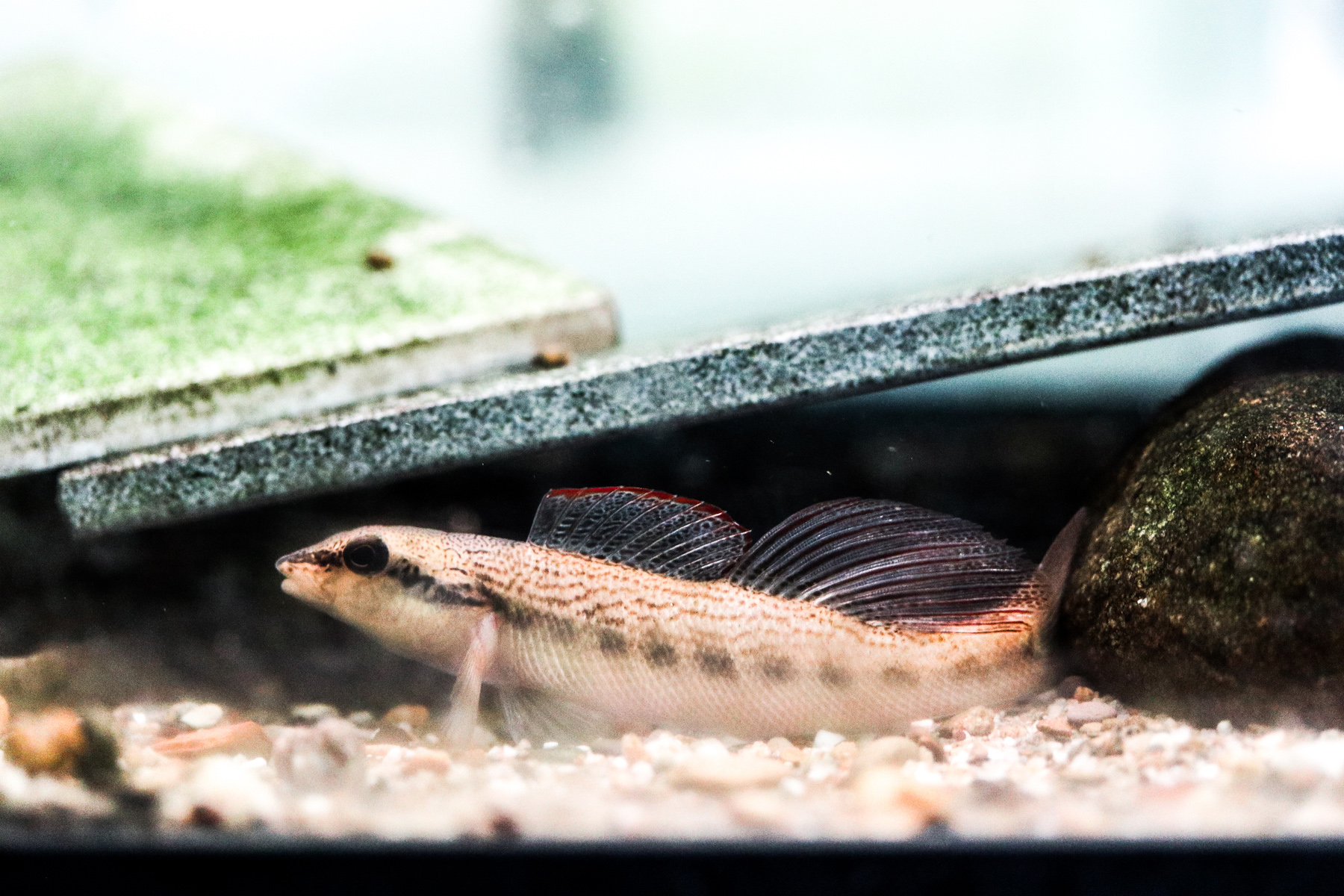

Conservation status
- Vulnerable (IUCN 3.1)

- Imperiled (NatureServe)

Scientific classification
- Kingdom: Animalia
- Phylum: Chordata
- Class: Actinopterygii
- Order: Perciformes
- Family: Percidae
- Genus: Allohistium
- Species: A. cinereum

Binomial name
- Allohistium cinereum (D. H. Storer, 1845)

Synonyms
- Etheostoma cinerea (Storer, 1845)

= Ashy darter =

Species of fish

The ashy darter (Allohistium cinereum) is a species of freshwater ray-finned fish, a darter from the subfamily Etheostomatinae, part of the family Percidae, which also contains the perches, ruffes and pikeperches. It is endemic to the eastern United States.

Populations of this darter in the Cumberland River were recognized by Powers, Kuhadja and Ahlbrand in 2012 as a separate species A. maydeni (Redlips darter).

== Distribution ==
Historically, the ashy darter occurred in varying preimpoundment reaches throughout the Tennessee River and Duck River drainages. Many populations were likely eradicated by anthropogenic causes before discovery. As declines reshaped distributions, only six river systems contained remaining populations; it may be extant in only two. It is considered extirpated from Georgia and Alabama. Populations from the Cumberland River system are presently recognized as A. maydeni.

Notable populations persist in the Buffalo and Duck Rivers in Tennessee, and the Rockcastle and Big South Fork of the Cumberland Rivers in Kentucky. Individuals have also been collected in the Clinch and Elk Rivers of Tennessee over the last 30 years. Specific declines have been observed in the Little River of Blount County, TN, where populations once flourished, but have significantly diminished over the past 30 years.

Declines and extirpations of A. cinereum, like other aquatic species, are often hard to measure and emerge from compounding factors. Causes are generally human-induced, and include runoff from urbanization, agriculture, mining, and logging. These sources of pollution, among others, are commonly referred to as "nonpoint" sources of pollution, because they are often hard to trace and are difficult to resolve. All of these can lead to substantial siltation, which ultimately destroys their preferred habitat types. Another primary factor in declines are impoundments, such as dams, which have drastically reconfigured river and stream dynamics over the past century.

== Ecology ==
Its preferred habitat is relatively shallow pools with languid currents. Thriving in medium to large upland streams, these darters seek areas of minimal siltation over varying substrate, including sand and gravel bottoms. Depths of favorable habitat are 0.5–2.0 metres (1.6–6.6 ft). In addition, they depend on cover such as boulders and water willow to avoid predation; much of their time is spent beneath these various cover types. This darter's primary diet consists of various aquatic insects. In 83 individuals, the stomachs contained chironomids (midges), ephemeropterans (mayflies), and oligochaetes (aquatic worms). Amphipods and isopods have also been reported in E. cinereum stomachs. Although little is known about specific feeding habits, their papillose lips and extended snouts are thought to aid in obtaining burrowing prey from beneath the substrate. Also, their diets and feeding habits have been shown to vary significantly between drainages, and among age classes. For example, adults focus on worms and burrowing mayflies, while the smaller juveniles depend on midge larvae.

Due to specific habitat preferences, ashy darters have found it difficult to maintain existing populations, considering the aforementioned sources of nonpoint pollution and river impoundments. Regrettably, shallow pools of sand and gravel substrate are increasingly scarce, causing remaining populations to be isolated and scattered.

== Life history ==
A. cinereum generally spawns from late January to April, with peak breeding periods occurring in April. Ova produced annually by females are estimated to range from 50–250. Sexual maturity in individuals upon reaching lengths of 50 mm (2.0 in) or more, occurs in the first full spawning season for this species. Females are reported to deposit eggs on water willow stems and on the edges of boulders. Mature adults can reach sizes of up to 100 mm (3.9 in), and enjoy relatively long lifespans of up to four years.

== Management ==
Currently, A. cinereum is listed as threatened in Tennessee, a species of special concern in Kentucky and Virginia, and endangered by the American Fisheries Society. It is regarded as extirpated from Georgia and Alabama. It is also listed as a species of management concern in the Fish and Wildlife Service's Southeast Region. Populations currently protected by the National Park Service include those in the Big South Fork of the Cumberland River and populations in the Emory and Obed River systems.

Notable organizations defending ashy darter populations include Conservation Fisheries of Knoxville, TN. Biologists from Conservation Fisheries have collected individuals for propagation in the Clinch River since 2007. Since very little is known about the life history and reproductive dynamics of this species, breeding efforts in captivity have had minimal success. Little funding is available for these efforts at present. Meanwhile, ideal reintroduction sites could be determined for future attempts in reestablishing propagated individuals of this imperiled species.

Powers (2002) recommended the immediate reduction of silt loads occurring from agricultural and urban runoff, sewage waste, and other sources of pollution. In the Elk River, fluctuating water levels below Tims Ford Dam have been reported to disrupt lifecycles and habitats of remaining populations. Accordingly, minimum flow levels should be maintained in this area. Such impoundments wholly prevent migrations and potential repopulations from adjoining waters.

Management practices occurring presently and in the near future will likely determine the ultimate success of A. cinereum. As noted by numerous studies, these darters are highly jeopardized and require immediate action for hope of re-establishment. In regards to sampling techniques, Etnier and Starnes (1993) noted success in collecting specimens using small seine nets in large pool areas in the Little River. Their methods involved placing seine nets parallel to shore at roughly 1.5 m (5 ft) depth, then moving toward the shore in efforts to obtain individuals from underwater boulders and other forms of cover. Powers et al. (2004) suggested most populations were at risk of extirpation from a single, catastrophic event. Suitably, various studies have indicated the urgent need to continue the monitoring process of remaining populations. Additional surveys and monitoring are suggested specifically for several Tennessee waterways, including the Emory River, Upper Duck River, Roaring River, and Obey River.

The accumulated changes due to habitat loss have ultimately resulted in disjointed populations among drainages, as well as the disappearance of A. cinereum from historical ranges. Powers et al. (2004) examined genetic differentiation between remaining populations in the Cumberland, Duck, and Tennessee River systems. Ensuing results demonstrated genetic divergence, suggesting these three drainages should be treated as distinct management units (MUs). In regards to propagation and reintroduction efforts, offspring should originate from within the major MUs. Powers et al. (2004) suggested it is important to avoid native gene pools becoming mixed or replaced by translocated genotypes. Thus, propagated offspring should be reintroduced into historical ranges of corresponding drainages, but avoid current populations.

In a subsequent study, Powers et al. (2012) further examined the genetic divergence of A. cinereum. The species had diverged most notably in the Cumberland River system, resulting in a new species, A. maydeni, or the redlips darter. A. maydeni is physically distinguished from A. cinereum by having an obvious red pigment on the external surface of the lips. The study also pointed out differences in number of dorsal rays, dorsal spines, and caudal peduncle scales between the proposed new species and A. cinereum. Observations indicated slower growth rates for A. maydeni, as well as increased dependence on burrowing insects (mayflies). In light of the extensive surveys and genetic analyses conducted on the A. cinereum species complex, its taxonomic status remains unclear.
