= Caribbean pipefish =

Conservation status
- Least Concern (IUCN 3.1)

Scientific classification
- Kingdom: Animalia
- Phylum: Chordata
- Class: Actinopterygii
- Order: Syngnathiformes
- Family: Syngnathidae
- Genus: Syngnathus
- Species: S. caribbaeus

Binomial name
- Syngnathus caribbaeus C. E. Dawson, 1979

Species of fish

Caribbean pipefish (Syngnathus caribbaeus) is a species of pipefish. It is widespread in the Western Atlantic near the coasts of South America from Belize to Suriname, as well as from the Greater and Lesser Antilles. It is a reef-associated fish can grow to 22.5 cm (8.9 in) total length.
