= Syngnathus safina =

Conservation status
- Data Deficient (IUCN 3.1)

Scientific classification
- Kingdom: Animalia
- Phylum: Chordata
- Class: Actinopterygii
- Order: Syngnathiformes
- Family: Syngnathidae
- Genus: Syngnathus
- Species: S. safina

Binomial name
- Syngnathus safina Paulus, 1992

Species of fish

Syngnathus safina is a pipefish species which inhabits the western part of the Indian Ocean, the Gulf of Aqaba. It is a marine oceanic demersal fish.
