= Francis Humphreys Storer =

American chemist (1832–1914)

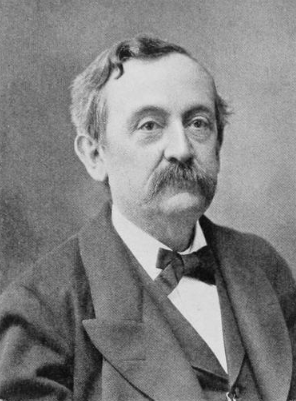
- Born: March 27, 1832; Boston, Massachusetts, US
- Died: July 30, 1914 (aged 82); Boston, Massachusetts, US
- Education: Lawrence Scientific School
- Occupation: Chemist
- Spouse: Catharine A. Eliot (m. 1871)
- Parents: David H. Storer (father); Abby Jane Brewer (mother)
- Relatives: Horatio R. Storer (brother)

Francis Humphreys Storer (March 27, 1832 – July 30, 1914) was an American chemist known for his work in agricultural chemistry.

== Biography ==
Francis Humphreys Storer was born in Boston on March 27, 1832, the son of David H. Storer and Abby Jane Brewer.

He studied under Josiah Parsons Cooke at the Lawrence Scientific School (now known as the Harvard School of Engineering and Applied Sciences). He later was professor of general and industrial chemistry at the Massachusetts Institute of Technology from 1865 to 1870, and dean of the Bussey Institution at Harvard University from 1870 to 1907. At MIT he co-authored with Charles W. Eliot the first Laboratory Manual of Inorganic Chemistry written in the English language.

Storer's father was David H. Storer, a prominent physician and naturalist, and his older brother was Horatio R. Storer, a gynecologist and anti-abortion activist. He was good friends Robert H. Richards, a mining engineer, and Charles Eliot, who would become president of Harvard University, and married his sister Catherine A. Eliot in 1871.

Storer died at his home in Boston on July 30, 1914.
