= Barred pipefish =

Conservation status
- Least Concern (IUCN 3.1)

Scientific classification
- Domain: Eukaryota
- Kingdom: Animalia
- Phylum: Chordata
- Class: Actinopterygii
- Order: Syngnathiformes
- Family: Syngnathidae
- Genus: Syngnathus
- Species: S. auliscus

Binomial name
- Syngnathus auliscus (Swain, 1882)

Synonyms
- Siphostoma auliscus Swain, 1882; Siphostoma sinaloae D. S. Jordan & Starks, 1896; Syngnathus tweedlei Meek & Hildebrand, 1923

Species of fish

The barred pipefish (Syngnathus auliscus) is a species of the pipefishes, widespread in the eastern pacific from the Southern California, United States, to northern Peru. Marine / brackishwater subtropical demersal fish, up to 18.0 cm length.
