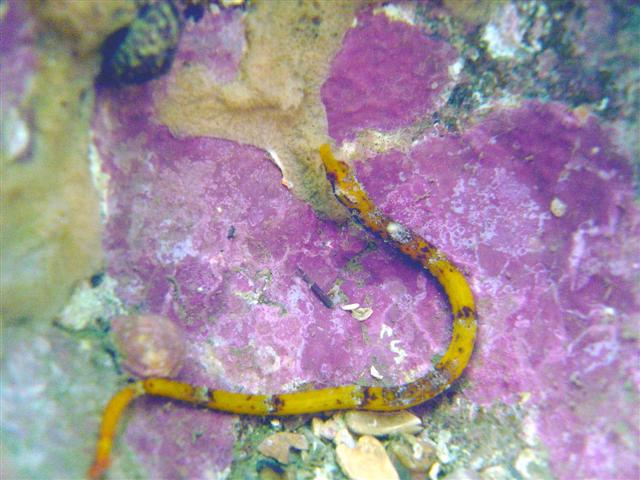

Conservation status
- Least Concern (IUCN 3.1)

Scientific classification
- Kingdom: Animalia
- Phylum: Chordata
- Class: Actinopterygii
- Order: Syngnathiformes
- Family: Syngnathidae
- Genus: Syngnathus
- Species: S. folletti

Binomial name
- Syngnathus folletti Herald, 1942

= Southern pipefish =

Species of fish

The southern pipefish (Syngnathus folletti) is a pipefish species that inhabits the Southwest Atlantic near Uruguay. It is a marine subtropical demersal fish. This species has been recorded among beds of Ruppia maritima in the Lagoa dos Patos in southern Brazil, and apparently they spend the whole of their lives in sea grass beds. It is a carnivorous species which feeds mainly on copepods and isopods, although the females consume a wider variety of prey. It is an ovoviviparous fish, in which the males bear the fertilised eggs inside a brood pouch located beneath its tail. During the breeding season they are sexually dimorphic which indicates that the species is probably polygamous.
