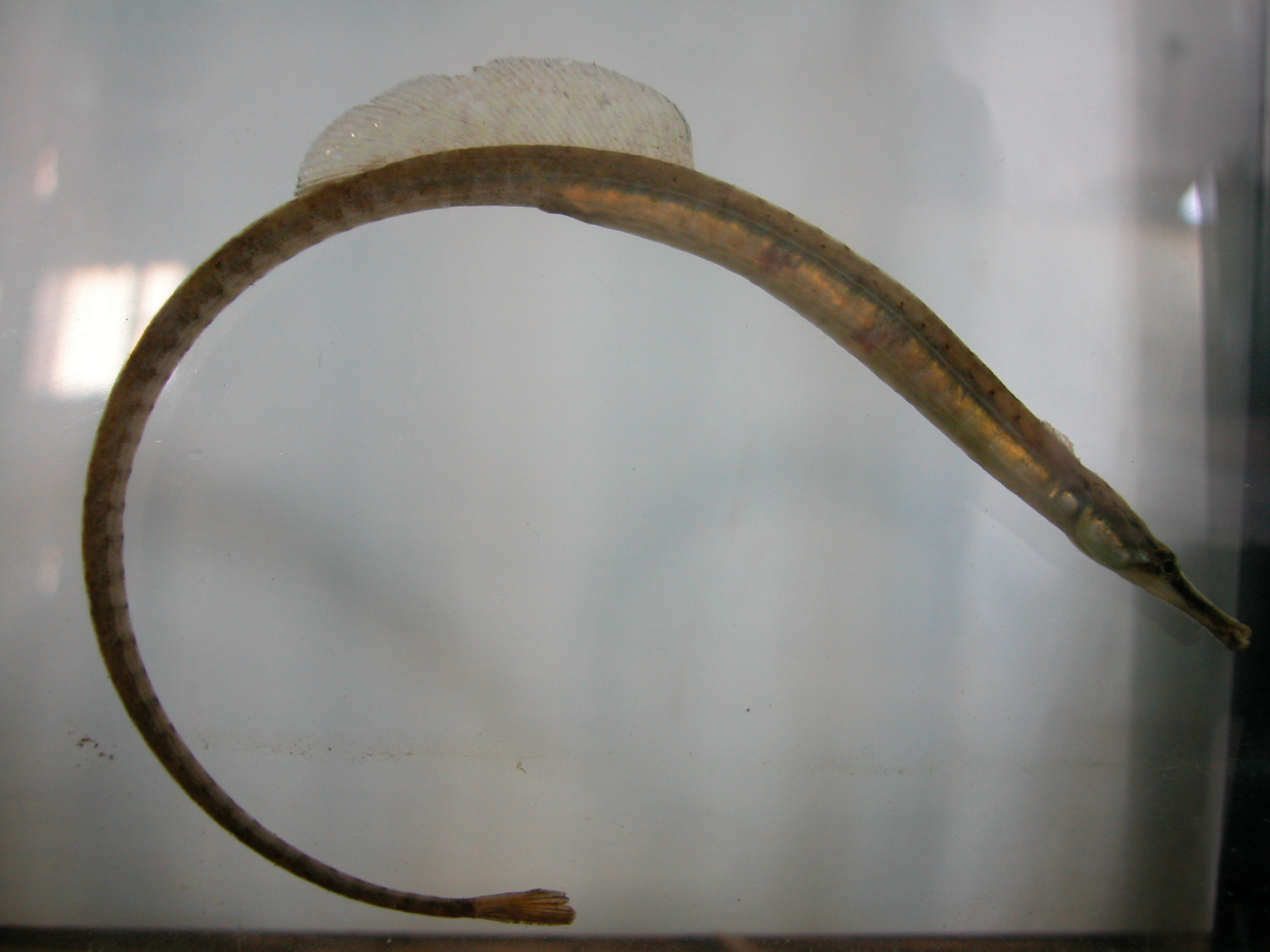

Conservation status
- Least Concern (IUCN 3.1)

Scientific classification
- Kingdom: Animalia
- Phylum: Chordata
- Class: Actinopterygii
- Order: Syngnathiformes
- Family: Syngnathidae
- Genus: Syngnathus
- Species: S. fuscus

Binomial name
- Syngnathus fuscus D. H. Storer (fr), 1839

= Northern pipefish =

Species of fish

The northern pipefish (Syngnathus fuscus) is a northwest Atlantic species of fish belonging to the family Syngnathidae.

== Description ==
The northern pipefish has a long, thin, rigid body encased in bony rings. up to 30.0 cm length. The northern pipefish has a long, thin head, which is rounded at the end of the mouth. The dorsal fin spreads across 4 to 5 of the bony rings that span the body of the northern pipefish. The species has a brood pouch, made up of two lateral flaps that meet along the central line of the fish. The caudal fin is rounded, the anal fin is small, and it lacks ventral and pelvic fins. The species is generally olive or brownish on top. It is typically 10 to 20 cm long, but can sometimes be seen up to 30 cm.

The Northern Pipefish is often regarded as an invader in freshwater ecosystems. Northern pipefish feed on many different organisms with freshwater ecosystems, however, studies have found zooplankton to be the primary organism in pipefish diets. There is evidence of seasonal migration.

== Distribution and habitat ==
Occurs in the north-western Atlantic from the Gulf of Saint Lawrence in Canada to north-eastern Florida in USA and north-western Gulf of Mexico. Found on the depth <2–366 m. Commonly occurs in bays, tide pools, and anywhere sheltered from breaking surf.
