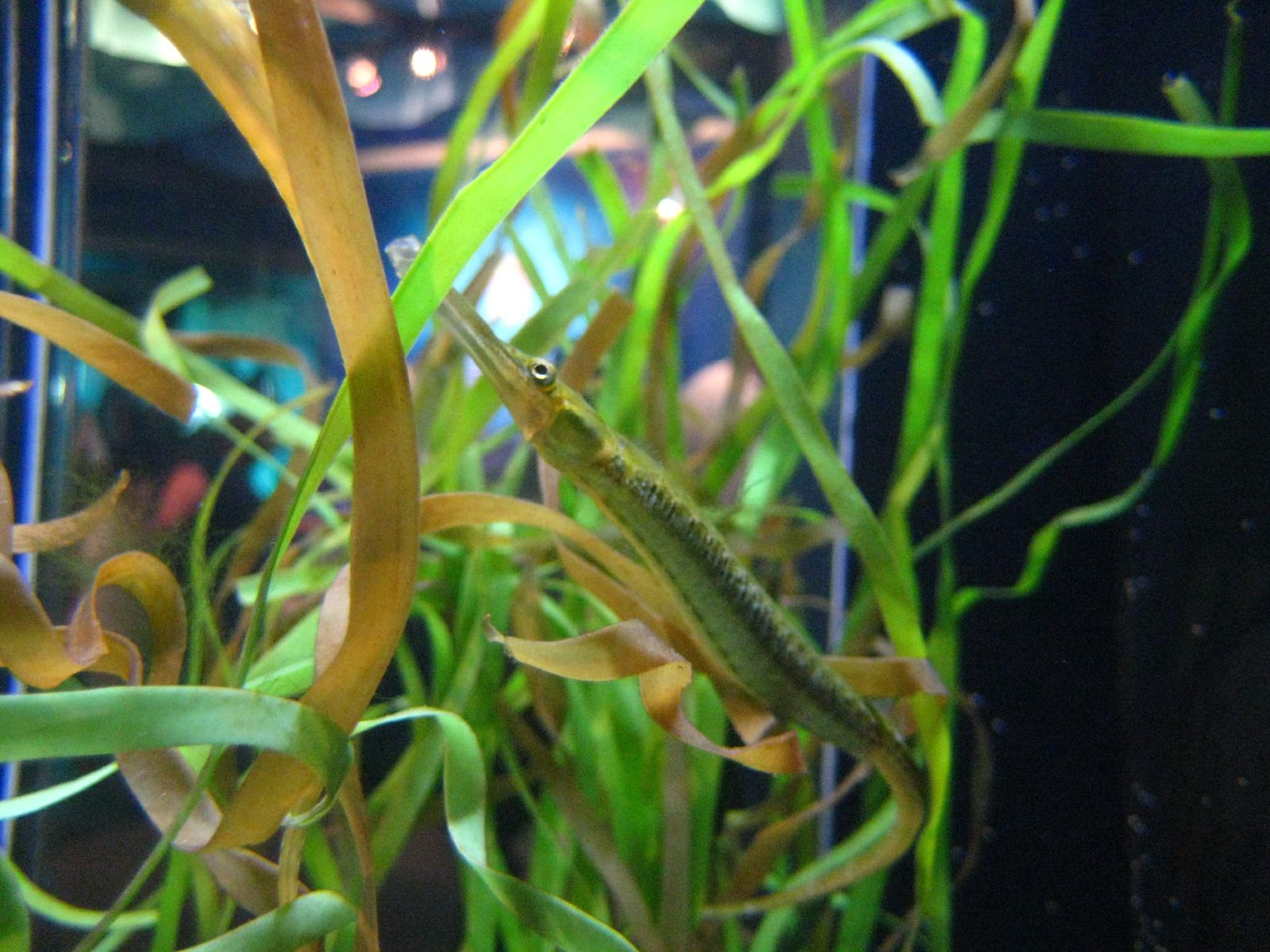
- Bay pipefish in seaweeds

Conservation status
- Least Concern (IUCN 3.1)

Scientific classification
- Kingdom: Animalia
- Phylum: Chordata
- Class: Actinopterygii
- Order: Syngnathiformes
- Family: Syngnathidae
- Genus: Syngnathus
- Species: S. leptorhynchus

Binomial name
- Syngnathus leptorhynchus Girard, 1854

Synonyms
- Siphostoma griseolineatum (Ayres, 1854); Syngnathus griseolineatus Ayres, 1854

= Bay pipefish =

Species of fish

Description

The bay pipefish (Syngnathus leptorhynchus) is a pipefish native to the eelgrass beds of the Eastern Pacific (Southern Baja California to Gulf of Alaska), where its sinuous shape and green color allow it to blend in with the waving blades of eelgrass. They have an elongated, slim body along with weak dorsal fins and pectoral fins for locomotion. This aspect of their morphology sets them up to be poor swimmers. More specifically, they have to resort to steering using their heads to orient their direction. These pipefish also have bony plates that span the length of their ten inch, thin frame. These bony plates help them stay protected from predation and support their body structurally. Bay pipefish also have a toothless, elongated mouth that allow them to suction food into their mouth. Most of their time is spent feeding on algae during the day due to the fact they lack a stomach. Like other members of the seahorse family, male pipefish tend the eggs laid by their female partners in specialized pouches.

Biology

These pipefish display a curious approach at reproduction. Usually, these fish join together in pairs during the morning to reproduce. It is the female pipefish that spend their time courting the male by demonstrations of their colorful appearance, brought out by breeding season. Males grow offspring within pouches at the front of their underbelly. Within this brooding pouch, the females will lay around two hundred eggs over two hours. Once the eggs are enclosed in the male’s pouch, the eggs will develop for about one or two weeks. The male during this period appears pregnant and nourishes the embryos through his bloodstream and an extremity connected to his abdominal wall.

Typically, male pipefish are known to have a breeding period of at least six months and are not found to be monogamous. Females have been discovered to mate with several males as they have an unlimited amount of eggs.

Offspring were seen to mature into adults in a span of less than a year. By the end of that year, individual pipefish were seen to begin reproduction.

Distribution

Bay pipefish typically dwell within coastal marine environments that are specific for seagrass. Eelgrass, a type of seagrass, is most commonly distributed from British Columbia to Pacific and Atlantic waters. Therefore, bay pipefish can be found along the coast ranging from the oceans intertidal zone to depths of 10–20 meters.

Feeding Pattern and Diet

Pipefish are seen to mostly eat small crustaceans such as isopods, copepods and amphipods. Due to their small mouths, pipefish cannot consume larger amphipods.

Pipefish diet is also often dependent on the amount of other organisms during different seasons. This phenomenon is called “seasonal abundance”. Bay pipefish are part of a specialist diet, they are capable of eating larger fleshy individuals, and can feed on algae. When they do have the opportunity to consume these larger individuals, they use the suctioning of their mouth to eat the fleshy skin of larger crustaceans. Figure 2. Pregnant male pipefish, top image

Predation Style

Pipefish can be relatively idle hunters. Bay pipefish typically like to be stationary and hide in seagrass and then lie in wait to corner their prey. Other pipefish typically like to slowly approach their prey, stalk, and snatch them. In either instance, pipefish demonstrate an important shared characteristic when it comes to hunting behaviors in that they require stealth and slow movement when catching prey.

Because of their small, inefficient pectoral fins and dorsal fins they are sedentary predators. They like to wrap themselves around the stems of seagrass and mimic the leaves swaying with the current. Pipefish use their reduced caudal fin to keep themselves vertically upright against the seagrass. Once they detect their prey, they begin to slowly detach themselves from the grass and stealthily approach it. As they reach the appropriate distance to attack, pipefish move into the free water range to reach their prey. It is also suspected that their feeding habitat is restricted to daylight times.

Figure 3. Bay pipefish & seagrass

Migration and Location

Pipefish migrate during different seasons. They are seen to move into shallow vegetative areas during the spring months. It is not until late fall when these creatures venture back to their preferred deeper channel areas. There are some outliers however, that sometimes stay in grass beds during the winter months; this is a small number however.

It is due to different pipefish physiology that their positioning around their vegetative habitat could be varied. For example, pipefish with reduced caudal fins and “ prehensile tail” are more sedentary, commonly found staying around eelgrass and macrophyte canopies. In other pipefish, with more vegetation around their habitat and more advanced caudal fin, they experience more mobility.

Conservation status:

This species has a conservation status of least concern. And can be found in eelgrass beds, coastal wetlands, and open waters. They can be found in shallow waters. These waters consist of Pacific coast waters from high points of North America to Baja California. However, seagrass environments have been experiencing a decline worldwide due to human activities such as habitat fragmentation and natural causes. Though bay pipefish populations are not endangered, the continued decline of seagrass could negatively impact pipefish populations.
