= Barcheek pipefish =

Conservation status
- Least Concern (IUCN 3.1)

Scientific classification
- Kingdom: Animalia
- Phylum: Chordata
- Class: Actinopterygii
- Order: Syngnathiformes
- Family: Syngnathidae
- Genus: Syngnathus
- Species: S. exilis

Binomial name
- Syngnathus exilis (R. C. Osburn & Nichols, 1916)

Synonyms
- Siphostoma exile R. C. Osburn & Nichols, 1916

Species of fish

Barcheek pipefish, Syngnathus exilis, is a species of the pipefishes. Widespread in the Eastern Pacific from the Half Moon Bay in central California, United States, to south central Baja California and Guadalupe Island, Mexico. Marine subtropical demersal fish, up to 25 cm length.
