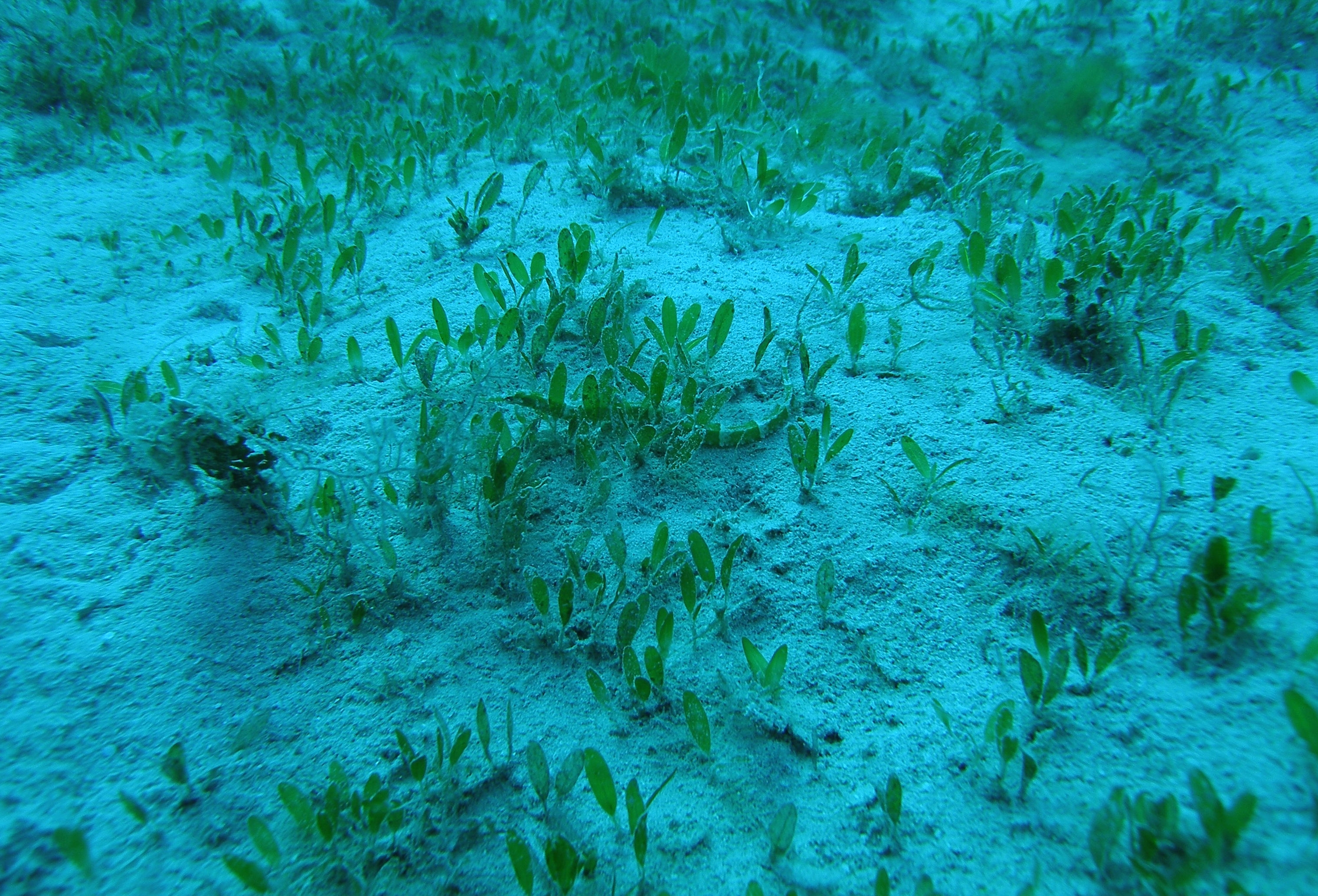

Conservation status
- Data Deficient (IUCN 3.1)

Scientific classification
- Kingdom: Animalia
- Phylum: Chordata
- Class: Actinopterygii
- Order: Syngnathiformes
- Family: Syngnathidae
- Genus: Syngnathus
- Species: S. dawsoni

Binomial name
- Syngnathus dawsoni (Herald, 1969)

Synonyms
- Micrognathus dawsoni Herald, 1969

= Syngnathus dawsoni =

Species of fish

Syngnathus dawsoni is a species of the pipefishes. It occurs in the central, western Atlantic in the Caribbean Sea from Puerto Rico to St. Lucia and has been recorded only from the east of the Mona Passage. It is a marine tropical demersal fish. It is ovoviviparous; the male carries the fertilized eggs in a brood pouch located under his tail. It has been captured at around 7 metres (23 ft) in shallow, inshore water but its habits and ecology are unknown.

== Etymology ==
The specific name honours Charles Eric Dawson who collected the type material and who recognised this species as different from the other Atlantic members of the family Syngnathidae.
