= Bull pipefish =

Conservation status
- Least Concern (IUCN 3.1)

Scientific classification
- Kingdom: Animalia
- Phylum: Chordata
- Class: Actinopterygii
- Order: Syngnathiformes
- Family: Syngnathidae
- Genus: Syngnathus
- Species: S. springeri

Binomial name
- Syngnathus springeri Herald, 1942

Species of fish

The bull pipefish (Syngnathus springeri) is a pipefish species of the western Atlantic, from southern Canada to Panama. It is a marine subtropical reef-associated fish, up to 38 centimetres (15 in) length.
