= Syngnathus macrophthalmus =

Conservation status
- Data Deficient (IUCN 3.1)

Scientific classification
- Kingdom: Animalia
- Phylum: Chordata
- Class: Actinopterygii
- Order: Syngnathiformes
- Family: Syngnathidae
- Genus: Syngnathus
- Species: S. macrophthalmus

Binomial name
- Syngnathus macrophthalmus Duncker, 1915

Species of fish

Syngnathus macrophthalmus is a pipefish species, found only around Suez and Hurghada (Al Ghardaqah) in the northwestern Red Sea. It is a marine tropical demersal fish, up to 12.2 centimetres (4.8 in) total length.
