= Styposis lutea =

Scientific classification
- Domain: Eukaryota
- Kingdom: Animalia
- Phylum: Arthropoda
- Subphylum: Chelicerata
- Class: Arachnida
- Order: Araneae
- Infraorder: Araneomorphae
- Family: Theridiidae
- Genus: Styposis
- Species: S. lutea

Binomial name
- Styposis lutea (Petrunkevitch, 1930)

Species of spider

Styposis lutea is a species of comb-footed spider in the family Theridiidae. It is found in Puerto Rico.
