= Yucatan pipefish =

Yucatán pipefish

Conservation status
- Data Deficient (IUCN 3.1)

Scientific classification
- Kingdom: Animalia
- Phylum: Chordata
- Class: Actinopterygii
- Division: Teleostei
- Order: Syngnathiformes
- Family: Syngnathidae
- Genus: Syngnathus
- Species: S. makaxi

Binomial name
- Syngnathus makaxi Herald & C. E. Dawson, 1972

Synonyms
- Syngnathus scovelli makaxi Herald & C. E. Dawson, 1972

Species of fish

The Yucatán pipefish (Syngnathus makaxi) is a demersal fish species native to the Gulf of Mexico.

== Physical description ==
Syngnathidae fossils can be dated back to the Pliocene period found near Italy. Similarly, such as a tubular moth and long cylindrical bodies can be compared from the fossil records and extant species today. It belongs within the order Gasterosteiformes, meaning boney belly. Their bodies have boney plates used for protection. In the Yucatan pipefish 22-26 dorsal fin rays, pectoral rays 11-12, 3 anal fin rays can be observed (Herald and Dawson 1972). Within the male population, the brood pouch can hold 5-16 eggs. Compared to the gulf pipefish, Syngnathus s. makaxi has less trunk rings and it is significantly smaller in length than the gulf pipefish (Herald and Dawson 1972). Length varies from 52 mm to 154 mm and average weight is about. 3 grams (Wilson, Ahnesjo, Vincent and Meyer 2002).

== Geographic range ==
The Yucatan Pipe fish, Syngnathus makaxi, is indigenous to the Caribbean coast of Mexico near the Isla Majeures in the Laguna Makax (Herald and Dawson 1972). This island is approximately 13 kilometers from the northern coast of the Yucatan peninsula. Syngnathidae specimens, including fossils, are found in most areas of the world with heavy distributions along coast lines and freshwater rivers (Herald and Dawson 1972). Syngnathus makaxi is a subspecies of Syngnathus scovelli also known as the gulf pipefish. The gulf pipefish can be found in waters ranging from Florida to the Gulf of Mexico and Yucatan. The widespread area of geographic range allowed the subspecies S. makaxi over time to isolate and evolve with new defining characteristics.

== Habitat ==
The Yucatan Pipefish can survive in areas of brackish to areas of hypersaline coastal environments (Vega-cendejas, Perlata-meixurero, Hernandez de Santilliana 2017). Syngnathidae are found in shallow water ranging from half a meter to 5 meters. Water temperatures range from 20 degrees Celsius to about 30 degrees Celsius. A pipefishes’ niche is underwater grasses and weeds. The sea grasses in which they live allow the Yucatán pipefish to avoid predation as well as provide necessary food resources.

== Development ==
Assumed to be very similar to the Gulf Pipefish, the development of the Yucatan Pipefish will spawn most of the year in either fresh, brackish, or saline water. S. scovelli is primarily a amphidromous species, meaning that juveniles travel from fresh water to marine water to during development into adulthood(Martin 2013). When mature, the male will selectively choose its mate and will brood its young until they are ready to hatch. Once hatched, the planktonic larvae are released by the male and no further parental investment is observed.

== Reproduction ==
Sex roles in pipefishes are reversed in that the males are responsible for carrying the offspring to term. Due to the sex-role reversal, females often compete with one another for a male mate (Wilson, Ahnesjo, Vincent and Meyer 2002). Sexes are dimorphic, meaning that the females are often larger are more vibrant in color. Females that are larger and tend to be sexually selected more than the smaller females (Wilson, Ahnesjo, Vincent and Meyer 2002). The females within the species have demonstrated polygamous mating patterns, and the males have a longer-term parental investment (Svensson 1998). The cost of brooding in males is a lower risk of survival throughout winter because fat deposition was lowered as a result of parental commitment (Svensson 1998). S. makaxi belongs is a sub species of Syngnathus scovelli, and they are one of the two noted species that can breed in fresh and marine waters (Herald and Dawson 1972). It may be assumed that in males’ paternal investment per offspring is greater than the female’s investment in producing eggs than the males may limit the reproductive success for females within a population (Svensson 1998).

== Life Span/Longevity ==
Because the Yucatan Pipefish is a subspecies of the gulf pipefish, the longevity of the Yucatan pipefish is approximately 5–10 years (Harland and Dawson 1972).

== Behavior ==
Despite their size, pipefish can be very active in their environment. They often drift among the current or attach themselves to grasses or weeded areas in their habitat. Due to the shape of their bodies, they often are camouflaged well within their habitat (Ryer 1988). Avoidance behaviors can be observed by how the Yucatan pipefish blends in with its background to avoid predators (Kleiber, Blight, Caldwell 2011). Spawning can occur throughout the year but is mainly during the warmer months of the year (Svensson 1988).

== Food habits ==
S. Makaxi, along with other members of the pipefish family are commonly identified by an elongated snout that is used to with suction to devour small prey. Due to the size and confirmation of their mouths, members of the genus are limited by the size of their prey (Ryer and Orth 1987). S. Makaxi is considered carnivorous and consumes amphipods and copepods (Huh, Knitting 1985). Many pipefishes utilize their habitat and while camouflaged in tall sea grasses, use a “sit and wait” technique when hunting for food (Tipton and Bell 1988).

== Predation ==
All syngnathids try avoid predation by blending into their habitat through means of “disguise” and “masquerade”.(Kleiber, Blight, Caldwell 2011). Physical characteristics allows syngnathids to avoid predation very well, however studies suggests that syngnathids are most vulnerable to predation when the habitat changes and no longer supports the phenotype of pipe horses and mating behavior increases risk of predation (Kleiber, Blight, Caldwell 201).According to Kleiber, Blight and Caldwell, they “identified 135 reports of predation on syngnathids by at least 82 predator species from a range of taxa,” including, “invertebrates….fishes….turtles…and marine mammals”.

== Ecosystem roles ==
Pipefish are foragers that consume small animals like plankton, small shrimp, and some crustaceans. Although it is thought that most pipefish have few predators due to their avoidance behavior, they are resource for the predators that do consume them (Kleiber, Blight, Caldwell 2011).

== Economic importance ==
Humans have had a negative impact on the economic status Syngnathus s. makaxi because dredging and construction has had devastating effects on their unique environment (Herald and Dawson 1972). Removal of pipefishes may disrupt ecosystems. One positive economic importance that Syngnathus s. makaxi provides a specimen to study reverse sex roles and reproductive ecology in a scientific field.

== Conservation status ==
According to the IUCN Red List, the Yucatan Pipefish is listed as threatened as of 2014. Habitat loss contributes greatly to the overall population to the species. According to Herald and Dawson, “dredging and considerable construction have now destroyed much of this locally unique habitat.” Being that the Yucatan Pipefish relies heavily on its habitat to avoid predation and for food resources, habitat loss contributes greatly to the reduction in population. Protecting the habitat would aid in the overall population status of S. makaxi.
