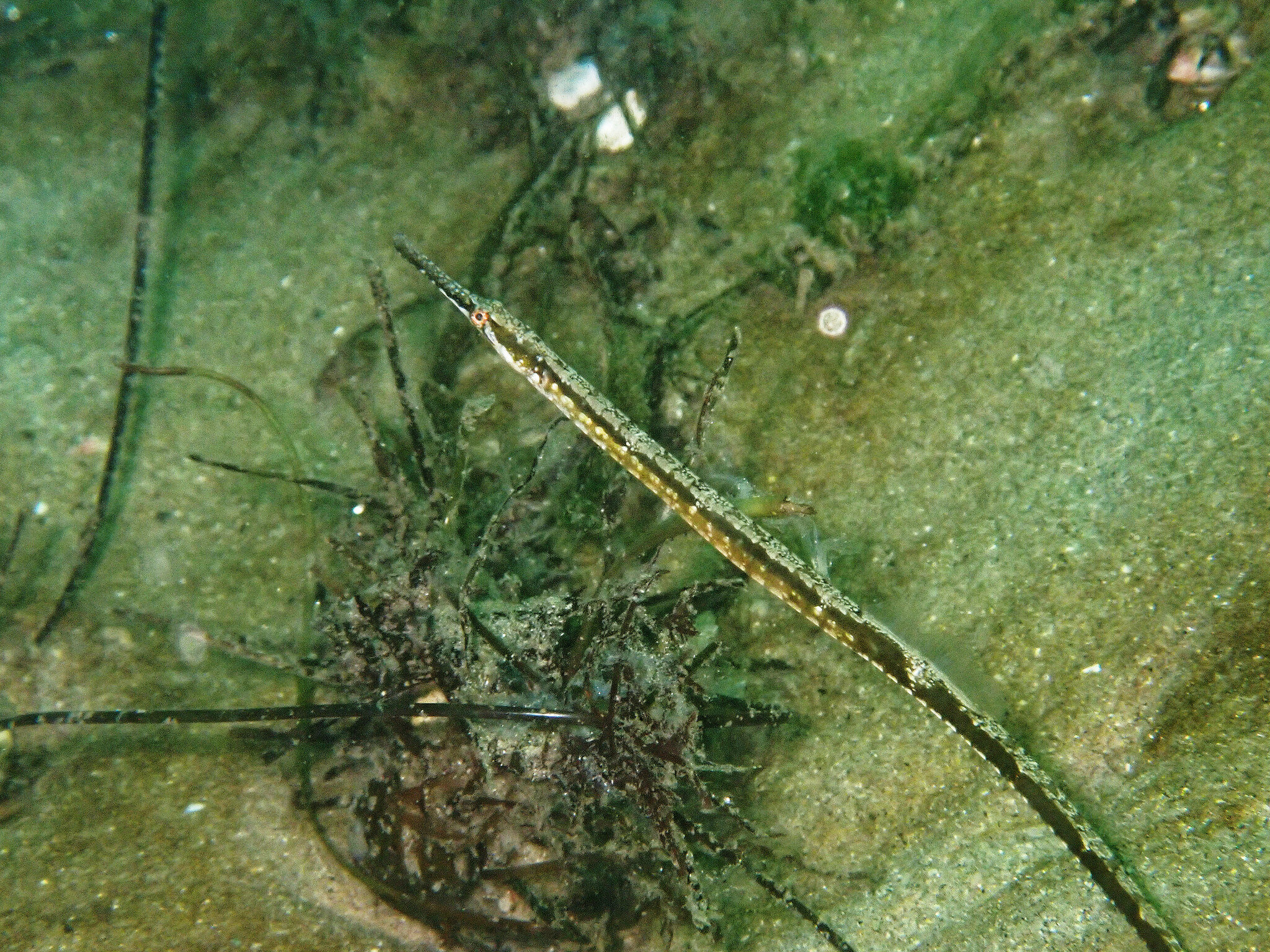

Conservation status
- Least Concern (IUCN 3.1)

Scientific classification
- Kingdom: Animalia
- Phylum: Chordata
- Class: Actinopterygii
- Order: Syngnathiformes
- Family: Syngnathidae
- Genus: Syngnathus
- Species: S. californiensis

Binomial name
- Syngnathus californiensis D. H. Storer, 1845

= Kelp pipefish =

Species of fish

The kelp pipefish (Syngnathus californiensis) is a species of pipefish. It inhabits the eastern Pacific from the Bodega Bay in northern California, United States, to southern Baja California, Mexico. It is a marine subtropical demersal fish, up to 50 centimetres (20 in) length.
