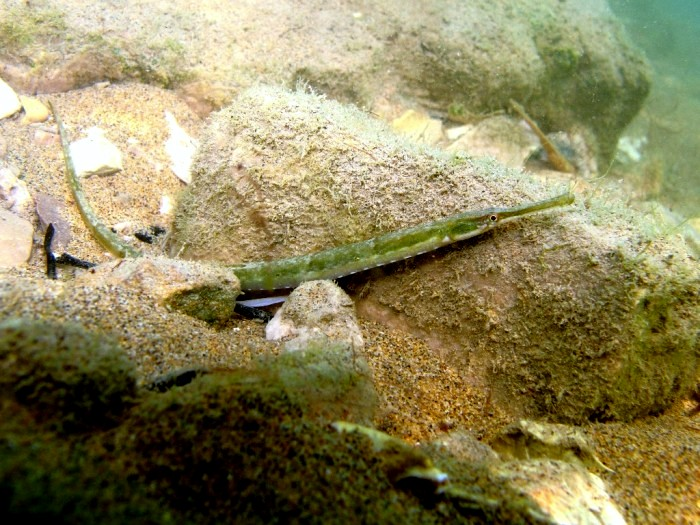

Conservation status
- Data Deficient (IUCN 3.1)

Scientific classification
- Domain: Eukaryota
- Kingdom: Animalia
- Phylum: Chordata
- Class: Actinopterygii
- Order: Syngnathiformes
- Family: Syngnathidae
- Genus: Syngnathus
- Species: S. taenionotus

Binomial name
- Syngnathus taenionotus Canestrini, 1871

= Darkflank pipefish =

Species of fish

Darkflank pipefish (Syngnathus taenionotus) is a pipefish species that inhabits the north-western Adriatic. It is found both in marine and brackish habitats. It is a demersal fish in which the males are ovoviviparous. It grows up to 19 centimetres (7.5 in) in length. It is found mostly among detritus or vegetation on the shallow muddy bottom.
