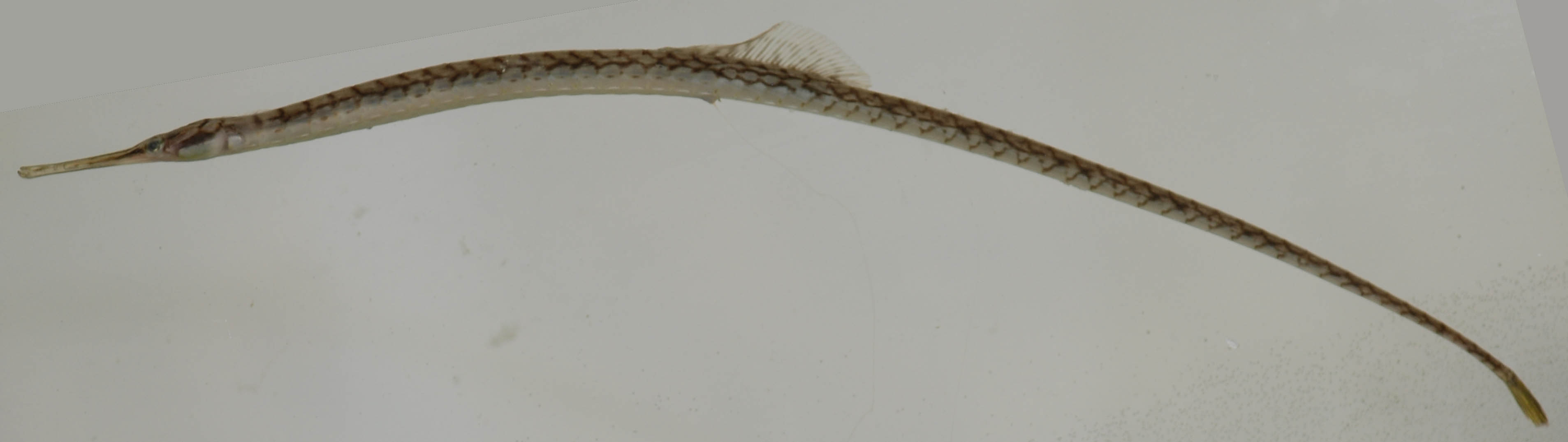

Conservation status
- Data Deficient (IUCN 3.1)

Scientific classification
- Domain: Eukaryota
- Kingdom: Animalia
- Phylum: Chordata
- Class: Actinopterygii
- Order: Syngnathiformes
- Family: Syngnathidae
- Genus: Syngnathus
- Species: S. louisianae

Binomial name
- Syngnathus louisianae Günther, 1870

= Chain pipefish =

Species of fish

The chain pipefish (Syngnathus louisianae) is a pipefish species. It inhabits the western Atlantic from Virginia, Bermuda and northern Gulf of Mexico to Campeche and Jamaica, but is absent from the Bahamas. It is a marine subtropical reef-associated fish, up to 38 cm length.

== Description ==
The chain pipefish is a member of the family Sygnathidae. It is an elongate fish with the body encased in bony plates. They have a moderate-sized head, a rounded caudal fin, long snout and a small terminal mouth. The dorsal fin is moderate in length, the anal fin is greatly reduced, and the pelvic fins do not exist. The abdomen is flat or concave and may have a very small keel. The inferior trunk and tail ridges are not interrupted. Males have a brood pouch along the tail. There are 33-36 dorsal rays, 2 anal rays, 14 pectoral rays, 20 trunk rings, and 35-36 tail rings. The chain pipefish is one of the largest species of pipefishes in the western North Atlantic, with a maximum length of 381mm (15 in). The coloration of the chain pipefish, generally has a light colored background that is white to light brown. There is a dark brown stripe along the sides that extends onto the snout. There are lighter circular bands around the body between each body ring. The circular bands do not extend onto the ventral surface in the trunk area, but are visible along the tail. The anal, pectoral, and dorsal fins are generally unpigmented, but may have some scattered melanophores. The caudal fin is dusky.

== Diet ==
Chain pipefish feed on small crustaceans, including shrimp, mysids, and amphipods.

== Habitat ==
Chain pipefish are common is sea grass beds or among the stems of marsh grasses and reeds near the shore along the Northern Gulf of Mexico. Juvenile chain pipefish also occur in surface water to at least 80 km offshore.

== Reproduction and life cycle ==
There is apparently no information on larval development, though larvae are initially retained within the male brood pouch. S. louisianae males give birth to live young from eggs transferred from the female to a specialized marsupium called a brood pouch. Unlike most seahorses, pipefishes of the genus Syngnathus incubate eggs in an inverted pouch. Fertilization occurs after the female transfers the eggs, and incubation lasts until embryos develop into juveniles. Based on the occurrence of brooding males and newly hatched larvae, reproduction occurs primarily during the spring and early summer (April – July), but continues through most months in Mississippi, except December and February. Brooding males are more commonly found offshore.

Fertilized eggs are small, ranging from 0.6 and 1.4 mm in diameter, and are arranged in one to two layers and up to 10 transverse rows. A single male may brood 454-898 eggs, depending on the body size

== Distribution ==
Chain pipefish are distributed from New Jersey and Maryland south to along the Atlantic and the Gulf Shores. They are also found in Tabasco and Campeche, Mexico.
