= Syngnathus affinis =

Scientific classification
- Domain: Eukaryota
- Kingdom: Animalia
- Phylum: Chordata
- Class: Actinopterygii
- Order: Syngnathiformes
- Family: Syngnathidae
- Genus: Syngnathus
- Species: S. affinis

Binomial name
- Syngnathus affinis Eichwald, 1831

Species of fish

Syngnathus affinis is a species of pipefish. It is found in the Black Sea.
