= Styposis selis =

- Male
- Female

Scientific classification
- Kingdom: Animalia
- Phylum: Arthropoda
- Subphylum: Chelicerata
- Class: Arachnida
- Order: Araneae
- Infraorder: Araneomorphae
- Family: Theridiidae
- Genus: Styposis
- Species: S. selis

Binomial name
- Styposis selis Levi, 1964

Species of spider

Styposis selis is a species of comb-footed spider in the family Theridiidae. It is found in Brazil.
