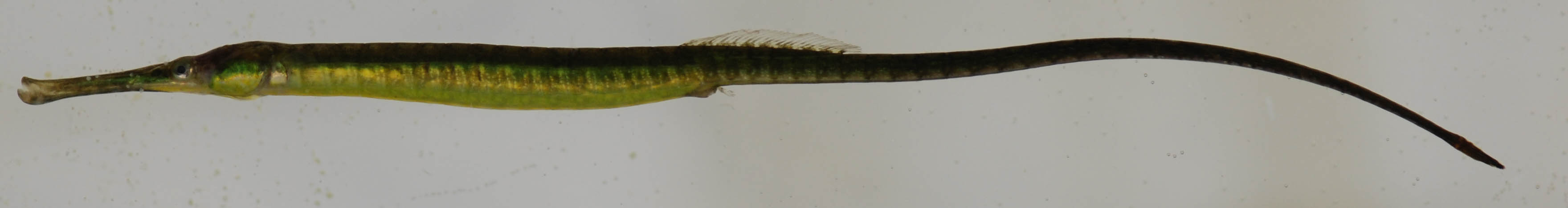

Conservation status
- Least Concern (IUCN 3.1)

Scientific classification
- Kingdom: Animalia
- Phylum: Chordata
- Class: Actinopterygii
- Order: Syngnathiformes
- Family: Syngnathidae
- Genus: Syngnathus
- Species: S. floridae

Binomial name
- Syngnathus floridae (D. S. Jordan & C. H. Gilbert, 1882)

Synonyms
- Siphostoma floridae D. S. Jordan & C. H. Gilbert, 1882

= Dusky pipefish =

Species of fish

The dusky pipefish (Syngnathus floridae) is a species of the pipefishes, widespread in the western Atlantic from the Bermuda, Chesapeake Bay (United States), northern part of the Gulf of Mexico, Bahama, and the western Caribbean Sea to Panama in south. Marine subtropical demersal fish, which lives at the depth up to 22 metres (72 ft), usually up to 4 metres (13 ft). The maximal length of the fish is 25 centimetres (9.8 in).

Like other members of the genus Syngnathus, S. floridae demonstrate sex-role reversal between males and females in mating and caring for their young. The females deposit their eggs into a brood pouch in the male during copulation. The males then fertilize the eggs and provide all post-zygotic care by physically carrying the eggs and transferring nutrients to the developing embryos through a placenta-like connection. The eggs hatch about 10 days later and are subsequently independent of their parental support.

Dusky pipefish are polygynandrous because both males and females mate with multiple partners. However, males are the limiting sex because they can only carry a certain number of eggs in their brood pouch at one time. In contrast, females produce more eggs than they can deposit, so they have unlimited success. Furthermore, sexual selection acts on body size, selecting for larger males. Larger males can carry more eggs and have more female mates, and thus the larger males have a higher reproductive success than the smaller males.

Environmental variations between populations of dusky pipefish influence their reproductive success. Temperature of water plays a major role in reproductive success by influencing sexual selection. As temperature increases, the rate for potential reproduction increases for both males and females, but faster for males. This shows that temperature influences sexual selection by selecting against the slower rate of reproduction in females. Higher temperature influences reproductive success by increasing the number of eggs produced by the female and thus decreasing the number of mates the male needs to fill its brood pouch. In addition, lower temperatures yield a lower reproductive success in males because they do not accept as many eggs in this environment.
