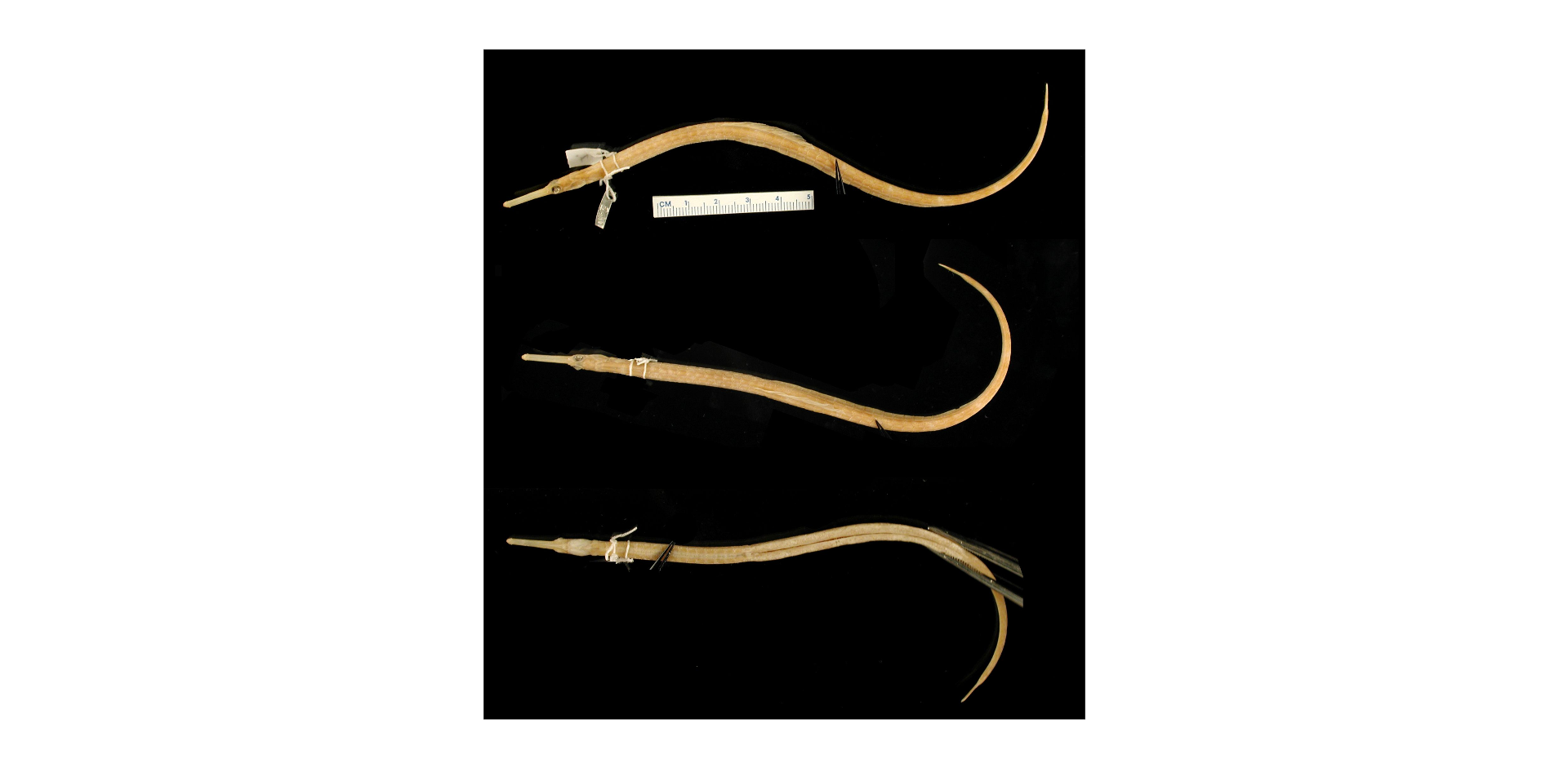

Conservation status
- Data Deficient (IUCN 3.1)

Scientific classification
- Domain: Eukaryota
- Kingdom: Animalia
- Phylum: Chordata
- Class: Actinopterygii
- Order: Syngnathiformes
- Family: Syngnathidae
- Genus: Syngnathus
- Species: S. carinatus

Binomial name
- Syngnathus carinatus (C. H. Gilbert, 1892)

Synonyms
- Siphostoma carinatus C. H. Gilbert, 1892

= Syngnathus carinatus =

Species of fish

Syngnathus carinatus is a species of pipefish endemic of the northern part of the Gulf of California. It is a marine subtropical demersal fish, which grows up to 23 centimetres (9.1 in) in length.
