= Styposis =

Styposis Temporal range: Neogene– Present
- male S. selis
- Eye pattern of S. rancho

Scientific classification
- Kingdom: Animalia
- Phylum: Arthropoda
- Subphylum: Chelicerata
- Class: Arachnida
- Order: Araneae
- Infraorder: Araneomorphae
- Family: Theridiidae
- Genus: Styposis; Simon, 1894

Type species
- S. flavescens Simon, 1894

Species
- 14, see text

Synonyms
- Cyatholipulus Petrunkevitch, 1930

Genus of spiders

Styposis is a genus of comb-footed spiders that was first described by Eugène Louis Simon in 1894. It is a senior synonym of Cyatholipulus.

They are unpigmented, small spiders, usually measuring less than 2 millimetres (0.079 in) long. Comb-footed spiders usually have eight eyes, but most species have six large eyes, with the anterior median eyes extremely small or absent entirely. Members of Comaroma also have six eyes, but also have a large colulus and are less sclerotized.

== Species ==
As of June 2020 it contains fourteen species, found in Central America, South America, the Congo, the United States, and Puerto Rico:

- Styposis ajo Levi, 1960 – USA
- Styposis albula (Gertsch, 1960) – Guyana
- Styposis camoteensis (Levi, 1967) – Chile (Juan Fernandez Is.)
- Styposis chickeringi Levi, 1960 – Panama
- Styposis clausis Levi, 1960 – USA to Colombia
- Styposis colorados Levi, 1964 – Ecuador
- Styposis flavescens Simon, 1894 (type) – Nicaragua to Venezuela
- Styposis kahuziensis Miller, 1970 – Congo
- Styposis lutea (Petrunkevitch, 1930) – Puerto Rico
- Styposis nicaraguensis Levi, 1960 – Nicaragua
- Styposis rancho Levi, 1960 – Venezuela
- Styposis scleropsis Levi, 1960 – Panama
- Styposis selis Levi, 1964 – Brazil
- Styposis tepus (Levi, 1967) – Chile
