= Styposis kahuziensis =

Scientific classification
- Domain: Eukaryota
- Kingdom: Animalia
- Phylum: Arthropoda
- Subphylum: Chelicerata
- Class: Arachnida
- Order: Araneae
- Infraorder: Araneomorphae
- Family: Theridiidae
- Genus: Styposis
- Species: S. kahuziensis

Binomial name
- Styposis kahuziensis Miller, 1970

Species of spider

Styposis kahuziensis is a species of comb-footed spider in the family Theridiidae. It is found in the Congo.
