= Styposis tepus =

Scientific classification
- Kingdom: Animalia
- Phylum: Arthropoda
- Subphylum: Chelicerata
- Class: Arachnida
- Order: Araneae
- Infraorder: Araneomorphae
- Family: Theridiidae
- Genus: Styposis
- Species: S. tepus

Binomial name
- Styposis tepus (Levi, 1967)

Species of spider

Styposis tepus is a species of comb-footed spider in the family Theridiidae. It is found in Chile.
