= Styposis albula =

Scientific classification
- Domain: Eukaryota
- Kingdom: Animalia
- Phylum: Arthropoda
- Subphylum: Chelicerata
- Class: Arachnida
- Order: Araneae
- Infraorder: Araneomorphae
- Family: Theridiidae
- Genus: Styposis
- Species: S. albula

Binomial name
- Styposis albula (Gertsch, 1960)

Species of spider

Styposis albula is a species of comb-footed spider in the family Theridiidae. It is found in Guyana.
