= Storer House =

Storer House may refer to:

in the United States

(by state)

- Storer House (Los Angeles, California), listed on the NRHP in California
- Storer House (Kosciusko, Mississippi), listed on the NRHP in Mississippi
