= David Humphreys Storer =

American physician

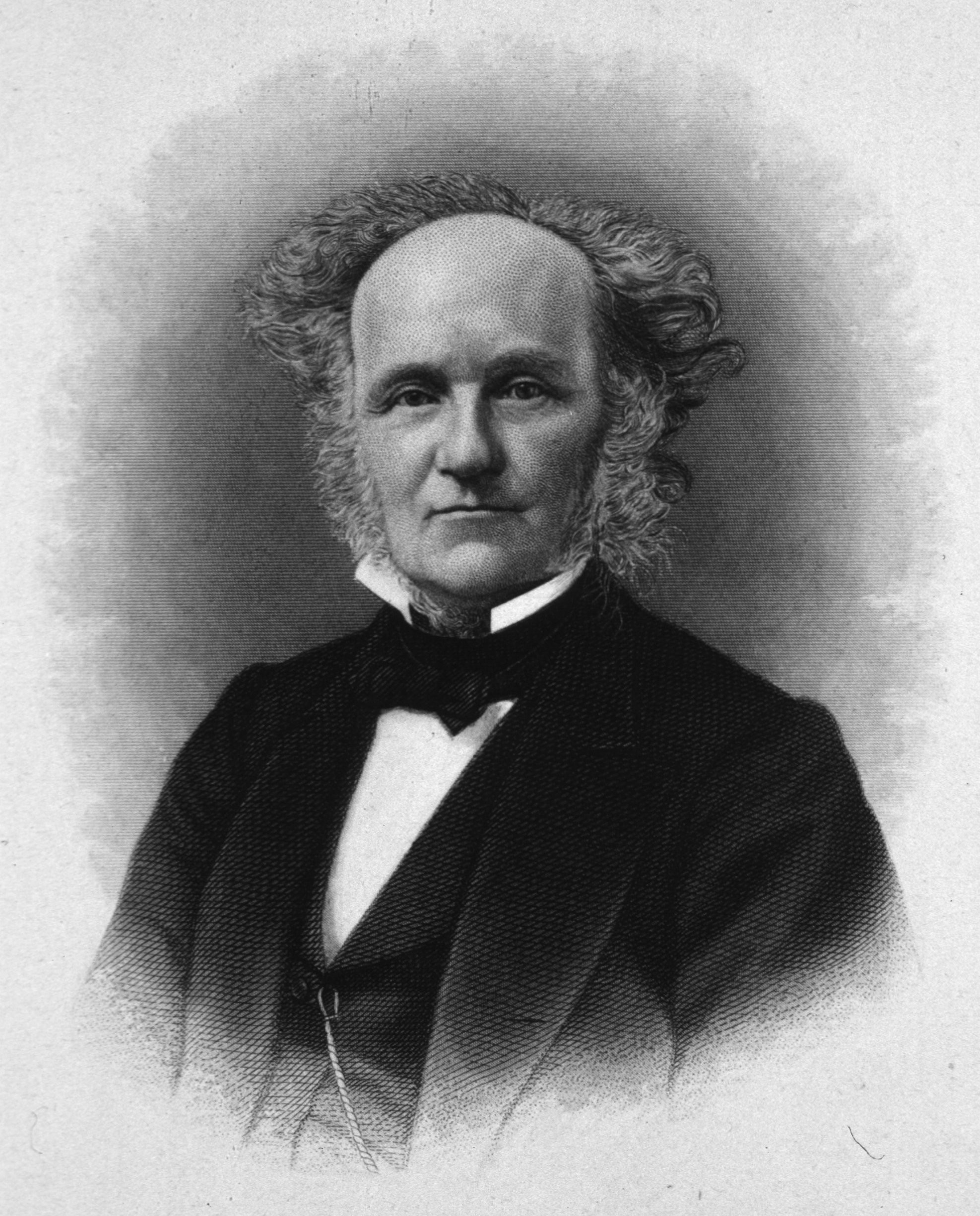
- Born: March 26, 1804; Portland, Maine, U.S.
- Died: September 10, 1891 (aged 87); Boston, Massachusetts, U.S.
- Education: Harvard Medical School, 1825; Bowdoin College, 1822
- Occupation: Physician
- Spouse: Abigail Jane Storer (nee Brewer)
- Children: Horatio Storer; Francis Humphreys Storer; Abby Matilda Storer; Mary Goddard Storer; Robert Woodbury Storer

David Humphreys Storer (March 26, 1804 – September 10, 1891) was an American physician and naturalist. He served as dean of the Faculty of Medicine at Harvard Medical School from 1855 to 1864.

He identified numerous fish species and published on the reptiles and fishes of New England. He was elected as a member of the American Philosophical Society in 1872.

The colubrid snake genus Storeria is named in his honor.

Physician and anti-abortion activist Horatio Storer (1830–1922) and chemist, Massachusetts Institute of Technology professor and dean of the Bussey Institution at Harvard University Francis Humphreys Storer (1832–1914) are his sons.

== Species descriptions ==
Among the fish he described are:

- The tessellated darter (Etheostoma olmstedi)
- The yellowtail flounder (Limanda ferruginea)
- The rainbow darter (Etheostoma caeruleum)
- The northern pipefish (Syngnathus fuscus)
- The kelp pipefish (Syngnathus californiensis)
- The ashy darter (Etheostoma cinereum)
- The northern studfish (Fundulus catenatus)
- The wrymouth (Cryptacanthodes maculatus), sometimes called a ghostfish
- The blackspotted topminnow, (Fundulus olivaceus)

He also described the snake Storeria occipitomaculata, commonly known as the redbelly snake.

- Category:Taxa named by David Humphreys Storer

== Selected publications ==
- Storer, David Humphreys; Peabody, William Bourne Oliver (1839). Reports on the Fishes, Reptiles and Birds of Massachusetts. Boston: Dutton and Wentworth, State Printers.
- Storer DH (1846). "A Synopsis of the Fishes of North America". Memoirs of the American Academy of Arts and Sciences 2: 253–550.
- Storer DH (1853). "A History of the Fishes of Massachusetts". Memoirs of the American Academy of Arts and Sciences 5 (1): 122–168.
- Storer DH (1859). "A History of the Fishes of Massachusetts". Memoirs of the American Academy of Arts and Sciences 6 (2): 309–372.
