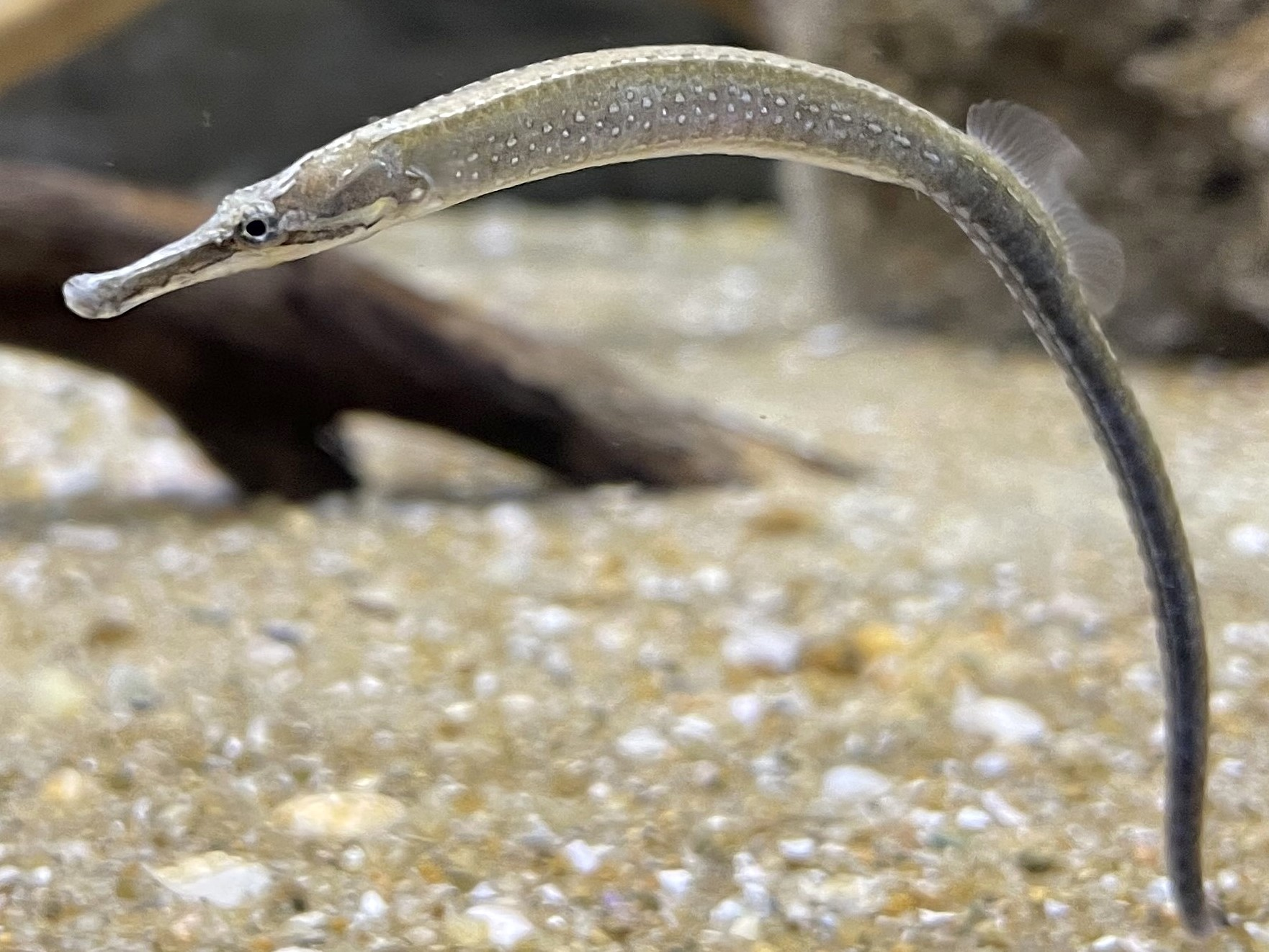

Conservation status
- Least Concern (IUCN 3.1)

Scientific classification
- Kingdom: Animalia
- Phylum: Chordata
- Class: Actinopterygii
- Division: Teleostei
- Order: Syngnathiformes
- Family: Syngnathidae
- Genus: Syngnathus
- Species: S. schlegeli

Binomial name
- Syngnathus schlegeli Kaup, 1856

Synonyms
- Sygnathoides schlegeli (Kaup, 1856); Syngnathus acusimilis Günther, 1873

= Pacific seaweed pipefish =

Species of fish

The Pacific seaweed pipefish (Syngnathus schlegeli) is a species of pipefish, which is a marine, oceanic demersal fish, common in the beds of Zostera sea grass. The pipefish is well known for being one of the most famous and expensive materials of Traditional Chinese medicine, as it possesses a special medicinal composition. The fish is a member of the Syngnathidae family, making them relatives with seahorses and seadragons. The Syngnathidae family is a large group with almost 300 species of marine, brackish, and freshwater fish.

== Distribution ==
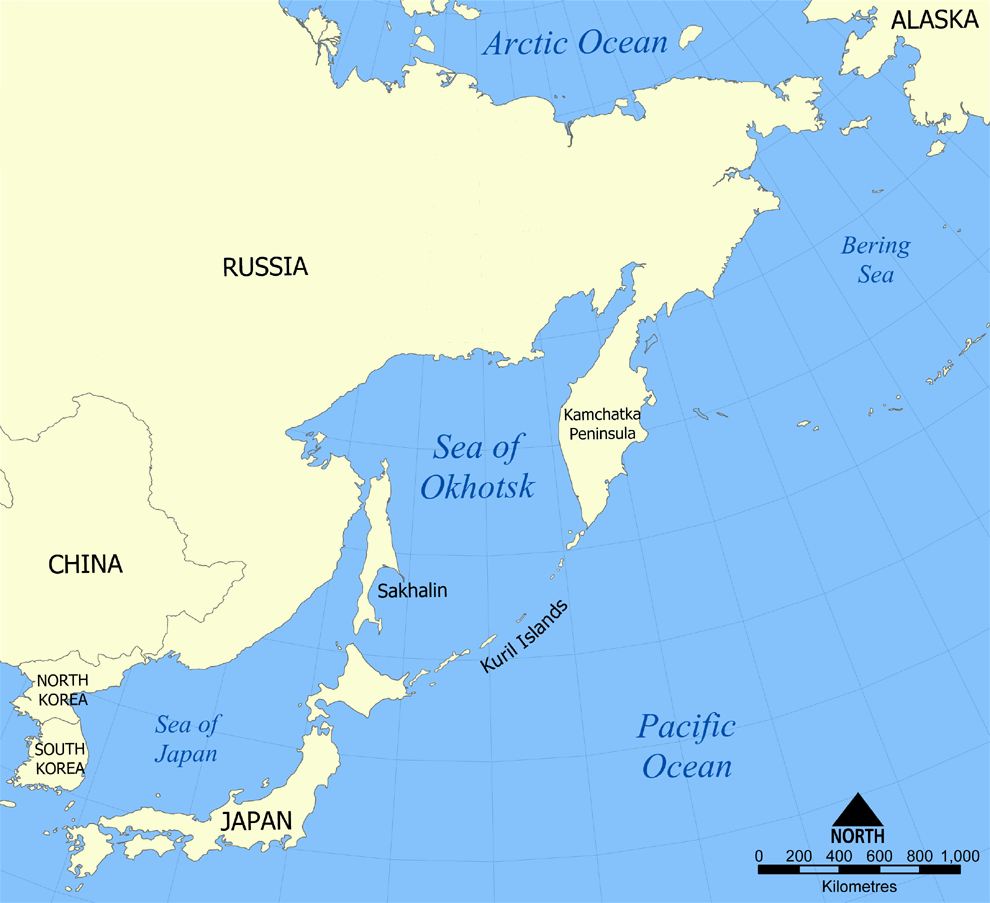
Coastal range of S. schlegeli

Syngnathus schlegeli is a species found in the north-western Pacific Ocean, near Vladivostok (Russia), southern to Gulf of Tonkin. Pacific Seaweed Pipefish is one of the more widespread pipefish species along the coast of Japan and inhabit the shallow seagrass beds. The pipefish occur in these seagrass beds during breeding season, May to October, and stay in deeper offshore waters in winter and early spring for thermal refuge. The pipefish resides in a broad geographic distribution which encompasses a wide variety of climate conditions and microhabitats.

== Description ==
The Seaweed Pipefish has a slender, elongate body structure with a longer, tube-shaped snout and a terminal mouth. Like other Syngnathids, they lack teeth and have jaws towards the end of their snout. The tubular and rigid snouts are made of certain, specialized neurocranial bones. The standard length of juveniles was found to range from 5.5 to 14.7 cm, while the adults length ranged from 13.3 to 27.7 cm. Their bodies are mainly a brownish color with pale markings. Compared to seahorses, most all pipefish species possess snouts which are relatively longer and narrower than those of seahorses. They have very small dorsal and pectoral fins which they beat rapidly to propel themselves, and use their head to steer. The fish lack large caudal fins which gives more power to swimming motions, so they must rely on these oscillations to maneuver and keep control. Pipefish are usually poor swimmers, especially in open water, which is why they are mainly found in shallow water amidst seaweed or seagrass. Their shape and color also allows them to blend into their surrounding vegetation, making predator avoidance and catching prey a little easier.

== Reproduction ==
Pipefish are similar to seahorses by their unique mode of reproduction, the male becomes pregnant. The reproductive season of S. schlegeli begins in May and continues into October, more than six months. This long breeding season is characterized in other Pipefish as well, such as Syngnathus abaster and Syngnathus taenionotus. The males of S. schlegeli have a special secondary sexual organ which develops along with the sexual maturity in males. This is the brood pouch, in which the eggs develop. The brooding period ranges from 14 to 28 days, the offspring develop and are released as free-living juveniles. These juveniles are unique in that syngnathids produce juveniles that have fully developed prey-capture abilities. Females have a higher reproductive rate than males, so consequently females mate with multiple males sequentially to have greater reproductive success, meaning the species is polygamous. Once a pair have mated, there is exclusive paternal care of eggs.

== Feeding ==
When the pipefish hunt, they are among the fastest feeders of all fish, this is referring to the act of them catching their prey, not the steps leading up to it. The fish find their prey through eyesight and can actively swim through the water column in their search. They normally choose their prey based on how easy it is to track them, so they look for colors or small swarms of prey. S. schlegeli must use a slow approach as to not scare away its prey, and because it would not be fast enough to swim after it. The Pipefish species have developed a specific head morphology which limits fluid disturbance as they strike, so it lessens the chances of them being detected. It is able to catch the prey by positioning the body so the snout is only a few millimeters away from the prey, and then snapping its mouth rapidly by rotating the head away from the body. This explosive head rotation allows the fish to keep a constant body position. The longer the snout of these fish, the further away the fish can attack prey. Thus, the snout morphology determines the size of prey they are able to catch. Furthermore, as juveniles pipefish can be considered specialist feeders since they are limited to smaller prey, and adults are more generalist feeders as they have access to a wider range of prey. S. schlegeli are carnivorous fish, eating small crustaceans like copepods and amphipods, fish, fish eggs, and zooplankton.

== Conservation status ==
The most recent assessment of the Pacific Seaweed Pipefish for The IUCN Red List of Threatened Species was in December of 2014 and the species was listed as Least Concern. The Seaweed Pipefish is not as widely studied as other species in its family such as seahorses, but the species is still facing threats from human activities. The marine environments pipefish species depend on include seagrass meadows, coral reefs, mangroves, and more. The species do not thrive in open water habitats due to their morphology. These habitats in which they depend on are constantly at risk to coastal development, pollution, and climate change effects. Pipefish are also susceptible to being bycatch in fisheries which harvest other species. Conservation efforts are being made to support threatened coastal habitats, one of these efforts includes Marine Protected Areas. Through the implementation of MPAs, pipefish can continue to thrive in their natural habitats. More research is certainly needed for the Pacific Seaweed Pipefish, this can help scientists better understand the species role in the ecosystem and the population dynamics of the fish.
