= Redlips darter =

Conservation status
- Imperiled (NatureServe)

Scientific classification
- Kingdom: Animalia
- Phylum: Chordata
- Class: Actinopterygii
- Order: Perciformes
- Family: Percidae
- Genus: Allohistium
- Species: A. maydeni

Binomial name
- Allohistium maydeni (Powers & Kuhajda in Powers, Kuhajda and Ahlbrand, 2012)

Synonyms
- Etheostoma maydeni

Species of fish

The redlips darter (Allohistium maydeni) is a species of freshwater ray-finned fish, a darter from the subfamily Etheostomatinae, part of the family Percidae, which also contains the perches, ruffes and pikeperches. It is endemic to the eastern United States, where it is restricted to large tributaries of the Cumberland River below Cumberland Falls. This species can reach a length of 8 cm (3.1 in). The specific name maydeni honors the American ichthyologist Richard L. Mayden in recognition of his studies of North American fishes. The populations of this species have been fragmented because of the construction of reservoirs. They inhabit slow-moving streams and rivers where they prefer pools near the banks where there are scattered rocks and fallen wood. Their common name refers to the red coloring on their lips. Another distinguishing feature is that they possess a greatly enlarged second dorsal fin and also have angled dusky bars along the flanks.
