= William Bourne Oliver Peabody =

American minister and author (1799–1847)

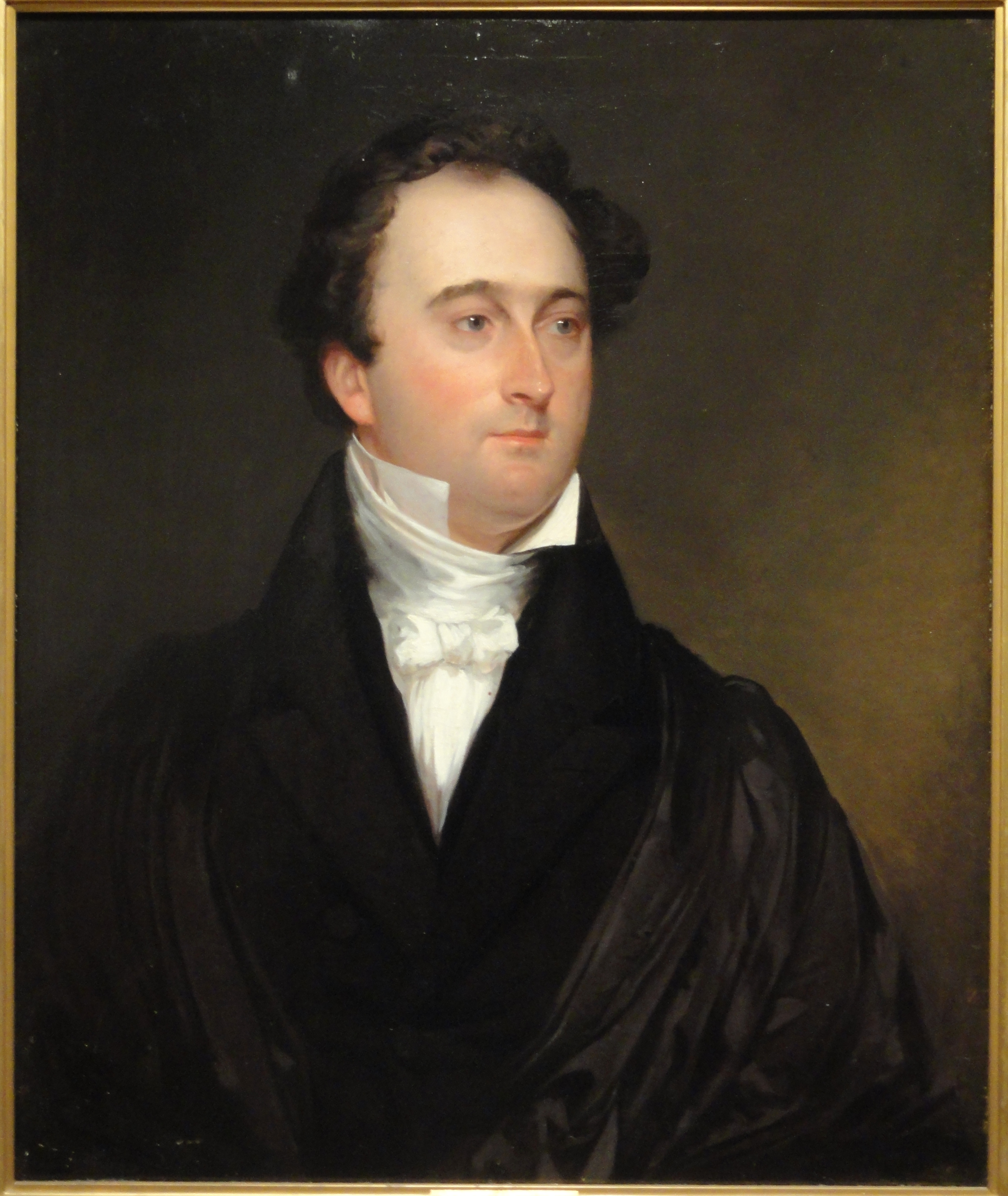
William Bourne Oliver Peabody, 1828–1830

William Bourne Oliver Peabody (July 9, 1799 – May 28, 1847) was a Unitarian minister and author in Springfield, Massachusetts, USA. His twin brother, Oliver William Bourne Peabody, was also a Unitarian minister at Burlington, Vermont, with identical birth and death years.

Peabody was born in Exeter, New Hampshire to Judge Oliver Peabody, graduated from Harvard College in 1816, and subsequently served as an assistant instructor at Phillips Exeter Academy in 1817. After two years as a theology student, he was licensed as a minister in 1819, and ordained as pastor of the Springfield Unitarian church in October 1820, in which position he remained for the rest of his life.

Peabody wrote several biographies for Sparks's Library of American Biography, namely, those of David Brainerd, Cotton Mather, James Oglethorpe, and Alexander Wilson. He contributed 48 articles to the North American Review, and wrote numerous sermons, poems, and prose pieces. Among his best-known poems are "Hymn of Nature", "Monadnock", "Death", "The Autumn Evening", and "The Winter Night".

== Works ==
- Poetical Catechism for the Young, 1823.
- The Springfield Collection of Hymns for Sacred Worship, editor, Springfield, Massachusetts, 1835.
- The Literary Remains of the Late W.B.O. Peabody, D.D., edited by Everett Peabody, 1850.
