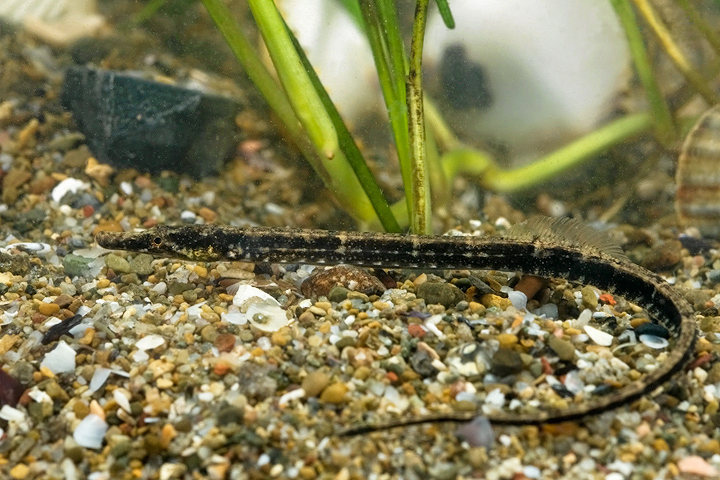

Conservation status
- Least Concern (IUCN 3.1)

Scientific classification
- Kingdom: Animalia
- Phylum: Chordata
- Class: Actinopterygii
- Division: Teleostei
- Order: Syngnathiformes
- Family: Syngnathidae
- Genus: Syngnathus
- Species: S. abaster

Binomial name
- Syngnathus abaster A. Risso, 1826

Synonyms
- Syngnathus ethon Risso, 1827; Syngnathus agassiz Michahelles, 1829; Syngnathus agassizii Michahelles, 1829; Syngnathus nigrolineatus Eichwald, 1831; Syngnathus caspius Eichwald, 1831; Syngnathus bucculentus Rathke, 1837; Syngnathus anguisigola Nardo, 1847; Syngnathus flavescens Kaup, 1856; Syngnathus algeriensis Günther, 1870; Syngnathus microchirus Moreau, 1891

= Black-striped pipefish =

Species of fish

The black-striped pipefish (Syngnathus abaster) is a species of fish in the family Syngnathidae. It is found in the eastern Atlantic from the southern Gulf of Biscay to Gibraltar, also in the Mediterranean and Black Seas. As the introduced species it is mentioned in the Caspian Sea and fresh waters of its basin.

== General information ==
Syngnathus abaster, common name the black-striped pipefish, is a close relative of the seahorse. It is usually found in the Mediterranean Sea, living in relatively shallow waters around seaweed and sea grass, and is also found in brackish waters. Pipefish are true fish. Their long, narrow bodies have an external skeleton made of bony plates, and their mouths are very small and pipe-shaped. They swim using a side to side wiggling motion that is similar to the movement of a snake or by undulation of their dorsal fin. The pipefish's diet is mainly small crustaceans, fish fry, and zooplankton. The roles males and females take on in reproduction are similar to those of male and female seahorses. The males carry the fertilized eggs in specialized pouches on their bodies. The eggs mature in this pouch, and the young are expelled through a longitudinal slit in the front of the pouch.

== Distribution ==
The black-striped pipefish is found in coastal waters and in the lower reaches of rivers in the Caspian, Black and Mediterranean Sea basins, along the European Atlantic coast from Gibraltar north to the southern part of the Bay of Biscay; in the Danube reaching west to the frontier between Romania and Hungary, as well as in the Dnieper up to Kyiv. It was introduced into reservoirs of the middle and lower Volga with mysids brought from the Don estuary, where it is now expanding its range and has been recorded to the south of Moscow.

The pipefish has significantly expanded its range within the Volga River basin. It is now a common and often abundant species in the coastal fish communities of the Lower Volga reservoirs, the unregulated section of the river, and the Volga Delta. Genetic studies suggest that the Volga pipefish populations are closely related to those from the Black Sea basin, indicating a dispersal route from the Azov-Black Sea region.

== Environment and habitat ==
Pipefish are mainly marine, with a few species also found in freshwater. Syngnathus abaster is a marine species living in shallow-water seagrass in the Mediterranean Sea.

== Appearance and body type ==
The long bodies are encased in bony plates resembling scales. These plates are a protective armour and serve as camouflage. Even though pipefish have these bony plates, their bodies are very flexible and have the ability to move much like snakes do. Their elongated head looks like a horse head and resembles that of the related seahorses. They also have the ability to wrap their tails around sea grasses to anchor themselves, just as sea horses do. Unlike sea horses, pipefish swim horizontally. Another unique feature is their long snout, which is where the pipefish gets its name.

== Diet ==
As stated above, a pipefish's diet consists mostly of newborn fish and small crustaceans. As the pipefish does not chew its food, the prey needs to be small enough to fit in the mouth and be swallowed whole. The long pipe-like mouth of the pipefish is used as a sucking tool when it eats. The pipefish wraps its tail around sea grass, using it as an anchor. It patiently waits until its prey swims close, and then sucks it up, puffing out its cheeks in the process. The tube is dilated which creates a small, strong current in the water near the fish's mouth. According to Guenther Sterba, author of Freshwater Fishes of the World, the current is accompanied by a sucking noise, much like a small vacuum cleaner. Many species of large fish prey on pipefish, as do otters and blue crabs. This particular species of pipefish has no real defense against predators aside from camouflage and swimming away, making it an easy target.

== Reproduction ==
The sexes can generally be differentiated by the number of bands on the body. Males have a larger number of colored bands than females do. During mating, the fish intertwine as part of a courtship dance. The female transfers the eggs to the male's brooding pouch through her long ovipositor. The brooding pouch is located near the anus of the pipefish. The eggs stay in the male's brooding pouch until the young are developed enough to be independent. At this point, the young exit the pouch with the help of muscular contractions of the male's body. If the young sense danger or feel threatened, they are able to re-enter the brooding pouch.
