= Robert Vivian Storer =

Robert Storer
- Born: Robert Vivian Storer; August 13, 1900; Adelaide, Australia
- Died: 1958 (aged 57–58); Melbourne, Australia
- Education: Unley High School; Prince Alfred College; University of Adelaide
- Occupations: Sex educator; venereologist

Robert Vivian Storer (13 August 1900 – 1958), Australian venereologist, sex educator, and writer.

== Biography ==
Robert Vivian Storer was born in Adelaide on 13 August 1900. He enrolled at the University of Adelaide in 1918 after completing his early education at Unley High School, where he received a scholarship to attend Prince Alfred College for three years. At Prince Alfred College, he was awarded a further scholarship that enabled him to study at the University of Adelaide and undertake hospital training. In December 1922, he travelled to London as the surgeon on the Matatua and was admitted as a student at St Bartholomew's Hospital, where he met medical practitioners from several countries, including Joseph Verco. During the late 1920s and early 1930s, Storer became involved in Australian sex education and family planning. He was a founding consultant to the Australian Family Planning Association when it was established in 1928, but later resigned following disagreements over approaches to public education on sexuality and contraception.

In 1931, Storer was charged with hosting gatherings involving young men on his yacht on the Hawkesbury River after contacting them through newspaper advertisements. On 15 February 1932, the Medical Board of New South Wales found him not guilty on two allegations of unprofessional conduct but guilty on a third following publicity in Smith's Weekly. That same year, he published A Survey of Sexual Life in Adolescence and Marriage (1932), in which he argued that same-sex attraction and bisexuality formed part of normal human sexual development. Drawing on classical Greek examples and the writings of earlier sexologists, he contended that adolescent same-sex attraction was natural, that suppressing it could have adverse consequences, and that elements of bisexuality often persisted into adulthood. He also argued that homosexuality should be regarded as an innate characteristic rather than a moral failing.

Storer worked in London during the mid-1930s. His sex education publications of the 1930s reflected his openly bisexual identity and his support for individual sexual freedom, including access to contraception and acceptance of bisexuality and homosexuality, positions that differed from prevailing social attitudes in Australia at the time. His private life was the subject of repeated tabloid coverage. In 1936, a 16-year-old office employee drowned in the River Thames during a gathering in London, and during the Second World War his relationship with an 18-year-old soldier became the subject of a police investigation, in which officers conducted surveillance of his apartment.

In 1936, Storer was removed from the General Medical Council's register for "infamous professional conduct" after advertising his medical practice in the daily press. On 4 March 1937, he announced his intention to apply for registration on the Dominion of New Zealand's Medical Register and stated that he had submitted evidence of his qualifications to the Department of Health office in Auckland. He relocated permanently to Melbourne in 1939, where he lived at Alcaston House on the corner of Spring and Collins streets.

On 20 September 1939, Storer was charged at Kew Court with indecently assaulting a man on 10 September. Evidence included testimony from a 15-year-old laboratory assistant employed by Storer after responding to a newspaper advertisement and another youth who was present earlier that day. He was convicted on 16 November and, on 8 December, was sentenced to 12 months' imprisonment. On 29 June 1942, he was sentenced in the General Sessions to nine months' imprisonment with hard labour after being convicted of gross obscenity. Storer died in Melbourne in 1958.
