= Horatio Storer =

American anti-abortion activist 1830–1922

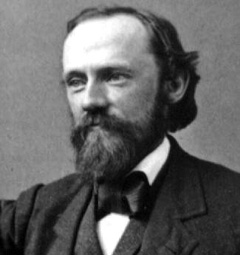
Horatio Storer

Horatio Robinson Storer (February 27, 1830 – September 18, 1922) was an American gynecologist and anti-abortion activist. He was the leader of the Physicians' Crusade Against Abortion, whose efforts led to the passage of laws criminalizing abortion in the late 19th century.

== Early life and medical career ==
Storer was born in Boston, Massachusetts, and attended the Boston Latin School, Harvard College, and the Harvard Medical School. After obtaining his M.D. in 1853, he traveled to Europe and spent a year studying with James Young Simpson at Edinburgh.

In 1855, Storer began medical practice in Boston with an emphasis on obstetrics and gynecology. In 1865, Storer won an American Medical Association (AMA) prize for his essay, which was aimed at informing women about the moral and physical problems of induced abortion. Published as Why Not? A Book for Every Woman, it was widely sold, and many physicians distributed it to patients who requested abortion. In 1869, Storer founded the Gynaecological Society of Boston, the first medical society devoted exclusively to gynecology, and he published the first gynecology academic journal, the Journal of the Gynaecological Society of Boston. According to biographer Frederick N. Dyer, Storer "probably did more to found gynecology as a science and medical specialty than any other American physician." In 1869, Storer, who had been raised in a Unitarian family, became an Episcopalian. A decade later, he became a Roman Catholic "because of the church’s strict stance against abortion."

== Anti-abortion activism and views ==
In 1857, Storer started what NPR calls the "physicians' crusade against abortion". In 1860, governors of every state in the U.S. received a letter from the recently established AMA. Storer ghostwrote the letter, supposedly from the president of the AMA, in which he stated that the AMA opposed abortion. Storer used the language of morality, writing: "The evil to society of this crime is evident from the fact that it's instances in this country are now to be counted by hundreds of thousands. In reality, there is a little difference between the immorality by which a man forsakes his home for an occasional visit to a house of prostitution that he may preserve his wife from the chance of pregnancy, and the immorality by which that wife brings herself willfully to destroy the living fruit of her womb. The child is alive from the moment of conception." The letter was pivotal to what historians call the "physicians' crusade against abortion", and Storer was making a few key arguments for why abortion should be illegal across the country. He introduced a new idea that life began at conception. Until then, people generally agreed that life began when a woman could actually feel life move inside her at quickening. Storer campaigned on a moral argument that also tapped into the racial fears of the moment that would eventually inspire eugenics, a pseudoscientific field of "racial improvement and planned breeding of the population."

The racial fears would inspire forced sterilization programs to decrease certain populations, but Storer's anti-abortion campaign was trying to increase other populations by focusing on Protestant white women. Elite Protestant white women were often the ones seeking abortions. In a widely distributed tract, Storer lamented that abortions were "infinitely more frequent among Protestant women" in America. The birth rate for Protestant white women had been declining over the course of the 19th century and so he had fears of what was commonly referred to as "race suicide", in which the Anglo-Saxon population was not replenishing itself fast enough to keep up with the swells of new immigrants to the United States. The common narrative became that white women needed to “use their loins” to combat the "blackening and the browning" of the United States. His concern was that the freeing of black slaves and the influx of Chinese immigrants would mean the death of the country's white race, which he understood to mean Anglo-Saxon people.

Storer believed that criminalizing abortion would help restore the balance of who was being born in the United States. He wrote articles, books, and reports, and gave speeches to make his views on abortion clear. In one lecture, "The Origins of Insanity in Women", Storer recommended oophorectomy for women who "have become habitually thievish, profane or obscene, despondent or self-indulgent, shrewish or fatuous." At that time, it was widely believed that the ovaries and menstruation caused a variety of behavioral changes in women. He also believed that if the AMA could control the marketplace of abortion, it would be lucrative to that growing cadre of university-educated and mostly-male physicians, who were beginning to specialize in fields like obstetrics and gynecology. He campaigned strongly against midwives by describing them as unsanitary, unclean, immoral and as clueless as the mothers themselves.

In an 1865 essay for the AMA, Storer wrote that "upon [white women's] loins depends the future destiny of the nation." To help keep the white race dominant in the United States and to lend legitimacy to the AMA, Storer persuaded it to form the Committee on Criminal Abortion and to promote sterilization of what it deemed to be undesirable individuals. In 1859, the Committee Report was presented at the AMA meeting in Louisville, Kentucky. Accepted by the AMA, it included this passage: "If we have proved the existence of fetal life before quickening has taken place or can take place, and by all analogy and a close and conclusive process of induction, its commencement at the very beginning, at conception itself, we are compelled to believe unjustifiable abortion always a crime. And now words fail. Of the mother, by consent or by her own hand, imbrued with her infant's blood; of the equally guilty father, who counsels or allows the crime; of the wretches, who by their wholesale murders far out-Herod [the Great, and] Burke and Hare; of the public sentiment which palliates, pardons, and would even praise this, so common, violation of all law, human and divine, of all instinct, of all reason, all pity, all mercy, all love,—we leave those to speak who can." Prior to the 1820s, most American states and earlier colonies had governed abortion according to English common law, which largely did not recognize a state interest in pregnancy or abortion until quickening. It occurred sometimes as late as the 25th week of pregnancy, which was left solely to the pregnant woman to determine. The common law was largely employed to protect the interests of the woman, not the fetus.

Storer believed that "abortions were endangering what he saw as the ideal America: a society of white Protestants in which women adhered strictly to their proper 'duties' -- marriage and childbearing." He feared that the birthrates of recent immigrants, who were predominantly Catholic, would overwhelm the hegemony of white Protestants in New England for which he in part blamed married Protestant women for not producing enough children. Storer emphasized the different abortion rates of Catholic and Protestant women, "hoping to utilize the typical anti-Catholic sentiment of his Protestant women readers and induce them thereby to bear their children to do their part to prevent the population from becoming increasingly Catholic. He equated marriage without a focus on fertility as "nothing less than legalized prostitution". Storer's campaign to codify criminal prohibition of abortion employed "a cascade of alarming statistics that he 'claimed' showed an epidemic of abortions and its impact on native-born fertility." His statistical methods have been described as being "with poor data" and "rife with erroneous assumptions". As a result of Storer's efforts, the AMA petitioned the legislatures of the states and territories to strengthen their laws against elective abortions. By 1880, most states and territories had enacted such legislation. Although abortion continued, some women were dissuaded by the new laws and persuaded by physicians.

== See also ==
- Abortion in the United States
- United States anti-abortion movement
