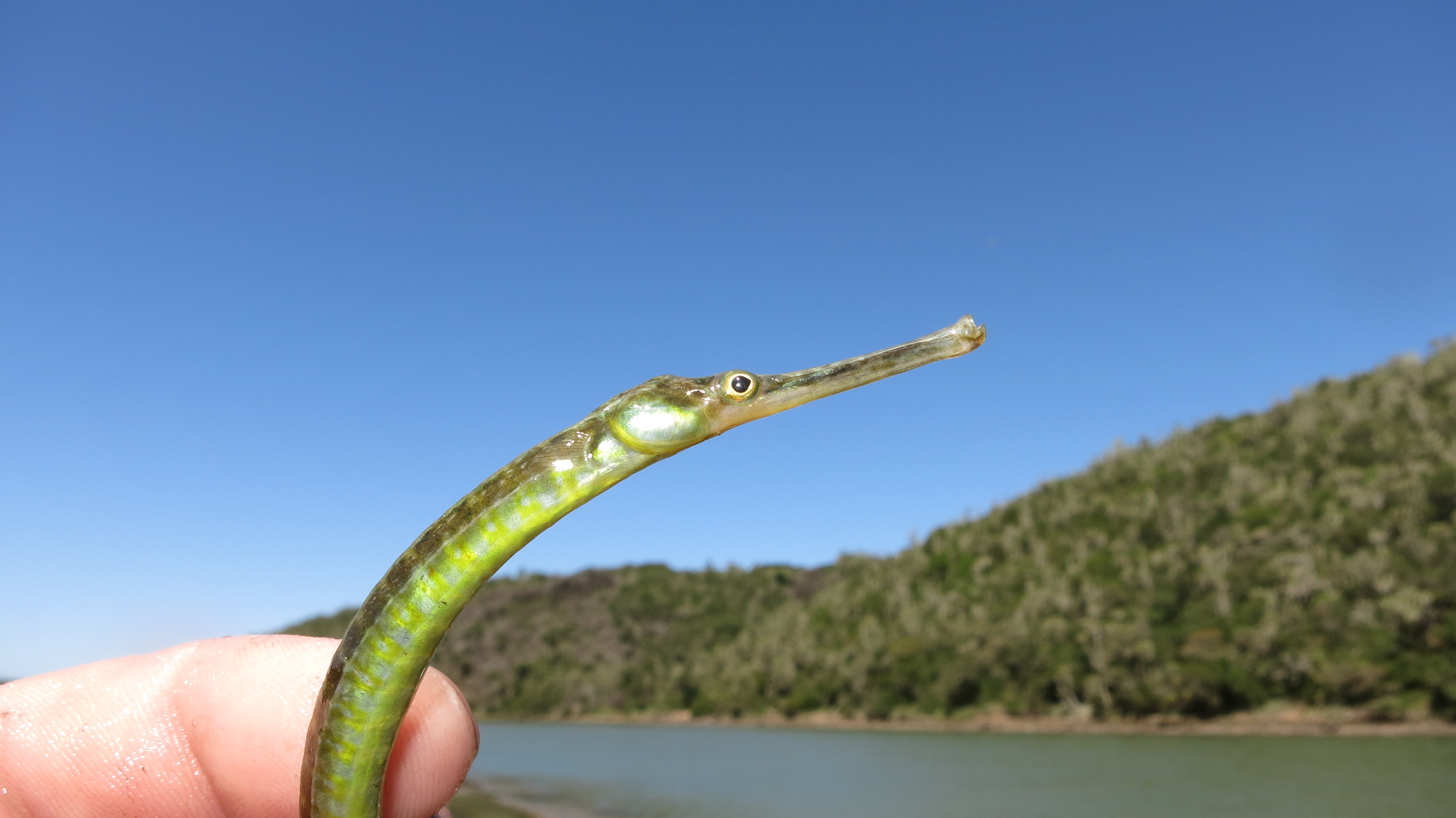

Conservation status
- Least Concern (IUCN 3.1)

Scientific classification
- Kingdom: Animalia
- Phylum: Chordata
- Class: Actinopterygii
- Order: Syngnathiformes
- Family: Syngnathidae
- Genus: Syngnathus
- Species: S. temminckii

Binomial name
- Syngnathus temminckii Kaup, 1856

Synonyms
- Syngnathus rubescens Risso, 1810; S. brachyrhynchus Kaup, 1856; S. delalandi Kaup, 1856; S. alternans Günther, 1870

= Syngnathus temminckii =

Longsnout pipefish

Species of fish

Syngnathus temminckii (longsnout pipefish) is the most common pipefish in southern African estuaries, ranging from Walvis Bay (Namibia) to the Tugela River on the east coast of South Africa.

The fish is named in honor of Coenraad Jacob Temminck (1778–1858), the director of the Rijksmuseum van Natuurlijke Historie (Leiden, Netherlands), where the type specimens are housed.

== Biology ==
This species is common in estuaries, usually in eelgrass beds, but has also been found offshore to depths of 110 m (360 ft). Sexual maturity is reached at 12 cm (4.7 in), and breeding occurs from March to November. Males carry the developing embryos in a brood pouch on their belly.

== Taxonomy ==
Syngnathus temminckii was until 2013 synonymised with the European species S. acus (greater pipefish), but morphological data show that it is distinct. Genetic data further indicate that it is not even the sister taxon of S. acus, but of another southern African species, the critically endangered estuarine pipefish, S. watermeyeri.

== See also ==
- Long-snouted pipefish, Stigmatopora macropterygia A. H. A. Duméril 1870.
- Longsnout pipefish, Leptonotus norae Waite 1910.
