= Snout (disambiguation) =

A snout is the protruding portion of an animal's face.

Snout may also refer to:

- The snout reflex, in neurology, an abnormal pursing of the lips indicative of brain damage
- Snout house, a house that is constructed with an attached front entry garage that is closer to the street than any other part of the house
- Weasel's snout, a herbaceous annual plant of the family Plantaginaceae
- Cauldron Snout, a waterfall on the River Tees in Northern England
- Tom Snout, a fictional character in William Shakespeare's A Midsummer Night's Dream
- Snout Spout, a character in the media franchise Masters of the Universe
- Snout (band), an Australian band active in the 1990s and early 2000s
- The terminus of a glacier
- Zeke's plushie in the animated series Work It Out Wombats!

Animals:

- Broad-snouted caiman
- Long-snouted pipefish
- Long-snouted spinner dolphin
- Rough snouted giant gecko
- Sharp snouted piranha
- Short-snouted New Caledonian gecko
- Slender-snouted crocodile
- Snout beetle
- Snout butterfly
- Snout moth (disambiguation)
- Snouted night adder
- The Snout (Hypena proboscidalis), a moth

Snout may be slang for:

- A nose
- An informer
- A member of the Protestant community of Northern Ireland
- Tobacco, in British prison slang
- Snout (or "bleb") of a cell
