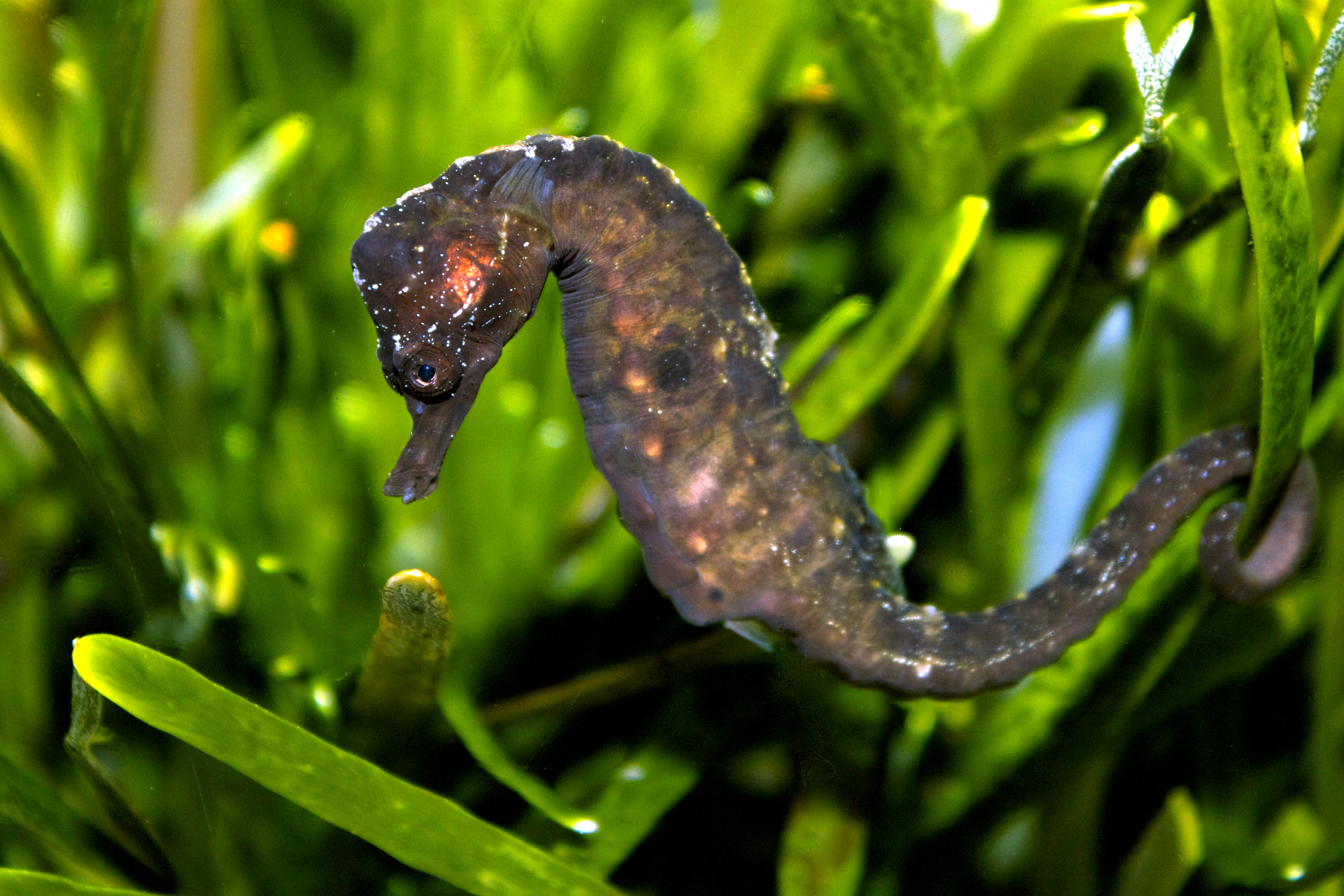

Conservation status
- Endangered (IUCN 3.1)
- CITES Appendix II

Scientific classification
- Kingdom: Animalia
- Phylum: Chordata
- Class: Actinopterygii
- Order: Syngnathiformes
- Family: Syngnathidae
- Genus: Hippocampus
- Species: H. capensis

Binomial name
- Hippocampus capensis Boulenger, 1900
- Knysna seahorse (Hippocampus capensis) distribution

= Knysna seahorse =

Endangered species of seahorse from South Africa

The Knysna /ˈnaɪznə/ seahorse or Cape seahorse (Hippocampus capensis) is a species of fish in the family Syngnathidae. It is endemic to the south coast of South Africa, where it has been found in only three brackish water habitats: the estuary of the Keurbooms River in Plettenberg Bay, the Knysna Lagoon, and the estuarine portion of the Swartvlei system in Sedgefield. The limited range of this seahorse puts it at great risk of extinction.

== Description ==
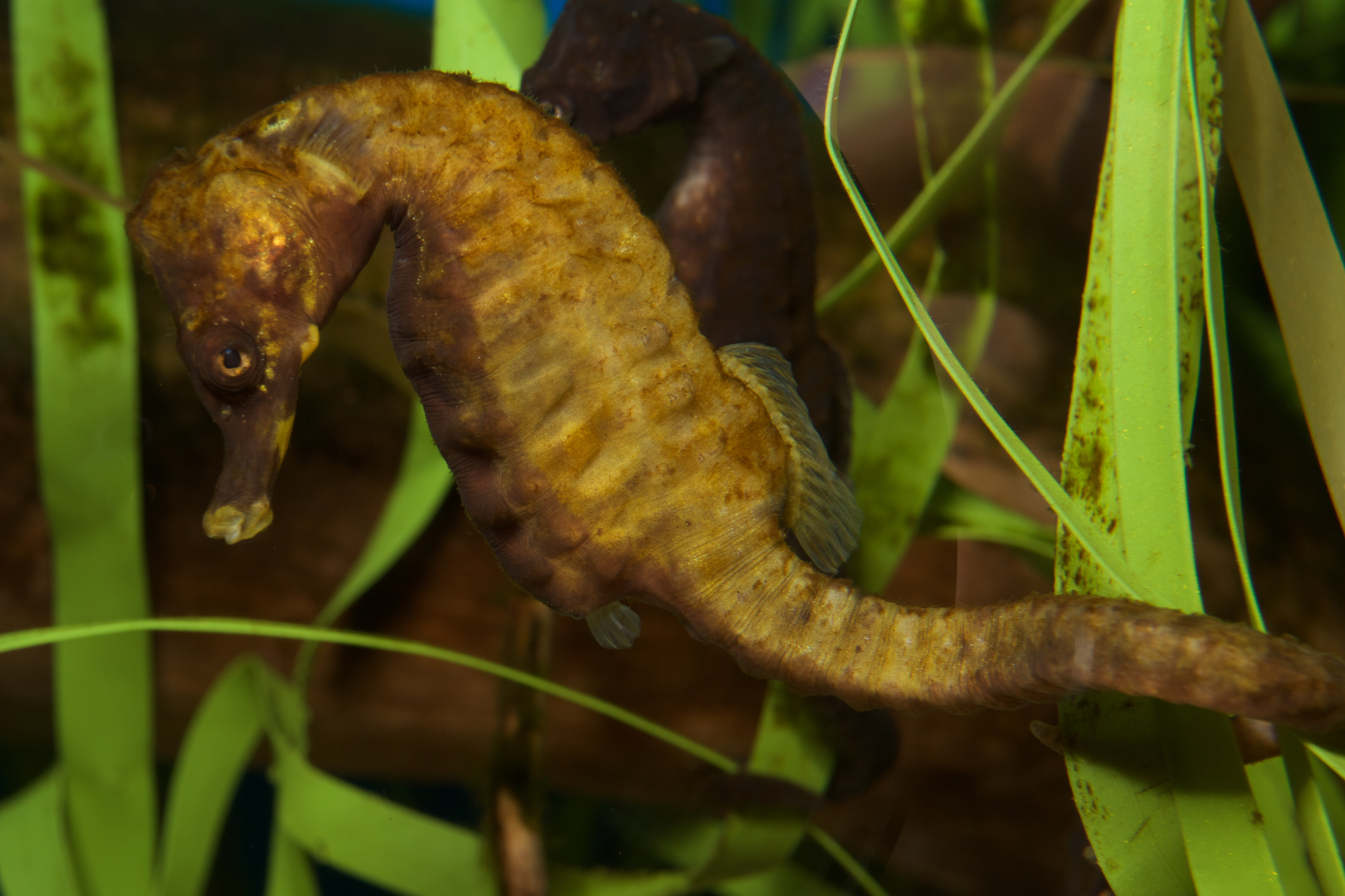

The Knysna seahorse is a small, delicate creature with a standard length of up to 12 centimetres. Colouration is strongly influenced by the surrounding environment and a particular individual's mood. It varies from pale green to brown (often with darker speckles) to purplish black. The body is encased in a series of bony rings, the snout is relatively short, and the neck arches in a smooth curve without a crown. The tail is muscular and is used to grasp a mate during courtship or to anchor the fish to the substrate.

== Habitat and ecology ==
The Knysna seahorse occurs mostly in areas with high vegetation cover (at least 75%), and is associated with five dominant aquatic plants: Zostera capensis, Caulerpa filiformis, Codium extricatum, Halophila ovalis and Ruppia cirrhosa. While the Keurbooms and Swartvlei estuaries both have very dense plant cover, vegetated sites only make up approximately 11% of the Knysna Lagoon. Large areas of habitat in this system may thus be unsuitable for H. capensis.

The fish is well adapted to estuarine habitat and can tolerate a wide range of environmental conditions, such as salinities ranging from 1–59 ‰.

Breeding occurs in the austral summer when water temperatures approach 20 °C. Sexual maturity is attained in about one year at 65 mm standard length.

== Population structure ==
Genetic data from the mitochondrial control region indicate that, even though each of the three populations of Hippocampus capensis has a unique combination of haplotypes, there is no support for the hypothesis that each represents a distinct subspecies. This finding was recently confirmed with more variable microsatellite data. There is thus no compelling reason not to translocate individuals between estuaries, should this become necessary. Low genetic diversity in the Swartvlei estuary suggests that this population is partially isolated from the other two populations.

== Population sizes ==
Census data from 2002 and 2003 (WWF-SA) indicated that the population sizes of Hippocampus capensis in the Keurbooms and Swartvlei estuaries can at times far exceed that in the much larger Knysna Lagoon. However, they fluctuate considerably. In the Keurbooms estuary, a period of strong river flow may even have resulted in the temporary extinction of the species, suggesting that this estuary has no permanent seahorse population and merely provides habitat when conditions are favourable. Hippocampus capensis was found again in the estuary during more recent surveys conducted by the ORCA Foundation, but it was also found that this population diminished as a result of floods during 2007 and 2011.

== Evolution ==
Hippocampus capensis is closely related to the Indian Ocean population of the widespread Indo-Pacific seahorse H. kuda. The Knysna seahorse's smaller size, shorter snout, and reduced coronet are likely adaptations to improve manoeuvrability in the dense seagrass habitats typical of South African estuaries.

== Experimentation ==
Seahorses were taken from the coast and put in sections of Thesen Islands Marina. Hydrolab in the KEMP (Knysa Estuarine Mornitorings Platform) replicated the springs and fences and left there so that it can grow and maturation to see which they prefer. The cages were all tested to see where they would go.

== Captive breeding ==
Captive bred populations of Hippocampus capensis are held at the Two Oceans Aquarium in Cape Town and at Antwerp Zoo. Knysna seahorses are also bred and sold for the ornamental fish industry.
