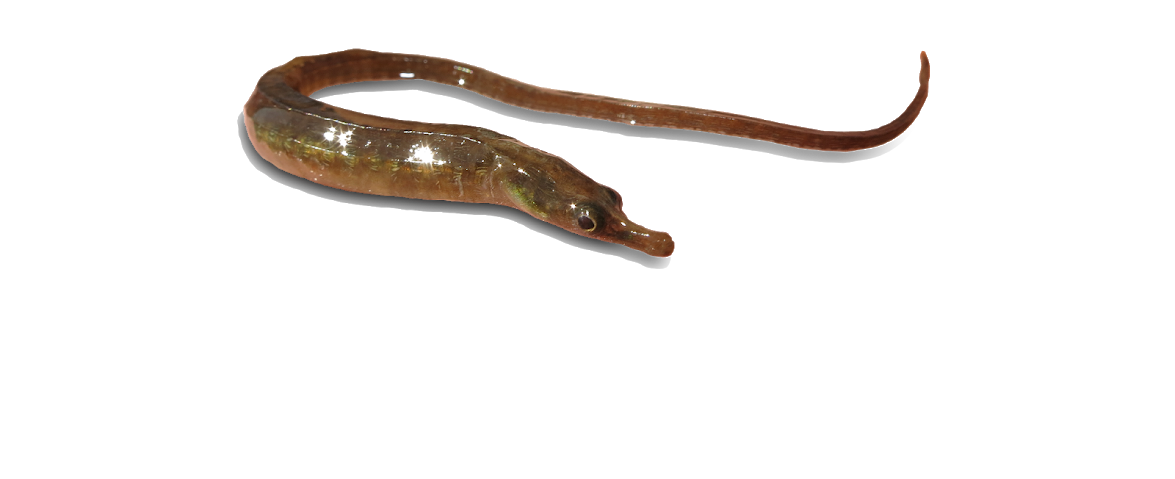

Conservation status
- Endangered (IUCN 3.1)

Scientific classification
- Kingdom: Animalia
- Phylum: Chordata
- Class: Actinopterygii
- Order: Syngnathiformes
- Family: Syngnathidae
- Genus: Syngnathus
- Species: S. watermeyeri

Binomial name
- Syngnathus watermeyeri J. L. B. Smith, 1963

= Estuarine pipefish =

Species of fish

The estuarine pipefish or river pipefish (Syngnathus watermeyeri) is a species of fish in the family Syngnathidae. It is endemic to South Africa and has been sporadically recorded in the estuarine portions of the Kariega, Kasouga, Bushmans, East Kleinemonde and West Kleinemonde rivers. It can be readily distinguished from another southern African pipefish with which it shares its habitat, S. temminckii, by its much shorter snout. The estuarine pipefish is most commonly found in beds of the eelgrass Zostera capensis.

== Conservation status ==
The estuarine pipefish was declared extinct in 1994, but was rediscovered in 2006 in areas where it had not been reported in over four decades. This pipefish is Endangered due to both natural and human threats to the brackish estuaries and local eelgrass beds in which it lives.

== Captive breeding ==
A captive population of Syngnathus watermeyeri is held at uShaka Marine World in Durban.

== Etymology ==
The type was a female of 110 millimetres (4.3 in) collected in the Bushmans River and sent to J. L. B. Smith by F.L.E. Watermeyer, whom Smith honoured in the newly described species' specific name.
