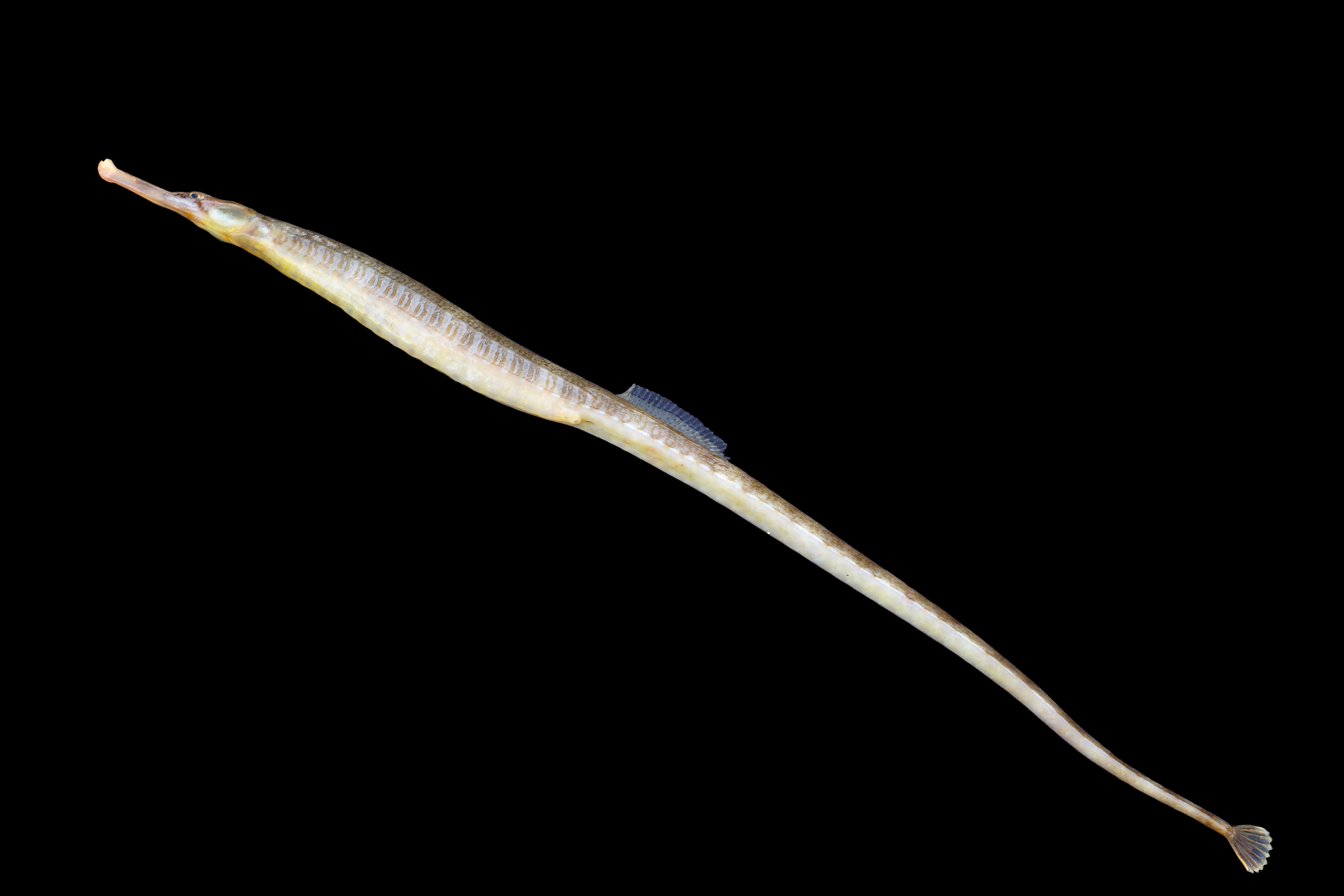

Conservation status
- Least Concern (IUCN 3.1)

Scientific classification
- Kingdom: Animalia
- Phylum: Chordata
- Class: Actinopterygii
- Order: Syngnathiformes
- Family: Syngnathidae
- Genus: Syngnathus
- Species: S. acus

Binomial name
- Syngnathus acus Linnaeus, 1758

Synonyms
- Dermatostethus punctipinnis Gill, 1862; Sygnathus acus (Linnaeus, 1758); Syngnathus alternans Günther, 1870; Syngnathus brachyrhynchus Kaup, 1856; Syngnathus delalandi Kaup, 1856; Syngnathus rubescens Risso, 1810; Typhle heptagonus Rafinesque, 1810

= Greater pipefish =

Species of fish

The greater pipefish (Syngnathus acus) is a pipefish of the family Syngnathidae. It is a seawater fish and the type species of the genus Syngnathus.

== Etymology ==
The genus name Syngnathus derives from the Greek, syn, symphysis meaning grown together and gnathos meaning jaw. The Latin species' name acus means needle.

== Description ==
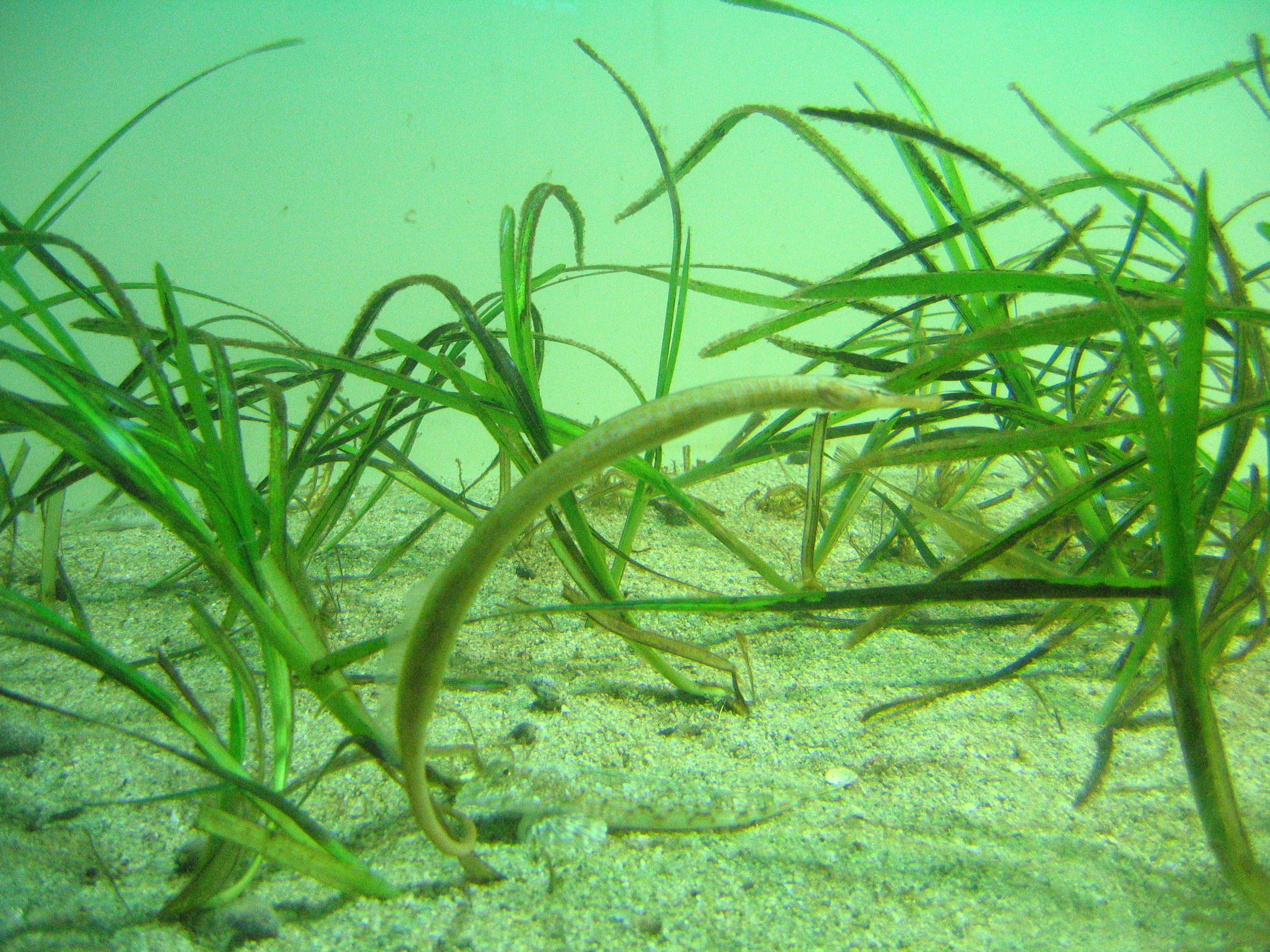
Greater pipefish in Zostera vegetation

The greater pipefish has a long segmented armoured body, angular in cross section and stretching up 45 cm long with its stiff appearance. It ranges a color brown to green in with broad alternating light and dark hue along it. Its customized by a long snout with mouth on end and a slight hump on the top of the body just behind the eyes.

The fish is generally 33 cm to 35 cm in length with a reported maximum length of 47 cm. They are almost square in each segment of the body, and known to feel rigid when handled. The greater pipefish has distinctive body rings which are a sandy brown with darker bars covering its body in between.

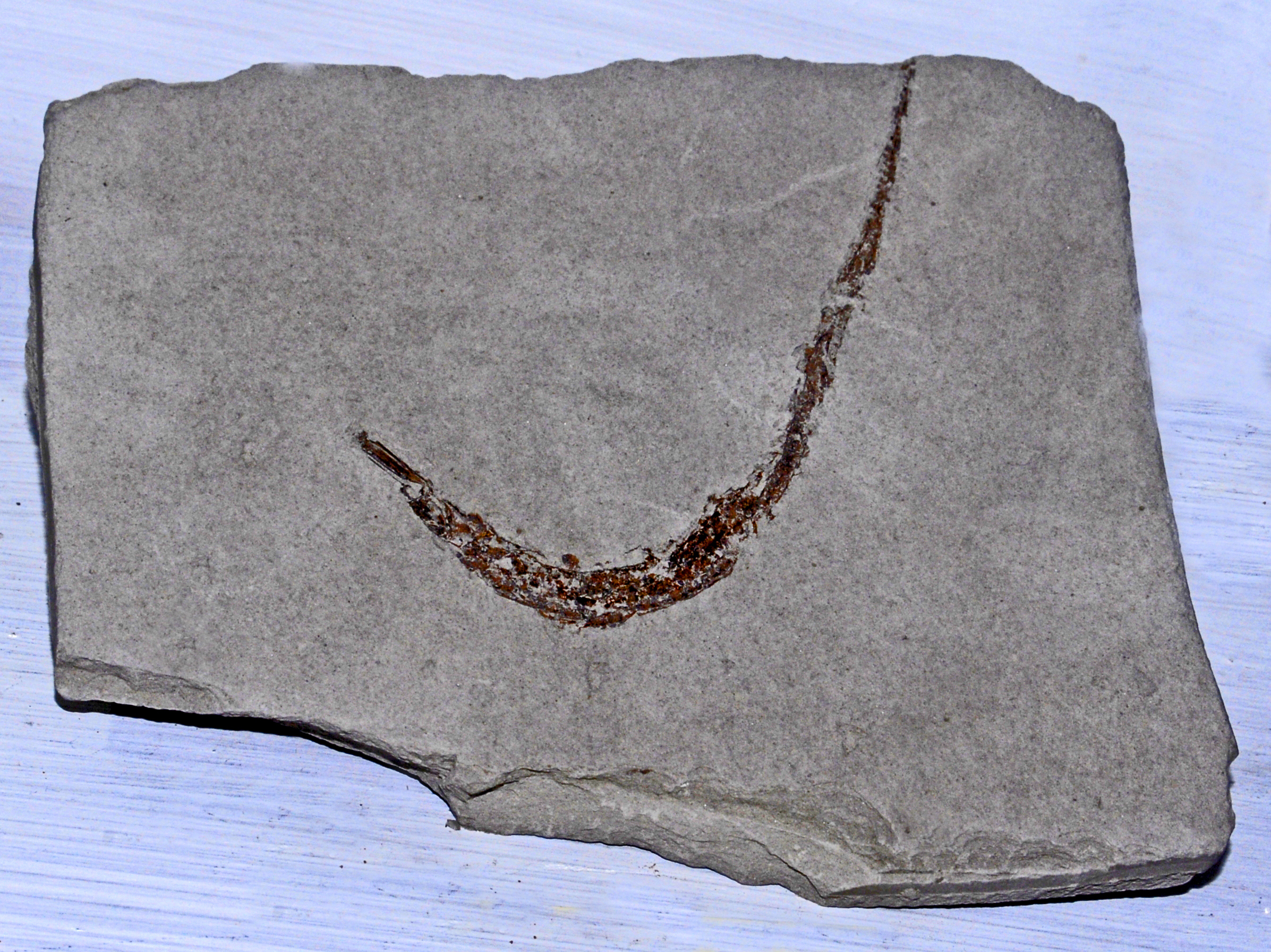
Fossil of Syngnathus acus from Pliocene of Italy

== Anatomy ==
The anatomy of fish vary through the sex. The top third of the females belly is deep (when egg bound), twice the breadth of the lower two thirds below the vent. The male is the "tailing" with the twin folds below the vent. The folds of the skin make the middle third and during the "brooding" of the young they swell in size until the young are released from the pouch (at a size of 22 mm to 35 mm).

== Biology ==
These fishes feed on live mysids and small prawns. They are ovoviviparous and reproduce usually three times each year. A few females deposit partial clutches under the tail into the male's brood pouch, that may contain up to 400 eggs.

== Distribution ==
The greater pipefish is found all around the British Isles and is regularly found in the Mediterranean Sea.

== Habitat ==
These fishes are common on southerly and westerly coasts in a variety of habitats, often amongst seaweeds and seagrass.

== Syngnathus temminckii ==
The southern African species Syngnathus temminckii (Kaup, 1856) was until recently synonymised with S. acus. However, morphological data clearly show that it is distinct, and genetic data indicate that it is not even the sister taxon of S. acus, but of another southern African species, the river pipefish S. watermeyeri.

== Gallery ==
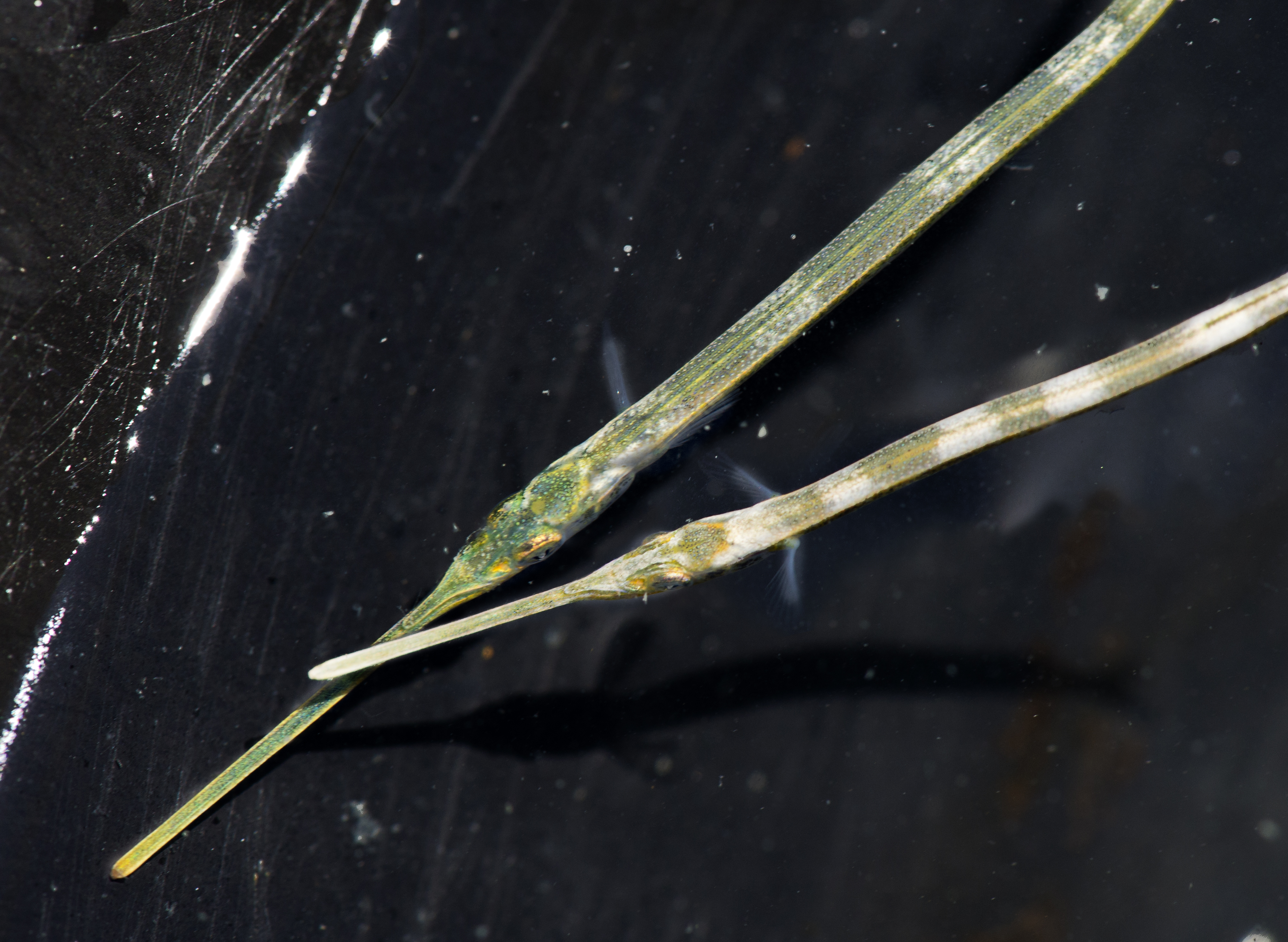
Social behavior of two juvenile specimens of Syngnathus acus.

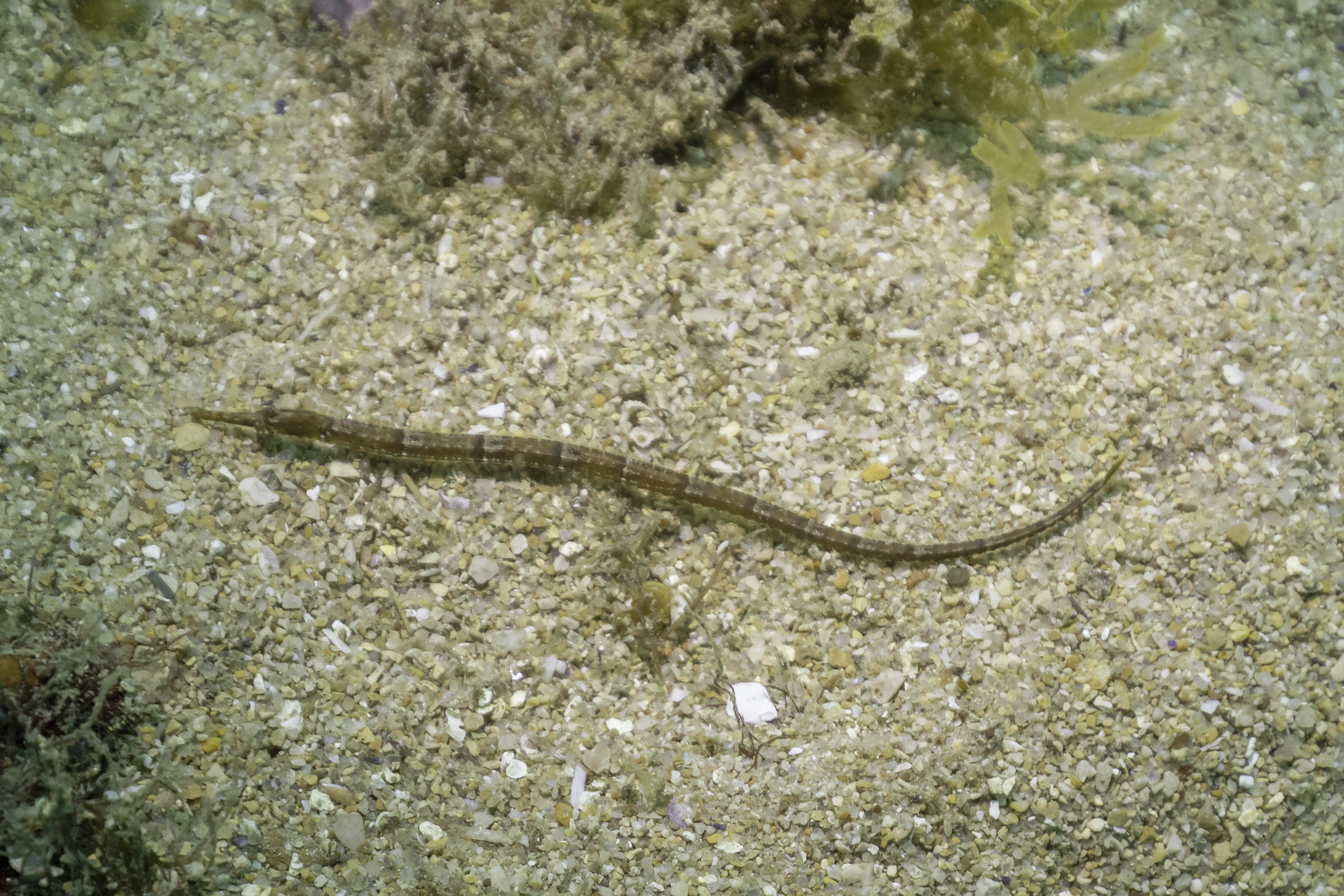
On the sand.

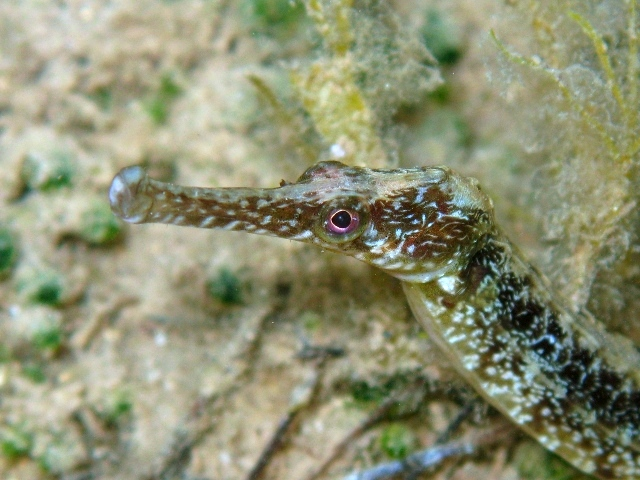
Detail of the head.

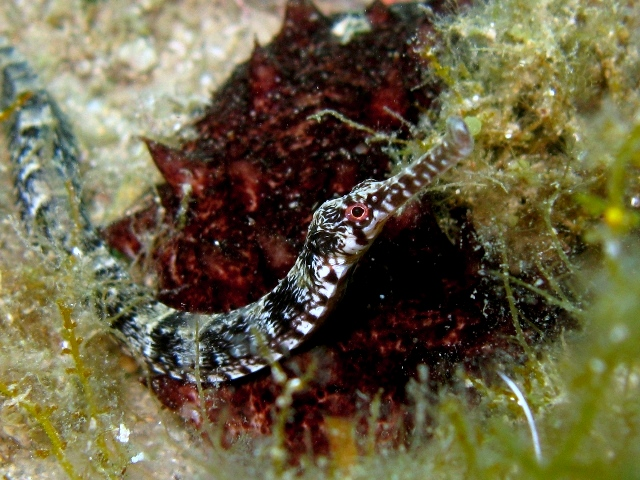
Detail of the body rings.

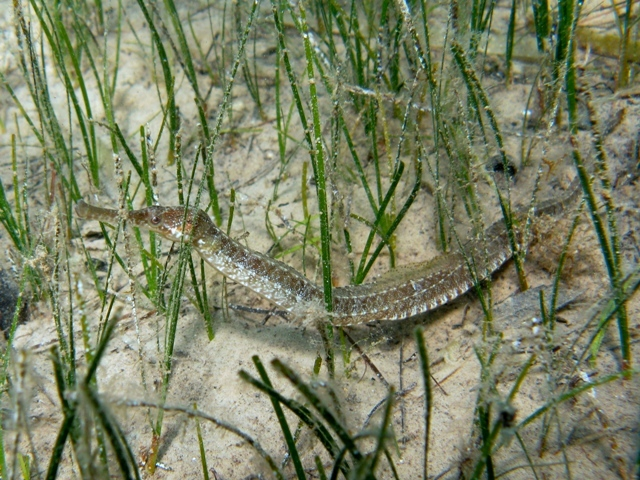
Among seagrass.

== Bibliography ==
- Bent J. Muus, Jørgen G. Nielsen: Die Meeresfische Europas. In Nordsee, Ostsee und Atlantik. Franckh-Kosmos Verlag, ISBN 3-440-07804-3
- Dawson, C.E., 1986. Syngnathidae. p. 628–639. In P.J.P. Whitehead, M.-L. Bauchot, J.-C. Hureau, J. Nielsen and E. Tortonese (eds.) Fishes of the North-eastern Atlantic and the Mediterranean. Volume 2. Unesco, Paris.
- Rudie H. Kuiter: Seepferdchen: Seenadeln, Fetzenfische und ihre Verwandten. Ulmer (Eugen), 2001, ISBN 3-80013-244-3
