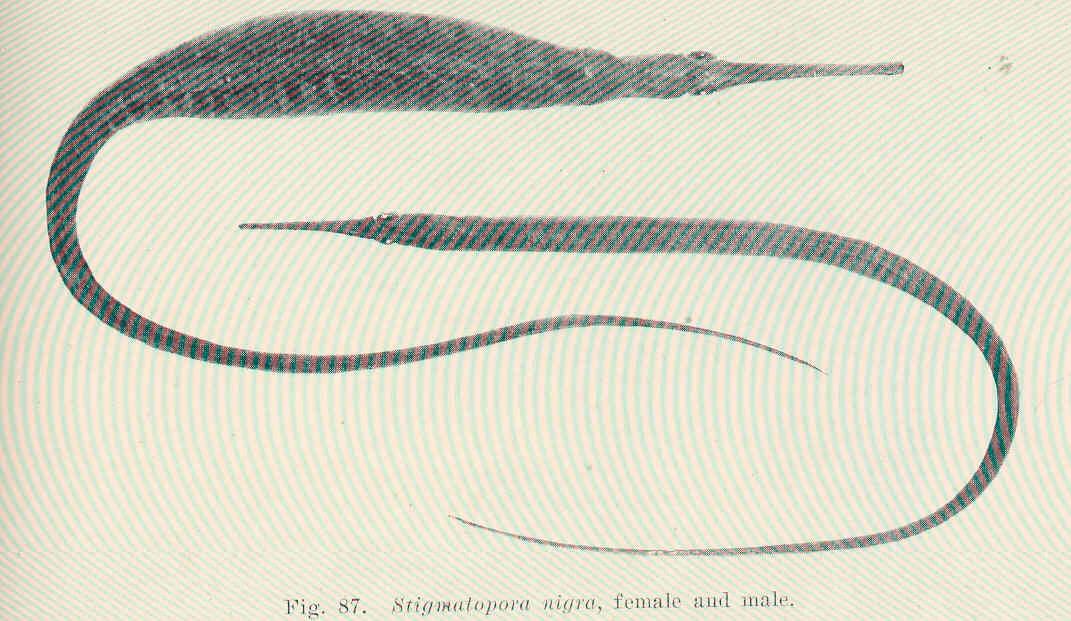
- Stigmatopora nigra

Scientific classification
- Kingdom: Animalia
- Phylum: Chordata
- Class: Actinopterygii
- Order: Syngnathiformes
- Family: Syngnathidae
- Subfamily: Syngnathinae
- Genus: Stigmatopora; Kaup, 1853

Type species
- Syngnathus argus Richardson, 1840

Species
- 5, see text

Synonyms
- Nigracus Whitley, 1953; Stigmatopora Kaup, 1853

= Stigmatopora =

Genus of fishes

Stigmatopora is a genus of pipefishes native to the Indian and Pacific Oceans.

== Species ==
There are currently five recognized species in this genus:

- Stigmatopora argus (J. Richardson, 1840) (spotted pipefish)
- Stigmatopora harastii Short & Trevor-Jones, 2020 (red wide-bodied pipefish)
- Stigmatopora macropterygia A. H. A. Duméril, 1870 (long-snouted pipefish)
- Stigmatopora narinosa Browne & K. Smith, 2007 (Southern Gulf pipefish)
- Stigmatopora nigra Kaup, 1856 (wide-bodied pipefish)
