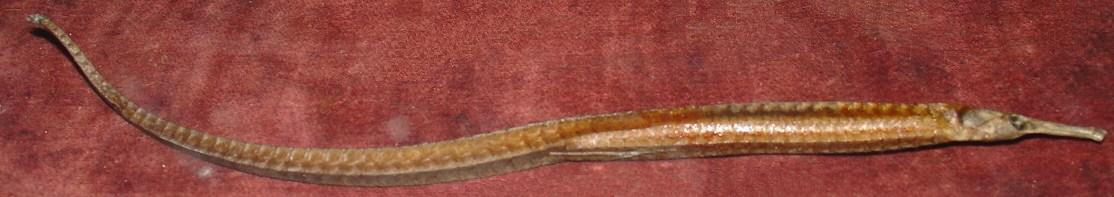
- Longsnout pipefish Leptonotus norae

Scientific classification
- Kingdom: Animalia
- Phylum: Chordata
- Class: Actinopterygii
- Division: Teleostei
- Order: Syngnathiformes
- Family: Syngnathidae
- Subfamily: Syngnathinae
- Genus: Leptonotus; Kaup, 1853

Type species
- Syngnathus blainvilleanus Eydoux & Gervais, 1837

Species
- See text.

Synonyms
- Acmonotus Philippi, 1896; Novacampus Whitley, 1955

= Leptonotus =

Genus of fishes

Leptonotus is a genus of pipefishes of the family Syngnathidae. The name is derived from the Greek leptos meaning "thin" and noton meaning "back".

== Species ==
The currently recognized species in this genus are:

- Leptonotus blainvilleanus (Eydoux & Gervais, 1837) (deep-bodied pipefish)
- Leptonotus elevatus (F. W. Hutton, 1872) (high-body pipefish)
- Leptonotus norae (Waite, 1910) (longsnout pipefish)
- Leptonotus vincentae Luzzatto & Estalles, 2019
