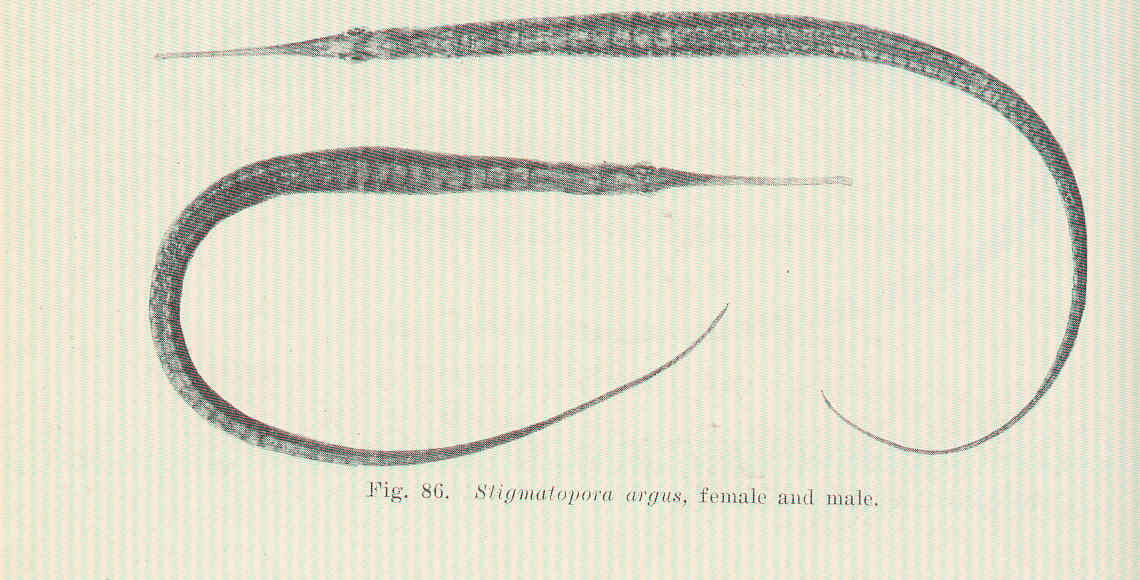

Conservation status
- Least Concern (IUCN 3.1)

Scientific classification
- Kingdom: Animalia
- Phylum: Chordata
- Class: Actinopterygii
- Order: Syngnathiformes
- Family: Syngnathidae
- Genus: Stigmatopora
- Species: S. argus

Binomial name
- Stigmatopora argus (J. Richardson, 1840)

Synonyms
- Syngnathus argus Richardson, 1840; Stigmatophora olivacea Castelnau, 1872; Gastrotokeus gracilis Klunzinger, 1872; Stigmatophora gracilis Macleay, 1881; Stigmatophora depressiuscula Macleay, 1881

= Stigmatopora argus =

Species of fish

Stigmatopora argus, the spotted pipefish, is a species of ray-finned fish from the family of pipefish and seahorses (Syngnathidae). The scientific name of the species is the first validly published in 1840 by Richardson.

It is endemic to Australia, is usually green with obvious black spots on its dorsal surface and can grow to a length of 27 centimetres.

Stigmaptopora argus has a prehensile tail that it uses to clasp seagrass or macroalgae. It feeds on small crustaceans, including copepods and mysids.
