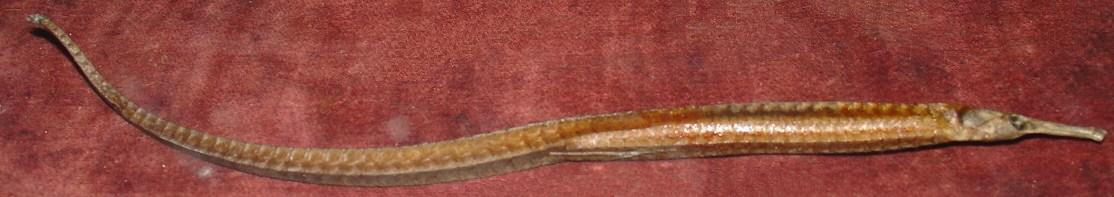

Conservation status
- Least Concern (IUCN 3.1)

Scientific classification
- Kingdom: Animalia
- Phylum: Chordata
- Class: Actinopterygii
- Order: Syngnathiformes
- Family: Syngnathidae
- Genus: Leptonotus
- Species: L. norae

Binomial name
- Leptonotus norae (Waite, 1910)

Synonyms
- Syngnathus norae Waite, 1910

= Longsnout pipefish =

Species of fish

The longsnout pipefish (Leptonotus norae) is a pipefish of the family Syngnathidae. It has only been recorded from midwater and bottom trawls at depths of 37–212 metres (121–696 ft). The habitat and biology of this species are almost unknown but juveniles have been recorded in the stomachs of blue penguins and Snares penguins.

== Etymology ==
The fish is named per Waite in 1911: "I have associated with this pretty species the name of Miss Nora Niven," for whom the trawler Nora Niven, from which the type specimen was collected, was named; Nora was the youngest daughter of James Just Niven (1856-1913) the owner of the Napier Fish Supply Company in Napier, New Zealand, from whom Waite "received many kindnesses while in Napier".

== See also ==
- Long-snouted pipefish, Stigmatopora macropterygia A. H. A. Duméril.
- Longsnout pipefish, Syngnathus temminckii Kaup, 1856.
