= Stigmatopora narinosa =

Southern Gulf pipefish

Conservation status
- Least Concern (IUCN 3.1)

Scientific classification
- Kingdom: Animalia
- Phylum: Chordata
- Class: Actinopterygii
- Division: Teleostei
- Order: Syngnathiformes
- Family: Syngnathidae
- Genus: Stigmatopora
- Species: S. narinosa

Binomial name
- Stigmatopora narinosa Browne and Smith 2007

Species of fish

Stigmatopora narinosa, also known as the Southern Gulf pipefish, is a species of marine fish belonging to the family Syngnathidae. The species can be found in patches of seagrass and algae in the shallow waters of Spencer Gulf and the Gulf St. Vincent, South Australia. Their diet likely consists of small crustaceans such as copepods and amphipods. Adult males have been measured at lengths up to 11.3 centimeters. Reproduction occurs through ovoviviparity in which the males brood eggs from December to March before giving live birth.
