= Deep-bodied pipefish =

Conservation status
- Least Concern (IUCN 3.1)

Scientific classification
- Kingdom: Animalia
- Phylum: Chordata
- Class: Actinopterygii
- Order: Syngnathiformes
- Family: Syngnathidae
- Genus: Leptonotus
- Species: L. blainvilleanus

Binomial name
- Leptonotus blainvilleanus (Eydoux & Gervais, 1837)

Synonyms
- Syngnathus blainvilleanus Eydoux & Gervais, 1837; Leptonotus blainvillianus (Eydoux & Gervais, 1837); Syngnathus acicularis Jenyns, 1842; Hemithylacus petersii Duméril, 1870; Acmonotus chilensis Philippi, 1896

Species of fish

The deep-bodied pipefish (Leptonotus blainvilleanus) is a species of marine fish belonging to the family Syngnathidae. They can be found in shallow estuaries and algal beds along the coast of South America from Ecuador to Argentina. Predators of this species include mackerel and the La Plata dolphin. Reproduction occurs through ovoviviparity: the eggs are carried in a pouch under the tail of the male until they hatch.

== Size ==
This species reaches a length of 25.0 cm (9.8 in).

== Etymology ==
The fish is named in honor of zoologist-anatomist Henri Marie Ducrotay de Blainville (1777-1850)
