= High-body pipefish =

Conservation status
- Least Concern (IUCN 3.1)

Scientific classification
- Kingdom: Animalia
- Phylum: Chordata
- Class: Actinopterygii
- Order: Syngnathiformes
- Family: Syngnathidae
- Genus: Leptonotus
- Species: L. elevatus

Binomial name
- Leptonotus elevatus (F. W. Hutton, 1872)

Synonyms
- Doryichthys elevatus Hutton, 1872

Species of fish

The high-body pipefish (Leptonotus elevatus) is a pipefish in the family Syngnathidae (seahorses and pipefishes). These demersal fish are widespread in New Zealand and the Auckland Islands. It can be found in the vicinity of piers and wharves down to offshore depths of 62–120 metres (203–394 ft). They have been recorded from substrates consisting of bryozoan and coarse shell. The juveniles have been collected in surface plankton tows. They are ovoviviparous and the male bears the eggs in a brood pouch which is on the ventral side of the tail. Gravid males have been recorded from standard lengths of 9.95 centimetres (3.92 in).
