= Stigmatopora nigra =

Wide-bodied pipefish

Conservation status
- Least Concern (IUCN 3.1)

Scientific classification
- Kingdom: Animalia
- Phylum: Chordata
- Class: Actinopterygii
- Order: Syngnathiformes
- Family: Syngnathidae
- Genus: Stigmatopora
- Species: S. nigra

Binomial name
- Stigmatopora nigra Kaup 1856

Species of fish

Stigmatopora nigra, also known as the wide-bodied pipefish, is a species of marine fish belonging to the family Syngnathidae. This species can be found in the shallow waters, bays, and estuaries of southern Australia from Shark Bay to Brisbane, Tasmania, and New Zealand. They often inhabit seagrass or algae beds in addition to bare sand. Their diet consists of small crustaceans such as copepods and amphipods. Adult brooding males have been measured at 6.5-7 centimeters. Reproduction occurs through ovoviviparity. in which the males brood up to 25 eggs in a pouch below the tail before giving live birth. Stigmatopora nigra can live to 150 days old and are able to reproduce throughout the year.
