= Henri Marie Ducrotay de Blainville =

French zoologist and anatomist (1777–1850)

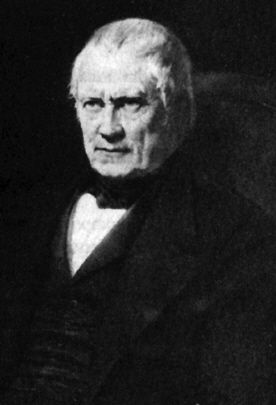
- Born: 12 September 1777; Arques-la-Bataille, France
- Died: 1 May 1850 (aged 72); Paris, France
- Known for: Taxonomic authority on zoological species
- Scientific career
- Fields: Anatomy; Herpetology; Zoology
- Workplaces: Collège de France; French Academy of Sciences
- Academic advisors: Georges Cuvier
- Notable students: Édouard-Gérard Balbiani
- Author abbrev. (zoology): Blainville

Henri Marie Ducrotay de Blainville (French: [ɑ̃ʁi maʁi dykʁɔtɛ də blɛ̃vil]; 12 September 1777 – 1 May 1850) was a French zoologist and anatomist.

== Life ==
Blainville was born at Arques, near Dieppe. As a young man, he went to Paris to study art, but ultimately devoted himself to natural history. He attracted the attention of Georges Cuvier, for whom he occasionally substituted as lecturer at the Collège de France and at the Athenaeum Club, London. In 1812, he was aided by Cuvier in acquiring the position of assistant professor of anatomy and zoology in the Faculty of Sciences at Paris. Eventually, relations between the two men soured, a situation that ended in open enmity.

In 1819, Blainville was elected a member of the American Philosophical Society in Philadelphia. In 1825, he was admitted a member of the French Academy of Sciences; and in 1830, he was appointed to succeed Jean-Baptiste Lamarck in the chair of natural history at the museum. Two years later, on the death of Cuvier, he obtained the chair of comparative anatomy, of which he proved himself a worthy successor to his former teacher. In 1837, he was elected a foreign member of the Royal Swedish Academy of Sciences. On May 1, 1850, he died from an attack of apoplexy in a railway carriage at the Embarcadère du Havre (current Gare Saint-Lazare) in Paris.

He was the taxonomic authority of numerous zoological species, extinct and extant; including the eponymous Blainville's beaked whale, Mesoplodon densirostris.

In the field of herpetology, he adopted Pierre André Latreille's proposal of separating Amphibia from Reptilia, and then (1816) developed a unique arrangement in regards to sub-groupings, using organs of generation as primary criteria. He described several new species of reptiles.

Blainville rejected evolution. He was a critic of Lamarck's evolutionary ideas but similar to Lamarck proposed a great chain of being.

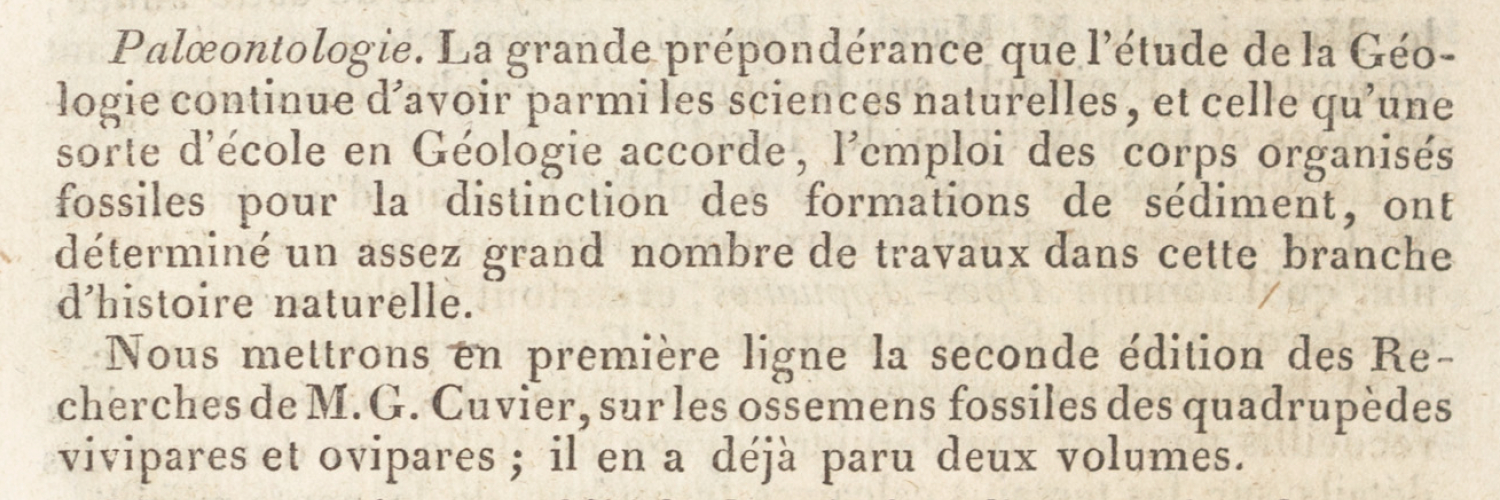
First mention of the word palæontologie, as coined in January 1822 by Blainville in his Journal de physique.

It was in 1822 that he coined the term paleontology.

== Taxa named in his honor ==
Blainville is commemorated in the scientific names of several species, such as the

- North American lizard Phrynosoma blainvillii.
- The fossil actinopterygian fish Aeduella blainvillei from the Permian period of Europe.
- The deep-bodied pipefish (Leptonotus blainvilleanus) (Eydoux & Gervais, 1837) is a species of marine fish belonging to the family Syngnathidae.
- The La Plata river dolphin Pontoporia blainvillei.

== Selected writings ==
- Sur les ichthyolites, ou, Les poissons fossiles (1818) - On "ichthyolites", or fossil fish.
- De l'organisation des animaux, ou Principes d'anatomie comparée (1822) - On the organization of animals, or principles of comparative anatomy.
- Manuel de malacologie et de conchyliologie (1825–1827) - Manual of malacology and conchology.
- Cours de physiologie générale et comparée (1829) - Course of general and comparative physiology.
- Manuel d'actinologie, ou de zoophytologie (1834) - Manual of actinology [the study of the chemical effects of visible and ultraviolet light] or zoophytology.
- Ostéographie ou description iconographique comparée du squelette et du système dentaire des mammifères récents et fossiles (1839–64) - Osteography or comparative iconographical descriptions of the skeleton and teeth of living and fossil mammals.

== Taxon described by him ==
- See Category:Taxa named by Henri Marie Ducrotay de Blainville
