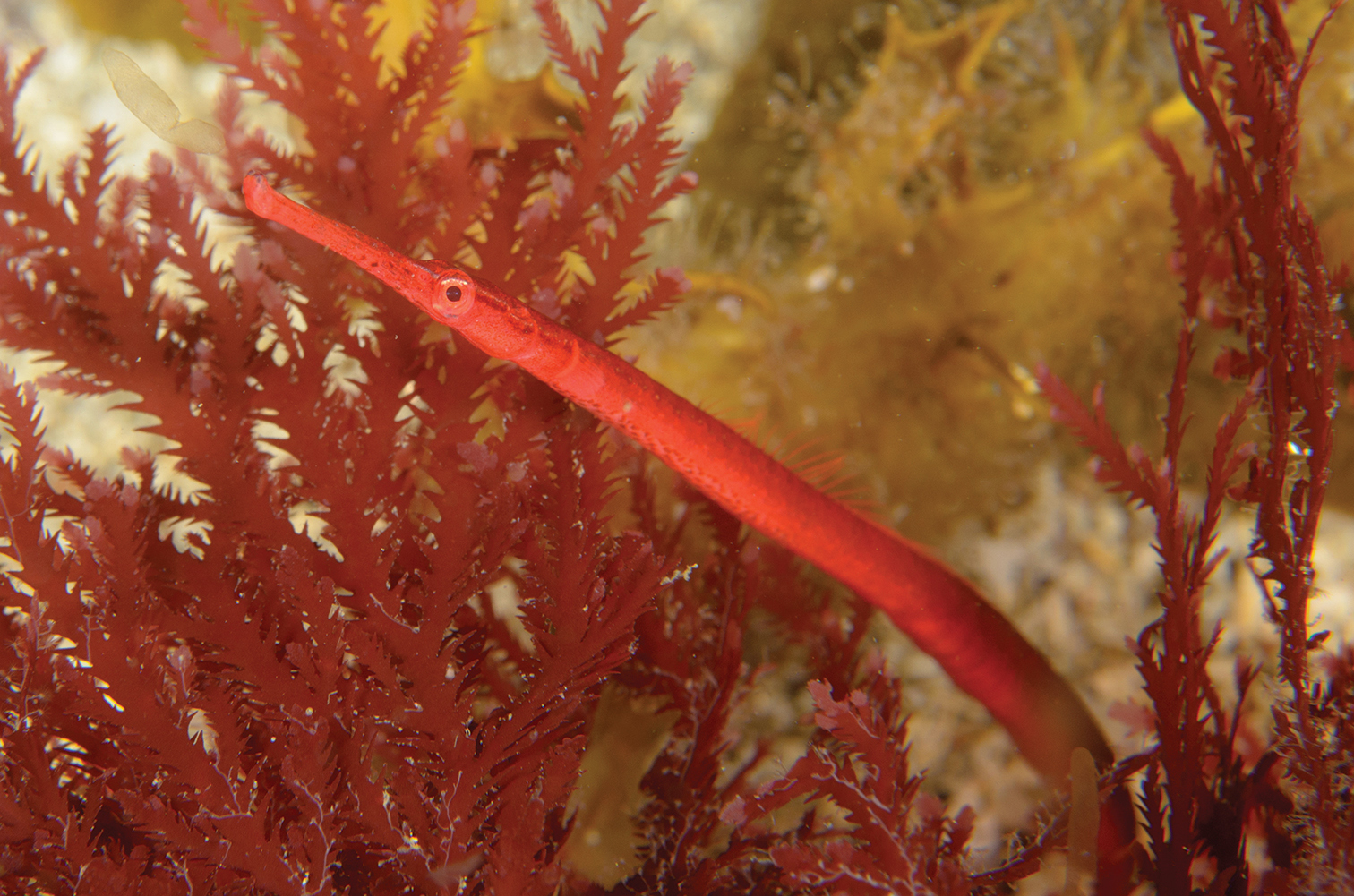

Scientific classification
- Domain: Eukaryota
- Kingdom: Animalia
- Phylum: Chordata
- Class: Actinopterygii
- Order: Syngnathiformes
- Family: Syngnathidae
- Genus: Stigmatopora
- Species: S. harastii

Binomial name
- Stigmatopora harastii Short & Trevor-Jones, 2020

= Stigmatopora harastii =

Species of fish

Stigmatopora harastii, the red wide-bodied pipefish, is a species of ray-finned fish from the family of pipefish and seahorses (Syngnathidae).

== Etymology ==
This species is named after David Harasti, one of the first to recognize S. harastii as being a new species, for recognition of his efforts towards conservation of Syngnathidae in Australia, and for being an aficionado extraordinaire of his beloved genus Stigmatopora. Harasti's pipefish and red wide-bodied pipefish were proposed as the common names for S. harastii.

== Description ==
Stigmatopora harastii has a median ridge that is distinct, low and present on dorsum of head and first trunk ring starting from the posterior third of the frontal, over the supraoccipital, to the anterior and posterior nuchal plates. Its opercular ridge is prominent, complete, not angled dorsal. Its lateromedial ridge, distinct, low, present between opercle and pectoral fin base. Its dorsal-fin origin on 6th–7th trunk rings, subdorsal rings 19–20 (12 trunk rings + 7 or 8 tail rings); lateral trunk ridge ends on first tail ring. It has a red background colour on the dorsum of snout with large, irregular pale white spots. The sides of head and anterior trunk rings with large, irregular pale white spots or with diffuse pale white stripe. The venter of first trunk ring with distinct red elongated spots in longitudinal row, almost forming a stripe, on midline present in male. The venter of anterior trunk rings pale red with a large cluster of distinct red spots extending posteriad from second trunk ring in male, few scattered small red spots in females.

== Distribution and habitat ==
Stigmatopora harastii is currently known to occur in central New South Wales, Australia, from only three localities, including Botany Bay, Shellharbour, and Jervis BBa.

Stigmatopora harastii inhabits semi-exposed bay entrances and ocean embayments in which the underwater terrain is characterised by sandy areas interspersed with boulders and hard flat reefs. Individuals and pairs of S. harastii were observed in close association with a species of finger sponge appearing to a member of the family Callyspongiidae and several different species of red algae appearing to be of the family Gracilariaceae in the genera Crassiphycus and Gracilaria.
