= Two Oceans Aquarium =

Aquarium in Cape Town, South Africa

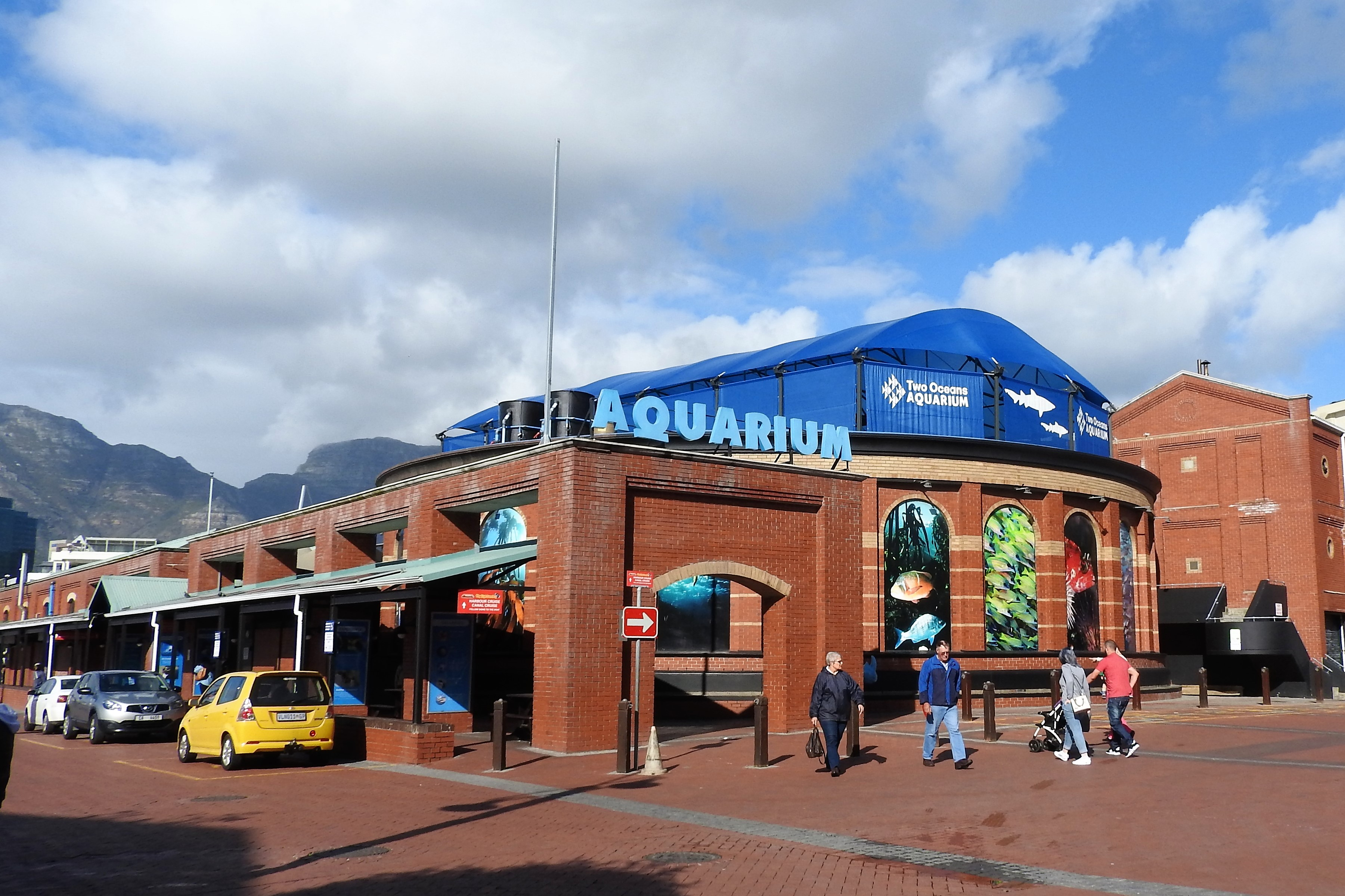
- Interactive map of Two Oceans Aquarium
- 33°54′29″S 18°25′3″E
- Date opened: 13 November 1995; 30 years ago
- Location: Cape Town, South Africa
- No. of animals: 8,000
- No. of species: over 300
- Volume of largest tank: 2,000,000 L (440,000 imp gal; 530,000 US gal)
- Annual visitors: 500,000
- Owner: V&A Waterfront Holdings (Pty) Limited
- Public transit: By bus: MyCiTi 104
- Website: www.aquarium.co.za

The Two Oceans Aquarium is an aquarium located at the Victoria & Alfred Waterfront in Cape Town, Western Cape, South Africa. The aquarium was opened on the 13 November 1995 and comprises several exhibition galleries with large viewing windows: The aquarium is named for its location, where the Indian and Atlantic Ocean meet.

== Exhibits ==
- Diversity Gallery - This gallery showcases marine life of South Africa's two oceans, and the major Benguela and Agulhas Currents that dominate its shores. Notable species include Knysna seahorses, moray eels, anemonefish, cryptic klipfish, sea stars, compass jellyfish, shysharks and temporary exhibitions of foreign species.
- I&J Children's Play Centre—There are various activities to keep the young visitors entertained, such as puppet shows and arts and crafts.
- Save Our Seas Foundation Shark Exhibit - This exhibit holds 2 million litres of seawater. Ragged-tooth sharks, as well as various other fishes, are found in the exhibit.
- I&J Ocean Exhibit - This exhibit holds 1.6 million litres of seawater. Various fish, rays, and turtles can be seen in this exhibit.
- Kelp Forest Exhibit - One of the aquarium's biggest attractions, this underwater forest is home to shoals of coastal fishes, such as white musselcrackers, steenbras and spotted gully sharks, and living specimens of South Africa's kelp species, sea bamboo, split-fan kelp and bladder kelp. The northern rockhopper penguin also uses this exhibit for their exercise.
- Penguin Exhibit - African black-footed penguins, northern rockhopper penguins, western leopard toads and African clawed frogs. A river course divided into three sections (upper, middle, and lower) with examples of native and invasive freshwater fishes is also present

== Gallery ==
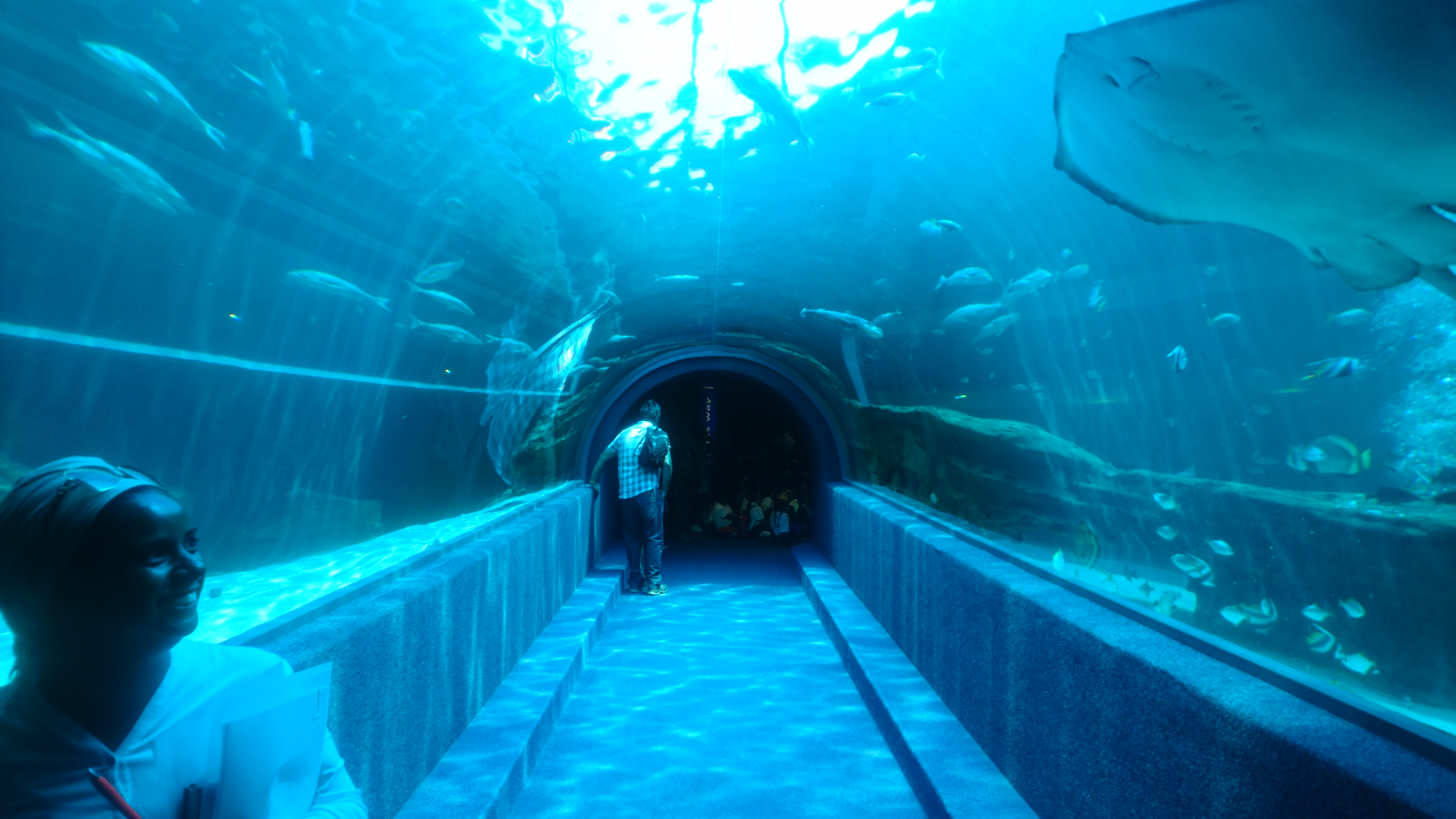
The tunnel of the I&J Ocean Exhibit

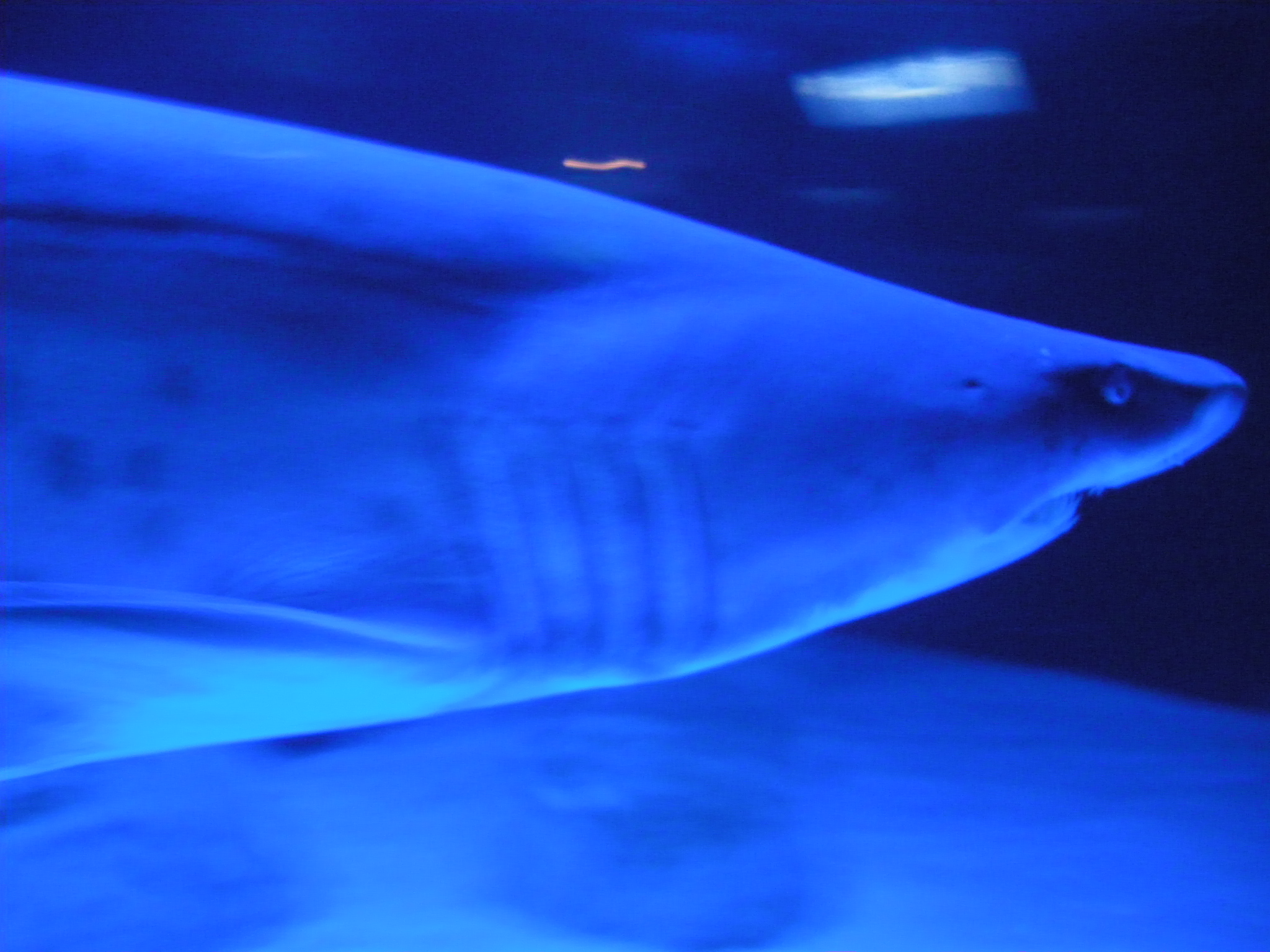

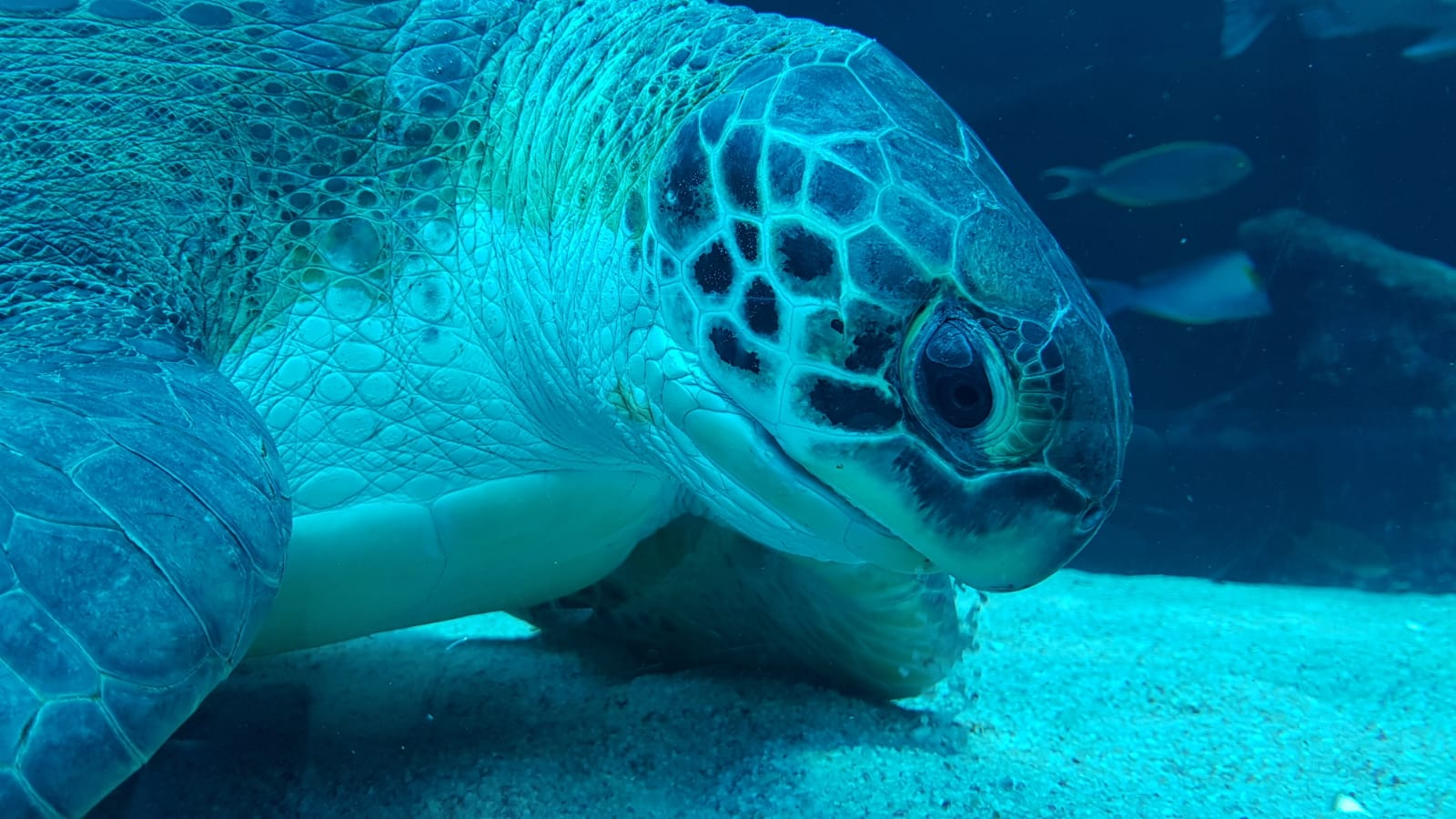
Bob, a green sea turtle at the aquarium

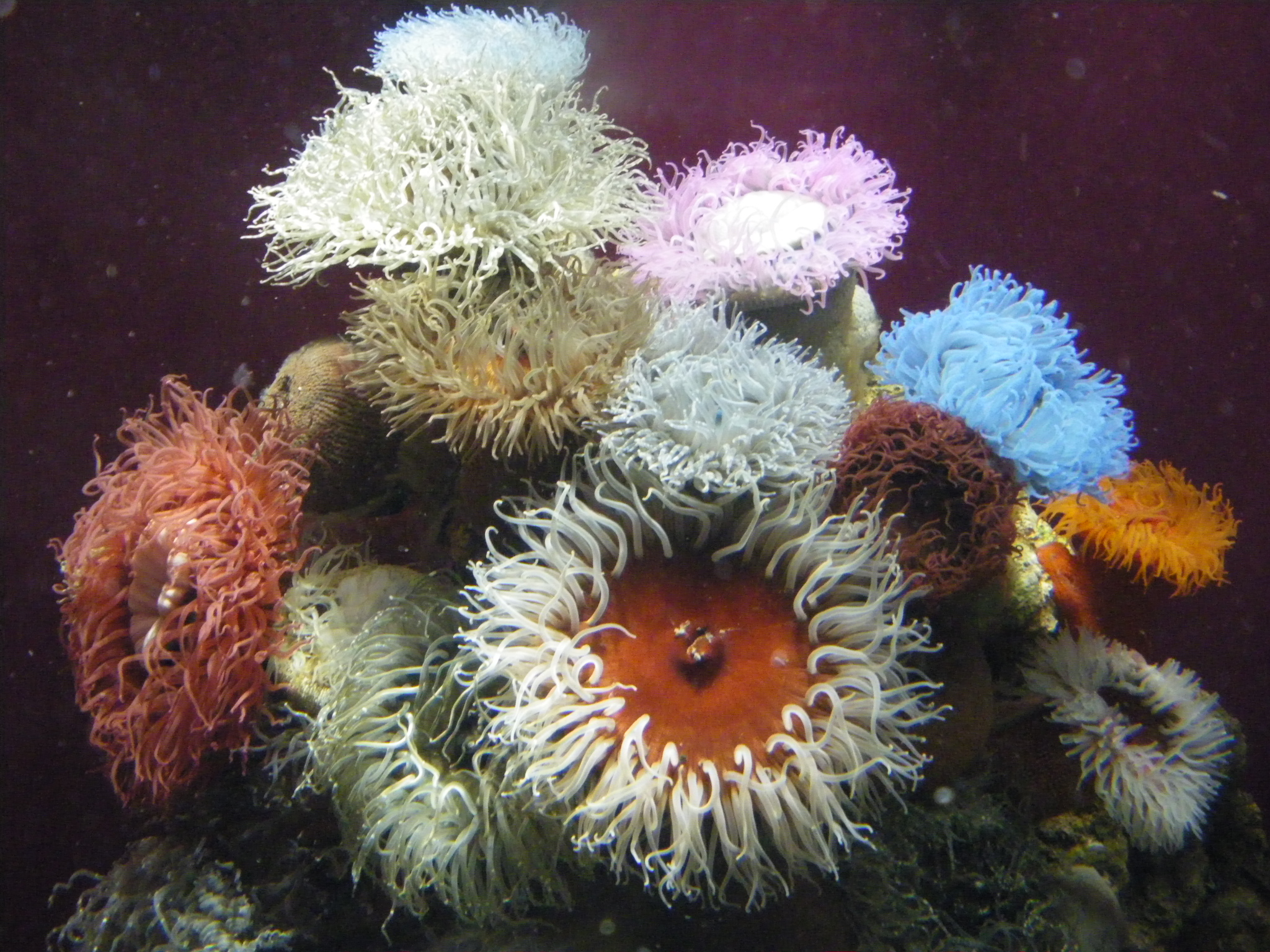

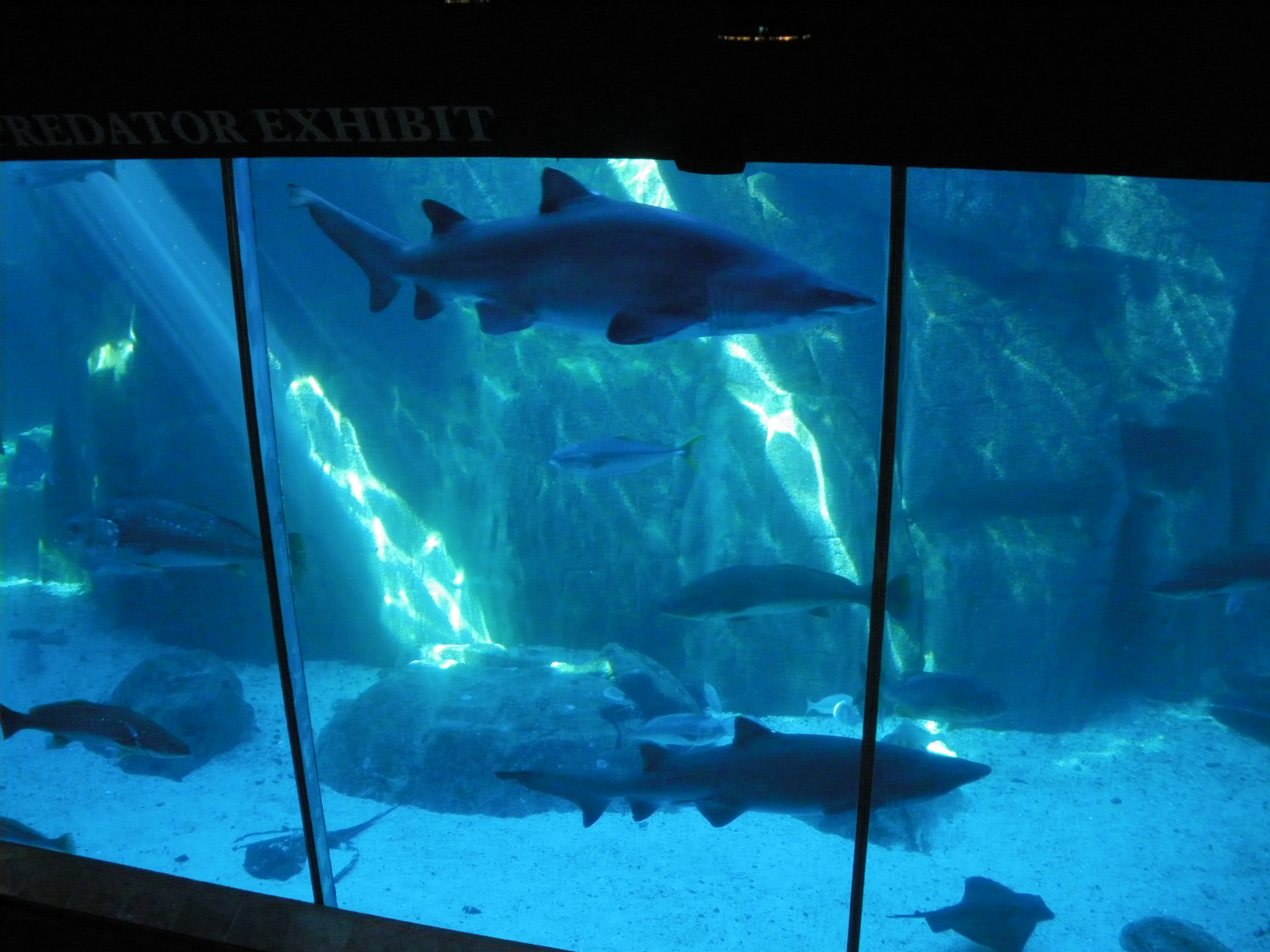

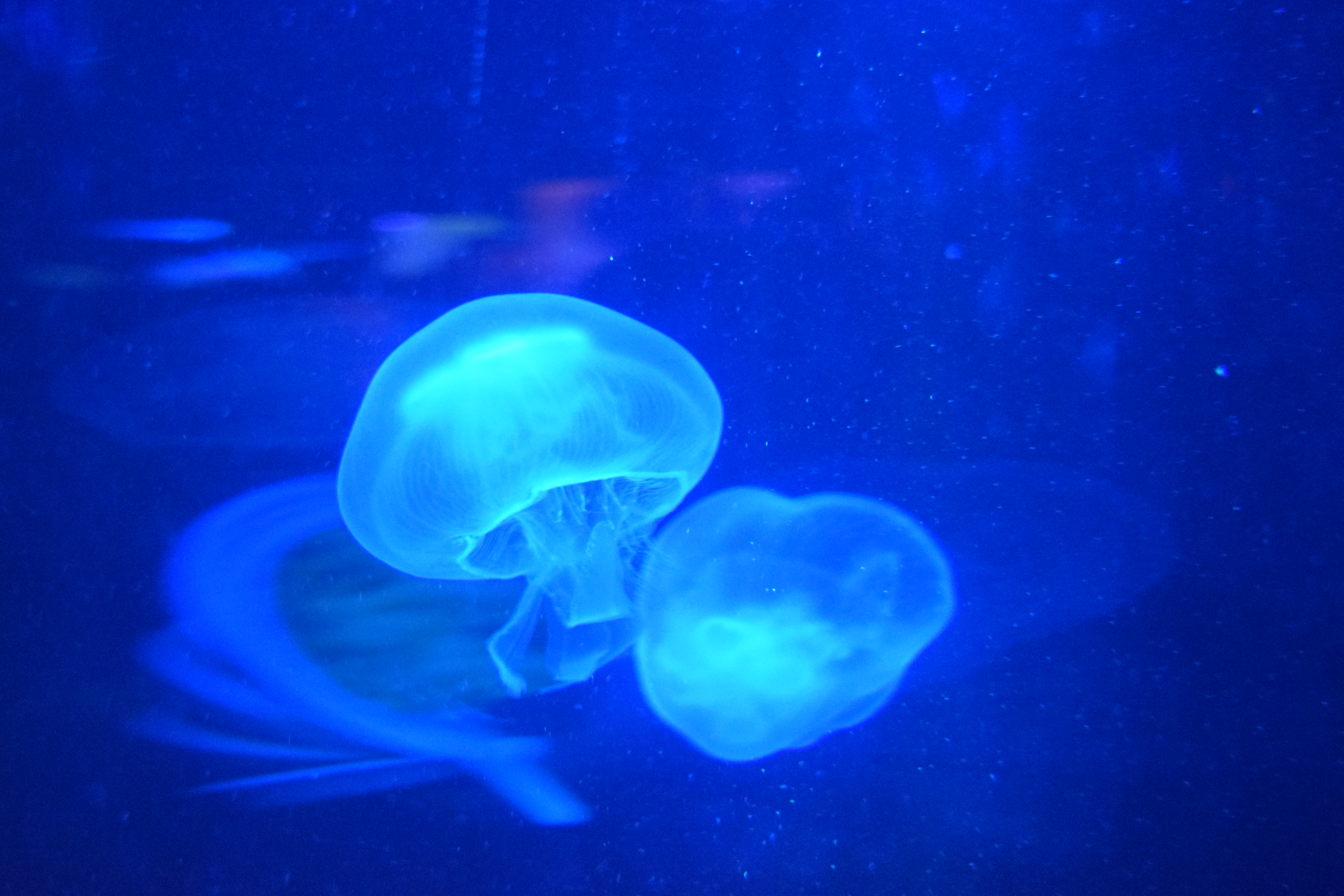

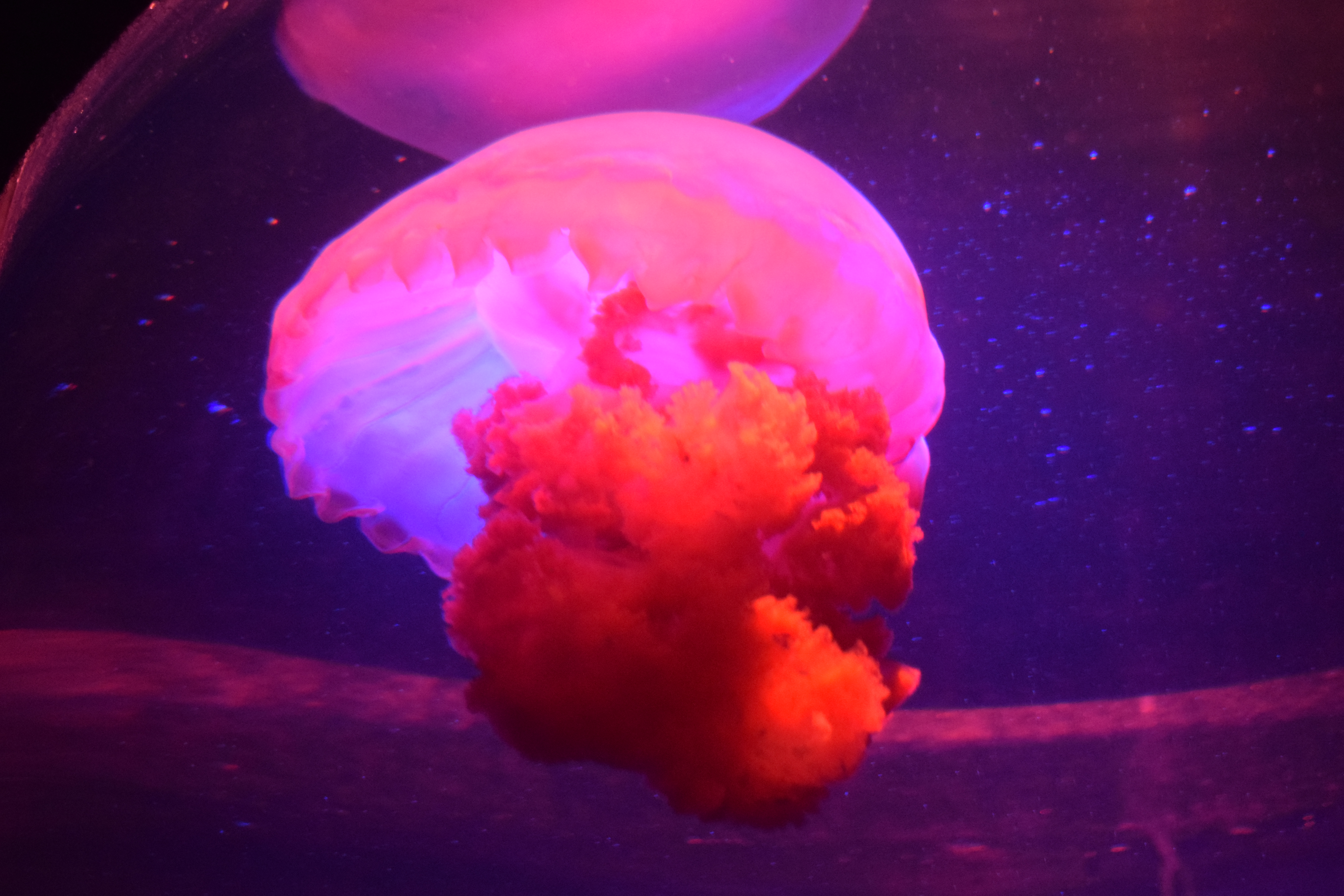

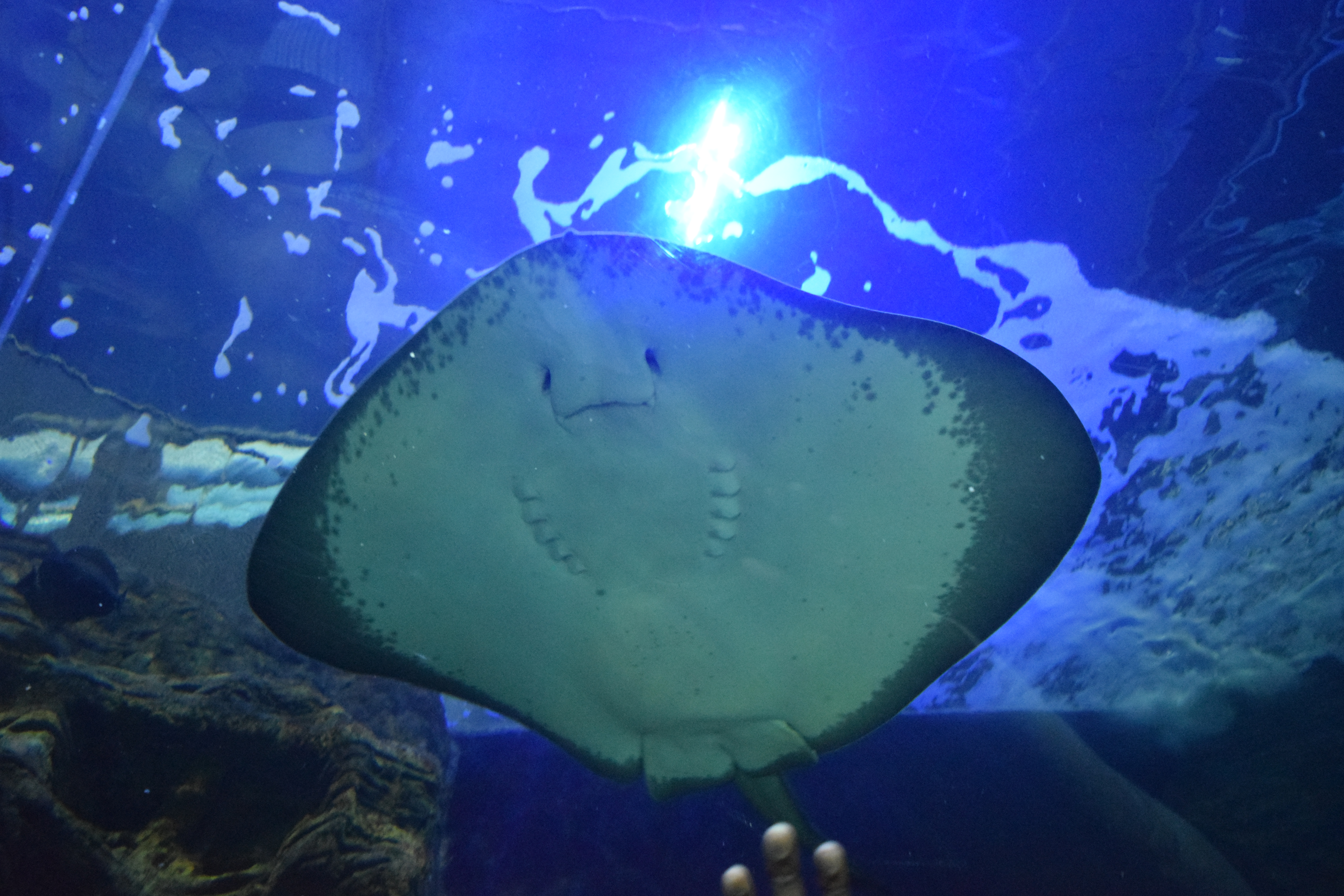

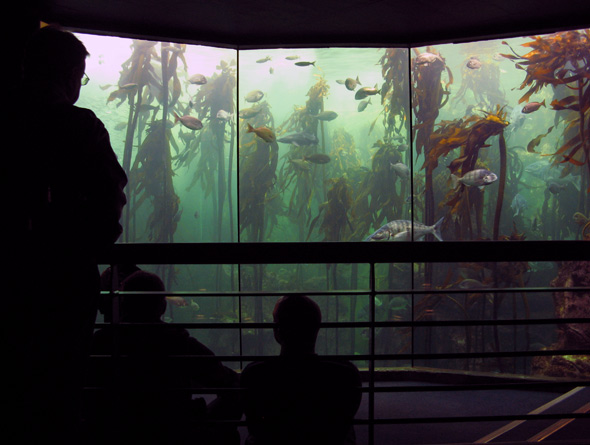
The main kelp forest tank in Two Oceans Aquarium

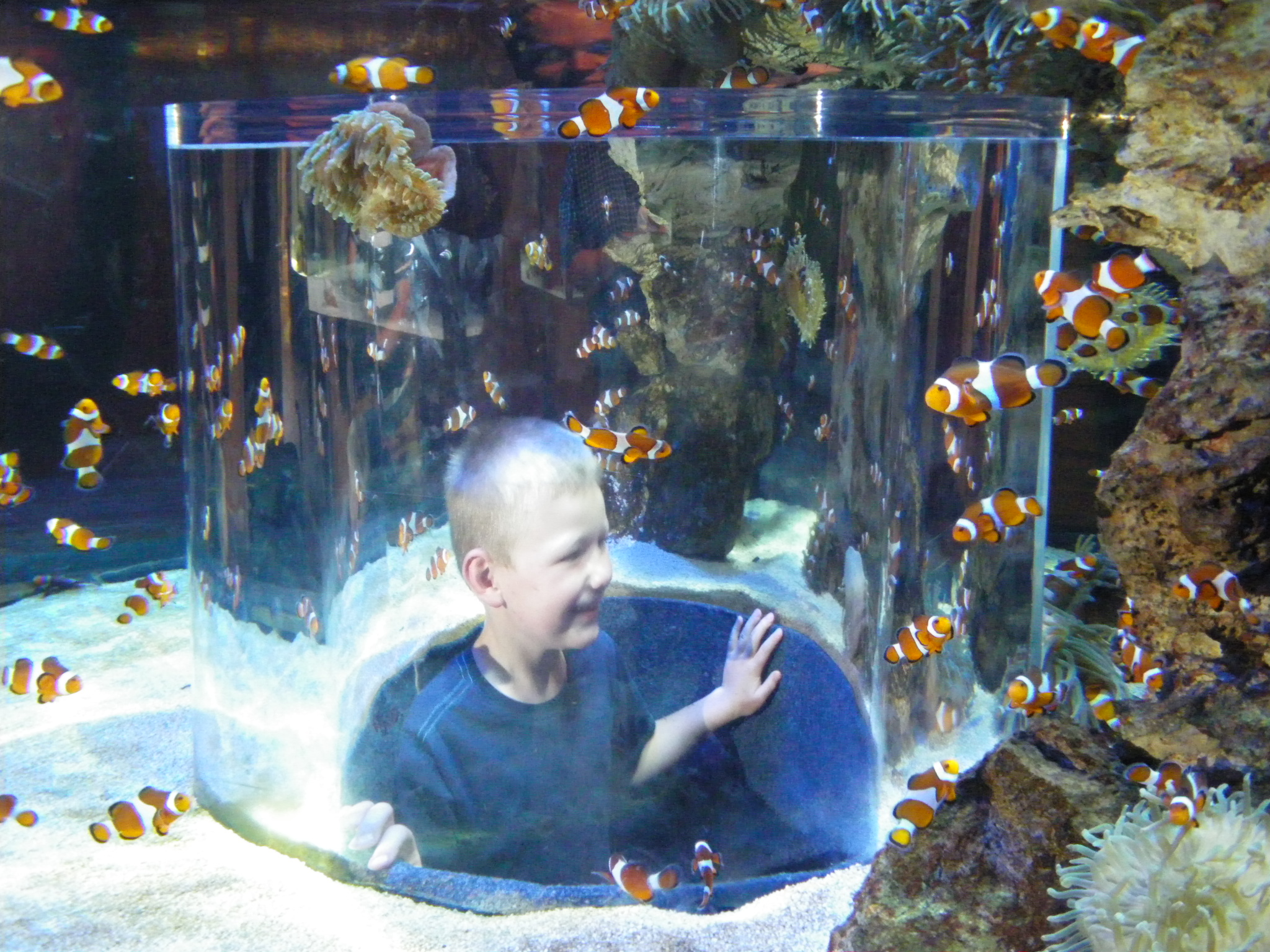
Anemonefish in Two Oceans Aquarium
