= Kasouga River =

Kasouga river
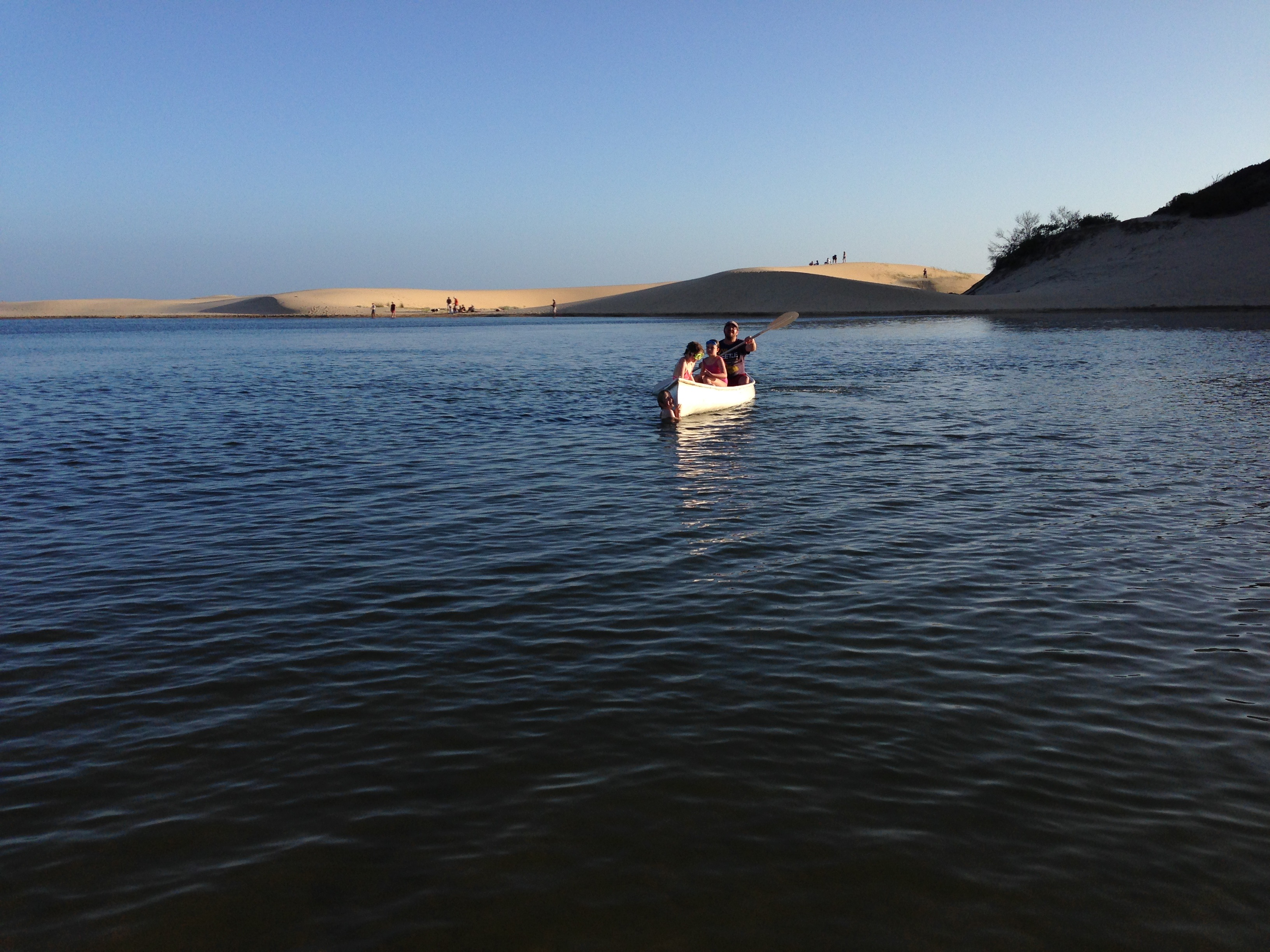
- Paddling on the Kasouga river

- Location within South Africa
- Etymology: The place of the leopard

Location
- Country: South Africa
- Province: Eastern Cape
- District: Sarah Baartman District
- Municipality: Ndlambe Municipality

Physical characteristics
- Source
  - coordinates: 33.60484°S 26.74999°E
- Mouth
  - coordinates: 33.65404°S 26.73593°E

The Kasouga River is a blind river located between Kenton-on-Sea and Port Alfred in the Eastern Cape Province, South Africa, 900 kilometres (560 mi) south of Pretoria. The Kasouga estuary has mudflats, reeds and grasses, and occasionally the lagoon is breached and the river flows directly into the Indian Ocean. Kasouga is also an old holiday villiage that means “place of the leopard” in the Khoe-Khoe language.
