= Snout moth =

Snout moth may refer to:

- Pyraloidea, a moth superfamily containing about 16,000 described species
- Hypena proboscidalis, a moth species commonly referred to as the snout in the superfamily Noctuoidea
