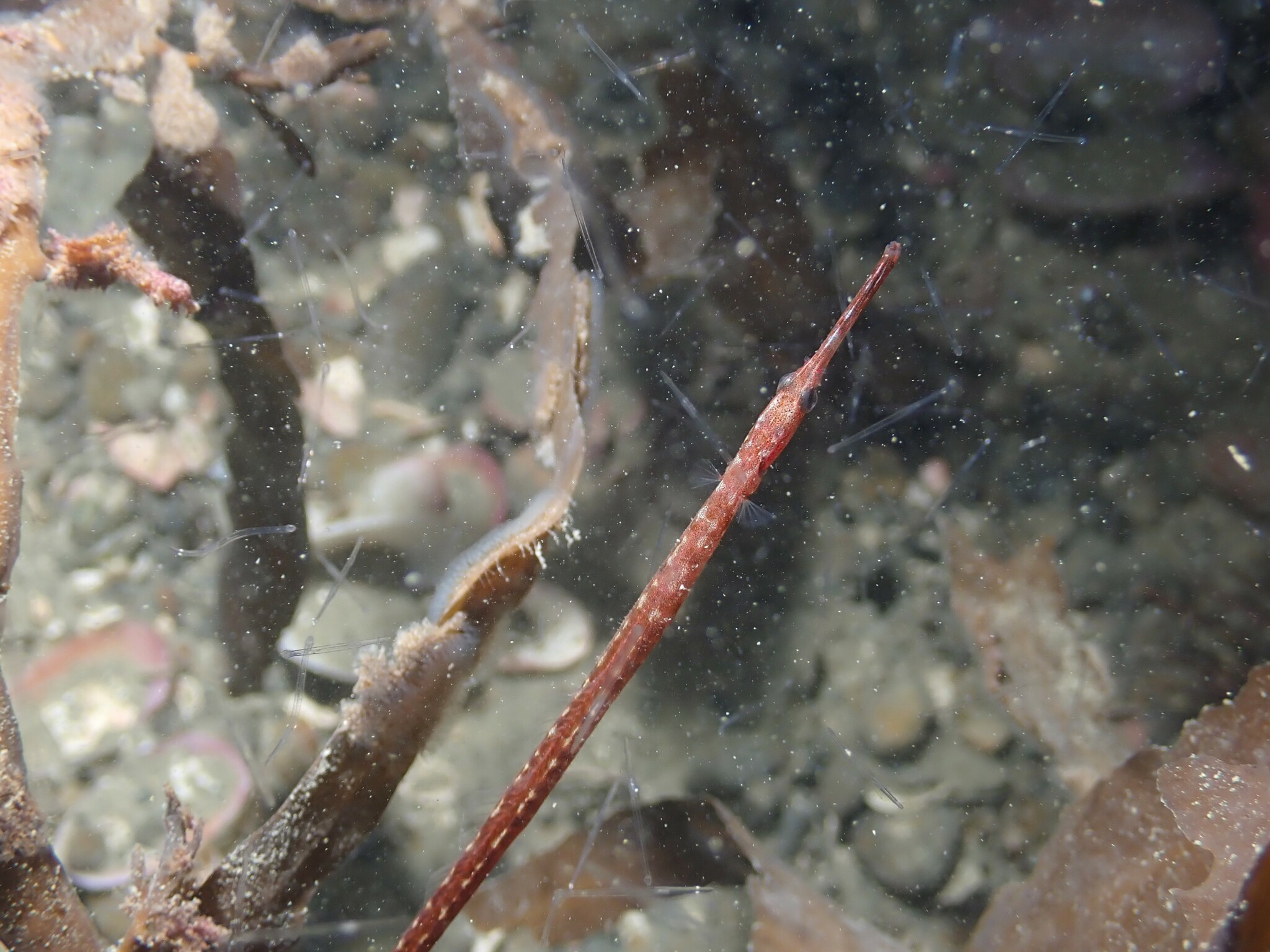
- Stigmatopora macropterygia seen in Wellington Harbour, New Zealand

Conservation status
- Least Concern (IUCN 3.1)

Scientific classification
- Kingdom: Animalia
- Phylum: Chordata
- Class: Actinopterygii
- Division: Teleostei
- Order: Syngnathiformes
- Family: Syngnathidae
- Genus: Stigmatopora
- Species: S. macropterygia

Binomial name
- Stigmatopora macropterygia A. H. A. Duméril, 1870

Synonyms
- Stigmatopora longirostris Hutton, 1872

= Long-snouted pipefish =

Species of fish

The long-snouted pipefish (Stigmatopora macropterygia) is a pipefish of the family Syngnathidae

== Physical description ==
Its length is up to 45 centimetres (18 in). It is eel-like in appearance.

== Breeding ==
The male is ovoviviparous and carries the eggs in a brood pouch which is found under the tail. Males probably brood when about 24-25 cm in length.

== Distribution ==
It is found around New Zealand including the Auckland Islands, generally at depths of less than 7.5 m. It can be found in intertidal algal beds, and also on wharves and pilings.

== Conservation status ==
In 2016 its status in The IUCN Red List of Threatened Species was listed as Least Concern.

== See also ==
- Longsnout pipefish, Leptonotus norae
