= Zostera capensis =

Southern African eelgrass

Conservation status
- Vulnerable (IUCN 3.1)

Scientific classification
- Kingdom: Plantae
- Clade: Tracheophytes
- Clade: Angiosperms
- Clade: Monocots
- Order: Alismatales
- Family: Zosteraceae
- Genus: Zostera
- Species: Z. capensis

Binomial name
- Zostera capensis Setch.

Synonyms
- Nanozostera capensis (Setch.) Toml. & Posl.

Species of aquatic plant

Zostera capensis is a species of dwarf eelgrass growing along the shores of the Indian and Atlantic oceans on the African coast. Its range extends from southern Kenya, through Tanzania, Mozambique, Madagascar, and South Africa up to Angola . This species is the dominant seagrass species in South Africa, occurring as fragmented populations along the coast and occupying subtidal and intertidal habitats in shallow bays, estuaries and lagoons. The two largest meadows in South Africa are present in the Knysna lagoon and Berg river estuary. When last mapped in 2007, Zostera capensis cover in the Berg river estuary was estimated at 206 hectares, while in 2019 the Knysna lagoon was mapped at 316 hectares. Further north in its distribution, Maputo bay in Mozambique is an important habitat for this species, containing approximately 4016 hectares of mixed Zostera capensis and Halodule wrightii on muddy flats. Over its total distribution, this species is estimated to occupy less than 2000 km².

== Threats ==
Zostera capensis can grow fast, but it is a slow colonizer, with numerous anthropogenic threats. Populations of Zostera capensis are threatened by nutrient enrichment (i.e., eutrophication) which affect their physiological performances by increasing epiphytic fouling/loading; these epiphytic fouling are strongly associated with lower shoot survival. In addition, flooding of estuarine areas, pollution and sedimentation also present major threats to Z. capensis; bioturbation also poses a negative impact on populations with lower biomass and highly fragmented patches. In Mozambique, shellfish harvesting (i.e., gleaning) has been reported as one of the major threats to Z. capensis. Nonetheless, Z. capensis remains a poorly protected yet severely fragmented keystone species
