= Jacques Kets =

Belgian naturalist and zoo director (1785–1865)

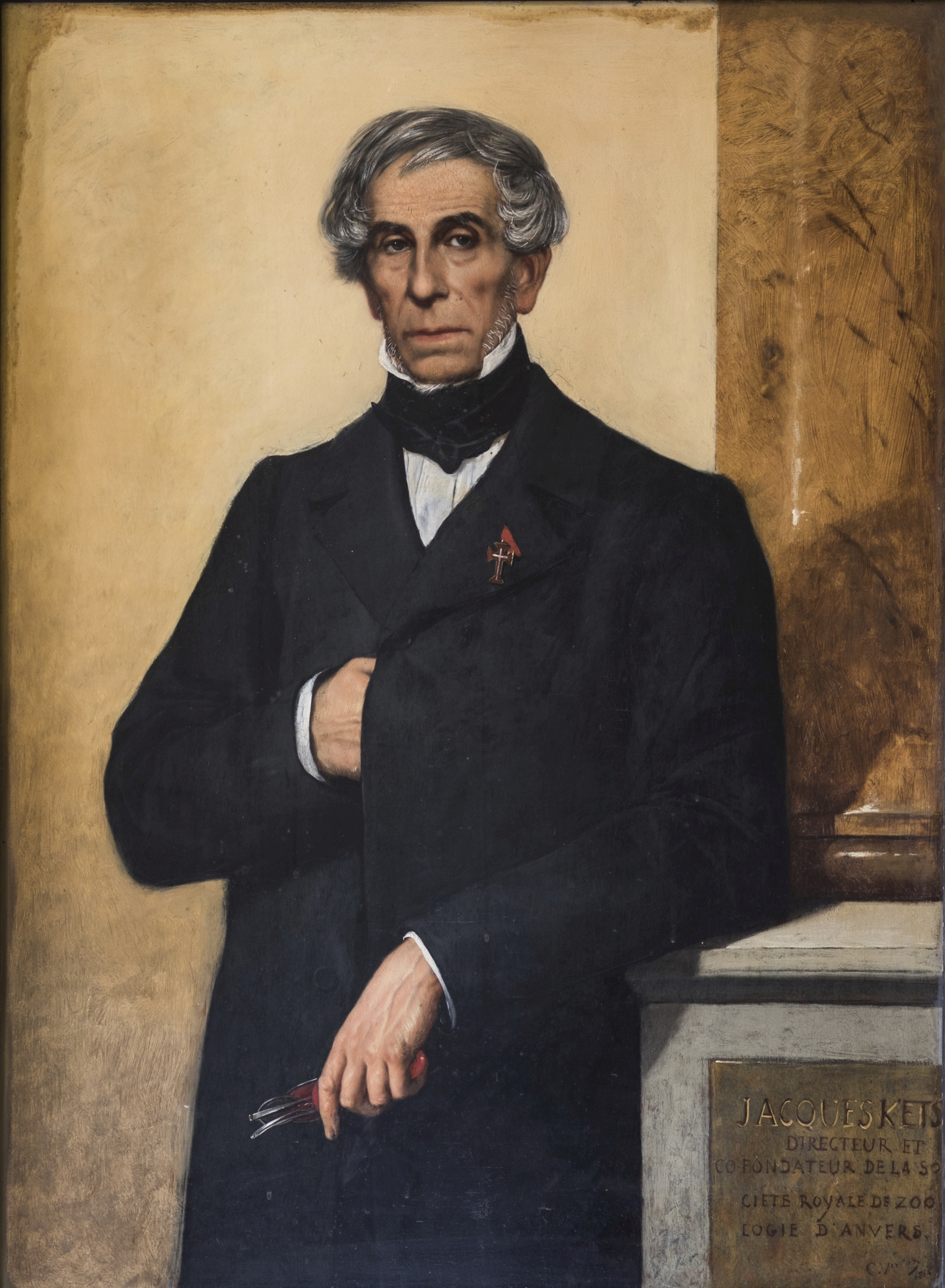
Portrait of Kets by Karel Verlat

Jacques François Kets (10 November 1785 – 1 February 1865) was a Belgian taxidermist and naturalist who served as the founding director of Antwerp zoo, the first modern zoo in Europe. He served as its director until his death.

== Life and work ==
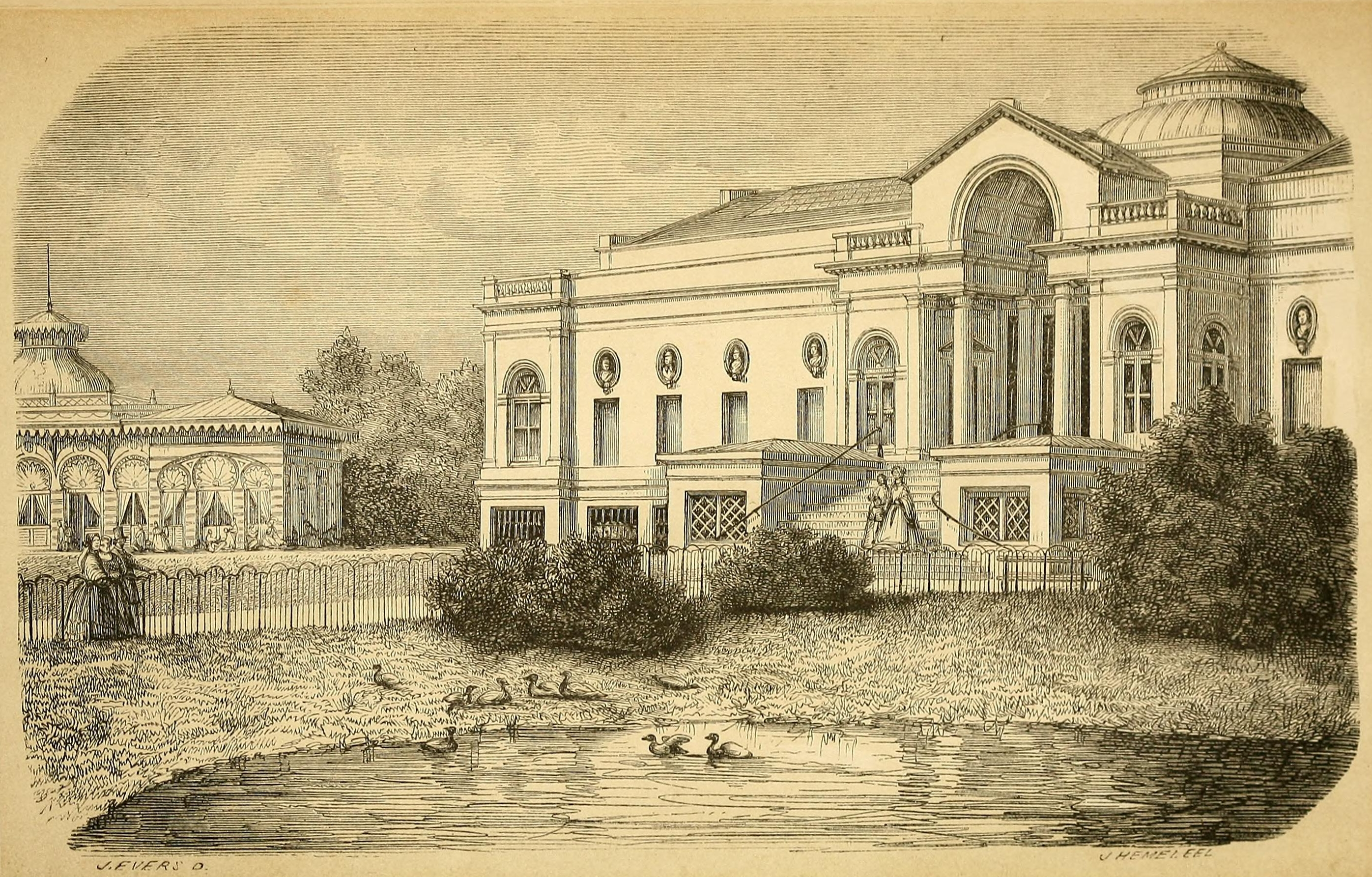
The museum at the zoo in 1861

Kets was born in Antwerp, son of fabric dyer Jacques and Johanna-Katherina van Breda. He became interested in natural history from an early age, joining his father on hunts, and learned taxidermy. He made trips around Europe and amassed a large cabinet of natural history objects and books. He studied botany and zoology and in 1815 he was hired to prepare a taxidermic mount of the horse Wexy of William of Orange that was killed in the Battle of Waterloo in 1815. He opened out his cabinet of curiosity to the public around 1828 on the Kloosterstraat in Antwerp. His cabinet of stuffed birds (nearly 240 species) was a major attraction but he also had minerals, Roman artefacts and other objects of curiosity. In July 1841 a meeting of the zoologists took place and the Antwerp society for zoology was formed with 100000 Belgian francs raised for the establishment of a zoo. Kets was appointed as director for life and he began to put together a collection of live animals, making Antwerp zoo the first in Europe. He also moved his personal collections into a museum within the premises. He also was interested in ethnology. When a ship returned from Brazil, the captain brought back not only birds and animals but also a ten-year old slave boy who was baptized as Jozef Möller who was put under the care of Kets. He was better known as Jefke and was involved in taking care of the zoo birds and animals. He came to be known as "Jefke van de Zoölogie" and married a maid Joanna Catherina Claes in 1860. Jefke continued to work at the zoo after the death of Kets when his nephew Jacques Vekemans took over as director.

An award was instituted in the memory of Kets in 1953 by the Royal Zoological Society of Antwerp. It is awarded to the best master's thesis in zoology in Belgium.

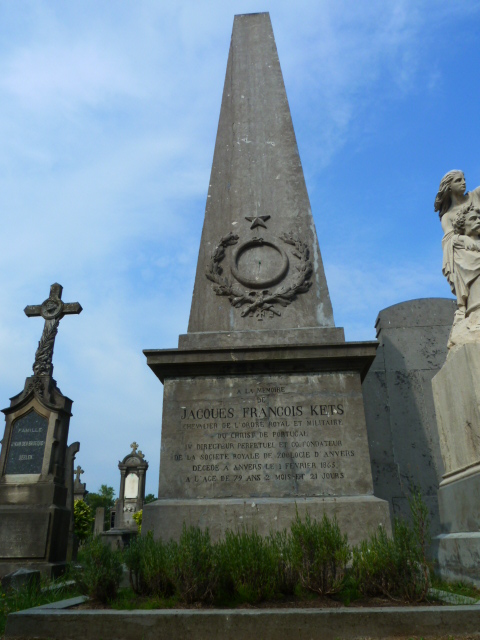
Grave of Kets
