= Planckendael =

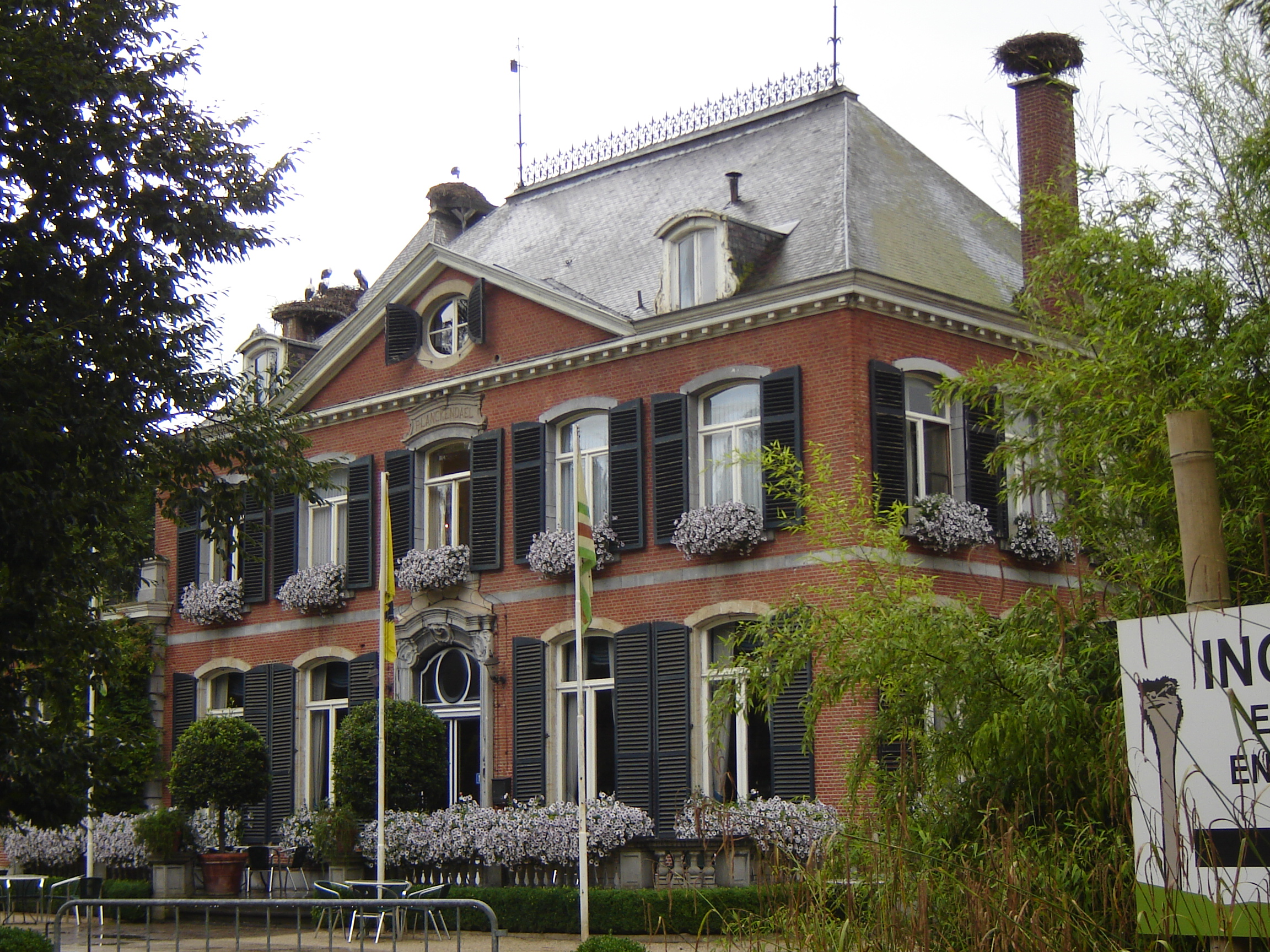
- Planckendael castle
- Interactive map of Planckendael
- 51.001389°N 4.516389°E
- Date opened: 1956
- Location: Mechelen, Belgium
- Memberships: EAZA
- Website: www.planckendael.be

Planckendael is a zoo, located on the grounds of Planckendael castle in the village district of Muizen, in Mechelen, Belgium. In 1956 the Royal Zoological Society of Antwerp (KMDA) bought the Planckendael estate in order to acquire a larger space for animals than what they owned: the city zoo in Antwerp. Planckendael hosts exotic animals like rhinos, bison and various antelope species.

Planckendael also has extensive leisure facilities: For children there is a large separate play area.

== Gallery ==
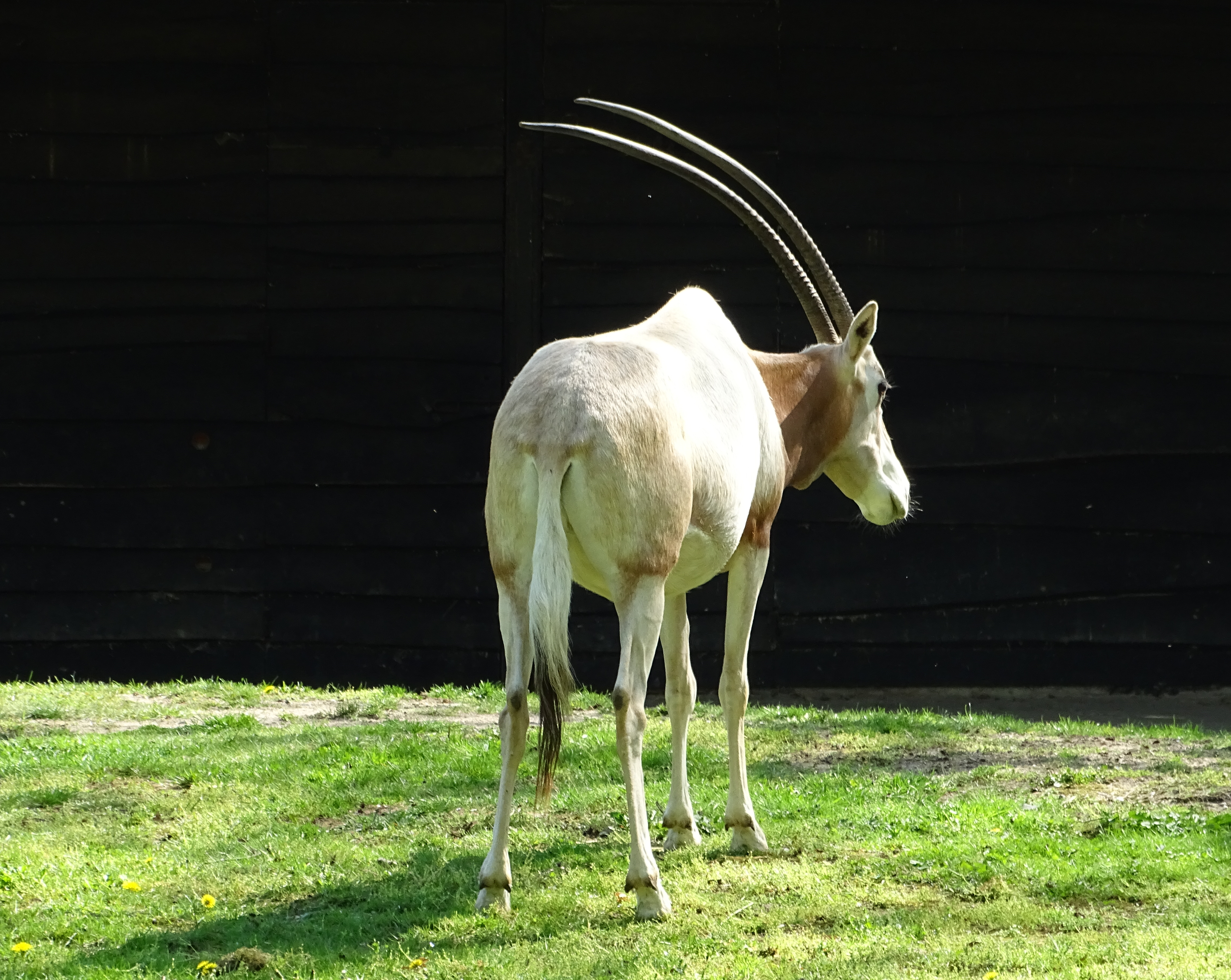
Scimitar oryx

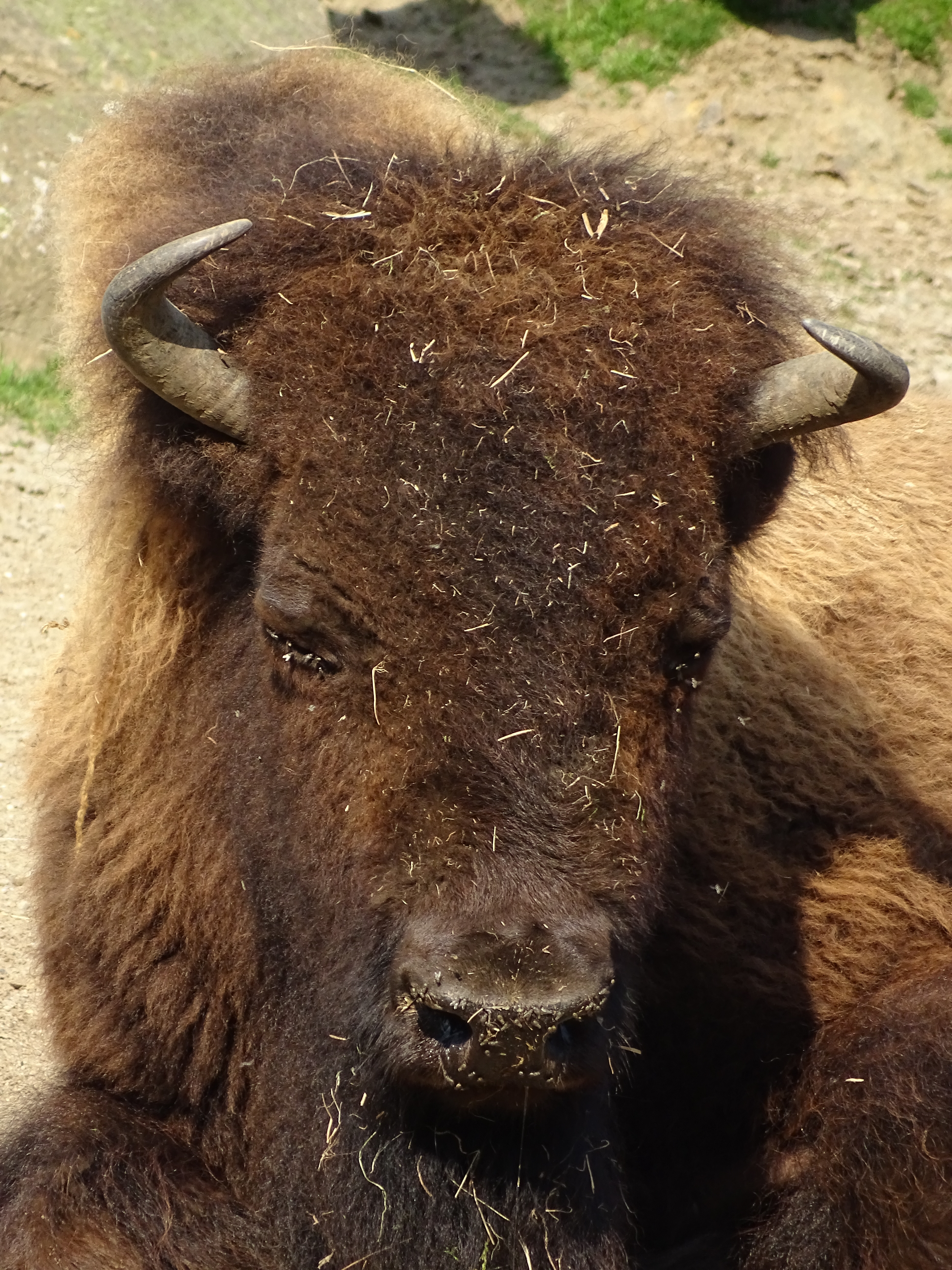
American bison

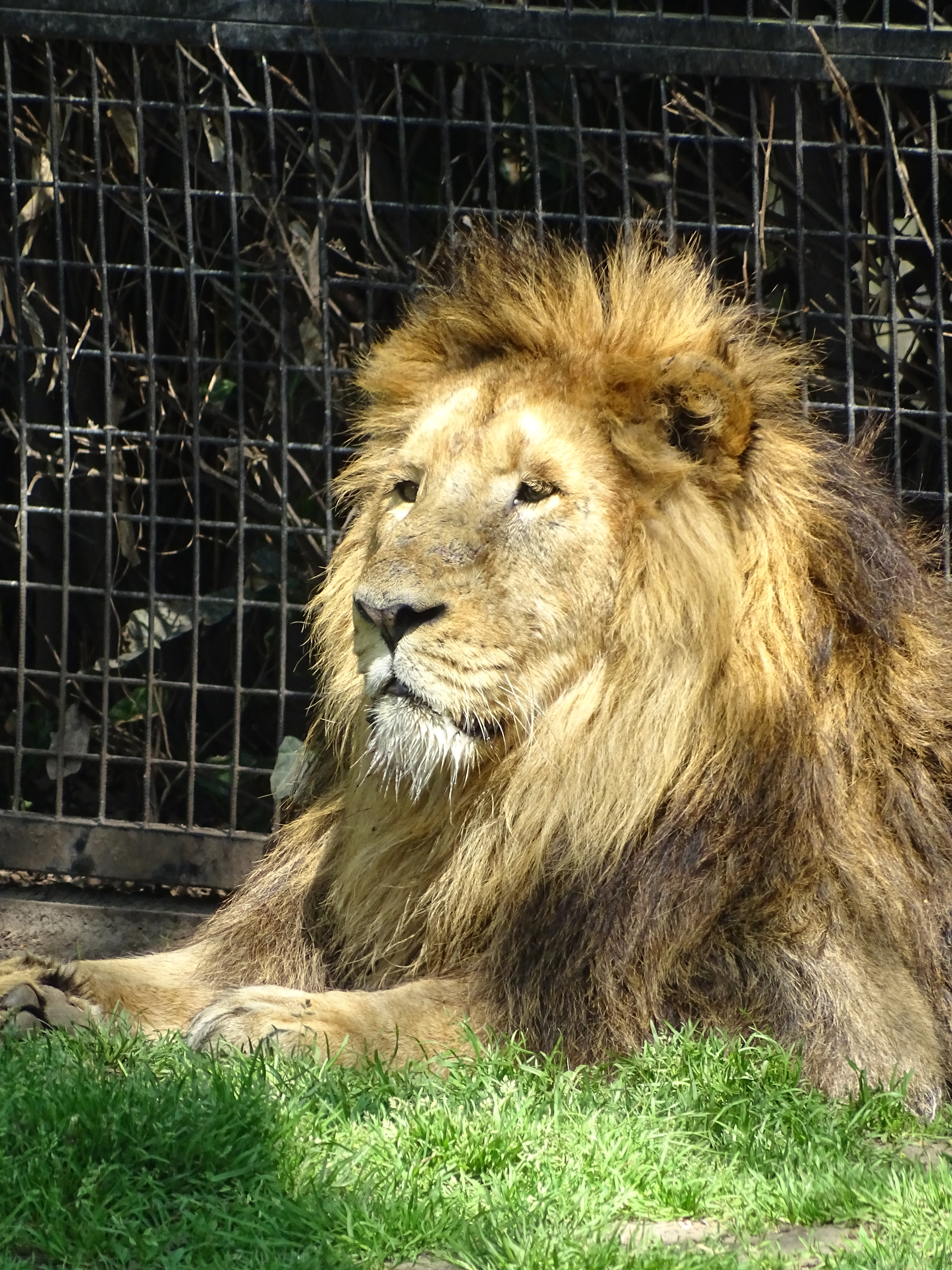
Asiatic lion

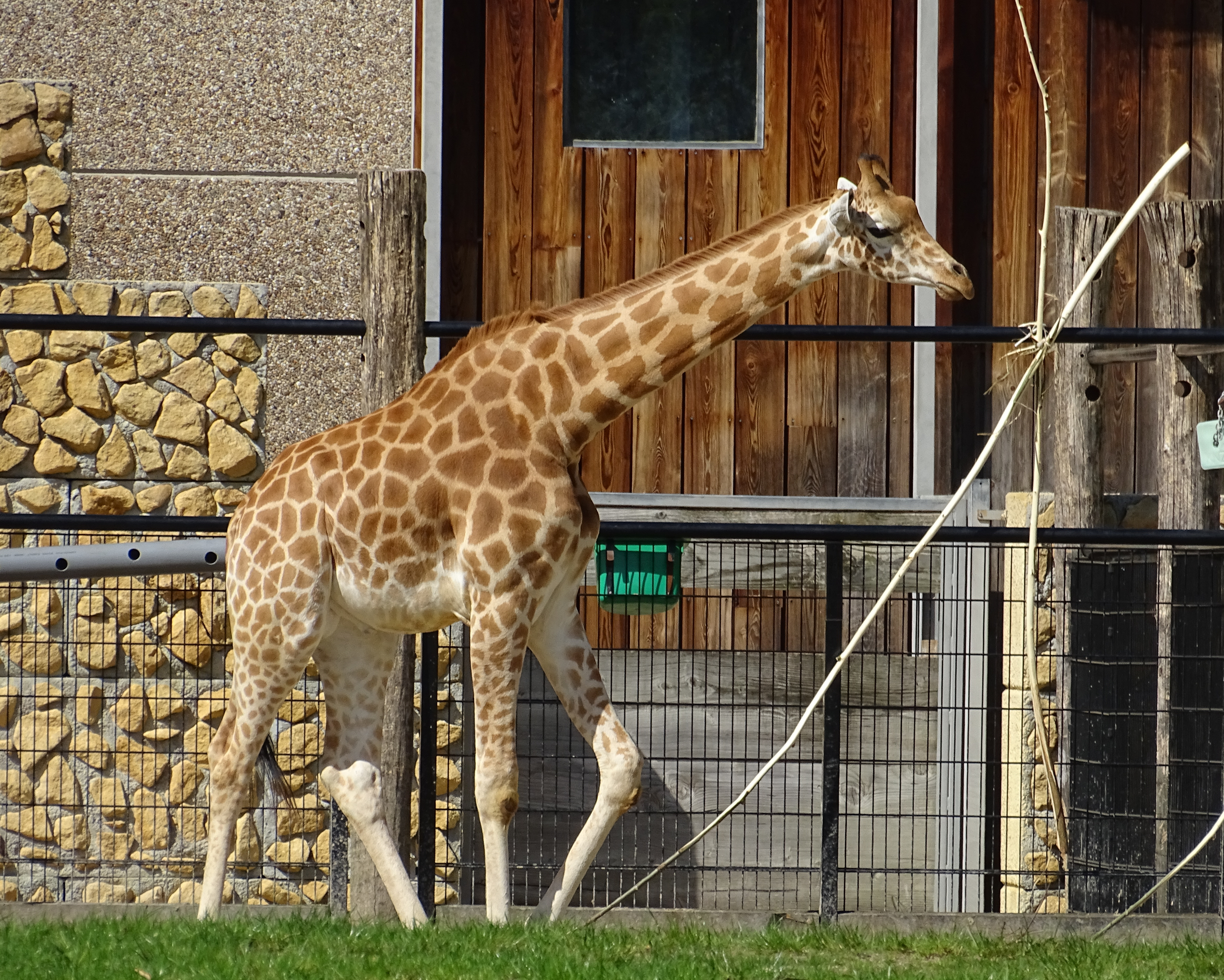
Giraffe

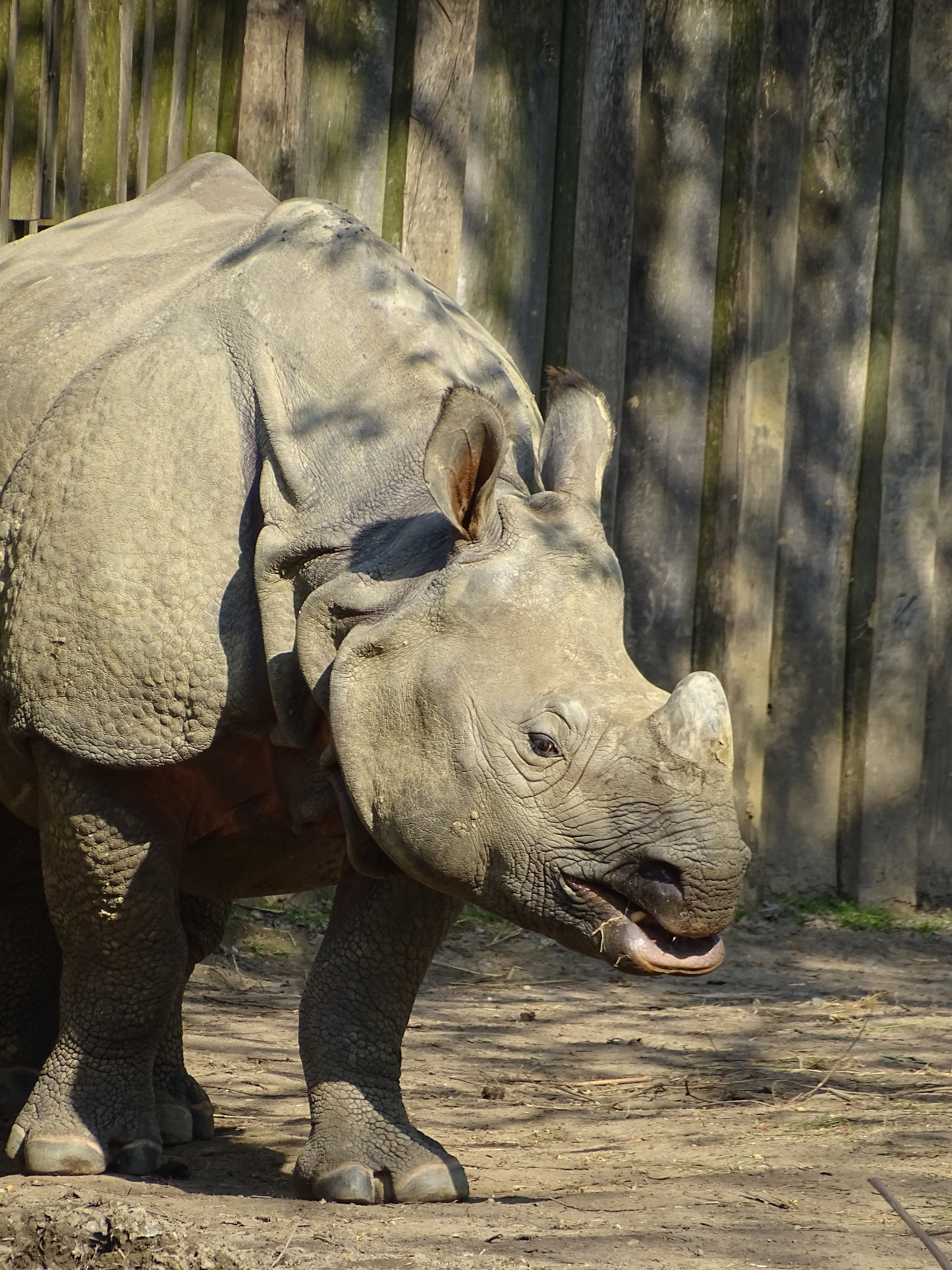
Indian rhinoceros

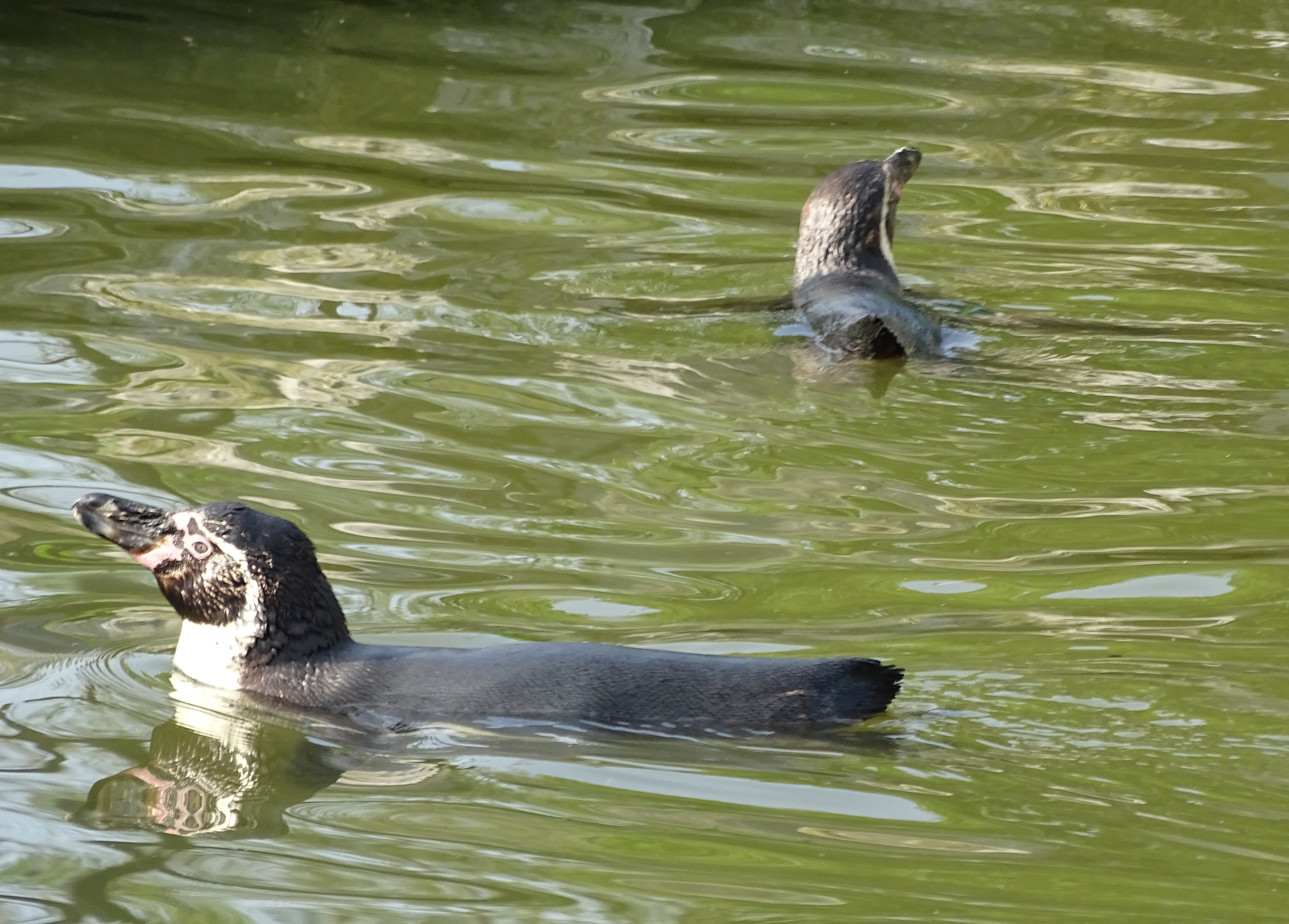
Humboldt penguin

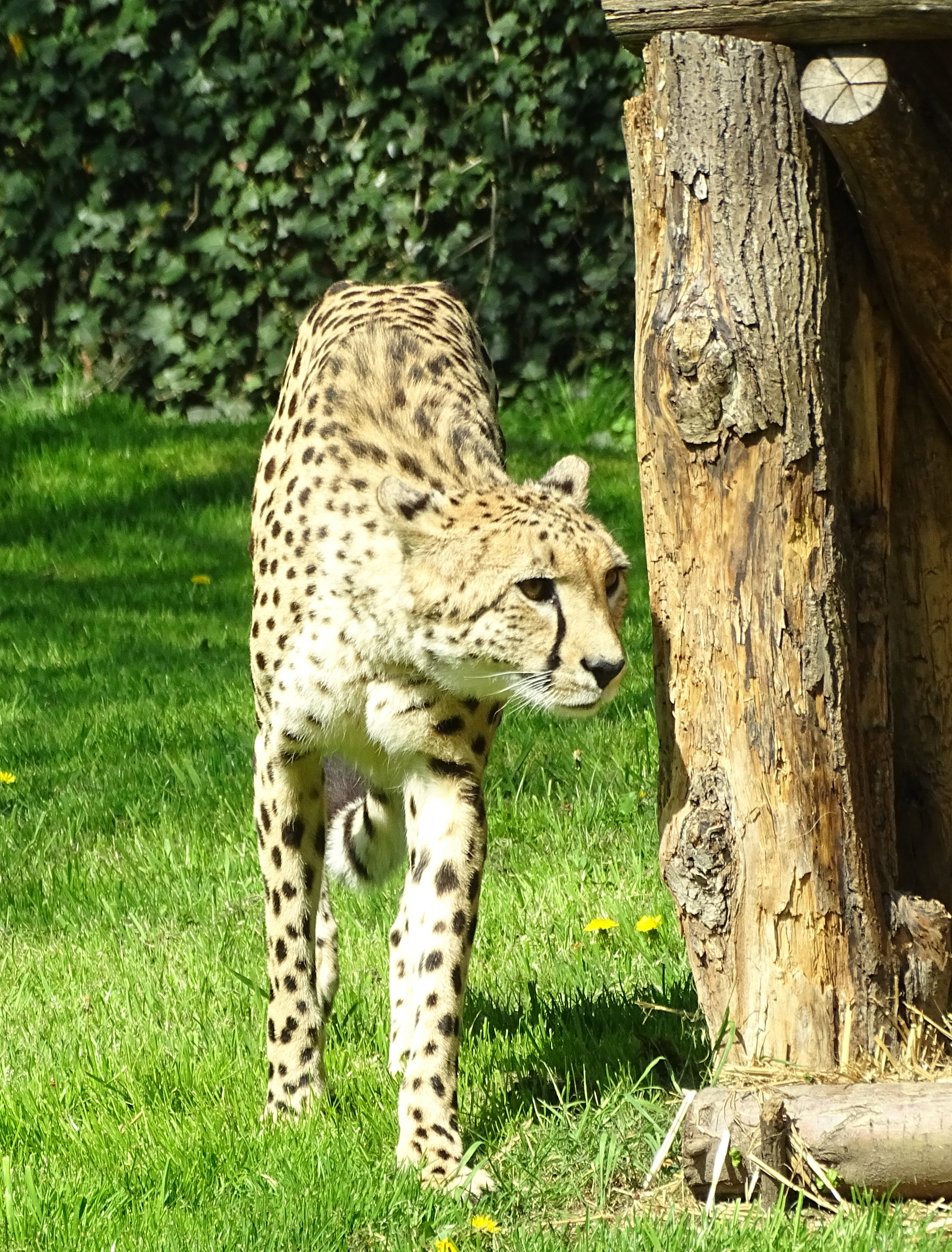
Cheetah

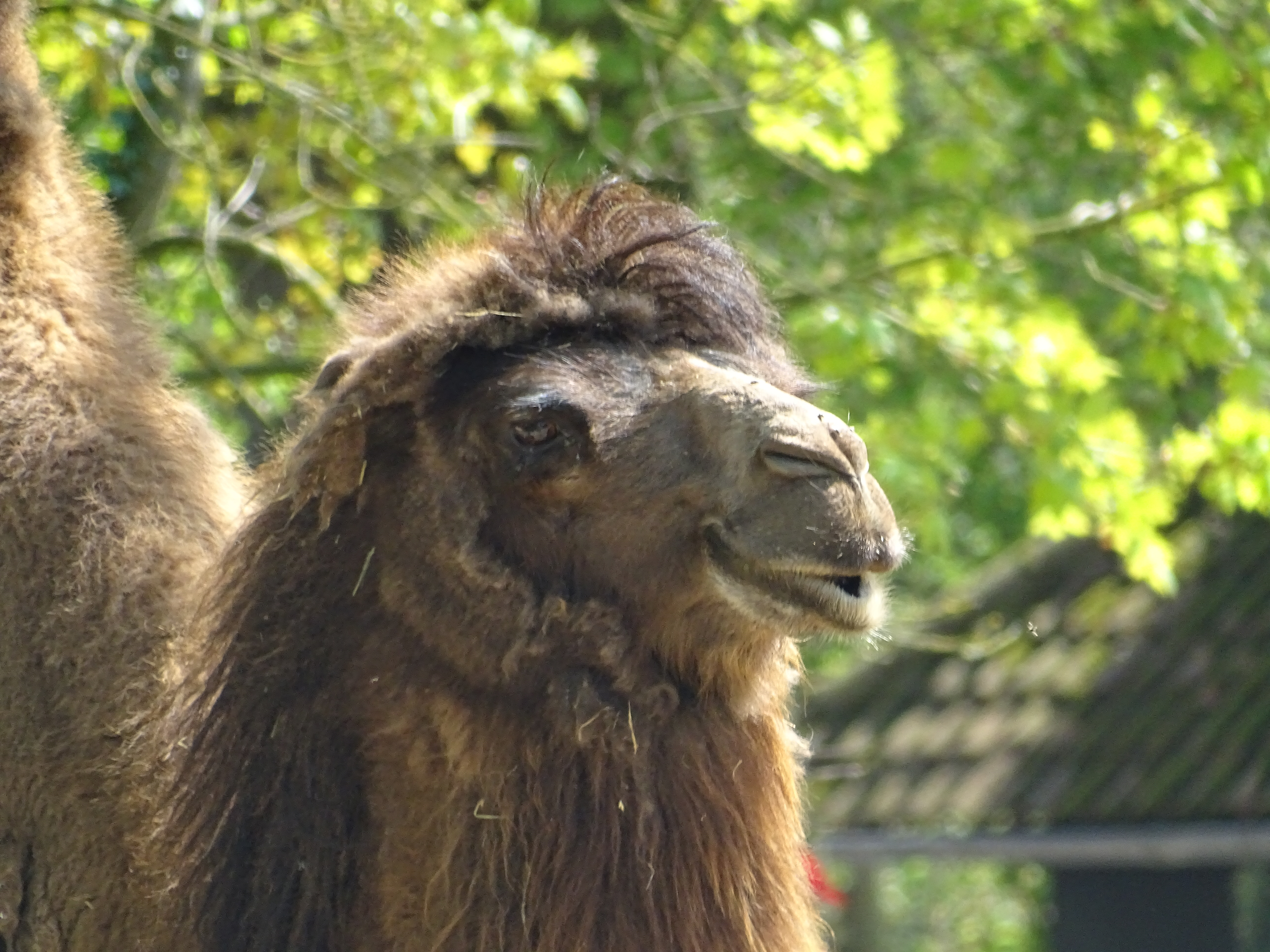
Camel

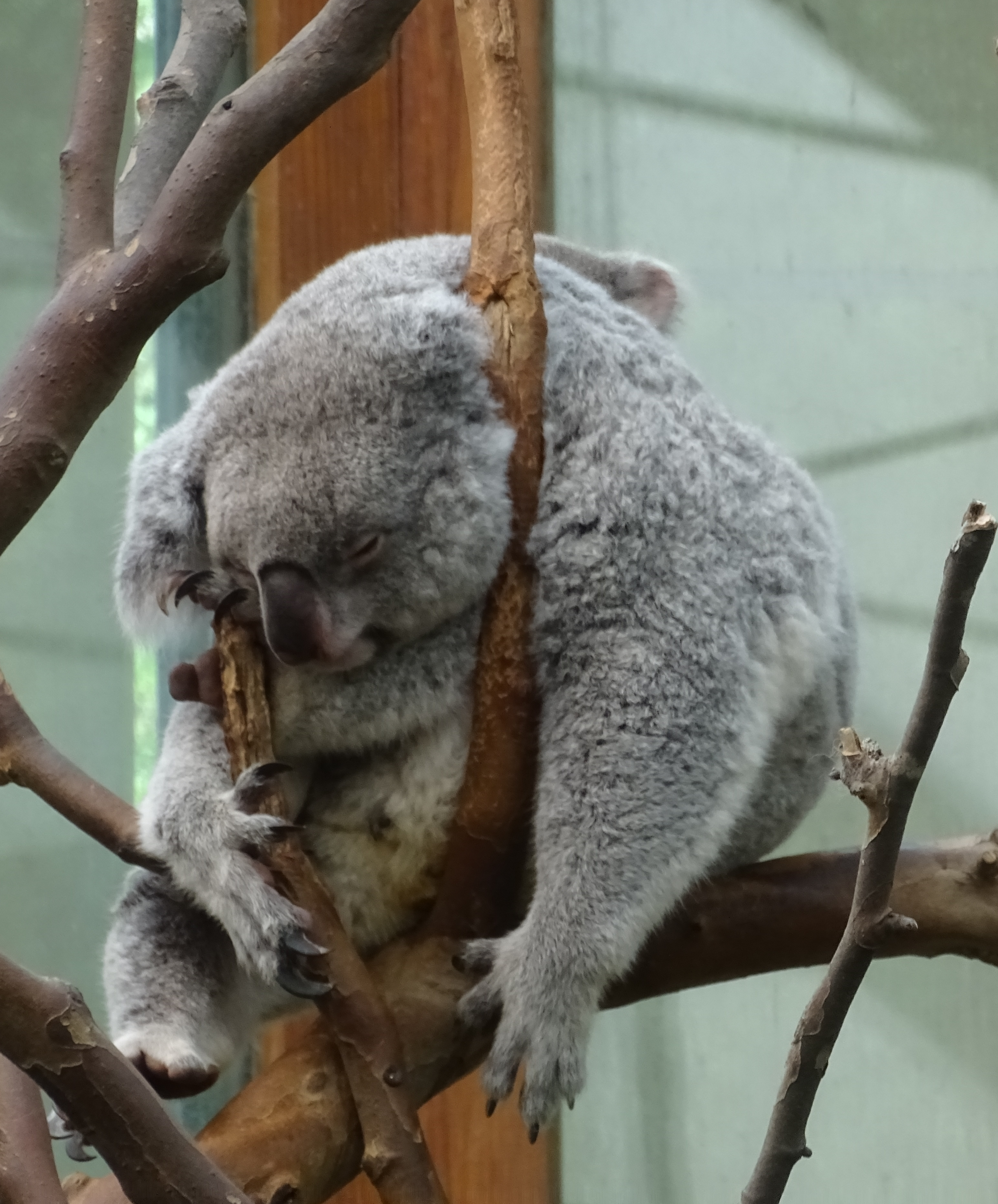
Koala

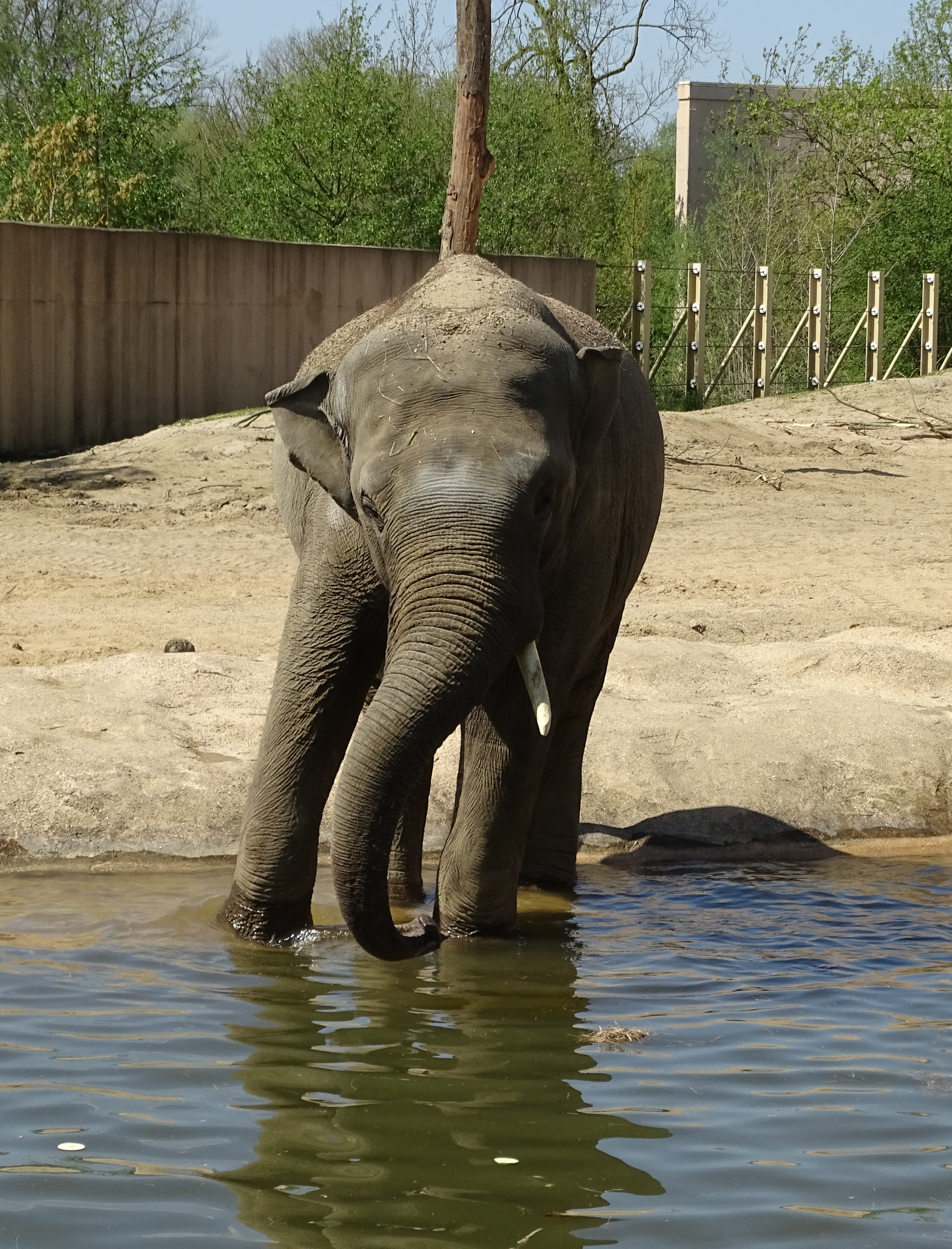
Asian elephant

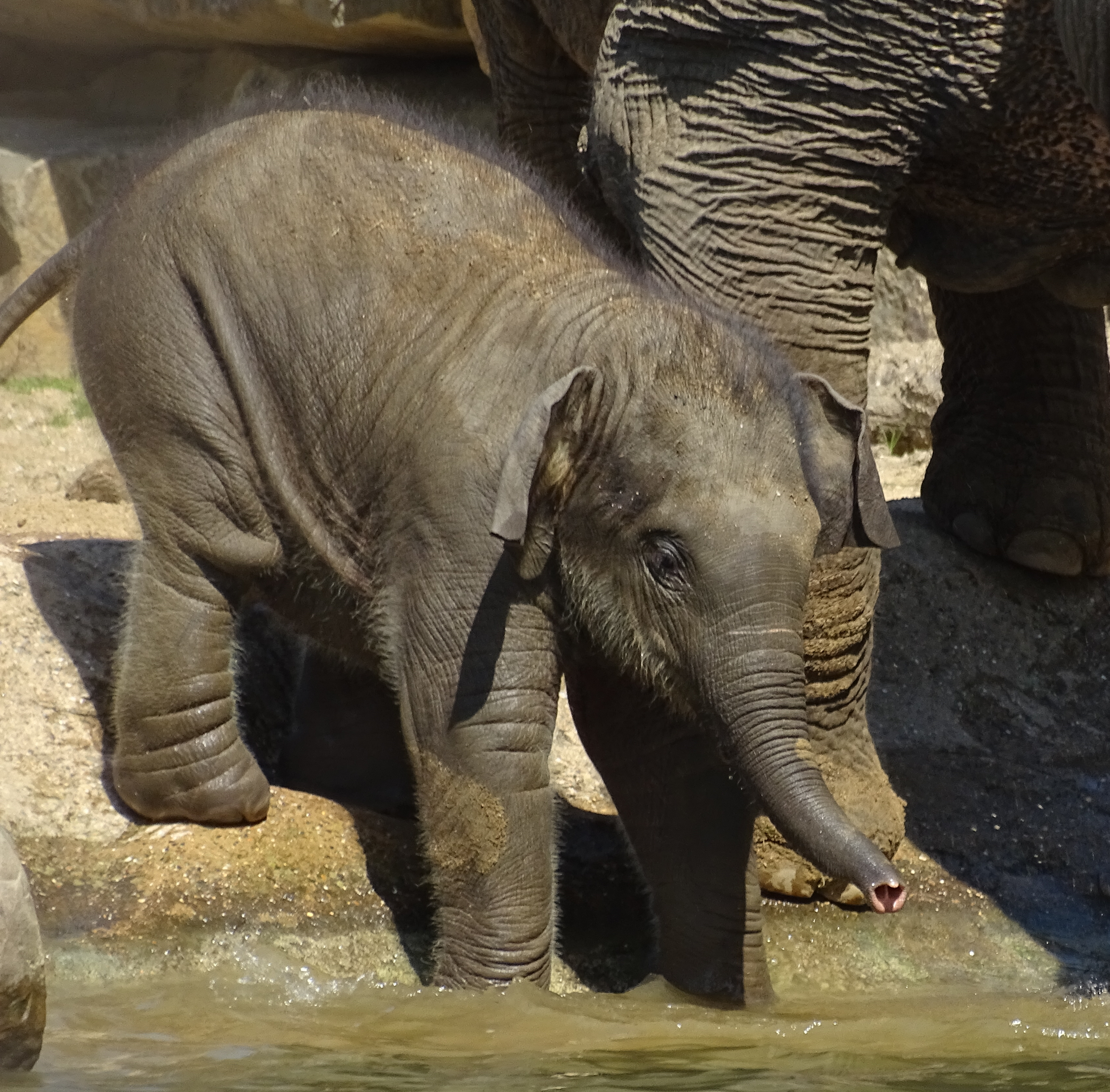
Baby Asian elephant

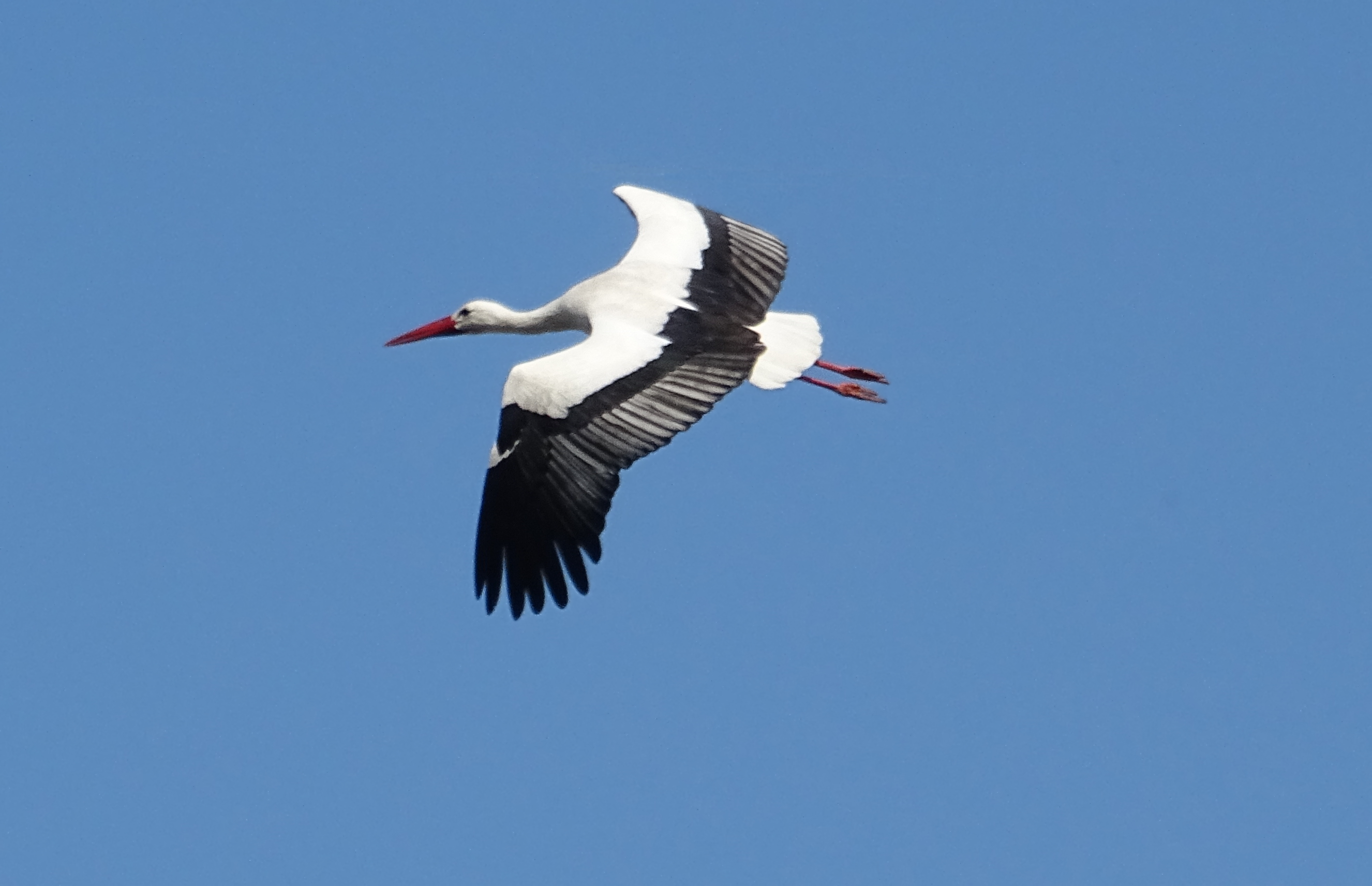
White stork

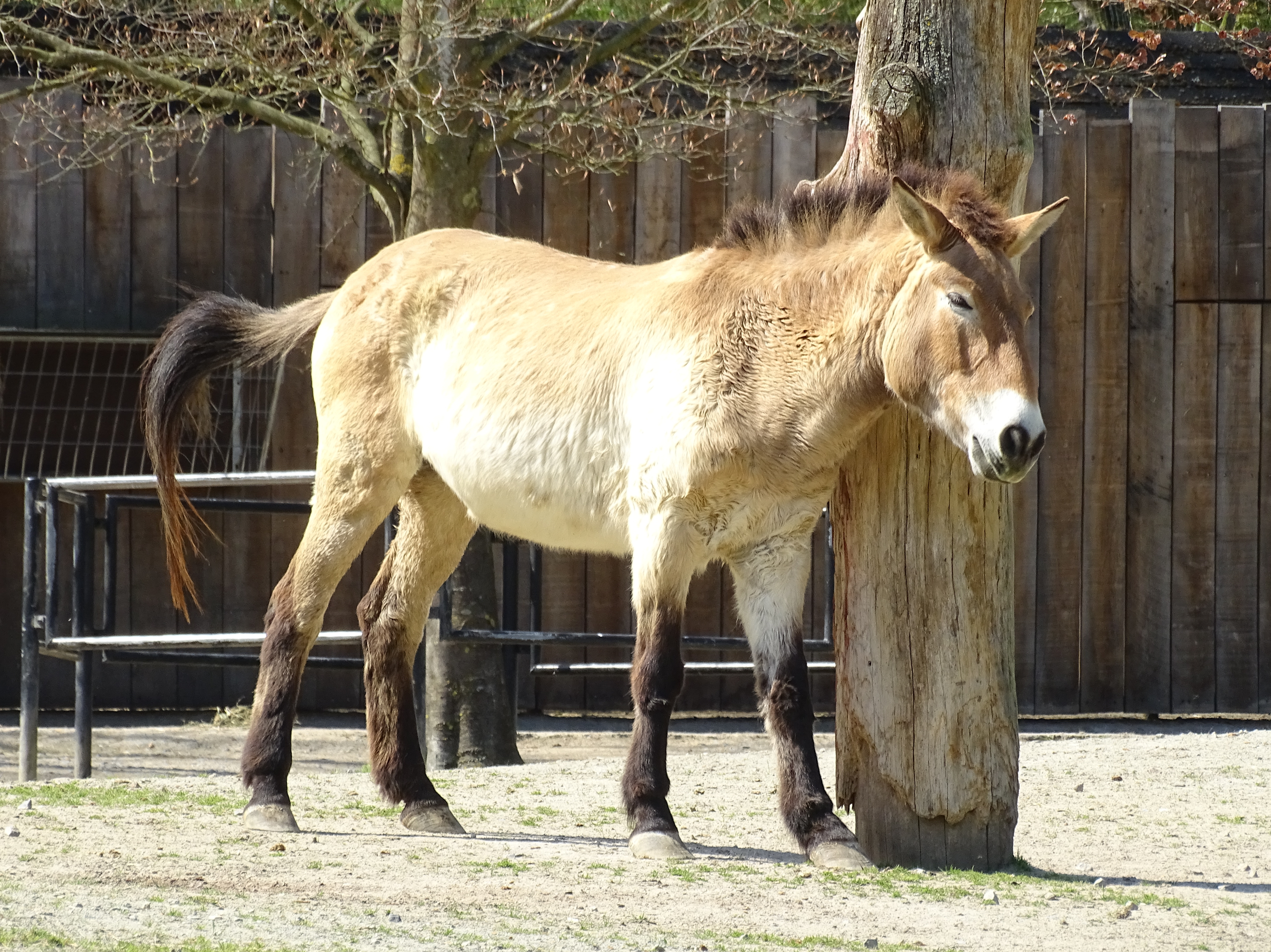
Przewalski's horse
