= Jacques Vekemans =

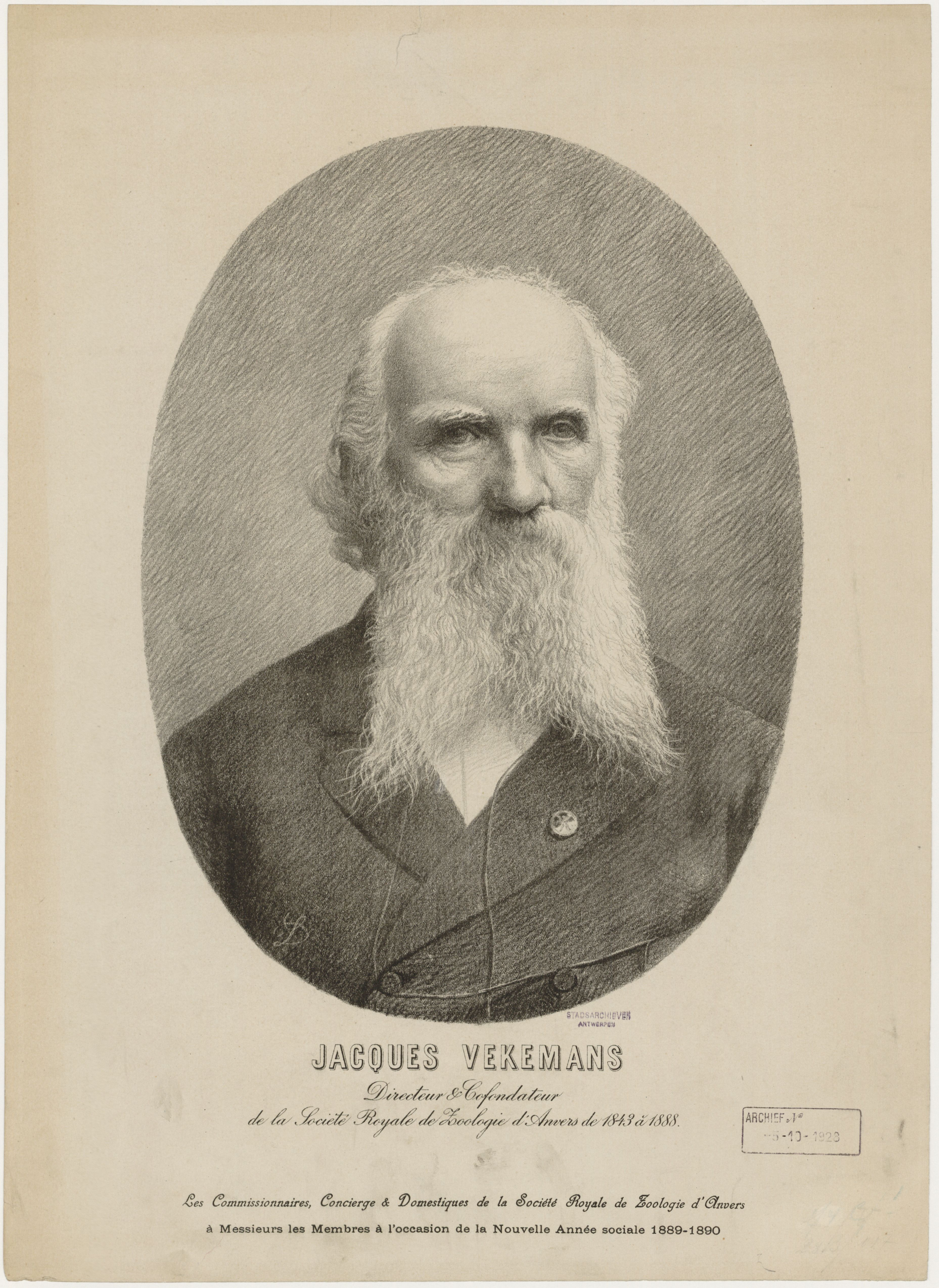

Jacobus "Jacques" Cornelius Vekemans (December 9, 1815 – February 24, 1888) was a Belgian zoologist and zoo manager. He served as the second director of the Antwerp Zoological Garden under his uncle, the director Jacques Kets.

Vekemans was born in Antwerp, son of slate worker Martin-Jean-Corneille and Isabella-Marie Kets. His uncle Jacques Kets taught him about plants and animals and he worked alongside in the natural history department in Antwerp. When the zoological garden was established in Antwerp, his uncle served as directory and he served as a deputy. He made trips across Europe and northern Africa to collect animals for the zoo. He established breeding populations of several exotic animals and birds after becoming the director of the zoo from April 30, 1865. His brother Antoine Vekemans also collected animals for the zoo. He built a sea lion pool, and new housing for the hippos and monkeys. He was able to breed Lady Amherst's pheasant, mandarin duck (1849), black swan (1846), budgerigar (1850) and so on for the first time in Europe. He was able to breed enough to exchange animals with other zoos and established an international animal sale and exchange system in 1854 where zoo directors from around Europe met as well as encouraged the sharing of information on the care of animals.
