= Antwerp Zoo =

Zoo in Antwerp, Belgium

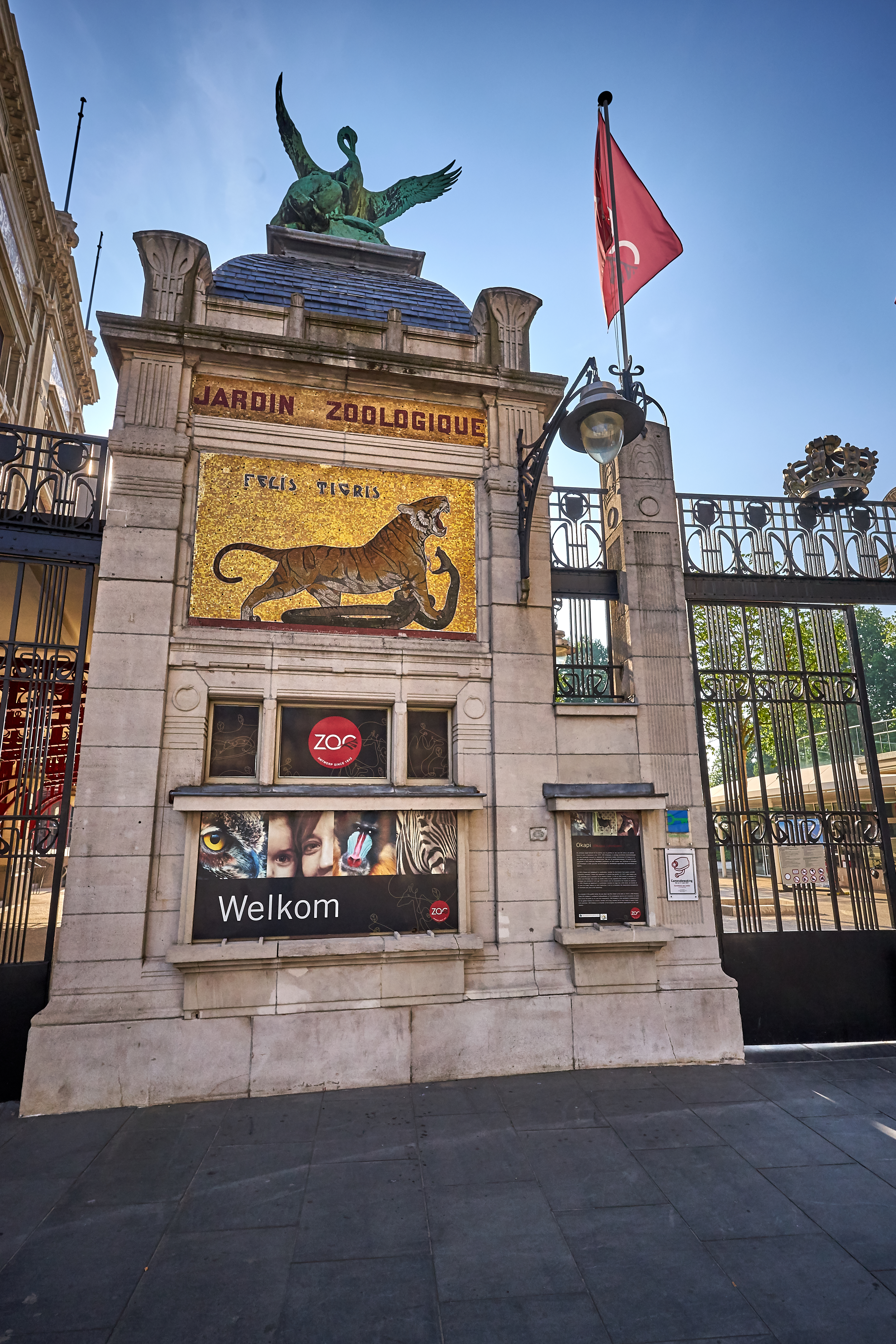
- Entrance gate of the Antwerp Zoo
- Interactive map of Antwerp Zoo
- 51°12′59″N 4°25′24″E
- Date opened: 21 July 1843 (183 years old)
- Location: Antwerp, Belgium
- No. of animals: 5000
- No. of species: 950
- Annual visitors: 1,100,100
- Memberships: 38,000
- Website: http://www.zooantwerpen.be

Antwerp Zoo (Dutch: ZOO Antwerpen) is a zoo in the centre of Antwerp, Belgium, located next to the Antwerpen-Centraal railway station. The zoo is the oldest animal park in Belgium, and one of the oldest in the world; it was established on 21 July 1843.

== History ==
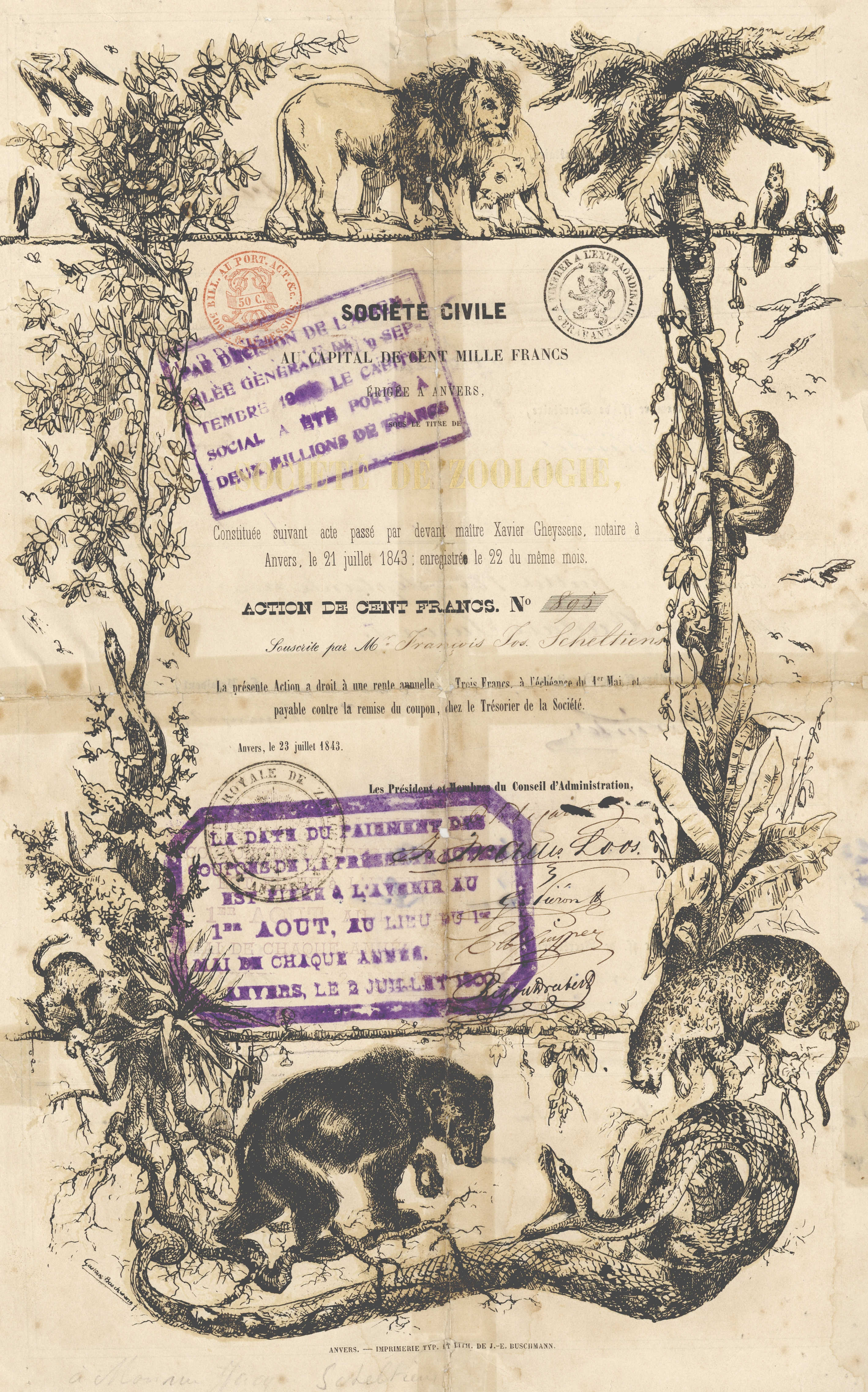
Founder's share of the Antwerp Zoo, issued 23 July 1843

Since its foundation, the park has been controlled by De Koninklijke Maatschappij voor Dierkunde van Antwerpen, a society originally called Société Royale de Zoologie d'Anvers (The Antwerp Royal Society for Zoology). This also became the popular nickname for the zoo, "De Zoologie". The initial objective was to encourage zoological and botanical sciences. Its first director was renowned zoologist and botanist Jacques Kets (10 November 1785 – 1 February 1865). He accepted this position on one condition: a museum had to be built to house his nature-historical collections. This building was inaugurated in 1844 by H.M. King Leopold I. The predicate Royal was added to the name of the society on that occasion. In 1860, Kets' nephew Jacques Vekemans became the director and expanded the zoo, establishing successful breeding programs for several exotic animals.

Throughout the years, it has encouraged wildlife preservation through activities and exhibits on a recreational, educational, scientific, and cultural level.

In its early years, the size of the park grew from less than 1.59 hectares (3.9 acres) to more than 10.5 hectares (26 acres). Notable buildings from that period are the Egyptian temple (1856) and the antelope building (1861) in Oriental style, which now houses the okapis.

The zoo has also a cultural function. Originally, concerts were held in the garden of the zoo. The museum building was demolished to build a concert hall. The hall then became the residence of the Antwerp Symphony Orchestra, the symphonic orchestra of Flanders. The museum collections were moved to the second floor.

For the 1920 Summer Olympics, a specially built stadium at the Zoo's zoology hall hosted the boxing and wrestling events.

After World War II, the animal park was turned into a model zoo which conformed to new and modern scientific, educational, cultural and aesthetic standards. The animal compounds were enlarged and admitted more light. Buildings from this period include the primate building (1958) and the big jubileum complex, established on the occasion of the 125-year anniversary together with the nocturama (1968), which houses the nocturnal animals. The jubileum complex houses birds of prey and the sea lions. In 1973 a new compound for reptilians was built, and in 1978 a new building for smaller species of monkeys. The older primate building was renovated in 1989. To support its educational mission, the zoo started with group tours and special educational programmes called zoo classes in 1969. Around the same time, planetarium exhibits were installed.

On 1 January 1983, the animal park was classified as a monument. Ten years later, its 150th anniversary was celebrated. In 1997, Vriesland (Freezeland) was opened. It houses subantarctic penguins and in the past also Alaskan sea otters. In spring 1999, the elephant compound was expanded. In 2003, many animals, including hippos, Malayan tapirs, and a number of swamp birds received a new home in Hippotopia.

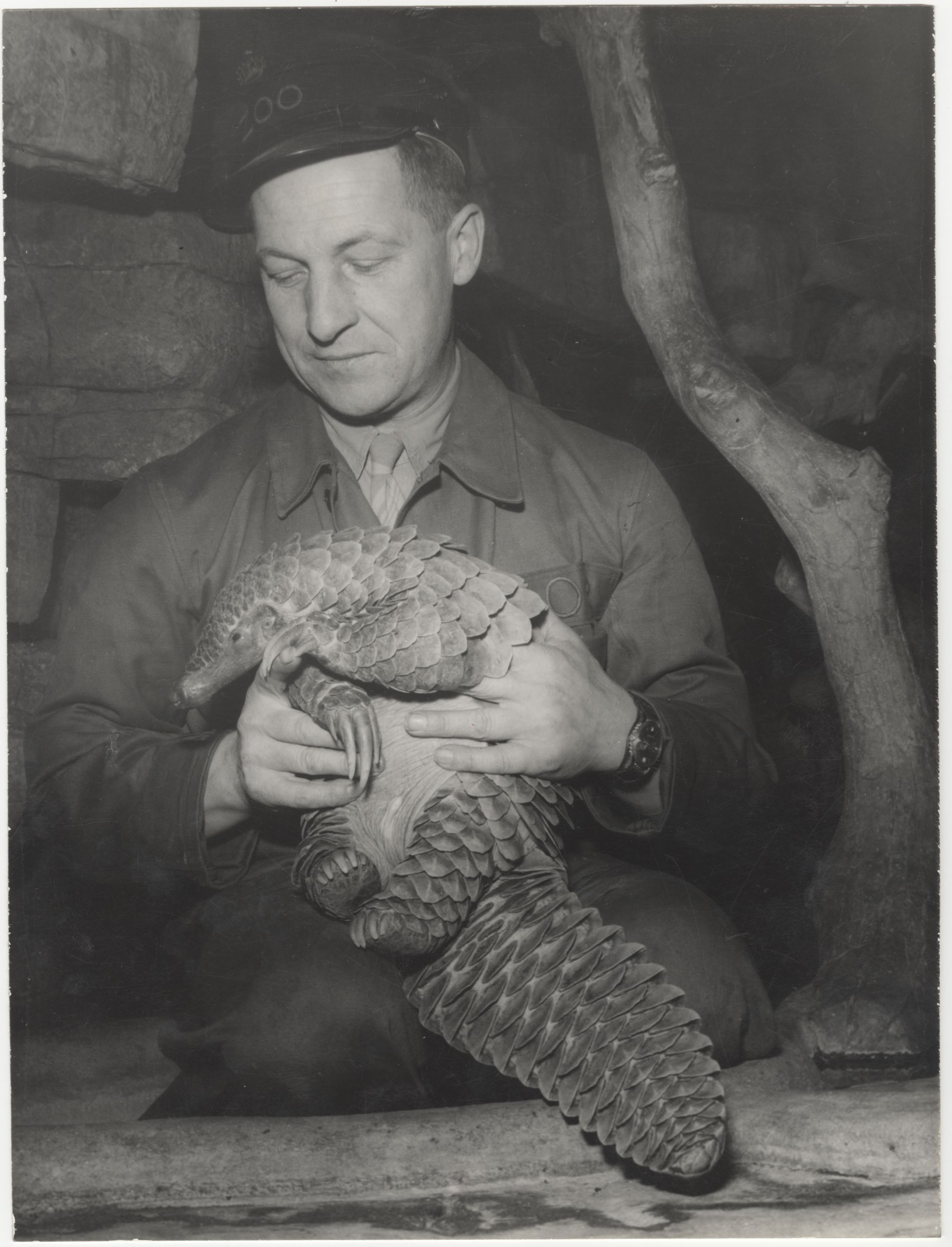
Giant pangolin in Antwerp Zoo, 1940, Touring Club Italiano

== Animals and exhibits ==
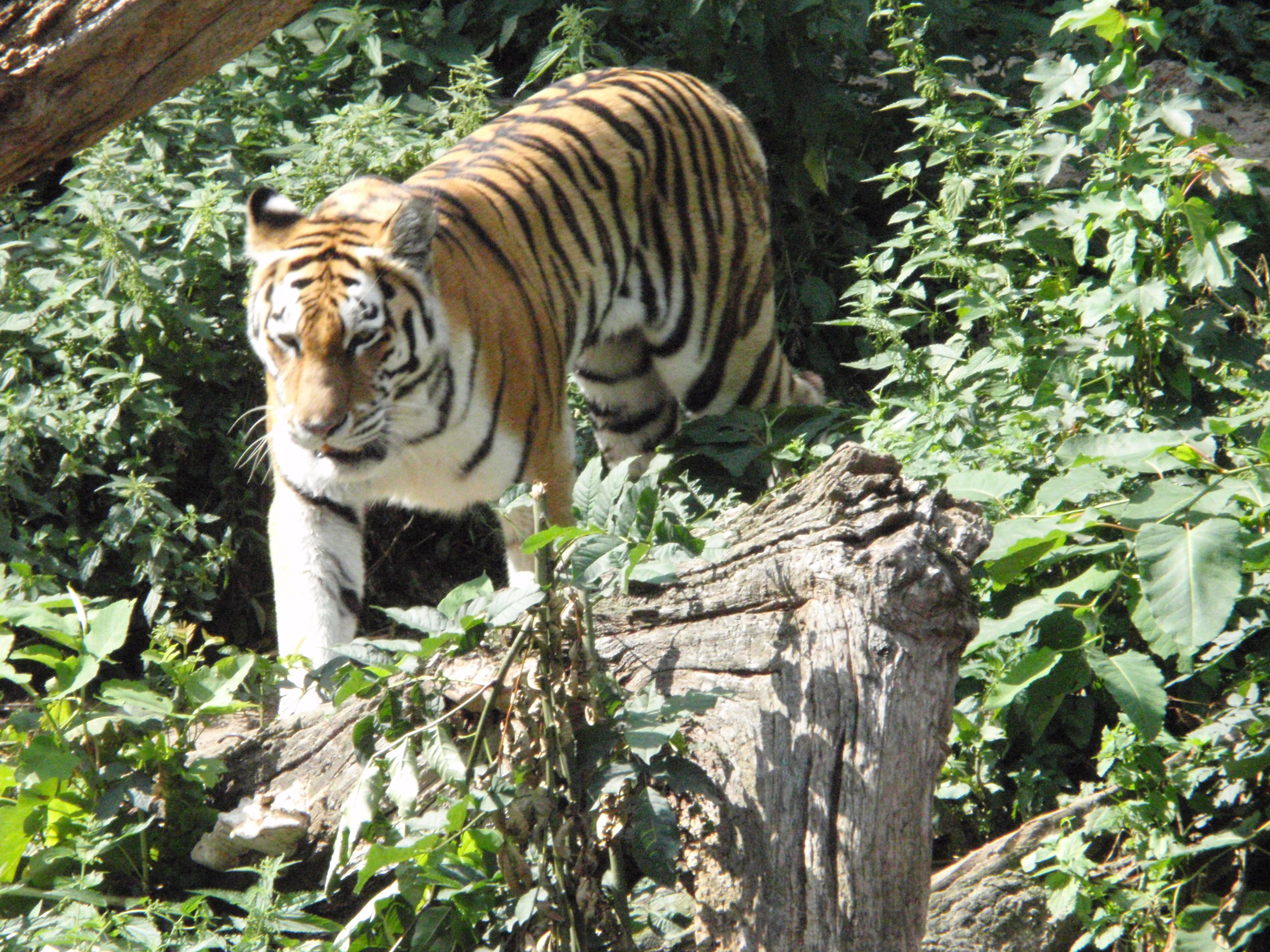
Siberian tiger at Antwerp Zoo

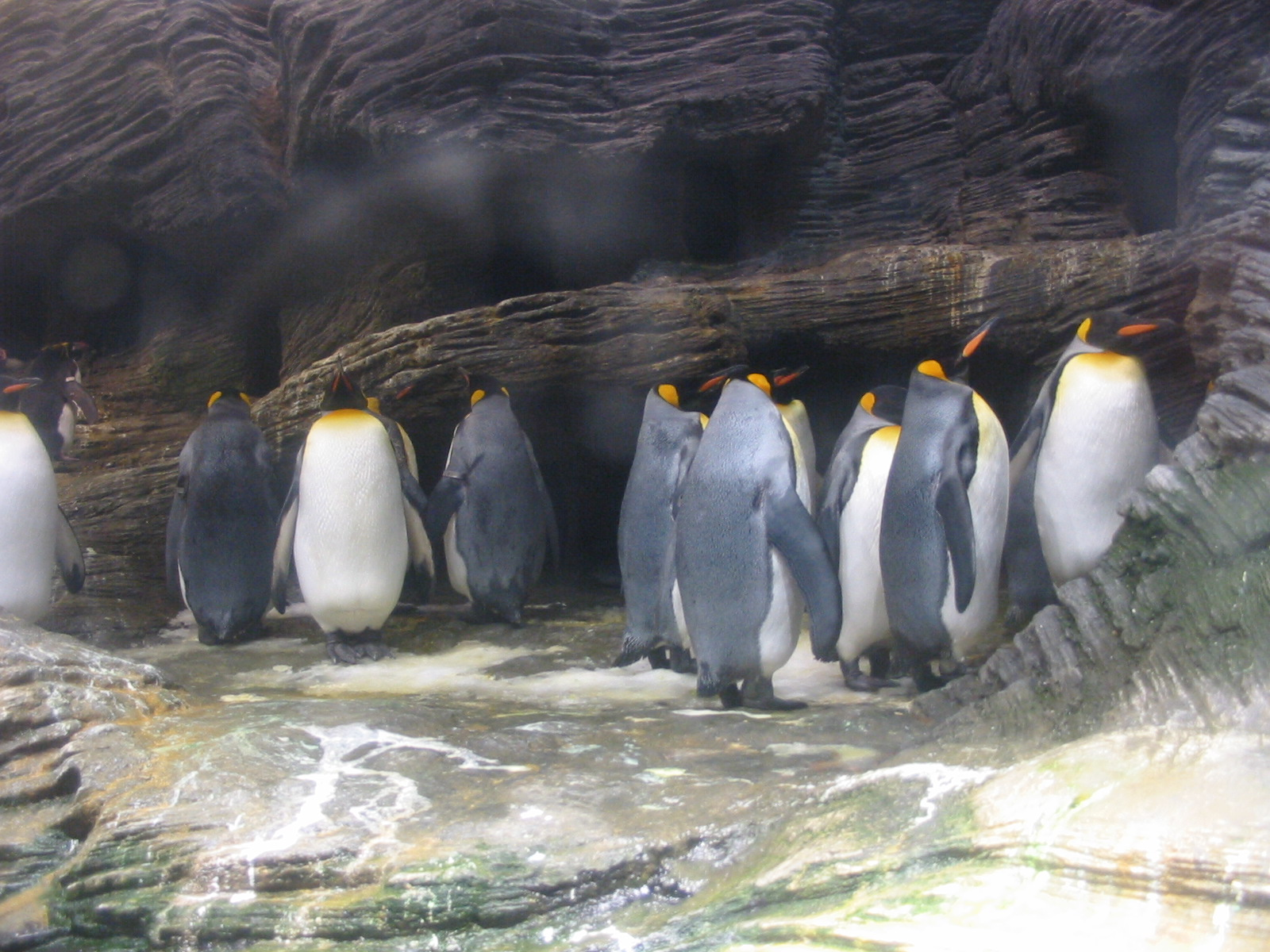
The king penguins are housed in a refrigerated compartment.

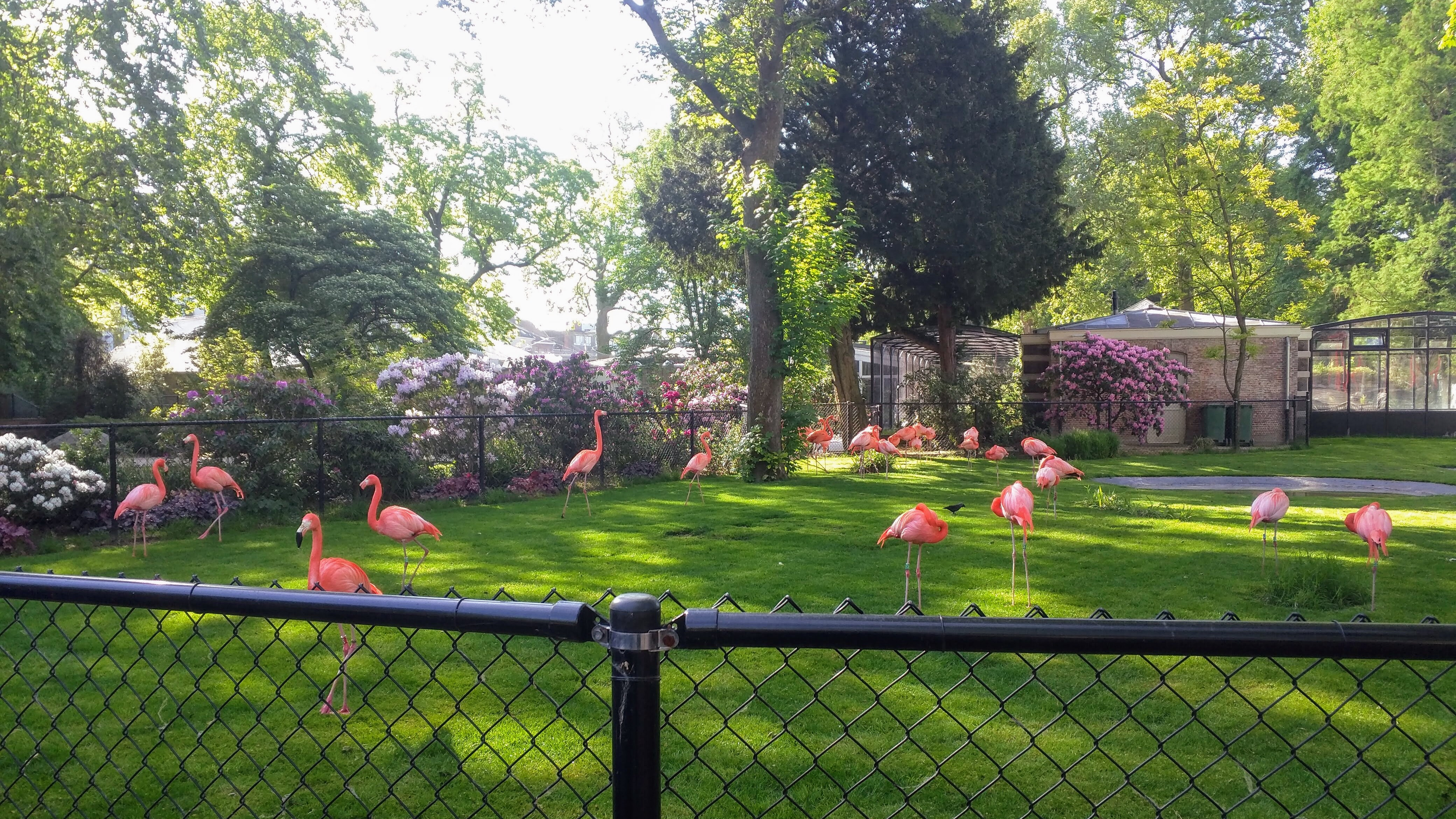
Flamingo enclosure in the Antwerp zoo

Together with its sister park Planckendael, Antwerp Zoo houses over 7,000 animals of about 950 species. Over 1.6 million people visit the zoo and Planckendael each year; further, the zoo has around 200,000 supporting members.

Some exhibits and species in the park include:

- Vriesland with king penguins, macaroni penguins, and gentoo penguins. In the past, a couple of sea otters were also housed here; however, they were replaced by seals after the last one died.
- Aquaforum with California sea lions, used to house bottlenose dolphins up until 1999.
- Reptile house, renovated in 2005 with many species of snakes, lizards, turtles, and frogs, as well as caimans.
- The over a century old renovated aquarium, with renovations completed in 2015, housing many species of saltwater and freshwater fish.
- Savannah aviary with African buffalos and several bird species including guineafowl, ibisess and Abdim's storks.
- Egyptian temple with Asian elephants, ostriches and giraffes,
- Aviaries and bird house with many birds species including military macaws, turacos, toucans, peafowls, pheasants and a large collection of songbirds.
- Hippotopia with pygmy hippopotamuses, malayan tapirs, dalmatian pelicans, coypus and a couple of bird species.
- Bearcanyon with spectacled bears, and coatis.
- Cat enclosures with Amur leopards, lions and jaguars.
- Flemish garden.
- Kangaroo house with koalas and a tree-kangaroo.
- Moorish temple with okapis.
- Monkey house with guerezas, owl-faced monkeys, javan lutungs, emperor tamarins, black-headed spider monkeys, golden-headed lion tamarins, pygmy marmosets, mandrills, ring-tailed lemurs and black lemurs.
- Ape house with chimpanzees, western lowland gorillas and the world's only eastern lowland gorilla in captivity outside of Africa.
- Birds of prey including snowy owls, spectacled owls, crested caracaras, Keas and several vultures.
- Other enclosures featuring harbour seals, bongos, meerkats, red pandas, North American porcupines, American flamingos and African penguins.

The zoo used to have a dolphinarium called the Aquaforum. At the time of its construction, it was one of the most modern of its kind. Over the years, however, the infrastructure was considered far too small and dated. The zoo's urban location prevented any expansion and meant the society could not build a new one. In 1999, the two dolphins were relocated to Duisburg Zoo in Germany because of the new national standards for exhibits, with the exhibit too shallow to keep housing dolphins. The Aquaforum is now home to sea lions, which are much less demanding.

== Architecture and garden ==
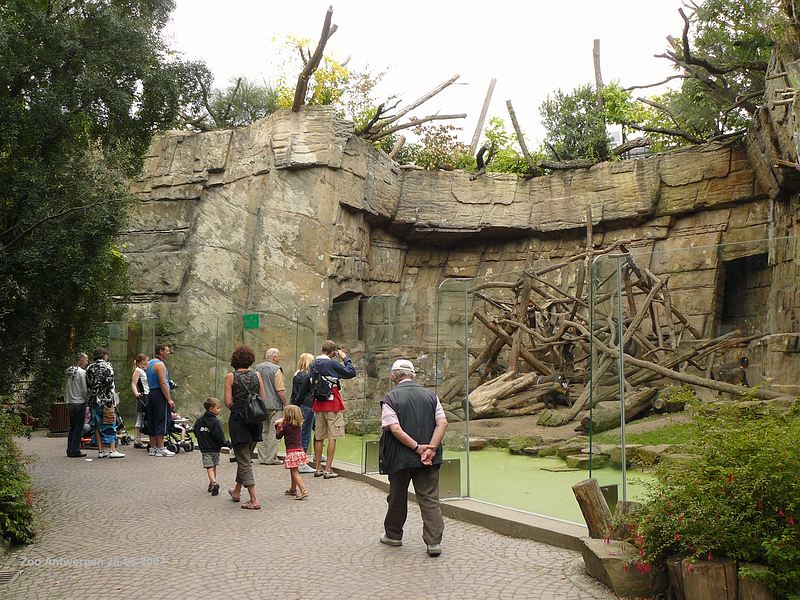
Enclosure for mandrils

Antwerp Zoo is one of the oldest zoos in the world, having been established in 1843. Many buildings are very well preserved. Some of them have received new functions throughout the years.

- Entrance of the zoo (1843)
- Egyptian temple (1856)
- Moor temple (1885): it still houses okapis. Antwerp Zoo became the world's first zoo with okapis in 1918.
- Bird building (1948)
- Nocturama (1968)
- Reptile building (1901): this building looks like a Greek temple.
- Aquarium (1910): designed by Emile Thielens.
- Winter garden (1897): a tropical greenhouse.

On 1 January 1983 the entire park (architecture and garden) was listed as a monument.

== Breeding programmes ==
Antwerp Zoo has played its role in preservation and breeding programmes for several endangered species, including the okapi, the Przewalski horse, the Congo peafowl, the bonobo, the golden-headed lion tamarin, the European otter, and the Knysna seahorse. They take part in the European Endangered Species Programme.

== Centre for Research and Conservation ==
The Centre for Research and Conservation (CRC) is an important research department of the Royal Zoological Society of Antwerp. The CRC is not a separate research institute, but is very much embedded in the structure and functioning of the society. Research takes place at Antwerp Zoo, at the Wild Animal Park Planckendael, in other zoos and associated institutions, in situ in Cameroon with the Projet Grands Singes, in Brazil with BioBrasil, and in the RZSA's own wetland nature reserve "De Zegge" in Belgium. For all research fields, the CRC combines strictly zoo-related research and fundamental research, and reports to scientists in peer reviewed journals as well as to the general public. The conservation of wildlife and their natural habitat is very important for the CRC. The centre also receives money from the Flemish Government. In 2006 the Centre for Research and Conservation of Antwerp Zoo has won the EAZA Research Award.

== Affiliated parks and domains ==
- In 1952, the society in control of the zoo bought the nature preserve De Zegge in Geel, because nature preservation is an important part of its mission statement. It is an area that spans 96 hectares (240 acres) and receives international wildlife protection.
- In 1956, the same society bought the Domein Planckendael in Muizen, near Mechelen. It covers an area of 40 hectares (99 acres) and has become a full-grown animal park.
