= Wexy =

Historical animal

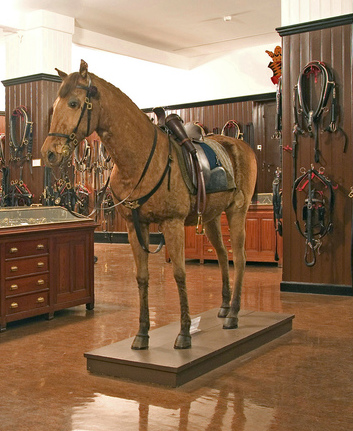
Mounted Wexy at the Dutch Royal Stables in The Hague

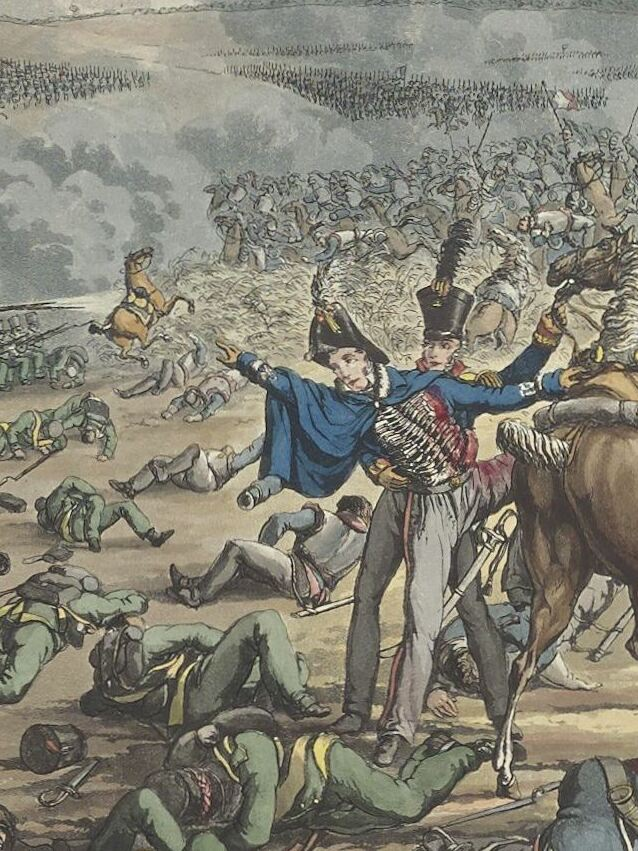
Image of the Battle of Waterloo with the Prince in the front and Wexy in the background

Wexy, also called Vexy or Wexi (ca. 1801 – 1839/1840) was a horse owned by William II of the Netherlands when he was the Prince of Orange. The Irish half-breed animal played a role in the battle of Waterloo on June 18, 1815, where he was wounded in the left hind leg. Wexy died in 1839 with reports of living up to 38 years and 7 months old. He was mounted during an exhibition in Antwerp by Jacques Kets.

Around 1844, Wexy appeared in the paintings of the Gothic Hall at Kneuterdijk Palace. From around 1900, he has been in the harness room of the Dutch Royal Stables. Wexy is a rare example of a stuffed horse preserved for so long.

Kets probably removed a stomach stone from the Wexy's carcass during preparation, which ended up at the municipal pharmacy in The Hague. When the pharmacy was demolished in the 1920s, a passer-by found the stone on the street, and then to the United States under Johnny Fox (1953–2017). In 2018, the stone was acquired by the Royal Collections of the Netherlands.

== See also ==
- List of historical horses
